= Ukrainian avant-garde =

Avant-garde movements in 20th-century Ukraine

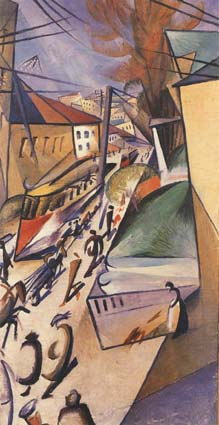
Tram, Alexander Bogomazov, 1914

Ukrainian avant-garde is the avant-garde movement in Ukrainian art from the end of 1890s to the middle of the 1930s along with associated artists in sculpture, painting, literature, cinema, theater, stage design, graphics, music, and architecture. Some well-known Ukrainian avant-garde artists include: Kazimir Malevich, Alexander Archipenko, Vladimir Tatlin, Sonia Delaunay, Vasyl Yermylov, Alexander Bogomazov, Aleksandra Ekster, David Burliuk, Vadym Meller, and Anatol Petrytsky. All were closely connected to the Ukrainian cities of Kyiv, Kharkiv, Lviv, and Odesa by either birth, education, language, national traditions or identity. Since it originated when Ukraine was part of the Russian Empire, Ukrainian avant-garde has been commonly lumped by critics into the Russian avant-garde movement.

The first formal Ukrainian artistic group to call itself "Avangarde" (Avant-garde) was founded in Kharkiv in 1925. The term, "Ukrainian Avant-Garde", concerning painting and sculpture during Soviet censorship, was used during discussion at Tatlin's dream exhibition. Curated by Parisian art historian Andréi Nakov, in London, 1973, the exhibition showcased works of Ukrainian artists Vasyl Yermylov and Alexander Bogomazov. The first international avant-garde exhibitions in Ukraine, which included French, Italian, Ukrainian and Russian artists, were presented in Odesa and Kyiv at the Izdebsky Salon; the pieces were later exhibited in St. Petersburg and Riga. The cover of "Izdebsky Salon 2" (1910–11) contained abstract work by Wassily Kandinsky.

== Timeline ==
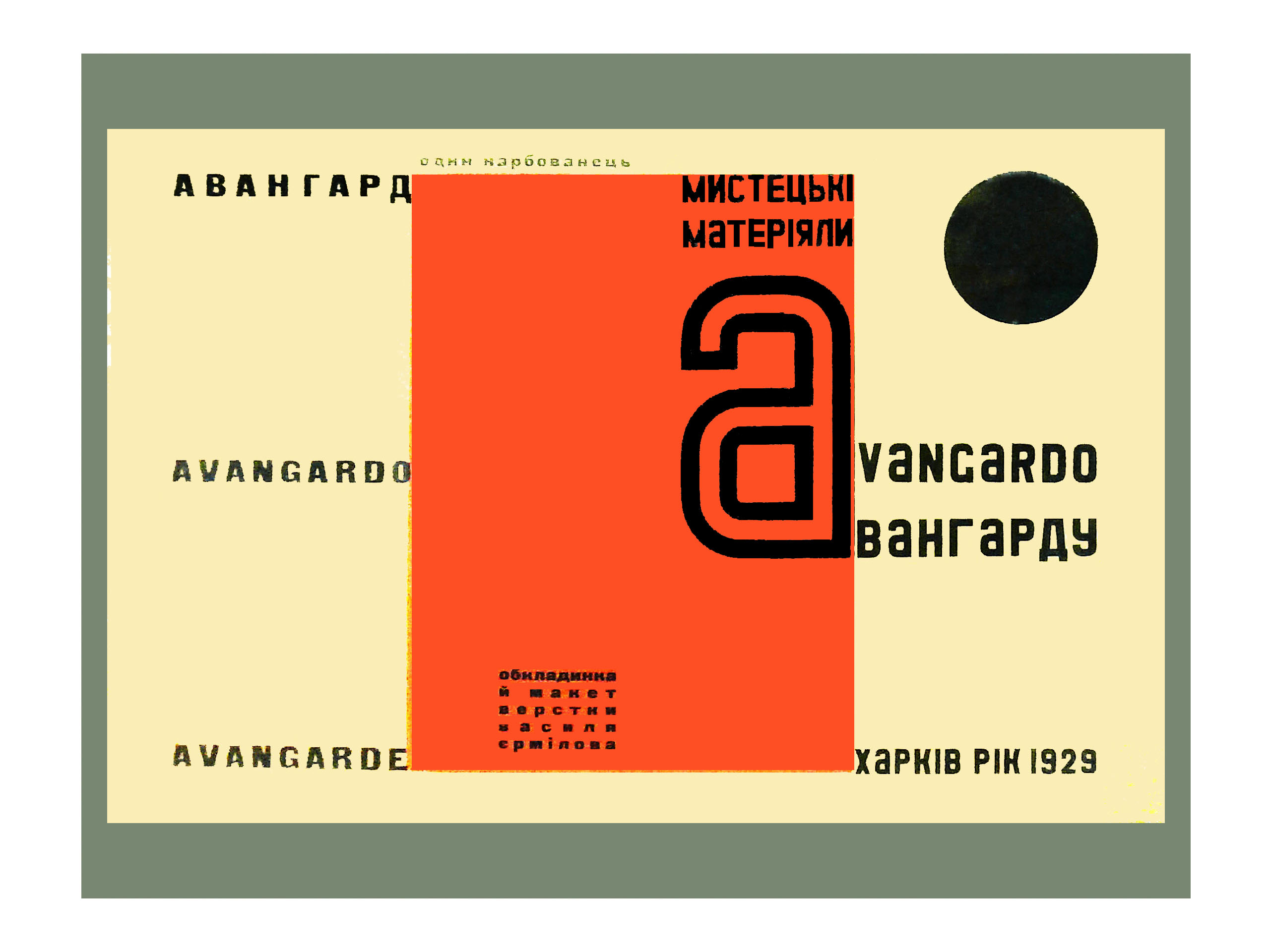
Vasyl Yermylov cover of "Avangarde" magazine, 1929

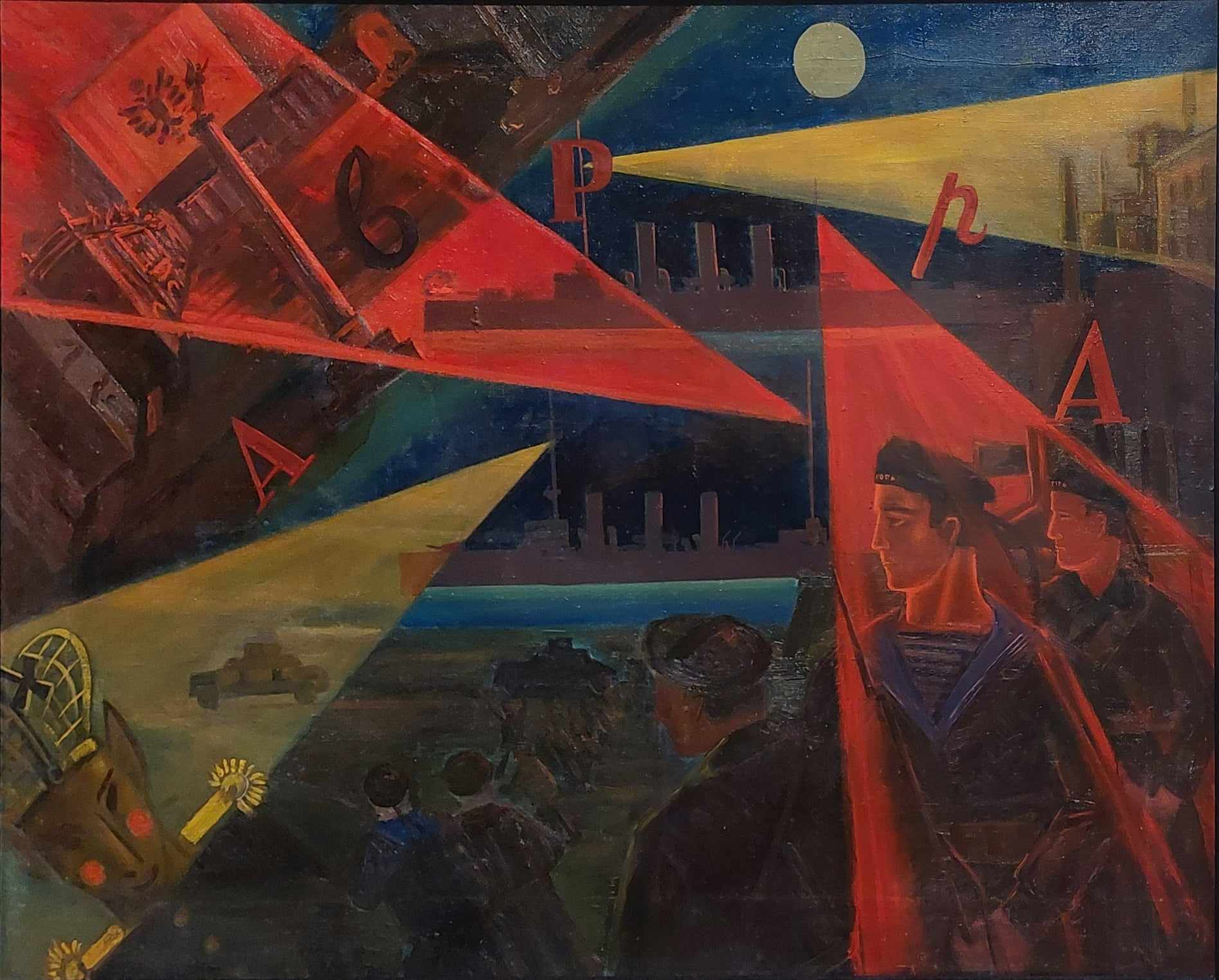
Ukrainian avant-garde painting The Overthrow of the Autocracy

- 1908: Exhibition "Zveno" in Kyiv; works by Alexandra Exter, David Burliuk, Vladimir Burliuk, Yevgeny Agafonov, and Volodymyr Denisov.
- 1909: "Blue Lily" at Kharkiv; works by Eugene Agafonov, Maria Sinyakova, and Vasyl Yermilov.
- 1910: Exhibition "Salon Izdebsky 2" at Odesa and Kyiv; works by Alexandra Exter, David and Vladimir Burliuk, and Wassily Kandinsky, alongside pieces by Pierre Bonnard, Georges Braque, Maurice de Vlaminck, Maurice Denis, Henri Matisse, Henri Rousseau, and Paul Signac.
- 1910: "Hylaea", a Ukrainian-Russian association of Futurist poets, is founded in Chornianka, Kahovsky region, South of Ukraine. Members include David and Vladimir Burliuk, V. Kamensky, Aleksei Kruchyonykh, Benedikt Livshits, Vladimir Mayakovsky, Velimir Khlebnikov, and others.
- 1913: Mykhaylo Semenko in Kyiv founds the Ukrainian futurist group "Quero".
- 1914: Aleksandra Ekster – together with her fellow-Ukrainians Archipenko, Vladimir Baranov-Rossiné, Kazimir Malevich, Vadym Meller and the Burliuk brothers, exhibit at the Société des Artistes Indépendants in Paris and, alongside Archipenko, take part in the Esposizione Libera Futurista Internazionale in Rome.
- 1914: Aleksandra Ekster and Alexander Bogomazov found the group of Cubo-Futurists artists named "Koltso" in Kyiv.
- 1917: Artistic group "Union of Seven" is founded in Kharkiv; members included Boris Kosarev, Georgy Tsapok, Volodymyr Bobrytsky, and Nikolai Kalmykov.
- 1924: Kyiv Art Institute (KHI); professors included Alexander Bogomazov, Vadym Meller, Victor Palmov, Kazimir Malevich, and Vladimir Tatlin.
- 1925: Artistic association and magazine "Avangarde" at Kharkiv, founded by Valerian Polishchuk and Vasyl Yermilov.
- 1925: Association of Revolutionary Art of Ukraine (ARMU) founded in Kyiv; members include Mykhailo Boychuk, Alexander Bogomazov, Victor Palmov, Vasyl Yermilov and Vadym Meller.
- 1927: The Union of Modern Artists of Ukraine (OSMU) is founded in Kyiv; Victor Palmov, Anatol Petrytsky, and Pavel Golubyitnikov are involved.
- 1927: Artistic association and the magazine "New Generation" is founded in Kharkiv by M. Semenko, Nina Genke-Meller, Vadym Meller, Anatol Petrytsky, and Geo Shkarupii.

== People involved ==
=== Cinema ===
- Alexander Dovzhenko

=== Painters ===
- Yevgeny Agafonov
- Alexander Bogomazov
- Aleksandra Ekster
- Mykhailo Boychuk
- Vladimir Burliuk
- David Burliuk
- Mykola Hlushchenko
- Sonia Delaunay
- Oleksandr Hnylytskyi
- Kazimir Malevich
- Abraham A. Manievich
- Vadym Meller
- Victor Palmov
- Oksana Pavlenko
- Kostiantyn Piskorskyi
- Vasily Sedlyar
- Manuil Shechtman
- Maria Sinyakova
- Vladimir Tatlin
- Vasyl Yermylov
- Nina Genke-Meller

=== Sculptors ===
- Alexander Archipenko
- Ivan Kavaleridze
- Petro Mitkovicer

=== Theatre directors ===
- Boris Balaban
- Les Kurbas
- Faust Lopatynsky
- Volodymyr Sklyarenko
- Mark Tereshchenko
- Januariy Bortnik

=== Stage Designers ===
- Aleksandra Ekster
- Vadym Meller
- Anatol Petrytsky
- Alexander Khvostenko-Khvostov
- Mykhailo Andriienko-Nechytailo

=== Writers ===
- Mykola Bazhan
- Myroslav Irchan
- Mykola Khvylovy
- Valerian Polishchuk
- Mykhaylo Semenko
- Geo Shkurupiy
- Oleksa Slisarenko
- Maik Yohansen
- Mykhailo Yaloviy
- Yuriy Yanovsky

=== Architects ===
- Pavlo Alyoshin
- Mark Felger
- Joseph Karakis
- Samuil Kravets
- Vasyl Krychevsky
- Valerian Rykov
- Sergei Serafimov

=== Composers ===
- Borys Lyatoshynsky
- Zinoviy Lysko
- Stefania Turkewich
