= National Art Museum of Ukraine =

Art museum in Kyiv, Ukraine

The National Art Museum of Ukraine
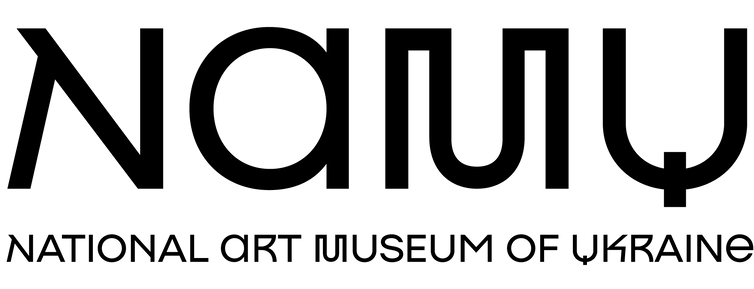

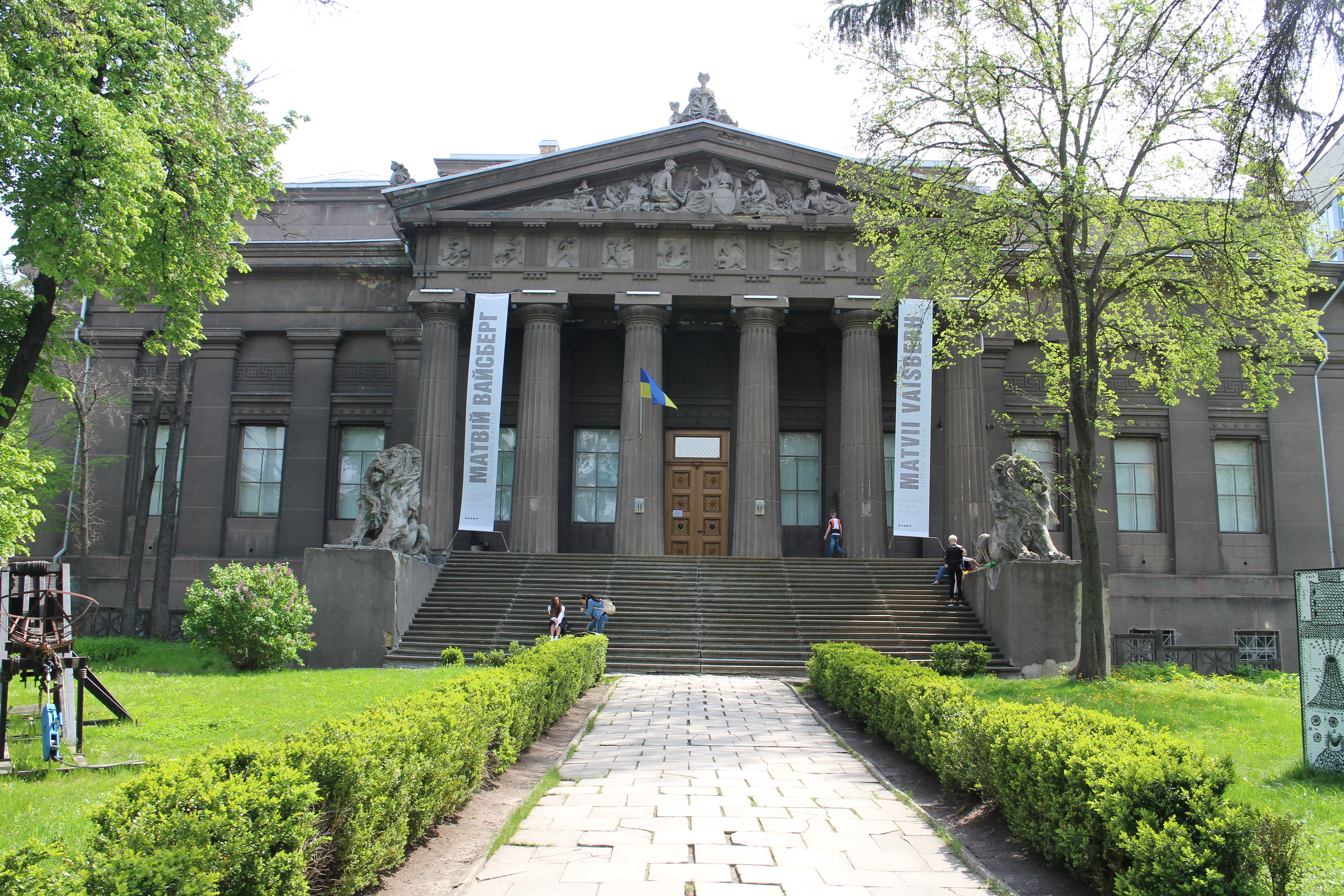
- Established: 1899
- Location: 6 Hrushevsky Street, Kyiv, Ukraine
- Coordinates: 50°26′58″N 30°31′52″E
- Director: Yulia Lytvynets
- Website: namu.ua

Immovable Monument of National Significance of Ukraine
- Official name: Будинок музею древностей і мистецтв – Національний художній музей України ("Building of the museum of antiquities and arts – National Art Museum of Ukraine")
- Type: Architecture, History, Monumental Art
- Reference no.: 260084

The National Art Museum of Ukraine (Ukrainian: Національний художній музей України [nɐts⁽ʲ⁾ioˈnɑlʲnɪj xʊˈdɔʒn⁽ʲ⁾ij mʊˈzɛj ʊkrɐˈjinɪ], romanized: Natsionalnyi khudozhnii muzei Ukrainy, stylized NAMU) is a museum dedicated to Ukrainian art in Kyiv, Ukraine.

== History ==
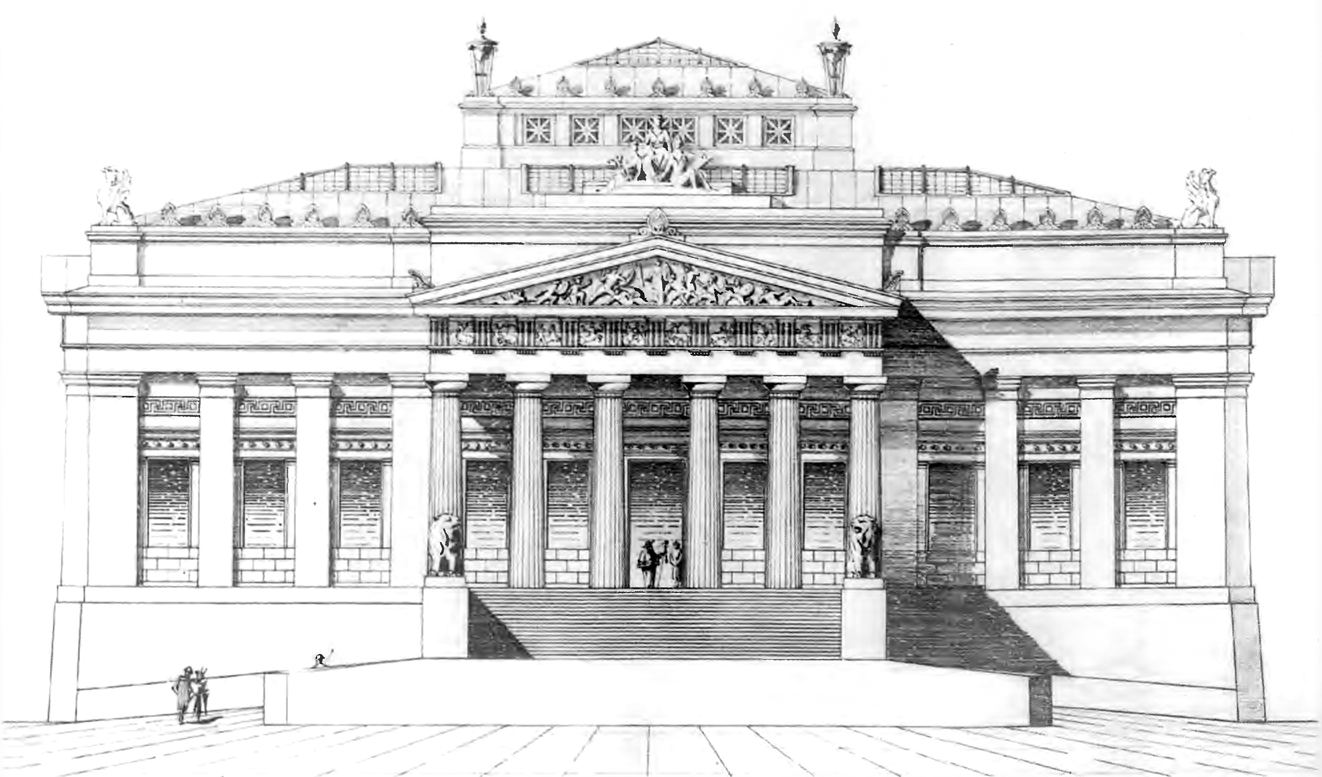
The main facade, presented by the Museum of Antiquities and Arts, 1898

The National Art Museum of Ukraine, the first museum in Kyiv to be freely open to the public, was founded at the end of the 19th century at the initiative of Ukrainian intellectuals.

The museum building was designed by the Moscow architect Petro Boitsov in neo-classic style. The plans were updated by Polish architect Władysław Horodecki.

The ХІ All-Russian Archaeology Conference took place in the uncompleted building in August 1899. The official opening and consecration of the Kyiv Art-Industrial and Scientific Museum of Emperor Nikolai Alexandrovich was held on December 30, 1904.

In 1919, the museum was called the First State, from 1924, the Taras Shevchenko All-Ukrainian Historical Museum, from 1936, the State Ukrainian Museum and from 1939, The State Museum of Ukrainian Art.

During the Germany occupation of Kyiv in 1942, the museum was integrated with the Russian art collection as the State Museum of East European Art. In 1944, the previous museum status was renewed. These name changes reflected the complicated history of the country and move of certain collections to other Kyiv museums.

Following Ukrainian independence in 1991, the institution was renamed the National Art Museum of Ukraine in 1994.

During the Russo-Ukrainian war, the museum lost all its windows and sustained critical damage to its skylights and plaster walls following a Russian air attack on May 24, 2026.

== Main building architecture ==
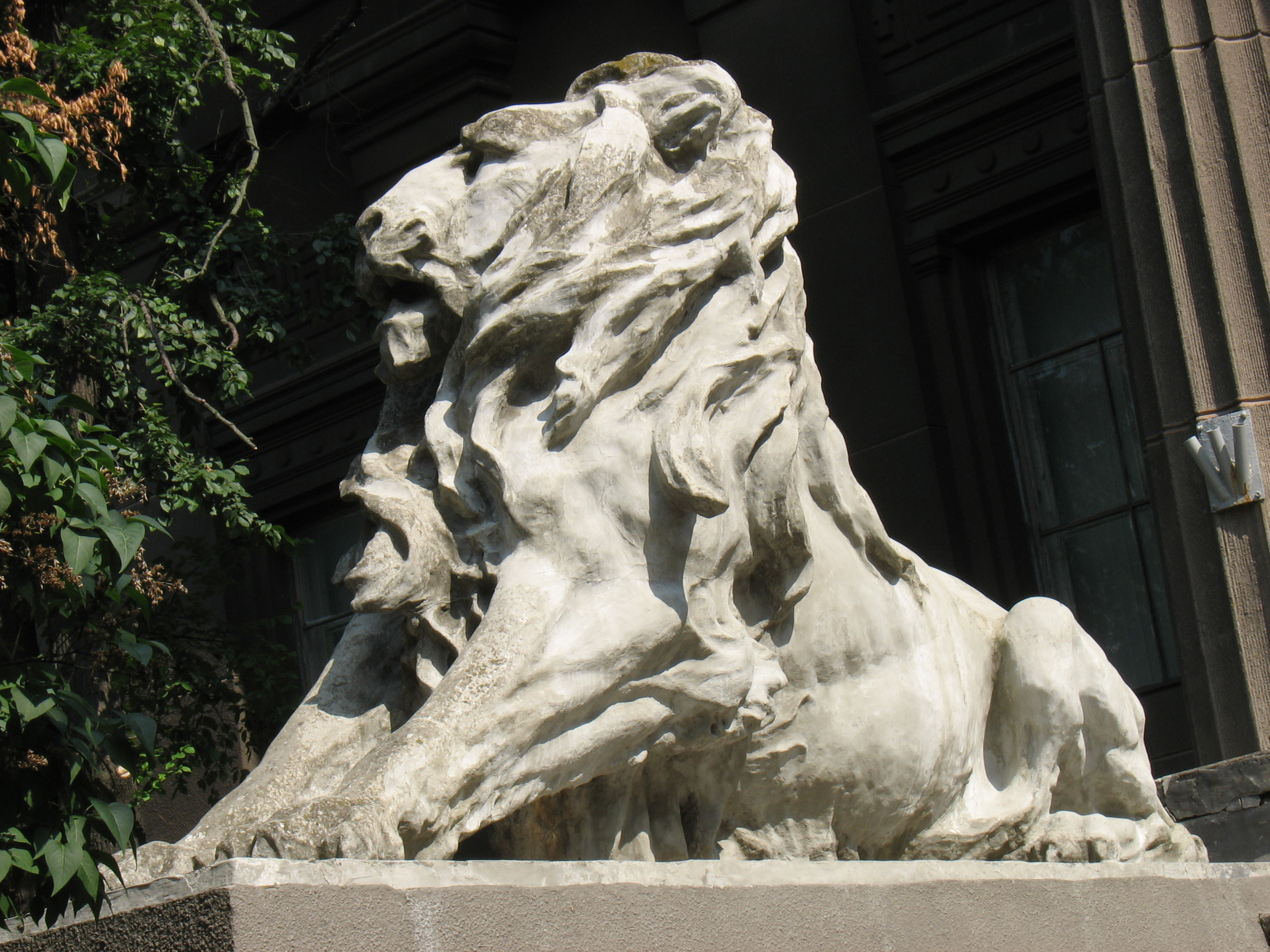
One of the museum's concrete lions

It is located in a building constructed in 1898 by architect Władysław Horodecki for the Kyiv City Museum. It was a reworking of a project of the Moscow architect Petr Boytsov who failed to receive a government license. The building was originally designed as a museum for the local society of patrons of arts and antique lovers. The facade of the building conveys a neoclassical architecture form – precise reproduction of a six-column porch of Doric order with entablature, triglyphs, metopes and frieze decoration depicting the Triumph of Arts. The architectural composition featuring figures of gryphons and large concrete lions at the top of the stairs were created by an Italian sculptor, Emilio Sala. On the construction of the building was expended 249,000 rubles with only 100,000 paid by the imperial government. Another 108,000 rubles were paid by the Tereshchenko family who also created the Museum of Western and Oriental Art in Kyiv. At first, at the first floor was located exhibition of the Russian archeologist Vikentiy Khvoyka who moved to Kyiv from the Kingdom of Bohemia. The museum officially opened just before Christmas on December 23, 1904, as the Kyiv Industrial Arts and Science museum of Emperor Nicholas II. Its first director was Mykola Biliashivsky.

== Collections ==
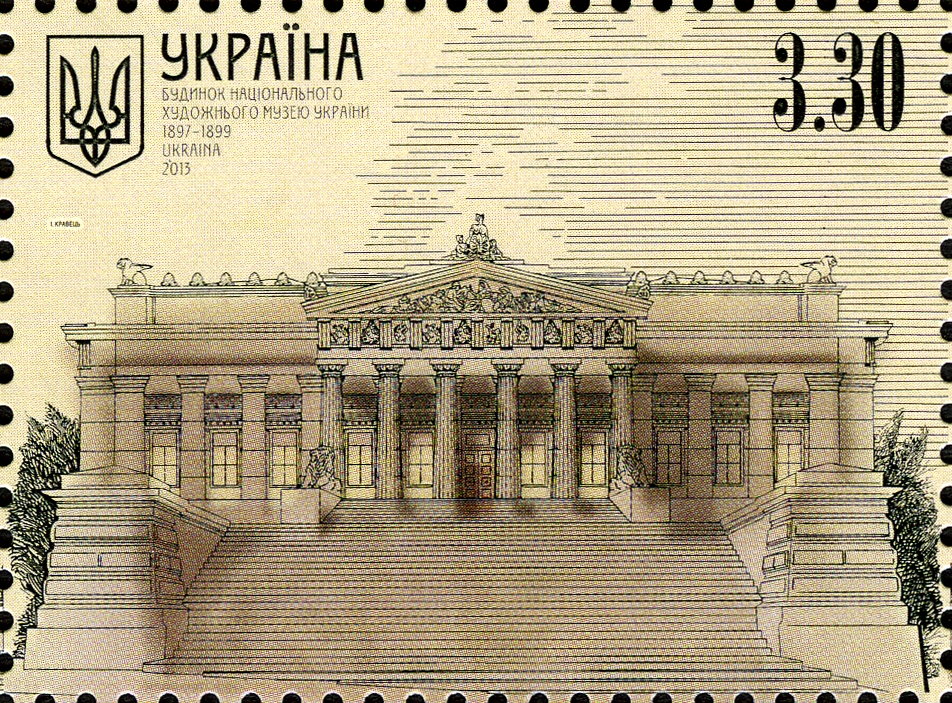
2013 Ukrainian stamp portraying the museum

The National Art Museum of Ukraine has the most representative collection of Ukrainian figurative art in the world. The collection numbers almost 40 thousand exhibits, among which masterpieces of Ukrainian painting, sculpture, and graphics from Kievan Rus' age to nowadays are represented.

The musem's icon collection includes the polychrome wooden relief "Saint George with hagiography" dated to the 12th century, "Hodegetria" from Volhynia, "St. George The Dragon Slayer," and "The Passion of the Christ" from Halychyna region.

The collection of Ukrainian Baroque includes icons such as "The Intercession with the Portrait of Bohdan Khmelnytsky" (first half of the 18th century, Kyiv region), a pair of icons depicting the Great Martyrs Anastasia and Juliania, Barbara and Catherine (18th century, Northern Left Bank), icons from Kyiv Pechersk Lavra workshops from the iconostasis of Dormition Cathedral Entrance to Jerusalem and The Nativity (1729). The iconostasis from Berezna village (Chernihiv region, 1860s) is one of the highlights of the collection.

The museum also holds a collection of 18th century Ukrainian portraits which represent the first secular genre in Ukrainian painting. The collection of folk paintings "Cossack the Bandura Player" is one of the largest in the museum.

The museum's display of 19th century art opens with works of Ukrainian portraitists whose lives were connected with the capital city of the Russian Empire — Dmytro Levytsky and Vladimir Borovikovsky. Taras Shevchenko occupies a special place in the history of Ukrainian art with paintings and graphic works that allude to the new democratic tendencies in Ukrainian figurative art.

A monographic collection of Mykola Pymonenko's works illustrates the move from realism to impressionism. Also included are works by the Odessa school, led by Kyriak Kostandi, the classical portraits by H. Vasko, A. Mokrytskiy and O. Rokachevskiy, and landscape paintings by V. Shternberg, V. Orlovkiy, S. Svitoslavskiy and S. Vasylkivskiy. A monographic collection of Oleksandr Murashko, an art reformer in the early 20th century, is of special interest.

Vivid and original heritage of Ukrainian avant-garde represented in the museum is shown by the works of the world-wide famous sculptor Alexander Archipenko, painters Aleksandra Ekster, Alexis Gritchenko, Alexander Bogomazov, and Victor Palmov. A unique trend in Ukrainian art of 1910s–1930s (called after its leading artist, Mykhailo Boychuk) "Boychukism" is introduced in one of the exhibition halls. In the Soviet era, boichukists were included into the list of repressed and prohibited painters and only nowadays their art has found a respective place in the museum exposition. The art of totalitarian age, in spite of the dramatic historical collisions, hosted creative individuals, including Fedir Krychevsky, Anatol Petrytsky, Tetyana Yablonska, Serhiy Hryhoriev, and Mykola Hlushchenko.

== Editions ==
Using the informational space for the promotion of Ukrainian artistic culture is an important goal for the National Art Museum of Ukraine.

Despite the lack of own printing resources the Museum gradually establishes issuance of its own printing products.

National Art Museum of Ukraine's Publishing Program has the following streams:

- Popularization of retrospective museum collection of the Ukrainian art;
- Scientific-monographic and self-monographic publications of the outstanding Ukrainian art persons;
- Scientific catalogues to large-scale exhibitions of the National Art Museum of Ukraine;
- "Muzeinyi Provulok (Museum Lane)" magazine.

Publication of the "National Art Museum of Ukraine" art album of significant size and content ("Artania Nova" Publishing House) became an important museum event in 2003. That was because it covered a large volume of information on the museum's past, present and its collections, making this album the first to present the Ukrainian art history in such significant manner.

2004 – following publications were issued

- "Ukrainian Painting of 19th – early 20th century"
- "Ukrainian Icon Painting of 12th – early 19th century"
- "Serhii Vasylkivsky"

From May 2004 – in the focus of attention was

- "Muzeinyi Provulok (Museum Lane)" magazine

2005 – published

- monographic album "Oleksandr Murashko"

2006 – issued

- "Ukrainian Painting of 20th – early 21st century"
- "Ukrainian Portrait of XVII-XVIII centuries"
- monographs "Mykola Pymonenko, V. Orlovskiy"
- "S.Svitoslavskiy"
- "Ukrainian Modernism"
- 6th number of "Muzeinyi Provulok (Museum Lane)" magazine

2007– 2008 – published

- 7, 8 and 9 numbers of "Muzeinyi Provulok (Museum Lane)" magazine

== Contemporary exhibitions ==
Today, the museum continues to expand its collection. Some new additions include a unique icon relief of St. George and works by the international Kyiv born pioneer of Geometric abstract art Kazimir Malevich.

The current exhibition includes over 20 thousand pieces. Among many are works by a now world-renowned constructivist Vasiliy Yermilov, and Cubo-Futurist Alexander Bogomazov. The Ukrainian side is represented by works of famous Ukrainian and Russian artists, such as David Burliuk, Aleksandra Ekster, Vadim Meller, Kliment Red'ko, Solomon Nikritin, Victor Palmov, Maria Sinyakova, Mykhailo Boychuk, Mykola Pymonenko, Ilya Shtilman and many others.

On April 26, 2014, art retrieved from former president Victor Yanukovich's home was exhibited at the museum.

The Museum collects unofficial art works of the Soviet period — Ukrainian underground from the end of 1950 until 1991, particularly artworks by Feodosiy Tetianych, Mykola Trehub, Vudon Baklytskyi, Olena Golub and others.

== Gallery ==
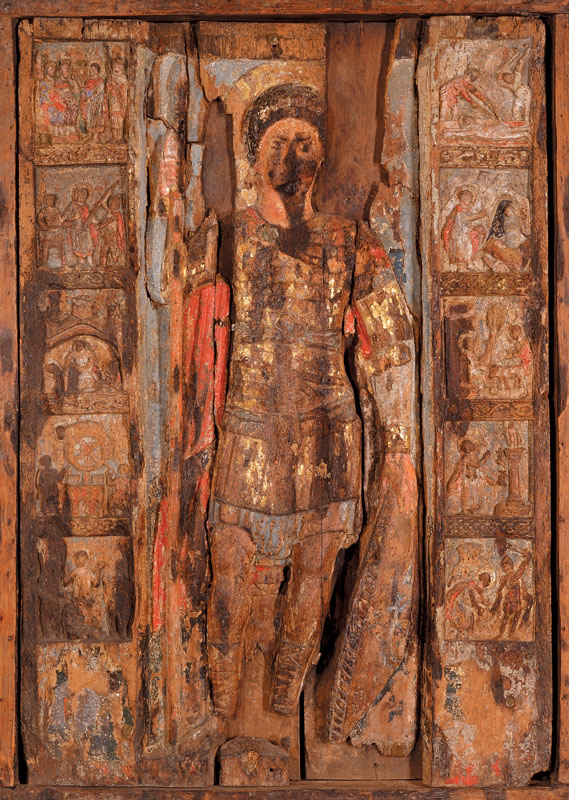
Saint George, 12th century

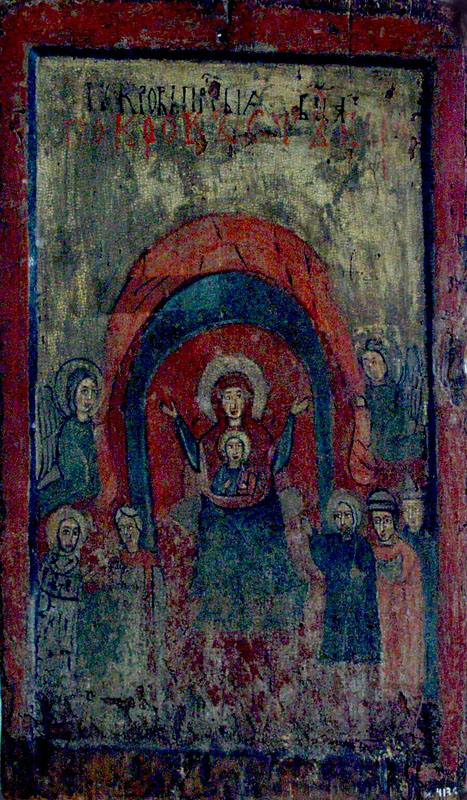
Pokrova (12-13th century)

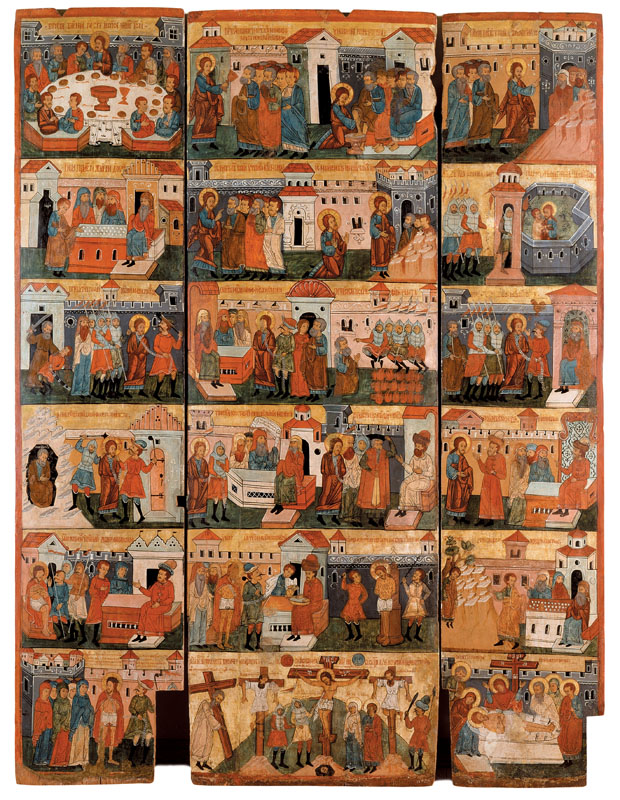
Passion of Jesus (16th century)

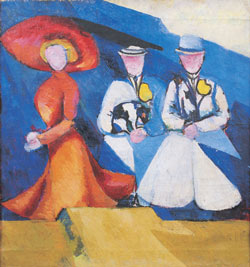
Aleksandra Ekster, Three women's figures (1909–1910), oil on canvas

Mykola Pymonenko, Harvester (1889), oil on canvas

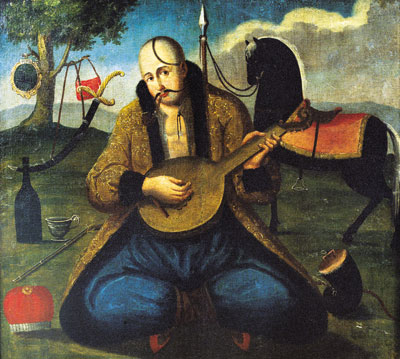
The Cossack bandura player (19th century), oil on canvas.

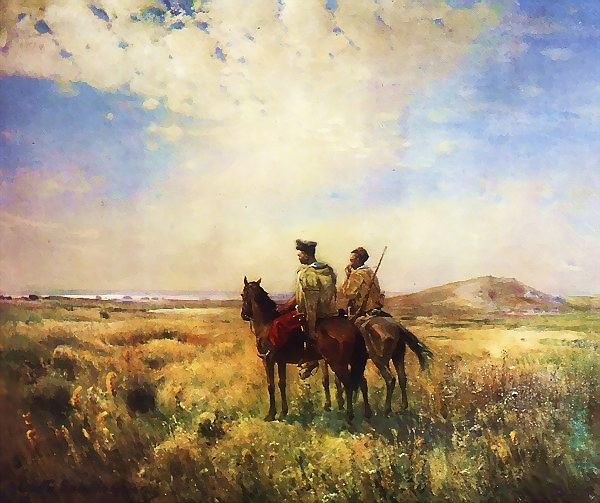
Serhiy Vasylkivsky, Cossacks in the Steppe (1900s), oil on canvas.

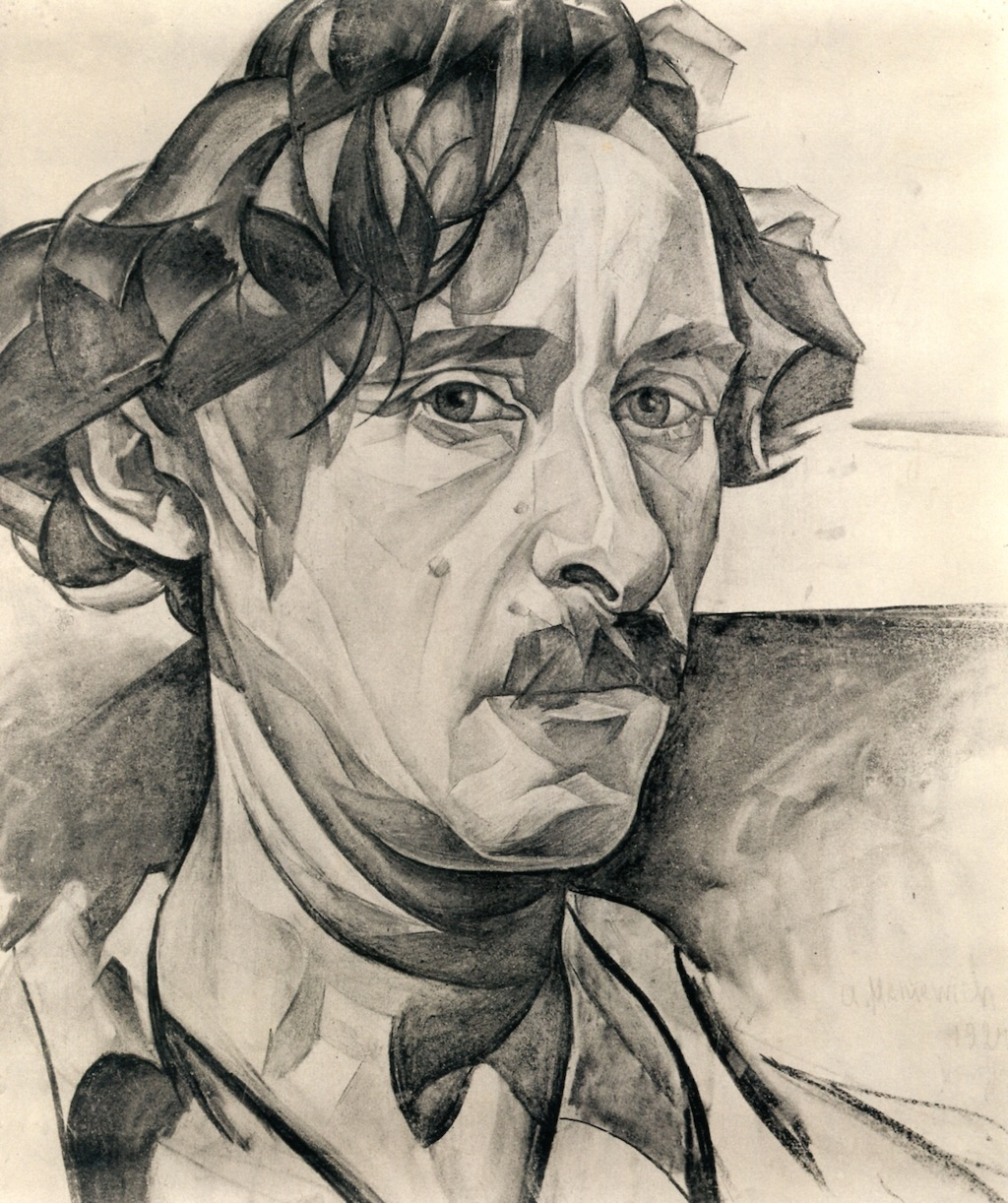
Abraham Manievich, Self-Portrait

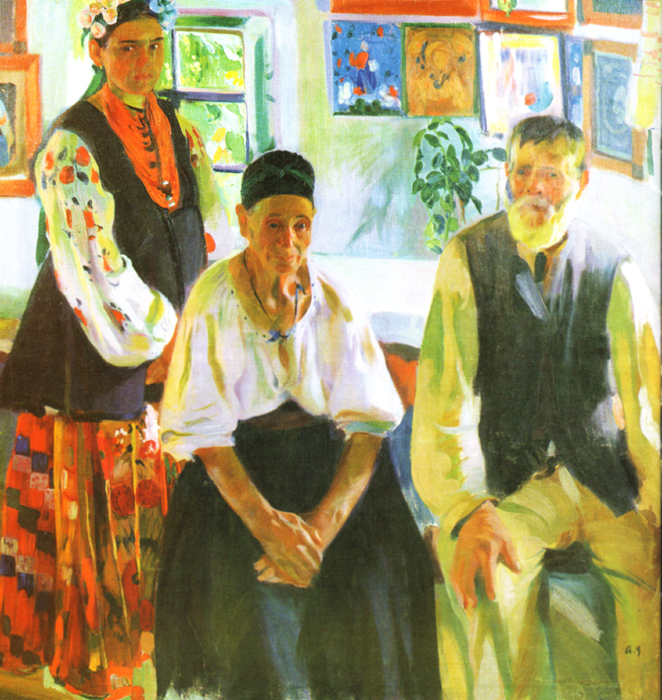
Oleksandr Murashko, Selianska

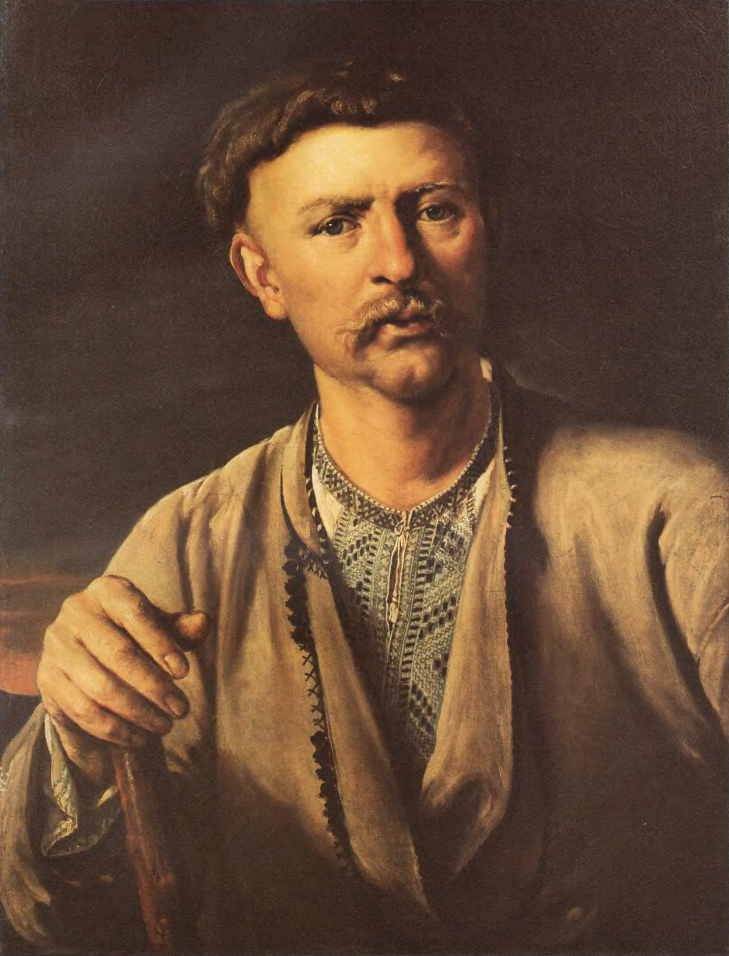
Vasily Tropinin, Ukrainian man

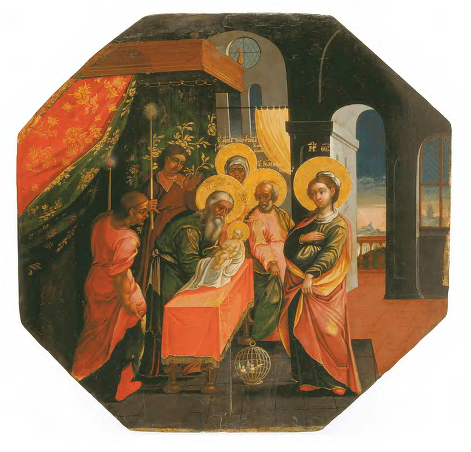
The Presentation of Christ in the Temple (1729)

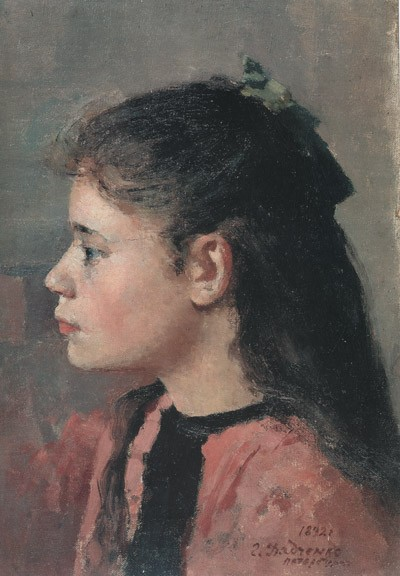
Hryhorij Djadtschenko, Portrait of a girl (1892)
