= Kostiantyn Piskorskyi =

Konstiantyn Volodymyrovych Piskorskyi (May 6, 1892, Kyiv - March 9, 1922, Kyiv) was a Ukrainian avant-garde artist, graphic artist, son of the historian Volodymyr Piskorsky, and brother of the graphic artist Elizaveta Piskorska.

At the time of entering the Ukrainian Academy of Arts in the graphics workshop of Professor Georgy Narbut, 27-year-old Konstiantyn Piskorskyi already had his own established style, highly appreciated by his contemporaries. He worked with watercolors, ink, bronze, and silver in the styles of secession, futurism, and abstraction. The artist's work demonstrates that artistic pursuits and discoveries in Ukraine developed in parallel with European ones.

== Sources ==
- Митці України : Енциклопедичний довідник / упоряд. : М. Г. Лабінський, В. С. Мурза; за ред. А. В. Кудрицького. — К. : «Українська енциклопедія» ім. М. П. Бажана, 1992. — 848 с. — ISBN 5-88500-042-5. — С. 462.
- Мистецтво України : Біографічний довідник / упоряд.: А. В. Кудрицький, М. Г. Лабінський; за ред. А. В. Кудрицького. — К. : «Українська енциклопедія» ім. М. П. Бажана, 1997. — 700 с. — ISBN 5-88500-071-9. — С. 477.
- Костянтин Піскорський: Альбом. — Київ, 2006. ISBN 966-7845-27-3
- Художник інших світів: З творчої спадщини К. Піскорського (1892—1922) Київ, 2003.
