= Ilya Shtilman =

- Илья Нисонович Штильман
- Born: 3 December [O.S. 20 November] 1902; Kyiv, Russian Empire
- Died: 11 August 1966 (aged 63); Kyiv, USSR
- Resting place: Baikove Cemetery; 50°25.00′N 30°30.35′E
- Known for: Painting, Drawing

Ilya Shtilman (3 December [O.S. 20 November] 1902 – 11 August 1966) was a Soviet painter, art teacher and professor (from 1947) who was born and died in Kyiv.

== The artistic heritage ==
Works of Ilya Shtilman are located in various museums such as: the State Tretyakov Gallery (Russia), the National Art Museum of Ukraine, The National Academy of Fine Arts and Architecture of Ukraine, most of the major museums and private collections of Ukraine, USA, Canada, Germany and Israel. Some of the most famous works include:

- "Musicians in the Jewish wedding" (1927);
- "Urban Landscape" (1936);
- Series of landscapes "Dnepr dressed in granite" (1936–37);
- Portrait of the Artist Shovkunenko A. (1939);
- "Outskirts of Samarkand" (1943);
- "Zagorsk Winter" (1943);
- "Winter" (1946);
- "Wind" (1947);
- "Vladimir Hill" (1947);
- Portrait of the artist Kasia B. (1947);
- "Field" (1950);
- "The storm is approaching" (1951);
- "Lilac and lilies of the valley" (1952);
- "A month went up" (1953);
- "Kanevsky Carpathians. Chernecha Mountain "(1963);
- "Apple trees" (1965); and
- "Sednevskie given" (1966).

== Exhibitions ==
Exhibitions of Ilya Shtilman's works have been organized at the National Art Museum of Ukraine in:

- 1970,
- 1982 (80th anniversary),
- 1992 (90th anniversary), and
- 2003 (100th anniversary).
