= Alexander Khvostenko-Khvostov =

Russian/Ukrainian/Soviet avant-garde artist

Alexander (Oleksandr) Khvostenko-Khvostov
- Born: April 4, 1895; Borisovka
- Died: February 16, 1967 (aged 71); Kyiv
- Education: Moscow School of Painting, Sculpture and Architecture
- Movement: Constructivist

Alexander (Oleksandr) Khvostenko-Khvostov (Ukrainian: Олександр Веніамінович Хвостенко-Хвостов; April 4, 1895 – February 16, 1967) was a Russian/Ukrainian/Soviet avant-garde artist (Constructivist), and stage designer.

== Biography ==
Oleksandr Khvostenko-Khvostov was born in the village of Borisovka, now part of the Belgorod Oblast (Russia) on the 17 April (4 April O.S) 1895.

From 1907 to 1917 Alexander studied at the Moscow School of Painting, Sculpture and Architecture (MUZHZV). In 1917 he became a member of the Moscow Professional Union of Artists in Moscow together with Kazimir Malevich, Aleksandra Ekster, Vadym Meller and Vladimir Tatlin. From 1918 to 1919 he studied in the studio of Aleksandra Ekster in Kiev, Ukraine.

From 1920 to 1921 he designed posters and advertising boards. After 1920 he made numerous designs for ballets and operas in Kharkiv and Kiev, mainly in the Constructivist style.

In 1926 he cooperated in the production of Prokofiev's Love for the three Oranges (one of his most experimental projects that was not performed) in Kharkiv. In 1927 he participated in the All-Ukrainian Exhibition Ten Years October together with Alexander Bogomazov, Vadym Meller, Vladimir Tatlin, Victor Palmov, Anatol Petrytsky, Mark Epshtein.

Oleksandr Khvostenko-Khvostov died 16 February 1967 in Kiev.
