= Victor Palmov =

Russian and Ukrainian painter

- Виктор Пальмов
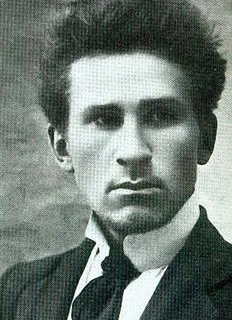
- Born: September 29, 1888; Samara, Samara Governate, Russian Empire
- Died: July 7, 1929 (aged 40); Kyiv, Ukrainian SSR, USSR
- Resting place: Lukyanivske Cemetery, Kyiv, Ukraine

Victor Nikandrovich Palmov (Russian: Виктор Никандрович Пальмов; 10 October 1888 – 7 June 1929) was a Russian and Ukrainian painter and avant-garde artist (Futurist and Neo-primitivist) from the David Burliuk circle.

== Life ==
Victor Palmov was born on 10 October 1888 in Samara, in Samara Governorate of the Russian Empire. From 1911–1914, he studied at the Moscow School of Painting, Sculpture and Architecture. From 1920–1921, he travelled to Japan with David Burliuk. In 1923–1924 Palmov was associated with the Moscow magazine Left Front of the Arts (LEF) — organ of the Constructivists and Formalists. Palmov was the founder of the Cvetopisy or Tsv'etopisi (Colour paintings). In 1925 he became the member of the Association of the Revolutionary Art of the Ukraine (ARMU) together with David Burliuk, Vadym Meller, Vasiliy Yermilov, Alexander Bogomazov and Alexander Khvostenko-Khvostov. In 1927 he was the co-founder of the Contemporary Ukrainian Artists Union (OSMU) together with Alexander Khvostenko-Khvostov, Mark Epshtein and Anatol Petrytsky. From 1925 to 1929 he was professor at the Kiev Art Academy (now the National Academy of Visual Arts and Architecture) together with Alexander Bogomazov, Vadym Meller, and Vladimir Tatlin. Victor Palmov died on 7 July 1929 in Kyiv, in the Ukrainian SSR of the Soviet Union.

== Works ==
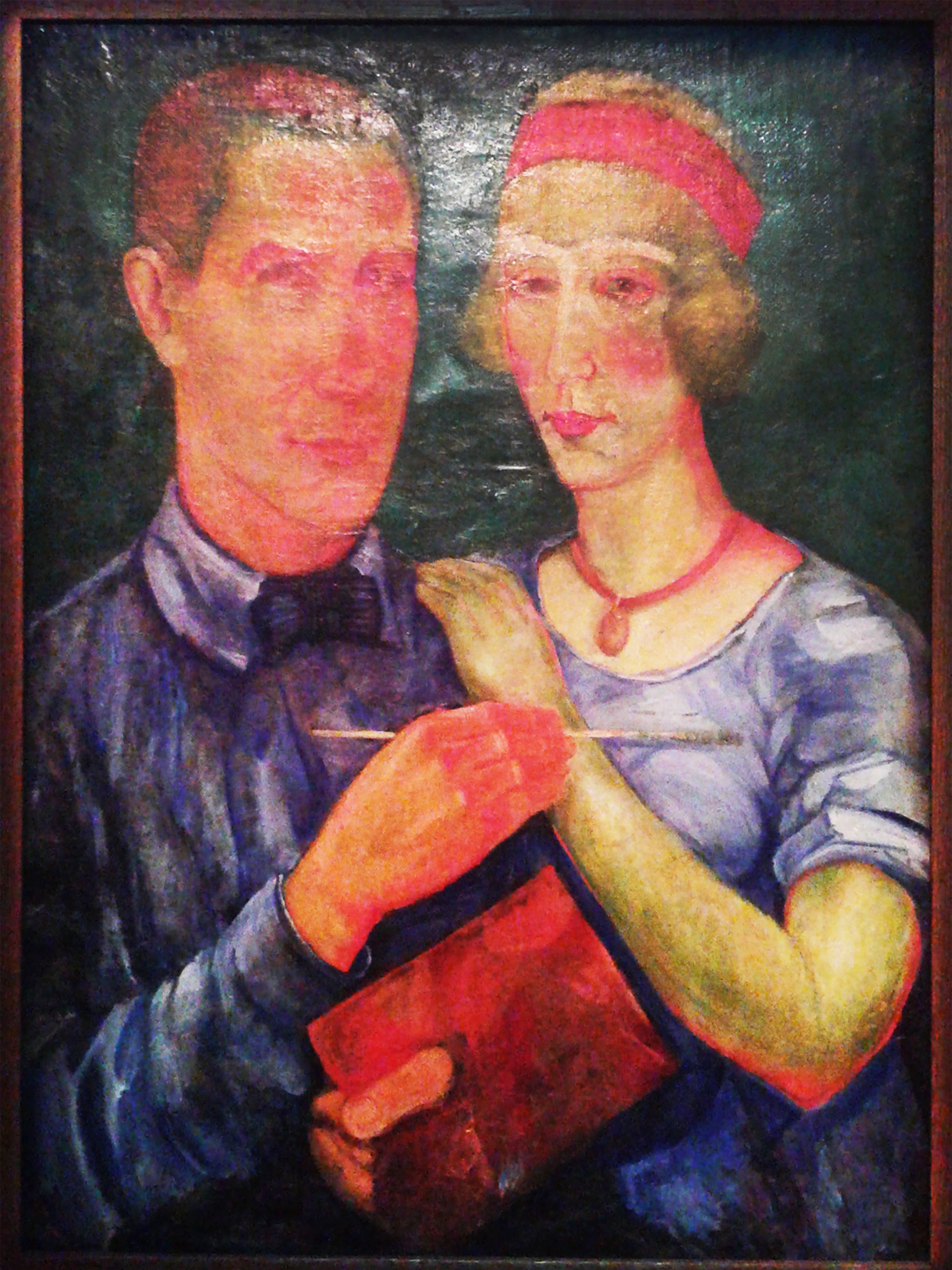
"Portrait with his wife." Collection of I. Dychenko

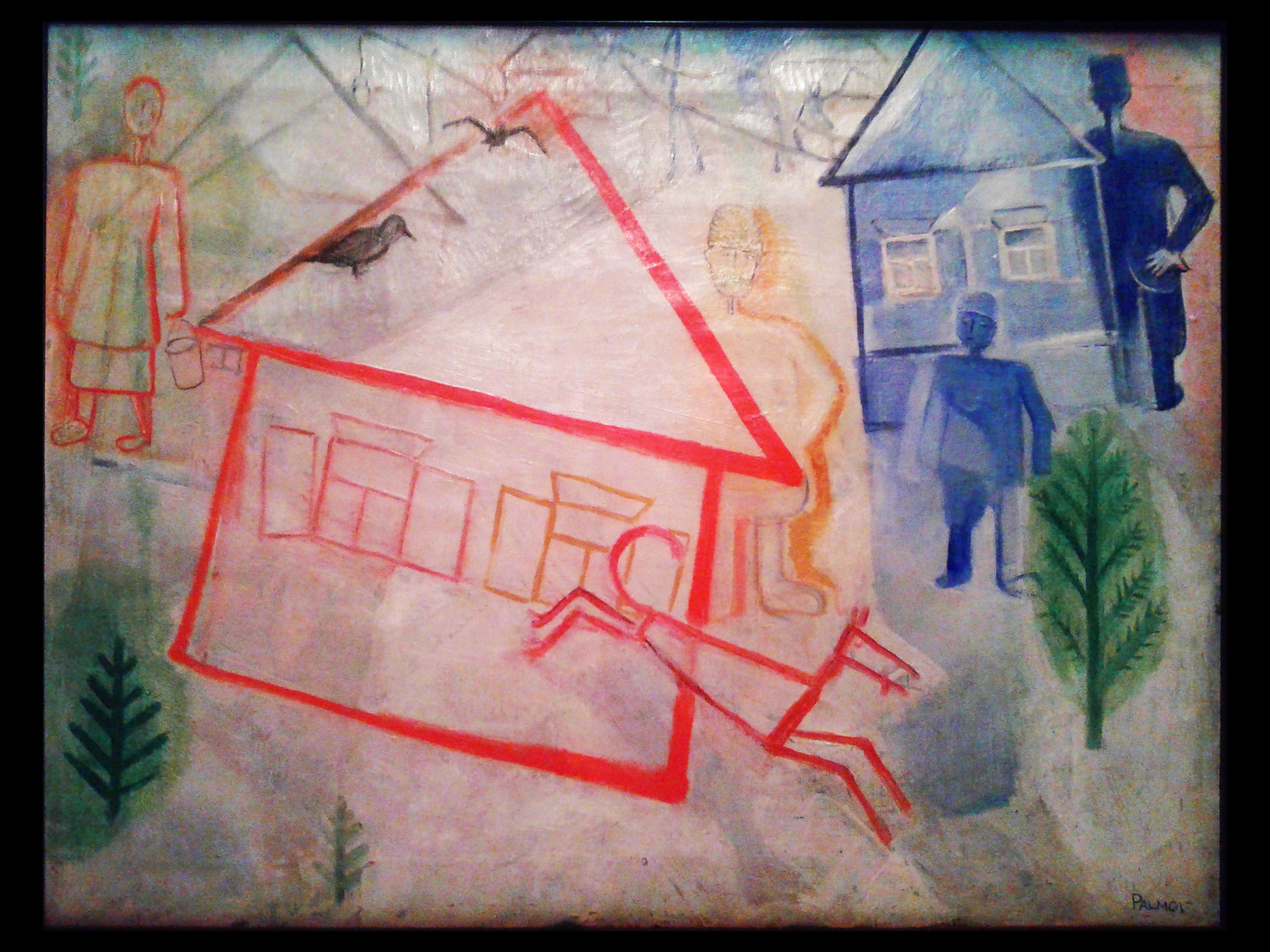
"Ukrainian Village in Winter" (Zeleny Klin), 1919-1920

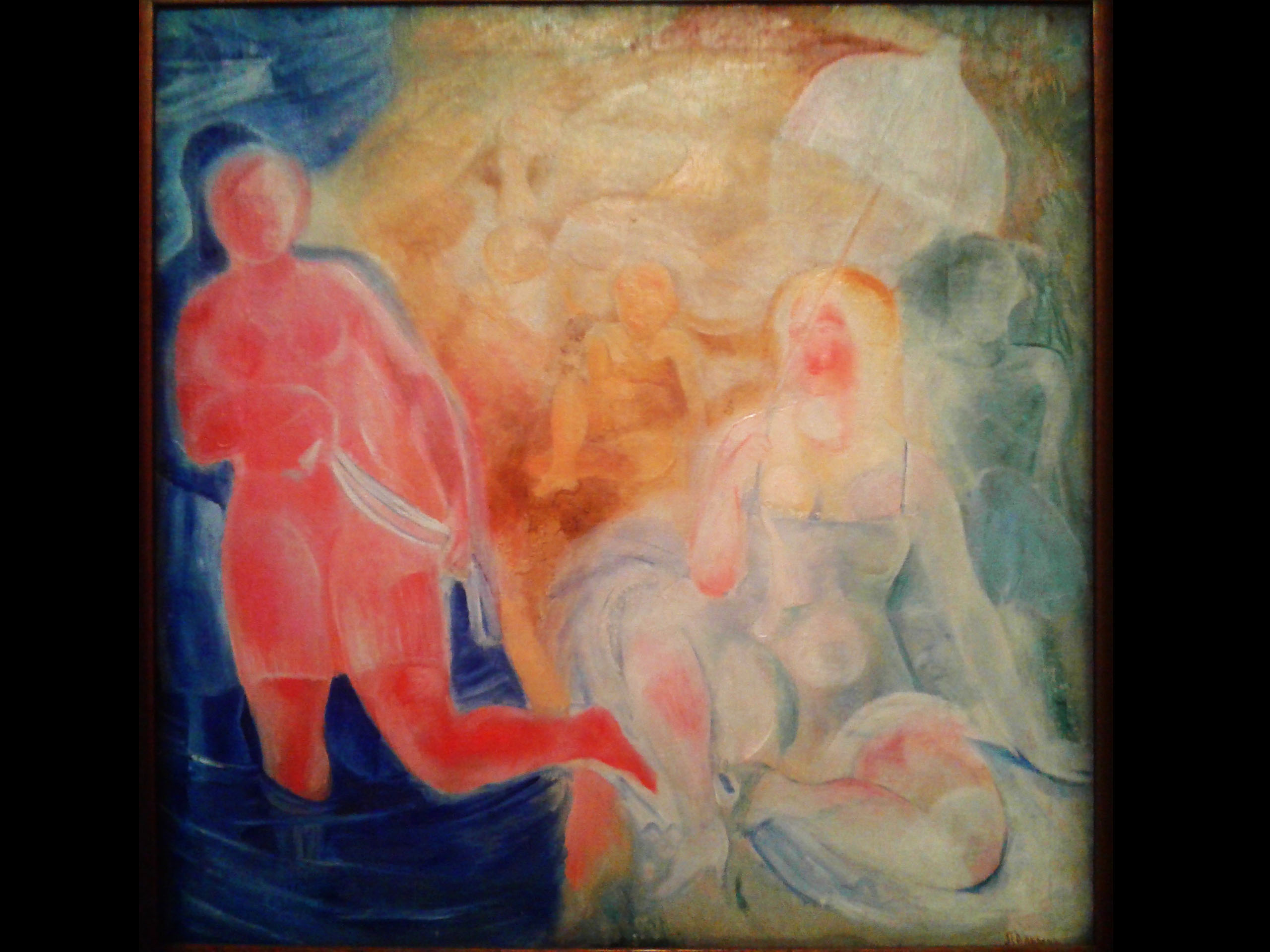
Beach

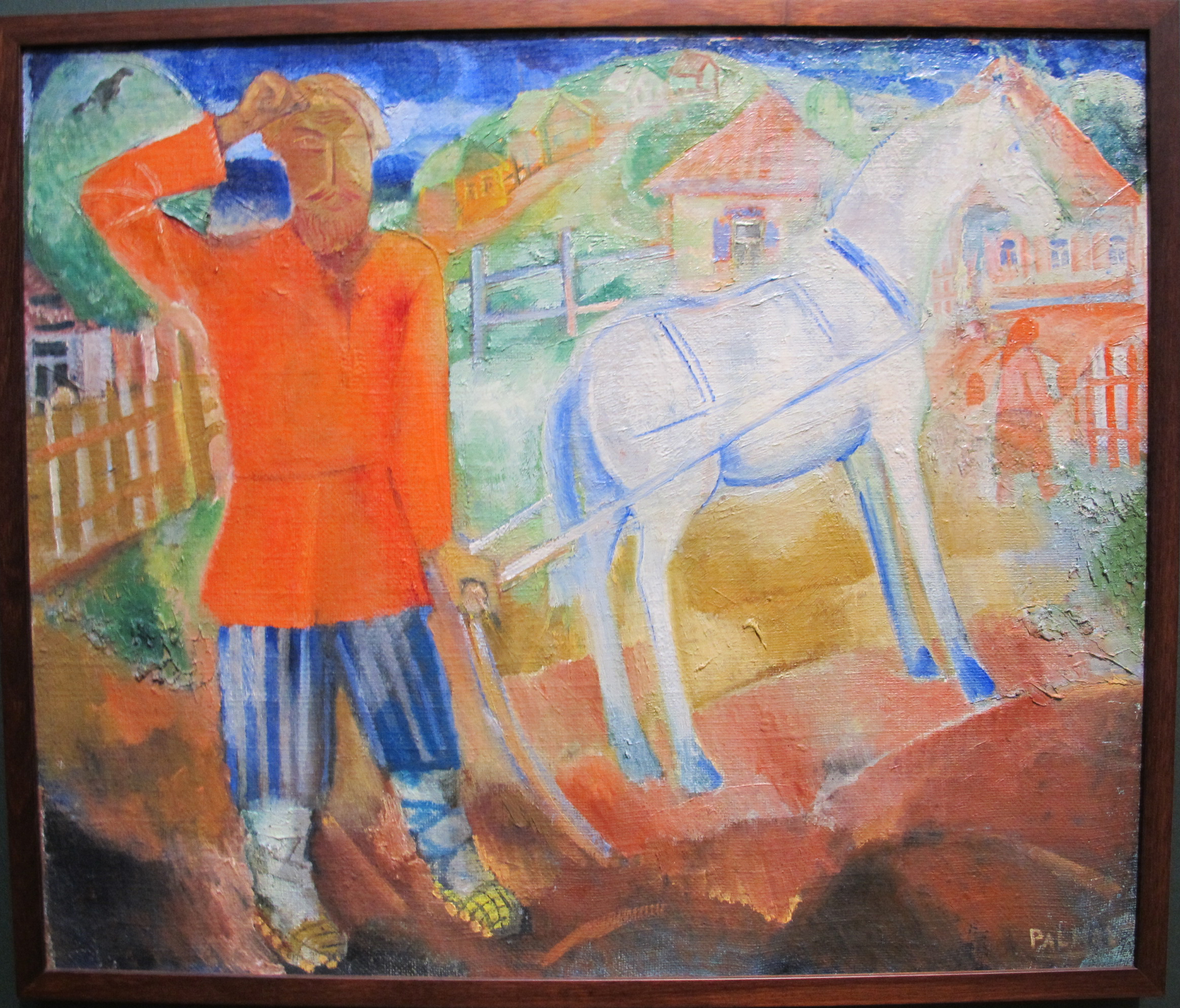
