= Abraham A. Manievich =

American artist (1881–1942)

Abraham Manievich
- Абрам Маневич
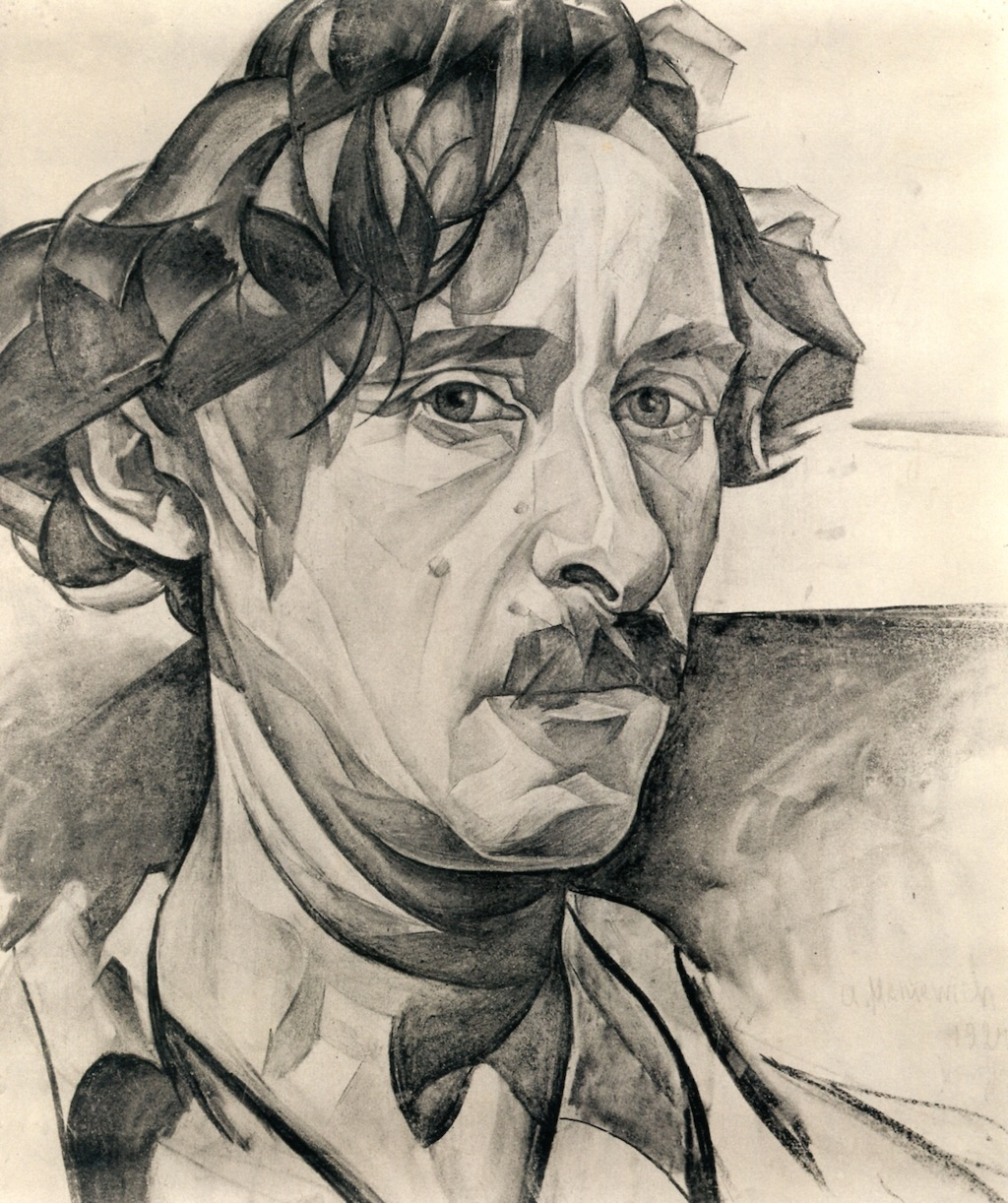
- Self-portrait, 1924
- Born: Abram Anshelovich Manievich; November 25, 1881; Mstislavl, Russian Empire
- Died: June 30, 1942 (aged 60); The Bronx, New York, U.S.
- Other name: Abram Manevich
- Occupation: Artist

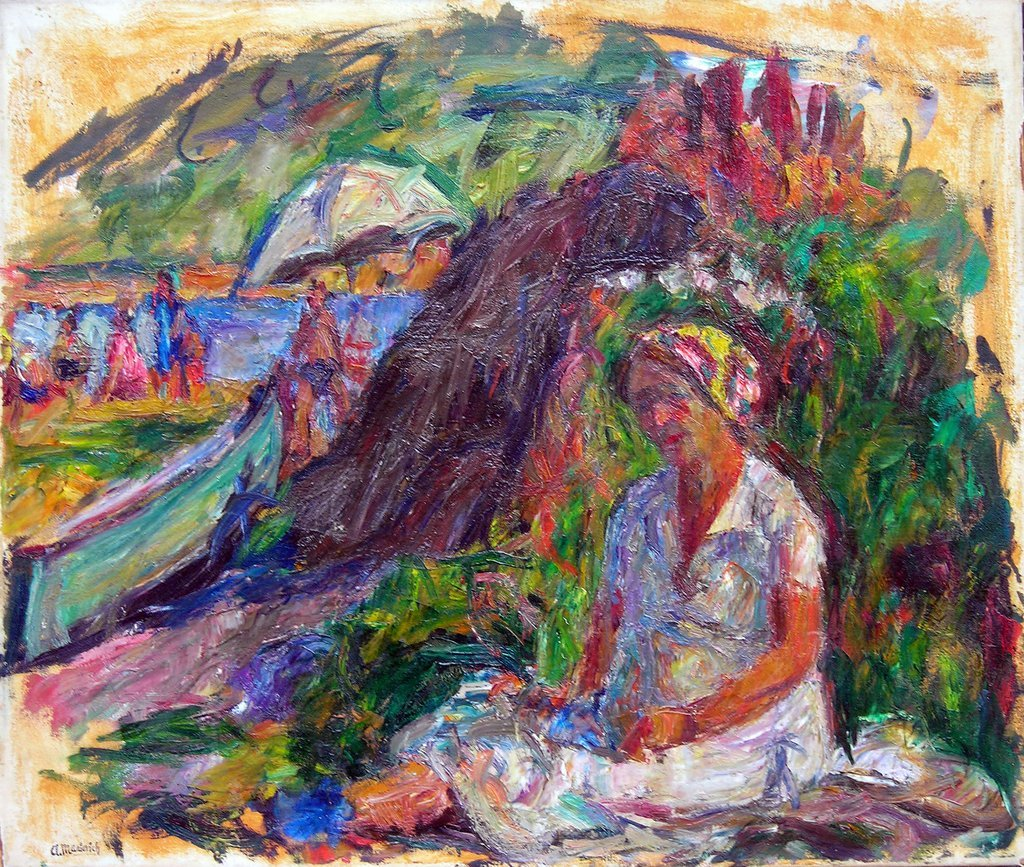
Artist's Wife (1937)

Abraham Anshelovich Manievich (born Abram Anshelovich Manevich; (Note: Ukrainian: Абрам Аншелович Маневич, romanized: Abram Anshelovych Manevych; Belarusian: Абрам Аншэлавіч Маневіч, romanized: Abram Anshelavich Manyevich) 25 November 1881 – 30 June 1942) was an American expressionist artist of Belarusian-Jewish and Ukrainian origin.

== Life ==
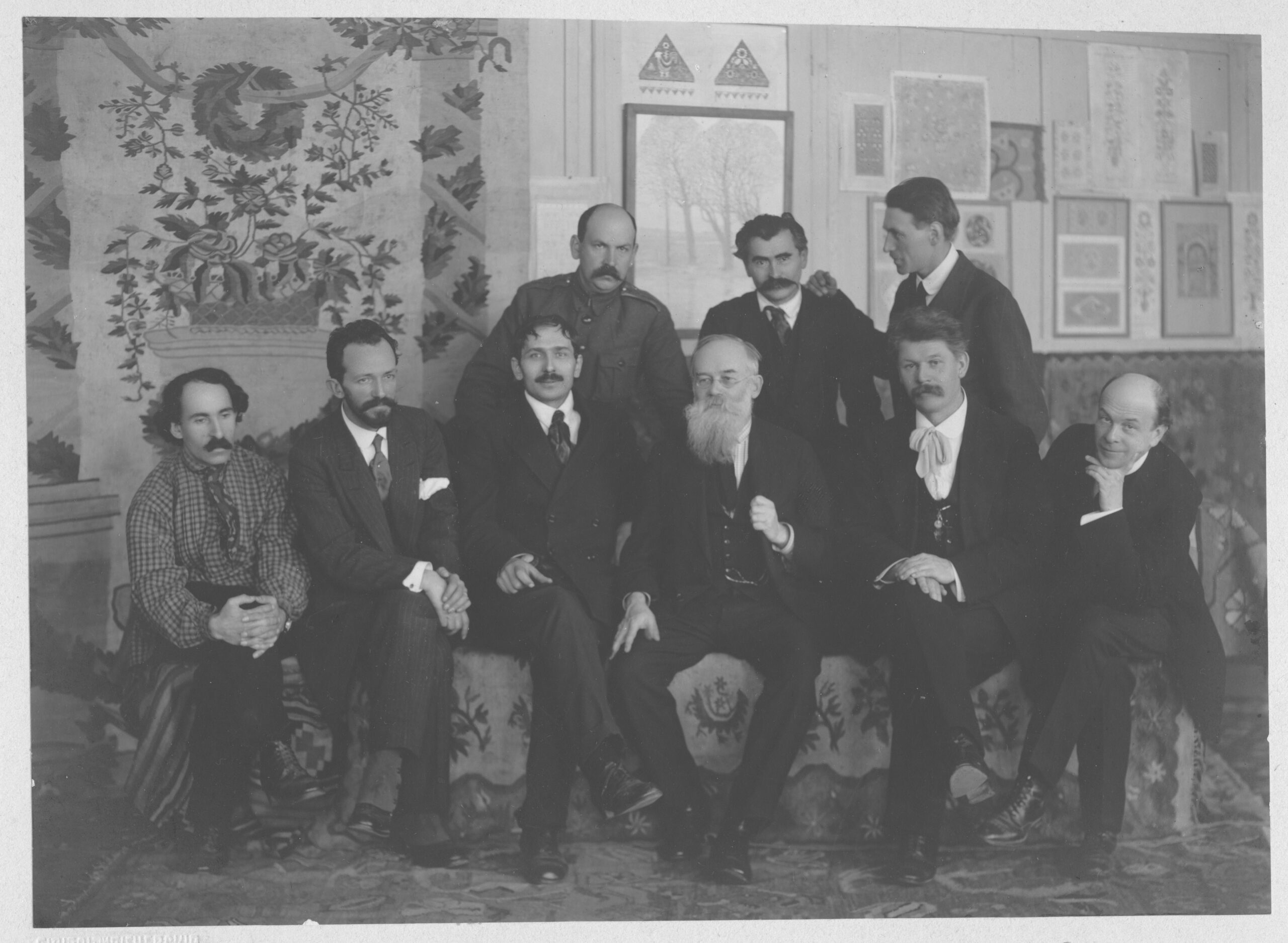
Founders of the Ukrainian academy of arts, 1917: Sitting: Abram Manevich, Oleksandr Murashko, Fedir Krychevsky, Mykhailo Hrushevsky, Ivan Steshenko, Mykola Burachek. Standing: Heorhiy Narbut, Vasyl Krychevsky, Mykhailo Boychuk.

He was born in Mstislavl, Russian Empire (present-day Belarus), and studied art at the Kiev Art School from 1901 to 1905, and at the Academy of Art in Munich, Germany. After travelling and successfully exhibiting in Italy, France, and Switzerland as well as Kiev, he lived in Moscow from 1916 to 1917.

Manievich co-founded the Ukrainian Academy of Arts; he also taught at the Ukrainian Academy of Fine Arts. In 1921, following the death of his son in the pogrom-initiated destruction of the Kiev ghetto, he emigrated to the United States. His continued work enjoyed critical acclaim until his death. He died in The Bronx, New York, in the United States.

His work is in the National Art Museum of Ukraine and in major museums and private collections in the United States, Canada, France, Israel, Russia, and Ukraine. His papers are held at the Archives of American Art.

== Gallery ==
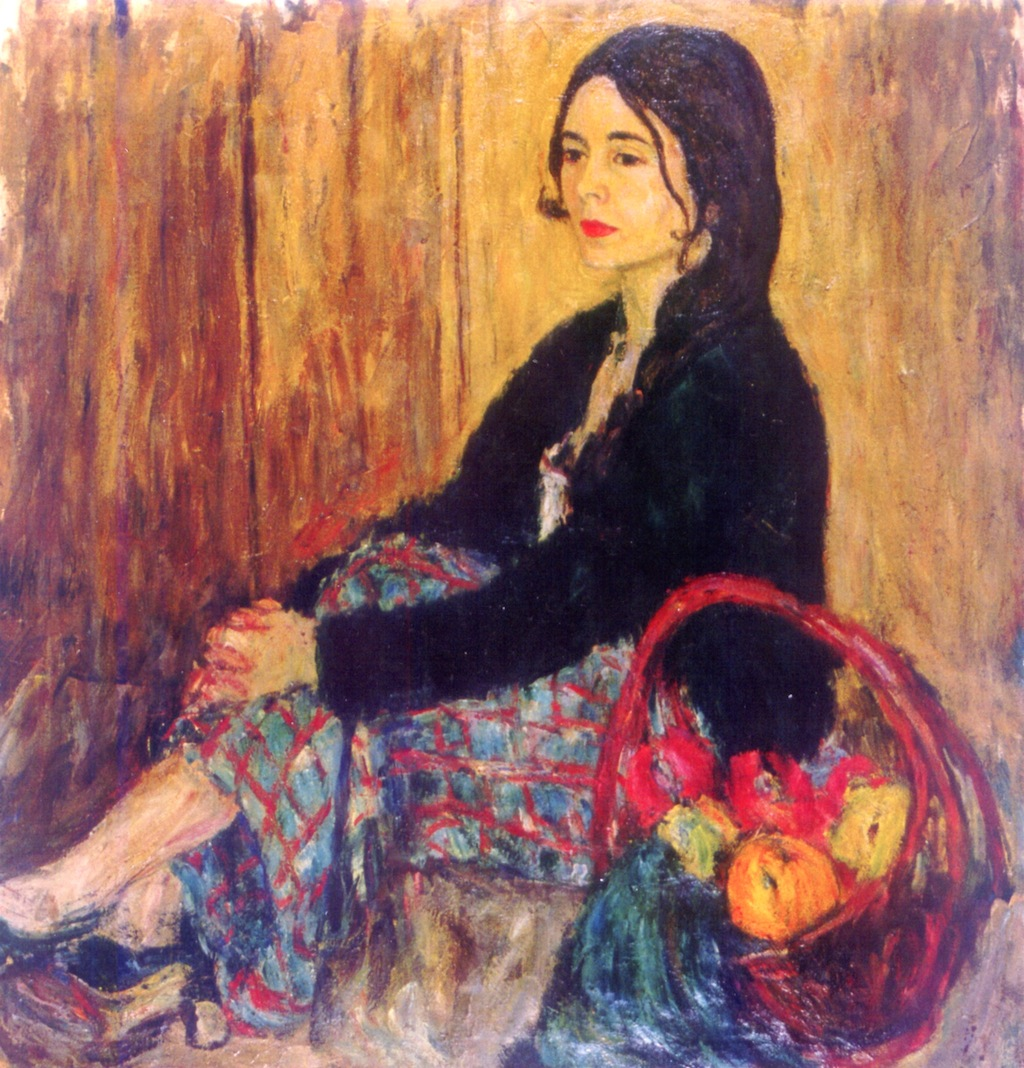

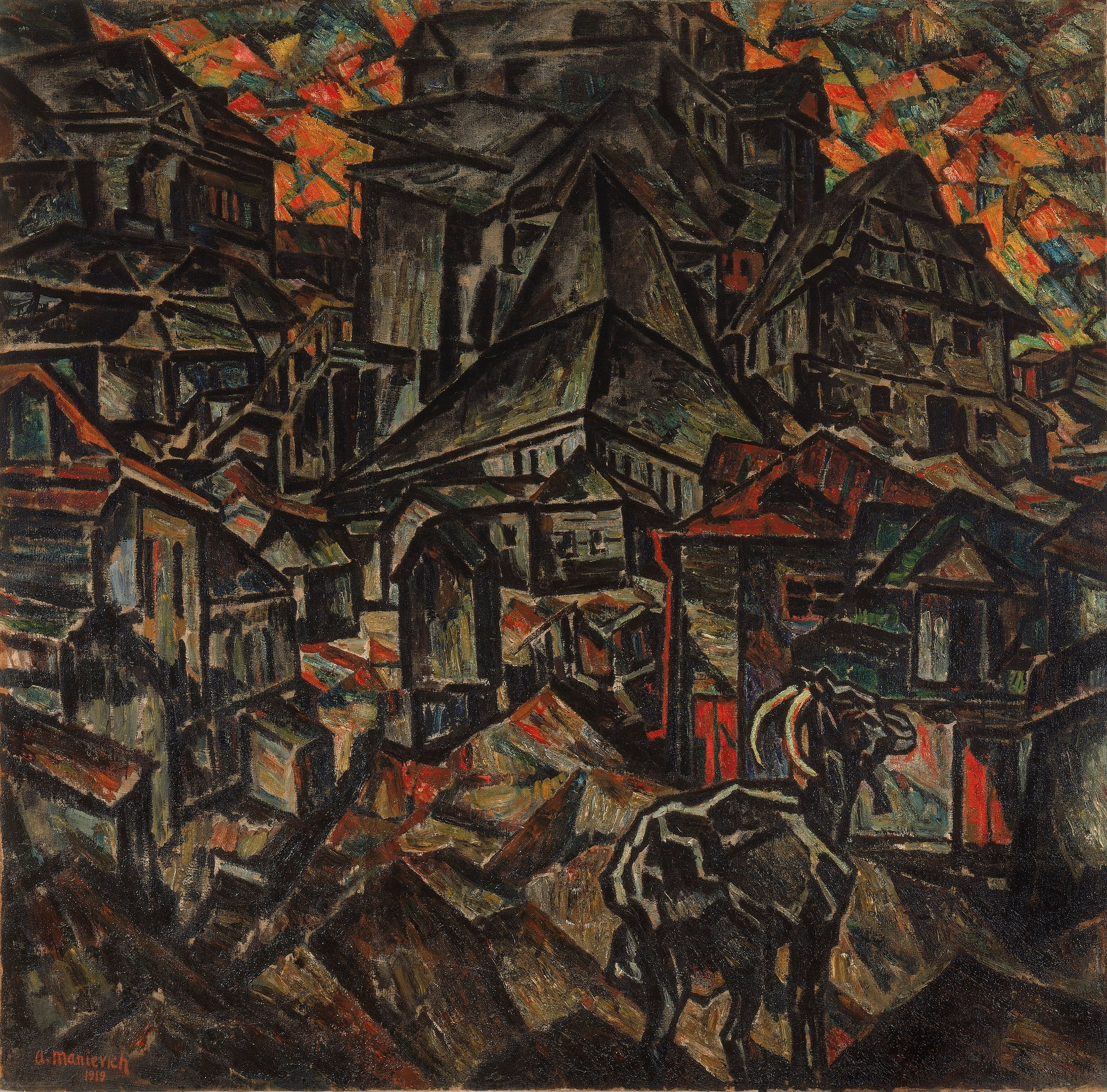
Destruction of the Ghetto, Kiev (1919)

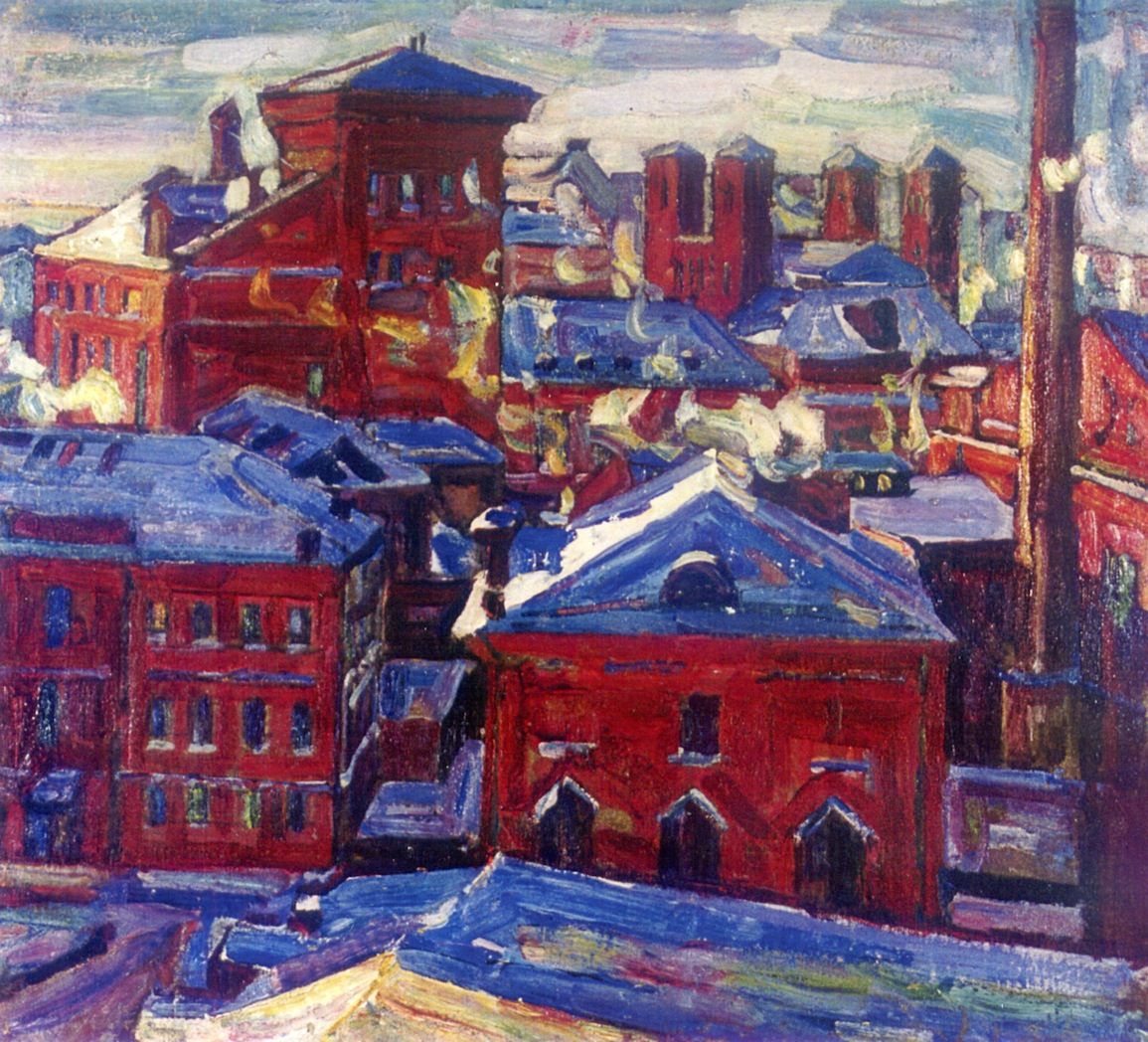

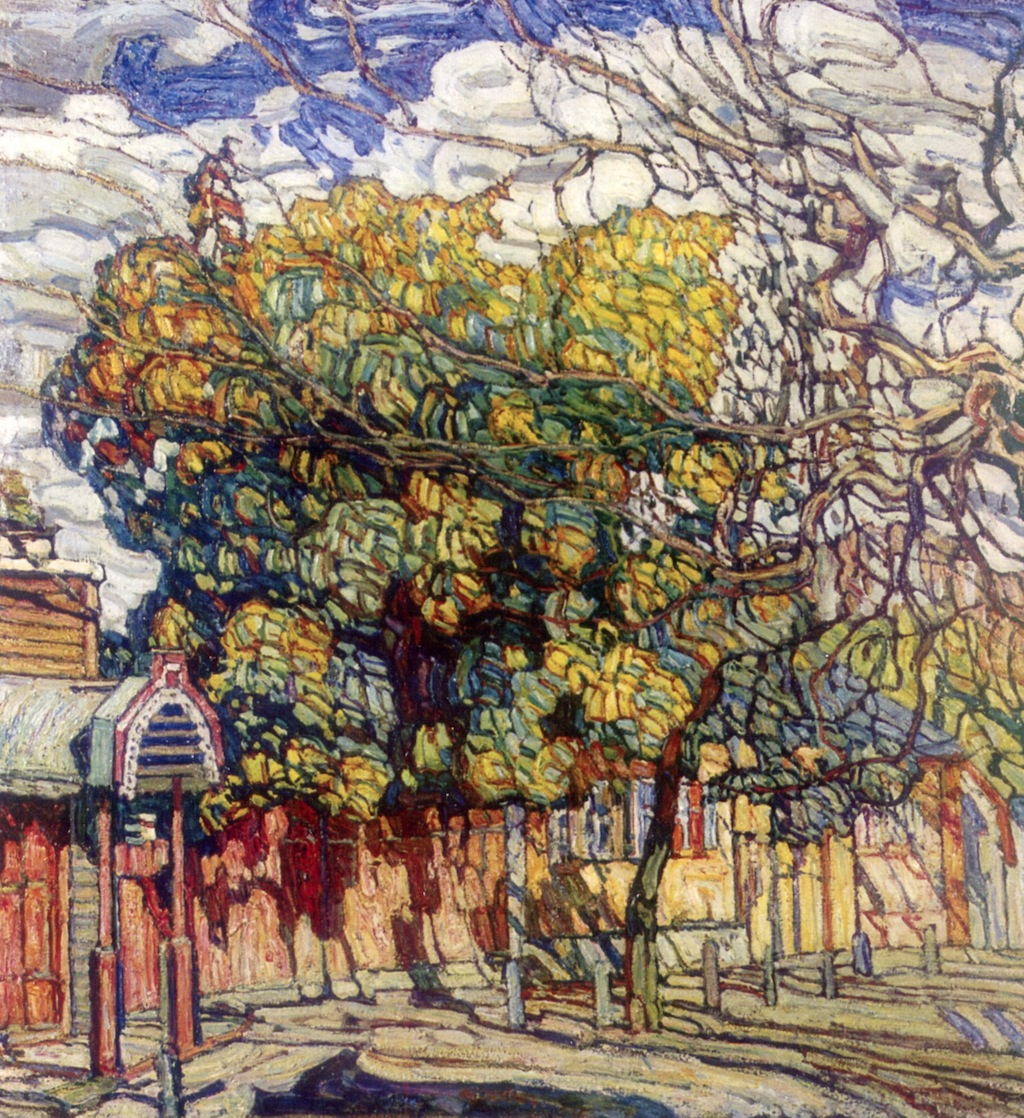

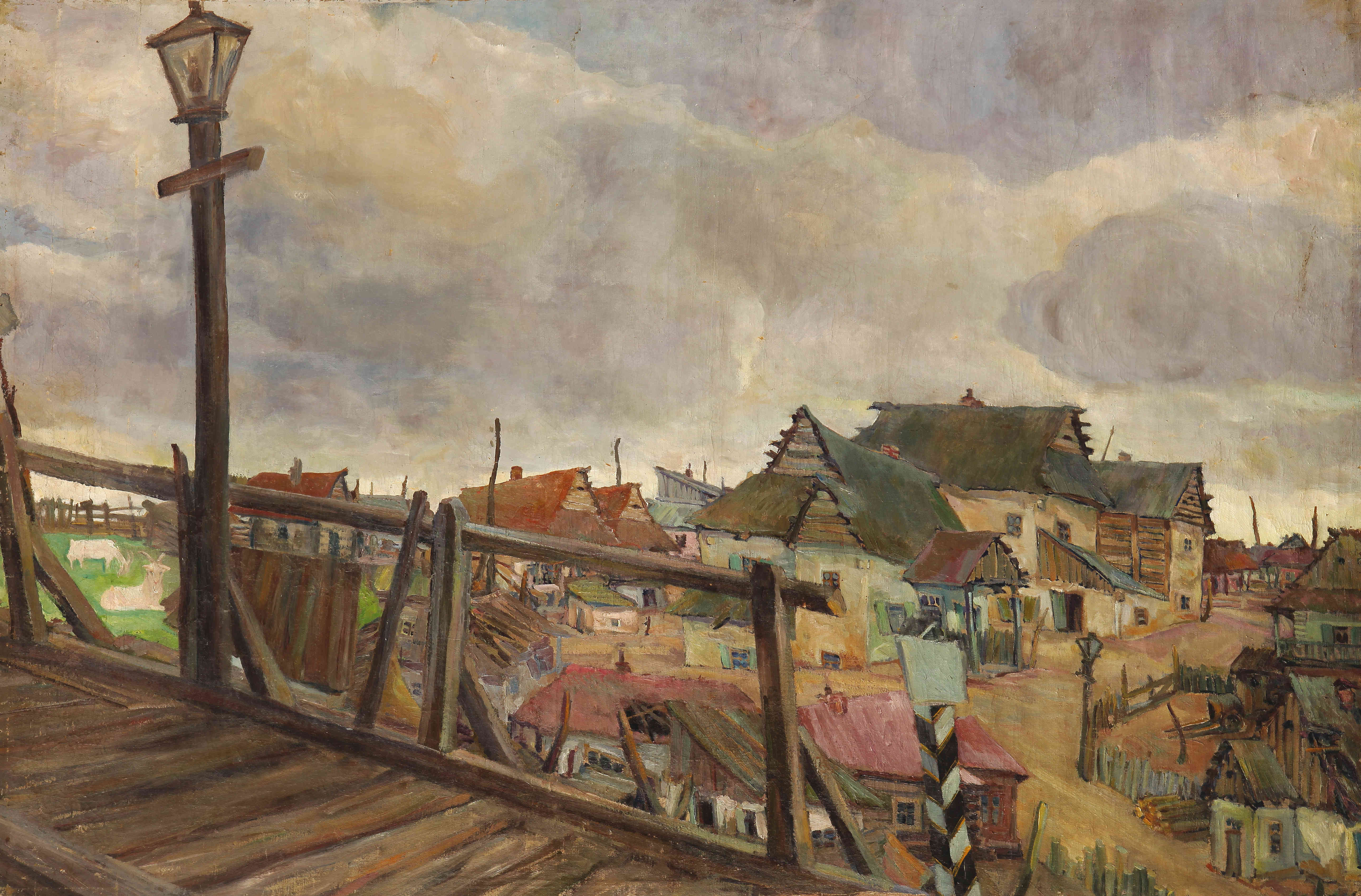

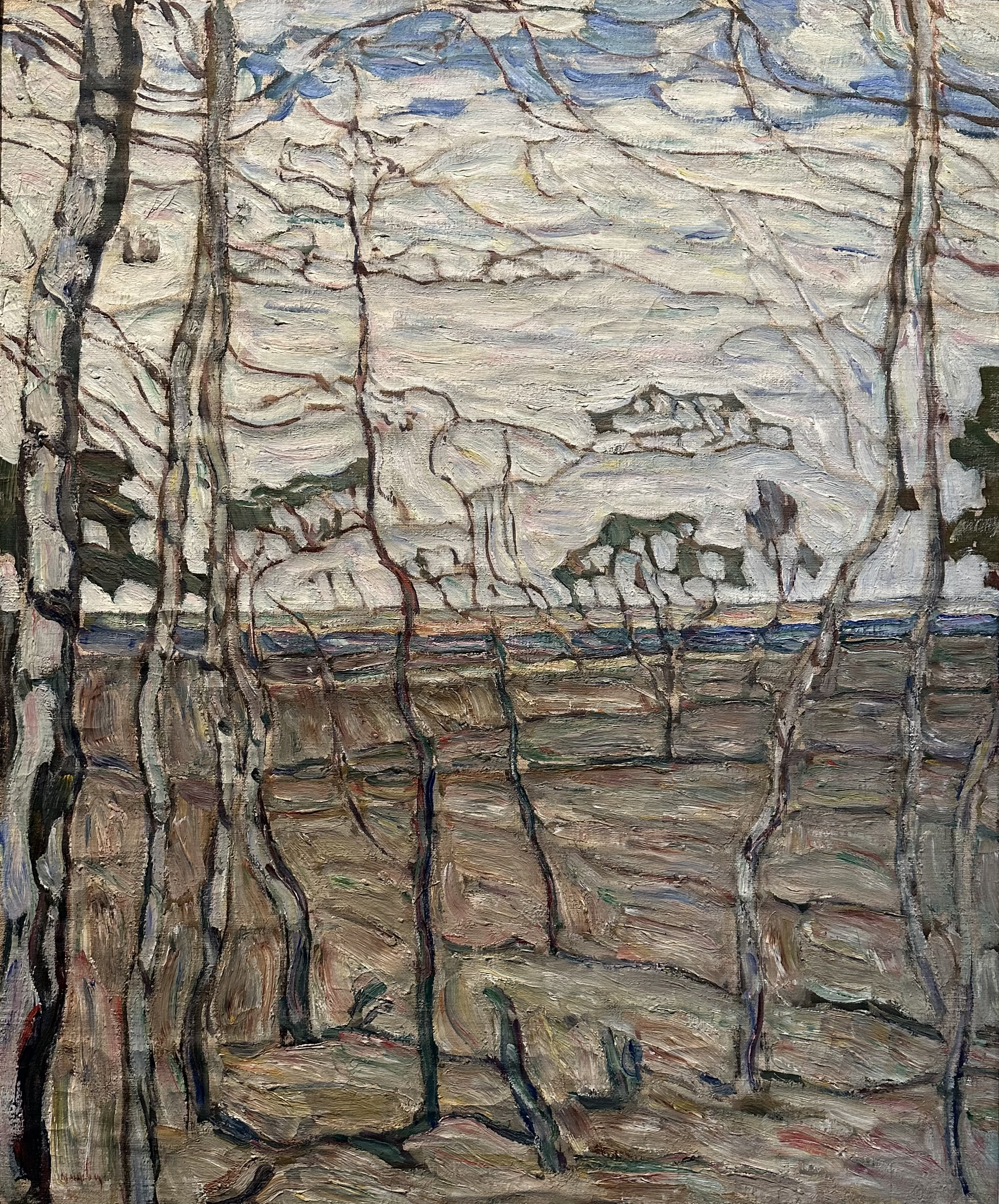
Birch Trees (ca. 1911)

== Sources ==
- Jbankova, O. (2003). Абрам Маневич [Abram Manevich] (PDF). Kiev. ISBN 966-7888-48-7.
