= David Burliuk =

Russian artist, poet and publicist (1882–1967)

- Давид Давидович Бурлюк
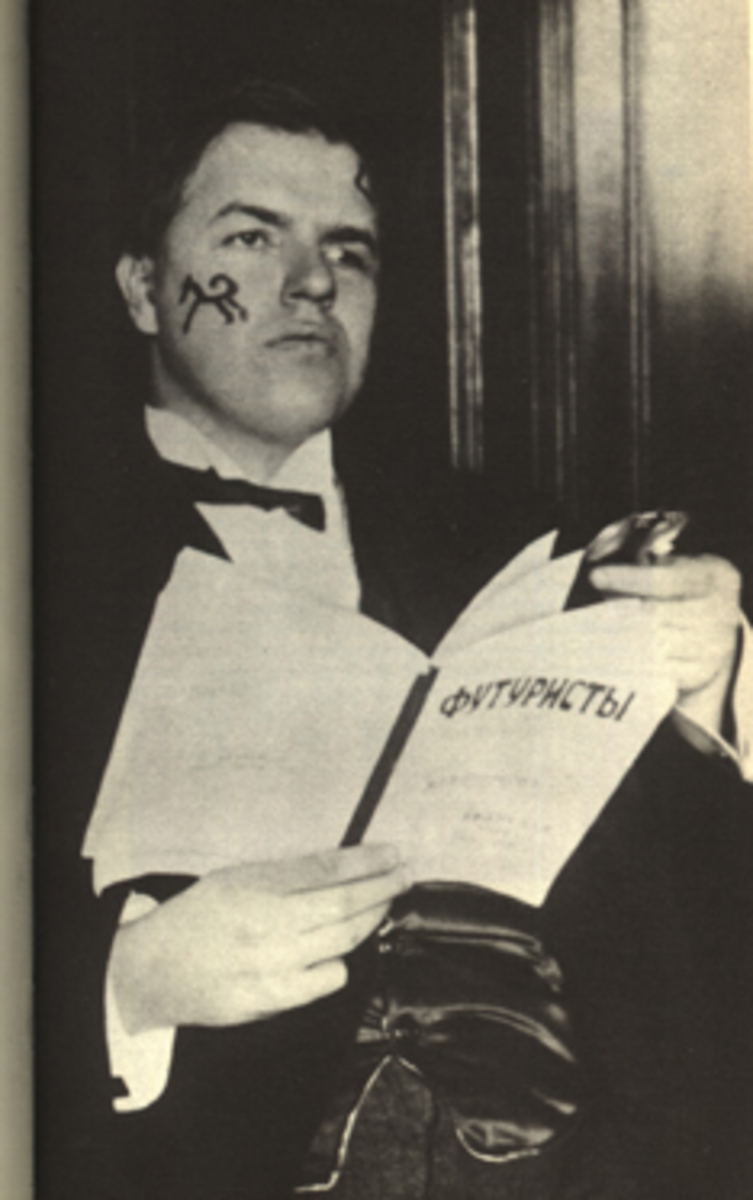
- Burliuk in 1914
- Born: 21 July 1882; Riabushky, Kharkov Governorate, Russian Empire (now in Sumy Oblast, Ukraine)
- Died: 15 January 1967 (aged 84); Southampton, New York, U.S.
- Education: Odessa Art School, Kazan Art School
- Writing career
- Language: Russian
- Movement: Cubo-Futurism

David Davidovich Burliuk (Note: Russian: Давид Давидович Бурлюк; Ukrainian: Давид Давидович Бурлюк, romanized: Davyd Davydovych Burliuk) (21 July [O.S. 9 July] 1882 – 15 January 1967) was a Russian poet, artist and publicist of Ukrainian origin associated with the Futurist and Neo-Primitivist movements. Burliuk has been described as "the father of Russian Futurism."

== Biography ==
=== Early life ===
David Burliuk was born on 21 July 1882 in the village of Riabushky in the Kharkov Governorate of the Russian Empire. Burliuk's family was artistically inclined; two of his brothers were talented artists as well, Nikolai and Vladimir Burliuk. The Burliuk family partly descended from Ukrainian Cossacks on their father's side, who held positions in the Hetmanate. His mother, Ludmyla Mikhnevich, was of ethnic Belarusian descent.

=== Education and career ===
From 1898 to 1904, he studied at Kazan and Odessa art schools, as well as at the Royal Academy in Munich. He studied under Anton Ažbe, who called Burliuk a "wonderful wild steppe horse".

==== Early works ====
In 1907, he made contact with the Russian art world; he met and befriended Mikhail Larionov, and they are both credited as being major forces in bringing together the contemporary art world. In 1908, an exhibition with the group Zveno ("The Link") in Kiev was organized by David Burliuk together with Wladimir Baranoff-Rossine, Alexander Bogomazov, his brother Wladimir Burliuk and Aleksandra Ekster. The exhibition was unsuccessful, especially because they were all unknown painters. The Burliuks and Larionov left for the aforementioned brothers' home in Chernianka, also known as Hylea; it was during this stay that their work became more Avant-Garde. That autumn, while visiting Ekster, they organized an exhibition which took place in the street; it was a success, and enough money was raised to go to Moscow.

In 1909, Burliuk painted a portrait of his future wife, Marussia, on a background of flowers and rocks on the Crimean coast. Many times thereafter he would set the image of his wife to canvas.

The Futurist literary group Gileia was initiated in 1910 by David Burlyuk and his brothers at their aforementioned estate near Kherson, and were quickly joined by Vasily Kamensky and Velimir Khlebnikov, with Aleksey Kruchenykh and Vladimir Mayakovsky joining in 1911. Soon afterwards, the group would morph into literary Cubo-Futurism, the predominant form of Futurism in Russia.

==== Cubo-Futurism ====
Futurist performances allegedly aimed to provoke strong reactions from audiences, sometimes including disruptions and controversy. The artists and poets sometimes wore unconventional clothing and painted their faces, wrote incomprehensible plays, and sometimes provoked the audience over reactions to the poetry. Around 1913, Mayakovsky, Kamensky, and Burliuk embarked on poetry tours, where performances were sometimes met with hostile audience reactions. Russian Futurism would only end after the Revolution of 1917.

Most of the Cubo-Futurists also resisted the Futurists in Italy. A brief alliance with their rivals, the Ego-Futurists, did not end very well. Burliuk's colleague Velimir Khlebnikov also developed Zaum, a poetry style.

==== Additional education ====
From 1910, he was the member of the group Jack of Diamonds, and from 1910 to 1911 he attended the Art School in Odessa. After 1911, David concentrated on poetry and manifestoes, and at Christmas he made the acquaintance of Benedikt Livshits, a poet. From 1911 to 1913, he studied at the Moscow School of Painting, Sculpture and Architecture (MUZHVZ), and that year participated in the group exhibition of the Blaue Reiter in Munich, which also included his brother Wladimir. He also contributed an article to the Blaue Reiter Almanac.

In December 1912, Burliuk was co-author and one of the many signatories of the manifesto A Slap in the Face of Public Taste with the other members of Hylaea, one of the major manifestoes of Russian Futurism, a movement of Russian poets and artists who adopted the principles of Filippo Marinetti's "Futurist Manifesto".

In 1913, he was expelled from the Art Academy, as well as Mayakovsky. In the same year, Burliuk founded the publishing venture of the futurist writer's group Hylaea. In 1914, he and his brother Wladimir illustrated Kamensky's Tango with Cows, and in 1915 Burliuk published the book The Support of the Muses in Spring, with illustrations by Aristarkh Lentulov, and by David and Wladimir Burliuk.

David Burliuk, Revolution, 1917

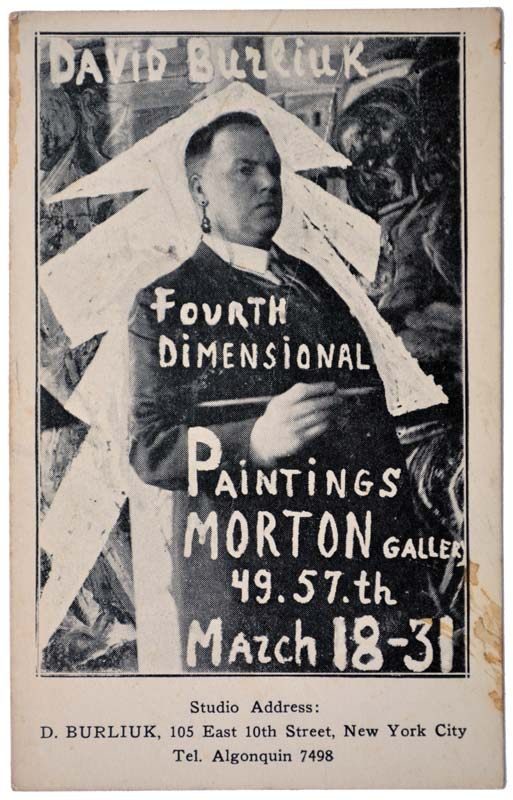
Promotional poster for Burliuk's Four-dimensional Radio-style

From 1915 to 1917, he resided in the Urals with frequent trips to Moscow and Petrograd (St. Petersburg). In 1917, he participated in an exhibition with the group Jack of Diamonds in the artists' salon in Moscow, which included Aleksandra Ekster and Kazimir Malevich.

In 1916, his brother Wladimir was drafted into military service, and in 1917 was killed in World War I in Saloniki. The next year, following the downfall of anarchism (he had befriended anarchists during the time he lived in an abandoned house), Burliuk fled Russia and began his journey to the United States, a process that took him through Siberia, Japan, and Canada which was not complete until 1922. He kept in contact with his fellow Futurists in Russia, and, despite not knowing a word of English, managed to befriend artist and patron Katherine Dreier, establishing himself among the artists of that country. In 1922, he settled in the United States.

In 1924 Burliuk published two Radio-style manifestos detailing a utopian art that would transcend space-time and aid in humanity's pursuit of knowledge and perfection. A colossal sized painting from this period titled Advent of the Mechanical Man, 1925–26, was exhibited in the Brooklyn Museum's 1926 International Exhibition of Modern Art Assembled by Société Anonyme.

In New York, Burliuk developed activity in pro-Soviet oriented groups and, having written a poem for the 10th anniversary of the October Revolution, sought, in particular, to gain recognition as the "father of Russian futurism". He was a regular contributor to the Russian Voice newspaper. Burliuk published his collections, brochures, and magazines together with his wife Maria Nikiforovna, and through friends he distributed these publications mainly within the USSR.

In 1925, Burliuk was a co-founder of the Association of Revolutionary Masters of Ukraine (ARMU) with the members Alexander Bogomazov, Vasiliy Yermilov, Vadym Meller, Alexander Khvostenko-Khvostov, and Palmov Victor. In 1927, he participated in an exhibition of the Latest Artistic Trends in the Russian Museum in Leningrad (St. Petersburg), together with Kazimir Malevich, Aleksandr Shevchenko, and Vladimir Tatlin. Burliuk was author of autobiographical sketches My Ancestors, Forty Years: 1890–1930.

=== Later years ===
In the 1930s, Onya La Tour was an avid collector of modern art who acquired at least one hundred works by Burliuk.

In 1940, Burliuk petitioned the Soviet government for a request to visit his homeland. In exchange, he offered a sizeable collection of archival material pertaining to his contemporary and friend Vladimir Mayakovsky, which Burliuk offered to donate to the Mayakovsky Museum in addition to over 100 original paintings. Burliuk's requests were denied. He was allowed to visit the Soviet Union only in 1956 and 1965.

In 1945, an exhibit was mounted at Irving Place Theater in New York City

In 1962, he and his wife traveled to Australia where he held an exhibition at Moreton Galleries, Brisbane. It was his only Australian exhibition. During his stay there, Burliuk painted some sketches and works with Australian views. From 1937 to 1966, Burliuk and his wife, Marusia, published Color & Rhyme, a journal primarily concerned with charting Burliuk's activities.

Burliuk lived in Hampton Bays on Long Island for approximately 20 years until he died at Southampton Hospital in Southampton, New York. His house and studio still remain.

== Legacy ==
In Russian poetry, Burliuk is regarded as a trailblazer. In 1990, the Russian Academy of Futurist Poetry established the David Burliuk Prize (Otmetina) for experimental poetry awarded annually.

Burliuk's cultural identity has grown as a source of debate among historians and scholars since Ukrainian Independence. Scholars agree that he established Futurism within the Russian Empire but debate if he should be considered a Ukrainian or Russian poet and artist or a "Russian who was proud of his Ukrainian origins". Some scholars have sought to re-appropriate Burliuk as a Ukrainian artist given his use of the Ukrainian steppes in his paintings, a testimony from his son, and his choice of color palettes. Other literary critics argue Burliuk's involvement in Soviet publications and groups in New York suggest a more Russian identity as Burliuk tried to establish his role in Futurism.

== Other appearances ==
- Burliuk appears in Part III of the Vladimir Mayakovsky's landmark poem A Cloud in Trousers (A Cloud in Pants, 1915).
- A painting (most likely fictional) by Burliuk appears in the novel Chapayev and Void by Viktor Pelevin. The painting is described as a black writing though a stencil of the word GOD.

== Gallery ==
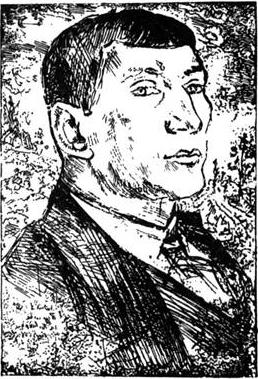
Benedict Livshits (1911)

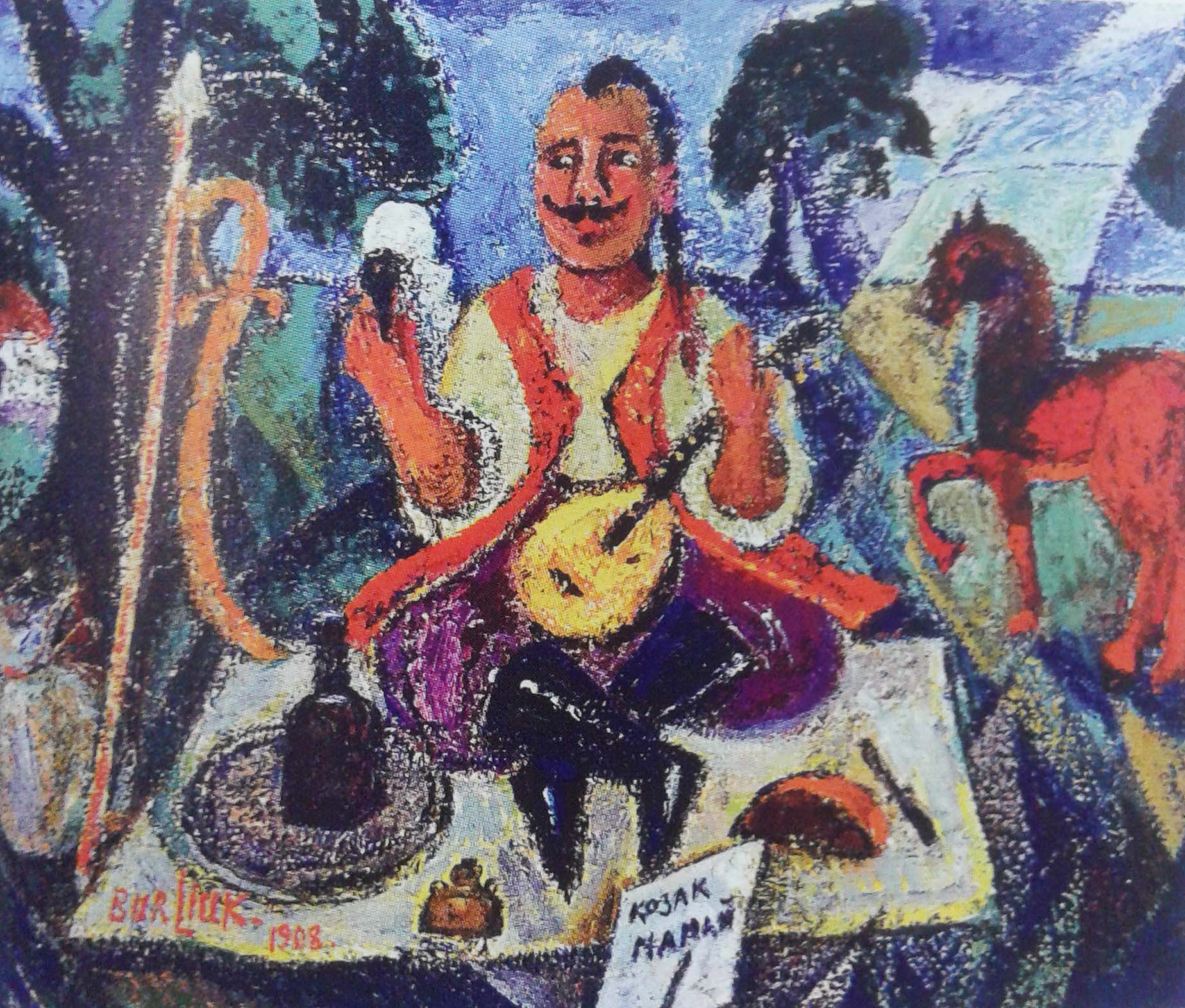
My Cossack Ancestor (1912)

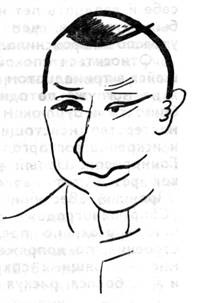
Vladimir Burliuk (1913)

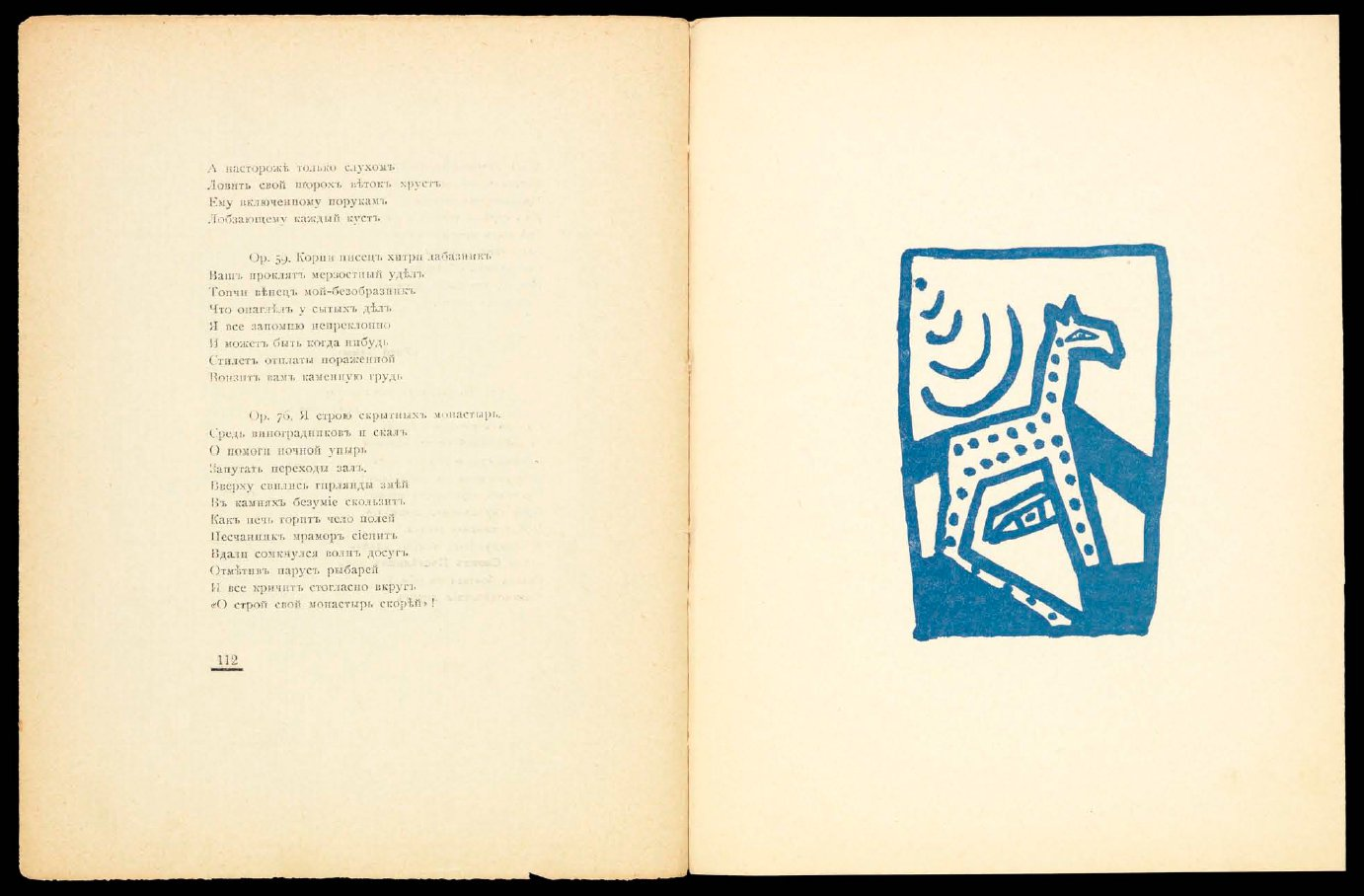
2-page spread from Dokhlaya Luna (1913)

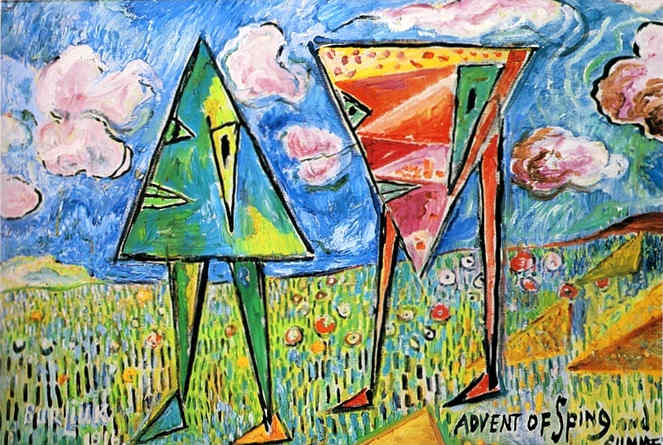
Spring (1914)

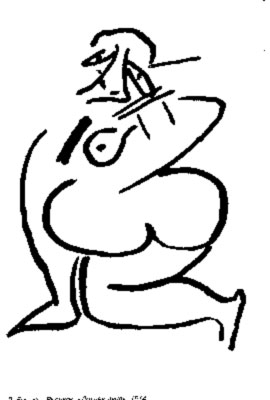
Dokhlaya Luna (1914)

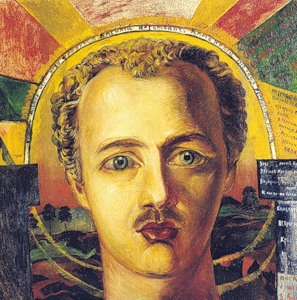
Portrait of Vasily Kamensky (1917)

== Publishing history ==
- 1912: co-author of the Russian Futurist manifesto A Slap in the Face of Public Taste.
- 1915: The Support of the Muses in Spring
