= Vasyl Yermylov =

Ukrainian Soviet artist

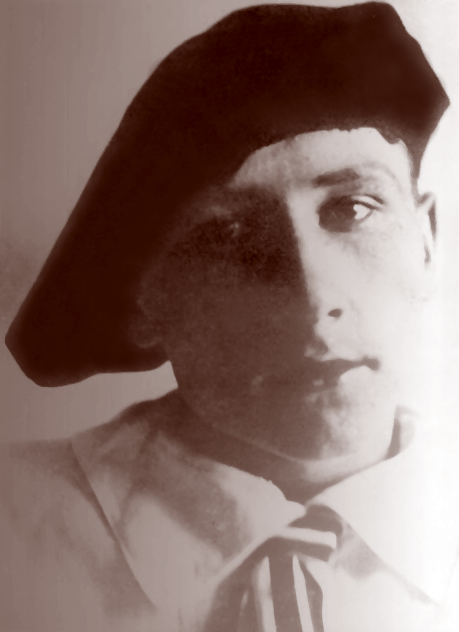
- Born: Василь Дмитрович Єрмилов; 22 March 1894; Kharkiv, Russian Empire
- Died: 6 January 1968 (aged 73); Kharkiv, Ukrainian SSR
- Known for: painting, graphics
- Movement: Avant-garde

Vasyl Dmytrovych Yermylov (Ukrainian: Василь Дмитрович Єрмилов, 22 March 1894 – 6 January 1968) was a Ukrainian painter, avant-garde artist and designer. His genres included cubism, constructivism, and neo-primitivism. Yermylov was one of the founders on avantgarde in Ukraine.

== Biography ==
Vasyl Yermylov was born on 22 March 1894 in the city of Kharkiv, the Russian Empire, now Ukraine. In 1910 he studied at the School for Applied Art in Kharkiv, and had lessons in the studio of Eduard Steinberg, having an interest in fresco painting and mosaic work. From 1911 to 1912 he was a member of the Golubaya Liliya (Blue Lily) in Kharkiv. Then he moved to Moscow to continue his studies.

In Moscow, Yermylov attended the Moscow School of Painting, Sculpture and Architecture in 1912. In the same year he met Vladimir Mayakovsky and David Burliuk. In 1913, he attended the studios of Ilya Mashkov and Pyotr Konchalovsky in Moscow for training.

Subsequently, Yermylov returned to Kharkiv where in 1913–1914 he was a member of the group Budiak (Weed). In 1914, he resumed his studies at the School for Applied Art in Kharkiv and graduated with a Diploma in Decorative Painting. In 1918, Yermylov founded the group League of Seven, together with the artist Maria Siniakova, and exhibited with the group in the same year. In 1919, he furthermore founded the Industrial Teacher Workshop, also in Kharkiv.

- In 1920, Yermylov became head of the Ukrainian Telegraph Agency for Propaganda Purpose (UKROSTA) project and decorator for the agitprop movement Red Ukraine and the Club of the Red Army (Kharkiv).

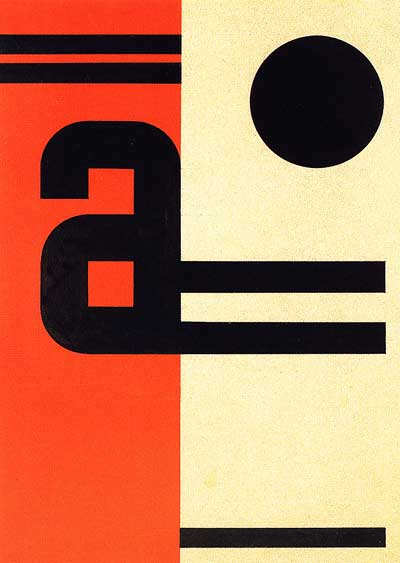
Cover of the magazine "Avantgarde", 1929

- In 1922, he was a co-founder of the Technical Art Institute in Kharkiv.
- In 1925, Vasyl Yermylov became a member of the Association of Revolutionary Art of Ukraine (ARMU), together with Vadym Meller, Alexander Bogomazov, Victor Palmov and others.
- In 1928, Yermylov participated in the International Press Exhibition Pressa, Cologne, together with El Lissitzky, Vadym Meller and Aleksandr Tyshler.
- In 1928–1929, he was the artistic director of the magazine Avantgarde, and also made designs for book covers, illustrations for Ukrainian magazines, and designs for interiors.
- From 1944 to 1947, he was a teacher at the National Art Institute in Kharkiv.
- From 1963 to 1967, Yermylov continued to teach at the National Art Institute (Kharkiv).
- Vasyl Yermylov died on 6 January 1968 in Kharkiv.

Other sources have his date of death as 7 January 1968.

== Influence ==
On March 22, 2012, the first center of modern art, named "Yermilov Center", opened in Kharkiv.

In 2018, Ukrainian creative agency Banda created the Yermylov Bold typeface, which was used specifically in the Ukraine NOW brand. The author of the typeface was inspired by the works of Ukrainian constructivist artist Vasyl Yermylov.

== Selected works ==
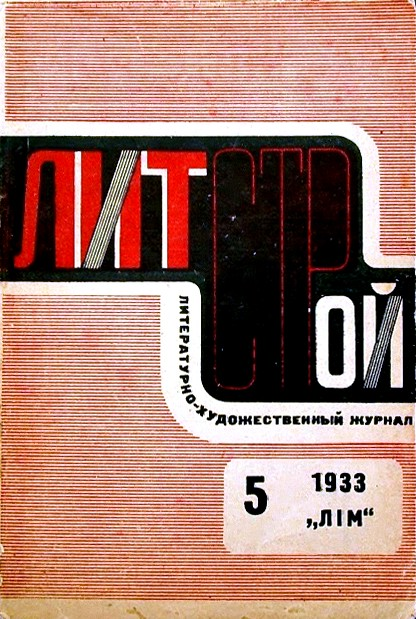
Cover of "Litstroy", a literary art magazine by Yermylov, 1933

- posters and decoration for May Day 1919–1920
- design for the Red Ukraine agit-train 1921
- worked on the design of the Ukrainian stand at the World Exhibition of Graphic Art (Cologne) 1928
- Interior design of Pioneers Palace, Kharkiv 1933–1934
- Interior design of Defence Building, Kyiv 1935–1936

== Exhibitions ==
- 2012, Vasyl Yermylov. 1894–1968 , Multimedia Art Museum, Moscow

== See also ==
- Yermilov Centre

== Bibliography ==
- Short biography in English
- “Єрмилов Василь Дмитрович” (Short biography in Ukrainian)
