= Anatol Petrytsky =

Soviet Ukrainian painter (1895–1964)

- Анатоль Петрицький
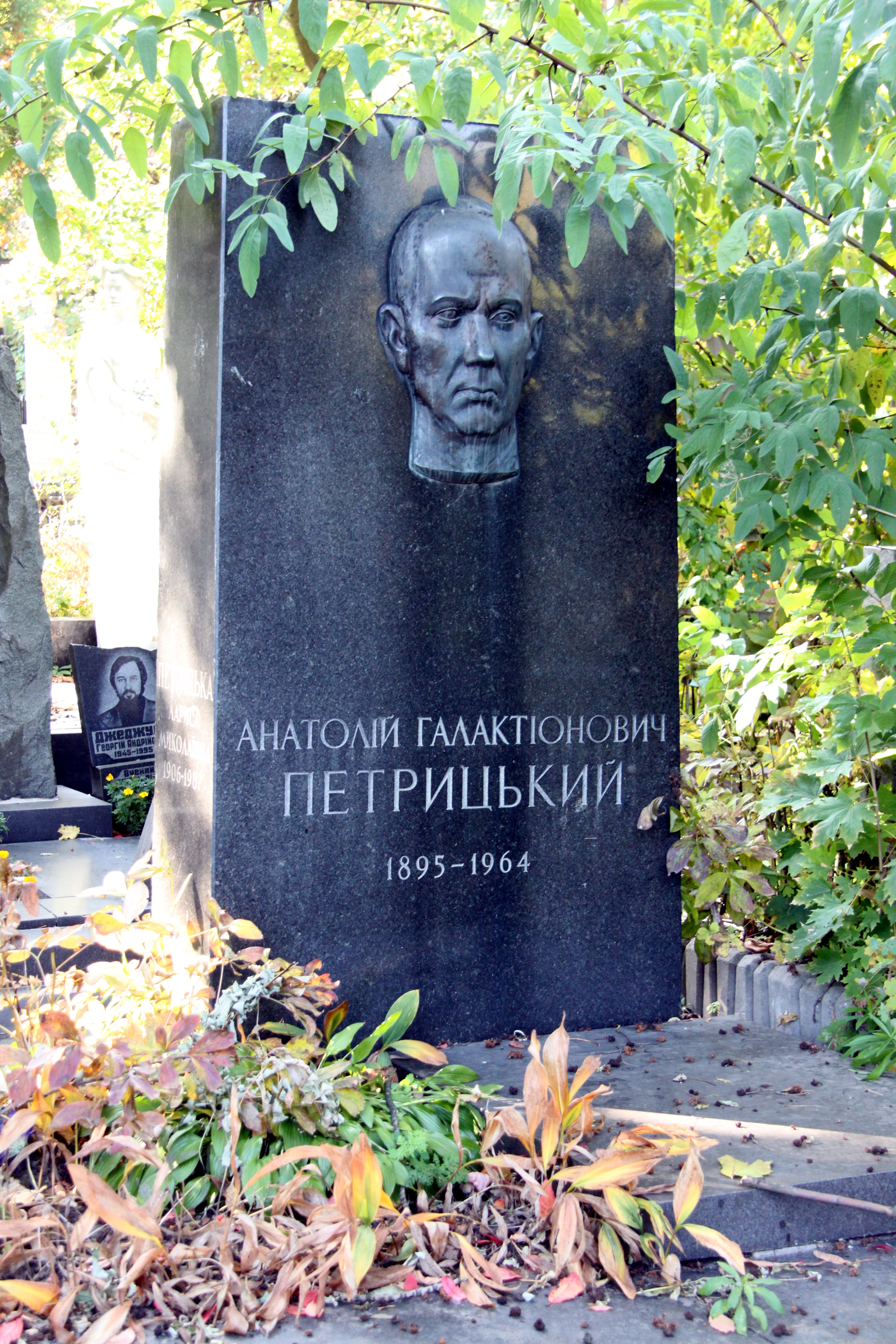
- Petrytsky's grave in Baikove Cemetery
- Born: 12 February 1895; Kyiv, Russian Empire
- Died: 6 March 1964 (aged 69); Kyiv, Ukrainian SSR, Soviet Union
- Style: Cubism; Futurism; Landscape painting

Anatolii Halaktionovych Petrytskyi (Ukrainian: Анато́лій Галактіо́нович Петри́цький; 12 February [O.S. 31 January] 1895 – 6 March 1964), better known as Anatol Petrytskyi was a Ukrainian and Soviet painter and designer.

== Biography ==
Petrytsky was born in the family of a railwayman. Due to his father's paralytic illness, the family had to settle in a colony for disabled people in Poltava Oblast, where Anatol spent his childhood. Later, he was sent to an orphanage in Kyiv. Living in the city, Anatol was able to visit Kyiv Opera, and soon started creating amateur plays together with other orphans. Having noticed his talent, Petrytskyi's tutors financed his artistic education. From 1912 to 1918, he studied at the Kyiv Art School During his studies, Petrytskyi travelled to Saint Petersburg and Moscow, visiting the Hermitage Museum and Tretyakov Gallery.

In his youth, Petrytskyi was particularly inspired by the works of Titian and colour schemes of the Impressionists. Already as a student, he was prone to experimenting. His works were highly evaluated by Fedir Krychevsky, who introduced Petrytskyi to his brother, renowned architect and graphic designer Vasyl Krychevsky, who provided him access to his collection of Ukrainian folk art. He also attended the studio of Oleksandr Murashko.

In 1916, Petrytskyi debuted as a stage designer. In 1917-1920 he served as chief artist of Les Kurbas' Young Theatre, completing the majority of its theatrical performances, including "Autumn", "Candida", "Flooded Bell" and "Christmas Vertep". A major inspiration for Petrytskyi during that period were the works by Aleksandra Ekster, who in 1918 opened her studio in Kyiv. Petrytsky was the main artist of the First State Drama Theater of the Ukrainian SSR and the Ukrainian Musical Drama in Kyiv, and also designed books and magazines. He joined the literary associations White Studio (1918) and Flamingo (1919).

In 1922 Petrytskyi left Kyiv for Moscow and enrolled at Vkhutemas, where he studied as an apprentice of Aleksandr Drevin and Nadezhda Udaltsova. In Moscow Petrytskyi also met his wife Larysa. In 1924 most works created by Petrytskyi during his Moscow period were destroyed by a fire in his house; earlier in 1918 his early works had been destroyed during the shelling of Kyiv by the army of Muravyov.

In 1925 Petrytskyi returned to Ukraine and settled in Kharkiv together with his wife. During that period he cooperated with Hnat Yura, director of Ivan Franko Theatre. Petrytskyis' flat became a meeting place for Kharkiv's theatrical and literary circles. Depite his busy schedule at the theatre, in Kharkiv Petrytskyi also created new works of fine art, including numerous portraits.

In 1927 Petrytskyi became a cofounder of the futuristic organization "New Generation" along with Geo Shkurupiy, Dmytro Buzko, Leonid Skrypnyk, Oleksiy Poltoratsky, Oleksii Vlyzko and Vadym Meller. His works were reprinted in several art magazines. In 1930 Petrytskyi and his wife settled in the Slovo Building.

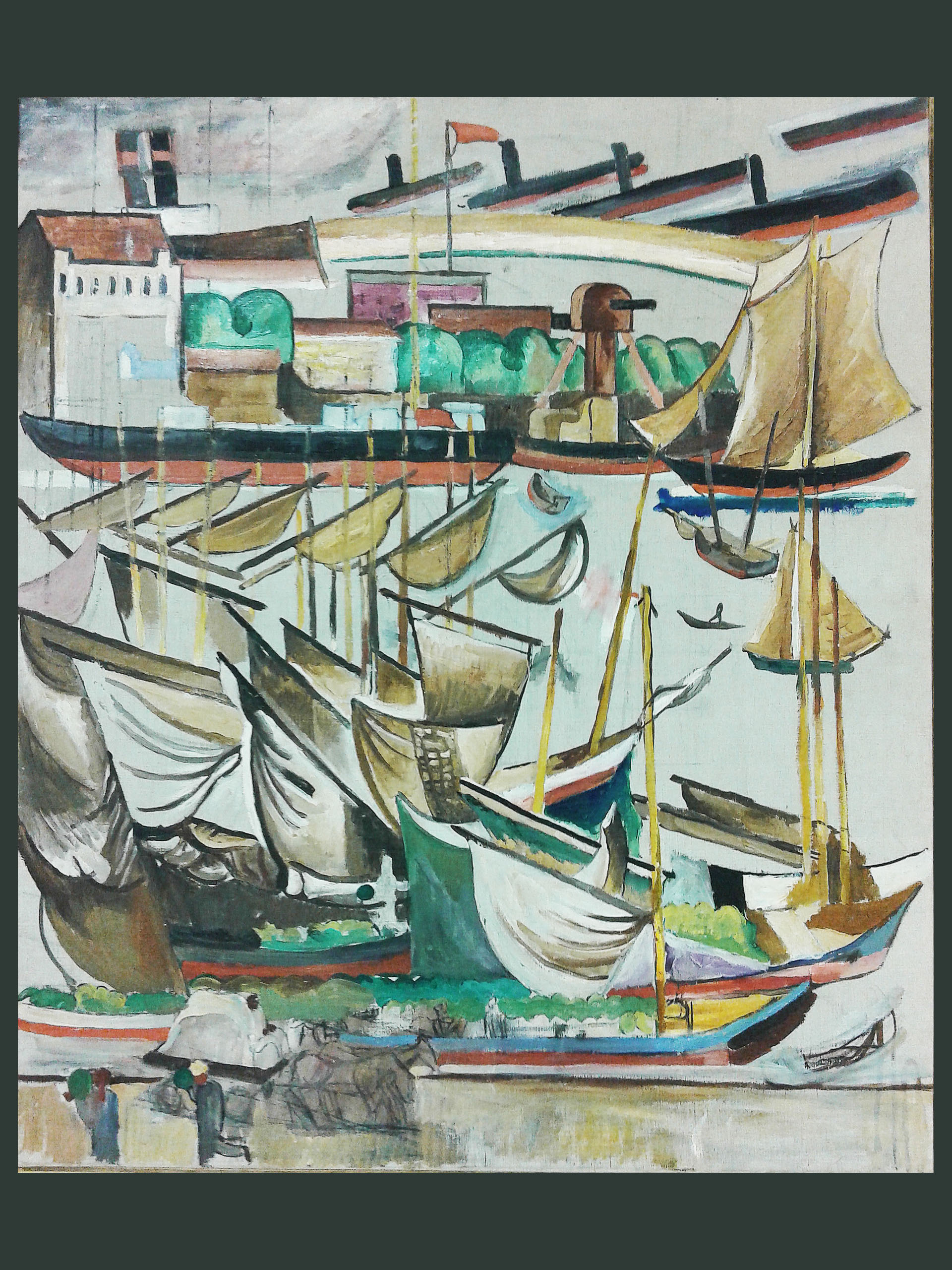
Haven by Anatol Petrytsky, 1930-1931

Petrytsky's painting "Disabled" was presented at the Venice Biennale of 1930, received a high grade, and then traveled to America for several years as part of an exhibition of paintings, many of which were mentioned by the European press.

Starting from the mid-1930s, Petrytskyi was forced to justify his "formalism" before the increasingly totalitarian Soviet regime. For instance, while recognizing the high artistic level of Pablo Picasso's works, he called them "alien" in the class sense. Despite his earlier participation in the modernist and avantgarde movements, Petrytskyi continued to be valued by the government, receiving the title of People's Artist of USSR in 1944 and two Stalin Prizes in 1949 and 1951. During the Second World War he received permission from Nikita Khrushchev to join the Red Army in order to create sketches for a future monumental painting dedicated to the Battle of Kursk.

Petrytsky died on 6 March 1964, and was buried in Baikove Cemetery in Kyiv. His bronze tombstone was created by sculptor Halyna Kalchenko, and installed in 1970.

More than 500 of Petrytsky's works of stage design belong to the collection of the Museum of Theatre, Music and Cinema of Ukraine. Additionally, some of his works are kept at the National Art Museum of Ukraine.
