= Vadym Meller =

Ukrainian Soviet painter

- Sketch of decor for Hello, on the wave 477 (1929)
- Born: Вадим Георгійович Меллер; 26 April 1884; Saint Petersburg
- Died: 4 May 1962 (aged 78); Kyiv
- Education: Kyiv University
- Known for: Painter, theatrical designer, book illustrator, and architect
- Movement: Constructivism, Cubism, Expressionism
- Awards: Gold Medal: International Exhibition of Modern Decorative and Industrial Arts, Paris, for scenic design at the Berezil Theatre, 1925

Vadym Heorhiiovych Meller (Ukrainian: Вадим Георгійович Меллер) (1884 – 1962) was a Ukrainian and Soviet artist, known for his Avant-Garde Cubist, Constructivist, and Expressionist approach to painting, and his other creative work as a theatrical designer, book illustrator, and architect. In 1925, he was awarded a gold medal for the scenic design of the Berezil Theatre in the International Exhibition of Modern Decorative and Industrial Arts (Art Deco) in Paris.

== Career ==
From 1903 to 1908, Meller studied at Kyiv University. In 1905, he visited Geneva, Switzerland, where he took art lessons at the private school of Franz Roubaud. In 1908, on the recommendation of Roubaud, he continued his education at the private art school of drawing and painting of Heinrich Knirr in Munich, Germany. There, Meller met fellow student, Paul Klee, who introduced him to Der Blaue Reiter group.

After graduating from Kyiv University with a degree in law, he acquired an artistic education in the Munich Academy of Fine Arts from 1908–1912. Meller stayed in close contact with Der Blaue Reiter group. During this time, he also met Wassily Kandinsky, with whom he became friends.

Meller first started to exhibit his art after moving to Paris, where he joined the Société des Artistes Indépendants. At the same time he was a student of Antoine Bourdelle. In 1912–1914, together with Kazimir Malevich, Sonia Delaunay, Alexander Archipenko, and Aleksandra Ekster, he participated in a number of exhibitions (Salon des Indépendants, Spring Salon, and Salon D' Automne) alongside Pablo Picasso, Georges Braque, and André Derain.

After returning to Kyiv in 1915, he worked at easel and monumental painting, graphic design, and costume design. His transition to scenography as his main field of artistic activity took place in the post-revolutionary years. From 1918–1921, he worked with scenographer and dancer Bronislava Nijinska (Vaslav Nijinsky's sister) in her ballet studio. At the end of this period he became a professor in the National Academy of Fine Arts and Architecture. In 1922, Les Kurbas invited Meller to the recently founded Berezil Theatre.

In 1925, Meller, together with Sonia Terk, Alexandra Exter, and Nathan Altman, participated in Exposition Internationale des Modernes (Art Deco) in Paris.There, Meller was awarded a gold medal for his scenic design of the Berezil' theater. That same year, Meller participated in the International Theater Exposition in New York.

Meller became the leader of the Constructivist movement in Ukrainian theater design. He worked in the National theater as a chief artist until 1945. From 1925 onward, he also taught at the Kyiv Art Institute (KKHI) together with Vladimir Tatlin and Alexander Bogomazov. Also in 1925, Meller became a member of the artists union Association of the Revolutionary Masters of Ukraine together with David Burliuk (co-founder), Alexander Bogomazov (co-founder), Vasyl Yermylov, Victor Palmov, and Alexander Khvostenko-Khvostov.

In 1928, he participated in the International Press Exhibition Pressa Cologne, together with El Lissitzky, Aleksandr Tyshler and Vasyl Yermylov.

== Related work ==
Meller worked as an acting director of the Monumental Painting and Sculpture Institute of the Academy of Architecture of the Ukrainian SSR (1946–1948), a chief artist of the Kyiv Music Comedy Theater (1948–1953), and a chief artist of the Iv. Franko Kyiv Academic Theater (1953–1959).

== Personal ==
Born in Saint Petersburg, Meller was the second son of a top official in the Ministry of Justice in the Russian Empire. His father, Heorhiy Meller, was a noble-born Swede; his mother, Helena Caruso, was half Italian and half Greek, and also from a noble family Meller married Nina Genke, a fellow avant-garde artist. He died in Kyiv in May 4, 1962..Daughter Brigitta Vetrova (1930-2020) was the prominent Ukrainian journalist, art critic, best known for her work during the 1970s and 1980s. She played a vital role in preserving the historical legacy of her parents Vadym Meller and Nina Henke-Meller.
