= Kyiv Art School =

Former art school in Kiev

Kyiv Art School (Ukrainian: Київське художнє училище, romanized: Kyivske khudozhnie uchylyshche) was a secondary educational institution in Kiev between 1900 and 1920.

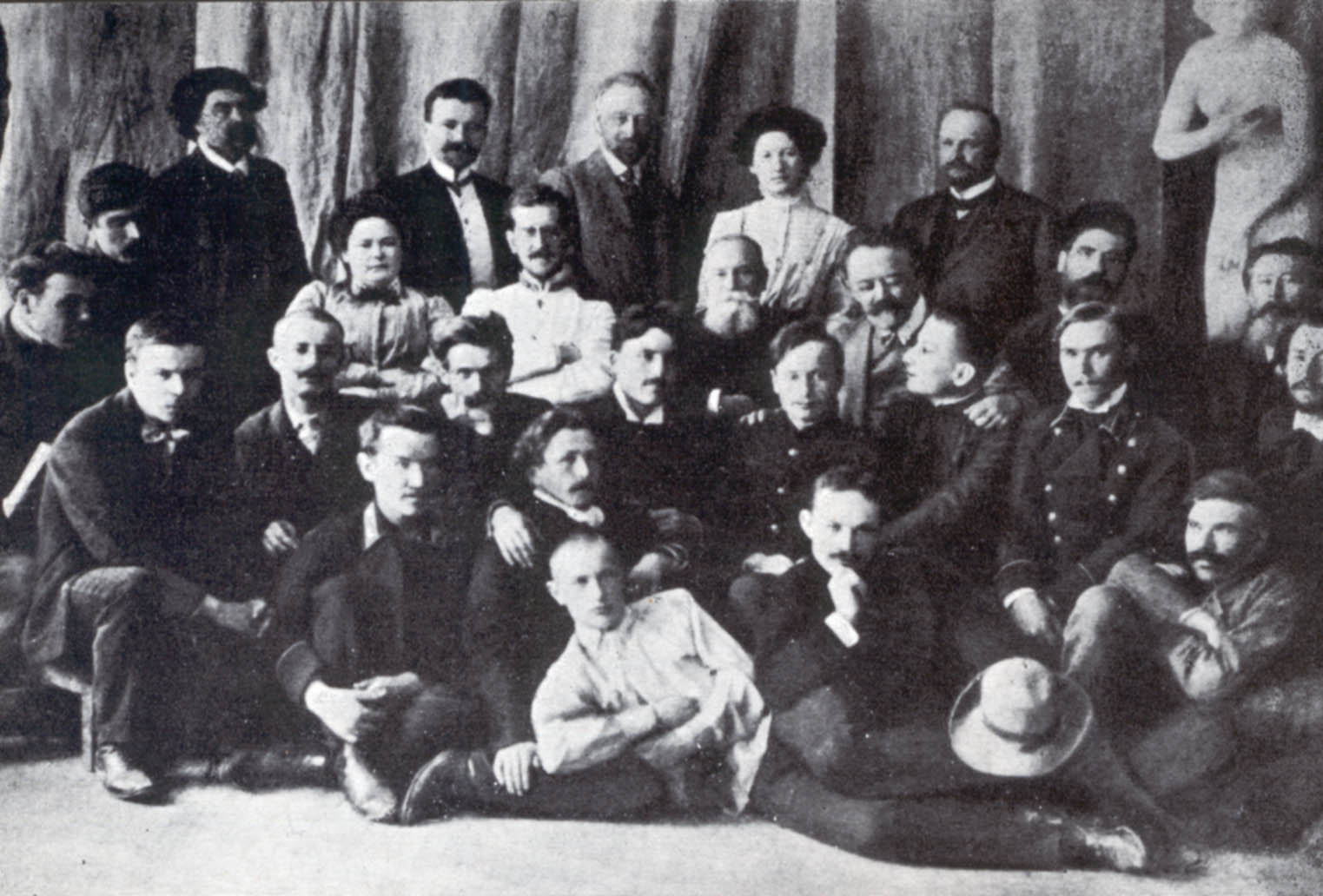
Teachers and students of the Kyiv Art School (1908). Standing from left to right: F. Balavenskyi, I. Makushenko, V. Menk, O. Natanson, I. Nikolaiev, sitting in the third row are L. Dorodnitsyna (supervisor), B. Ikonnykov, V. Nikolaiev, I. Seleznov, G. Diadchenko, V. Manastyrskyi (manager), among the students in the second row, second from the left, K. Trokhymenko.

It offered painting, drawing, and sketching classes. In 1901 it established a regular program of classes, with departments in architecture and painting. Enrolment surpassed 500 by 1902, including students from the Kyiv Drawing School.

Director until 1911 was Vladimir Nikolaiev. Other organizers included Volodymyr Menk, Volodymyr Orlovsky, Mykola Pymonenko, Khariton Platonov, and Ivan Seleznov. Faculty included Fedir Balavensky, Mykhailo Boichuk, Hryhorii Diadchenko, Mykhailo Kozyk, Fotii Krasytskyi, Fedir Krychevsky, and Oleksandr Murashko.

Prominent alumni included Alexander Archipenko, Oleksandr Bohomazov, Aleksandra Ekster, Ivan Kavaleridze, Oleksandr (Les) Lozovsky, Ivan Padalka, Abram Manevich, Anatol Petrytsky, and Vasyl Sedliar.

== Sources ==
- "Kyiv Art School". Internet Encyclopedia of Ukraine.
