= Khariton Platonov =

Russian painter (1842–1907)

- Харитон Платонов
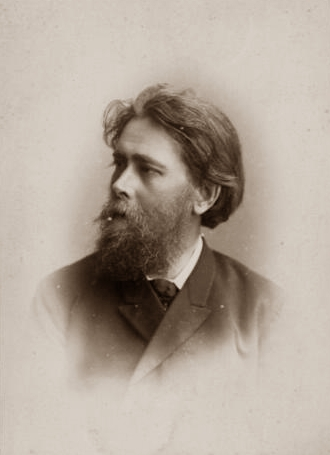
- Born: 1842; Yaroslavl Governorate
- Died: September 18, 1907 (aged 64–65); Kiev
- Education: Member Academy of Arts (1893)
- Alma mater: Imperial Academy of Arts (1870)
- Known for: Painting
- Style: Academism
- Movement: Peredvizhniki

Khariton Platonovich Platonov (Russian: Харитон Платонович Платонов; 1842 – 18 September 1907) was a Russian genre painter and art professor who spent most of his career in Kiev. A majority of his works feature young women as their subjects.

== Biography ==
He was born to a peasant family. From 1859 to 1870, he attended the Imperial Academy of Arts where he was awarded silver medals for "success in drawing" in 1862, 1863 and 1867. Upon graduating, he was given the title of "Artist", third degree, and became a lecturer at a district school in Tsarskoye Selo. After presenting two works at the Academy's exhibition in 1872, he was promoted to Artist, second degree.

In 1878, for his painting "Bulgarian Boy", he received a gold medal from the Academy's council. In 1883, he became an Artist of the first degree and, in 1893 was named an "Academician". In 1889, his painting "The Little Jewish Girl" was purchased by Finance Minister Ivan Vyshnegradsky

After 1877, he was a resident of Kiev, where he taught at the Kiev Drawing School; founded in 1875 by Nikolay Murashko. From 1884 to 1889, he worked on the mural restoration project at St. Cyril's Church, under the direction of Mikhail Vrubel. In 1901, he helped reorganize the drawing school and broaden its curriculum to become the "Kiev Art School". Among his most prominent students were Mykola Pymonenko, Mykola Burachek and Mykhailo Zhuk.

He had major showings at the 31st and 32nd exhibitions of the Peredvizhniki and exhibited widely throughout Russia.

== Works ==
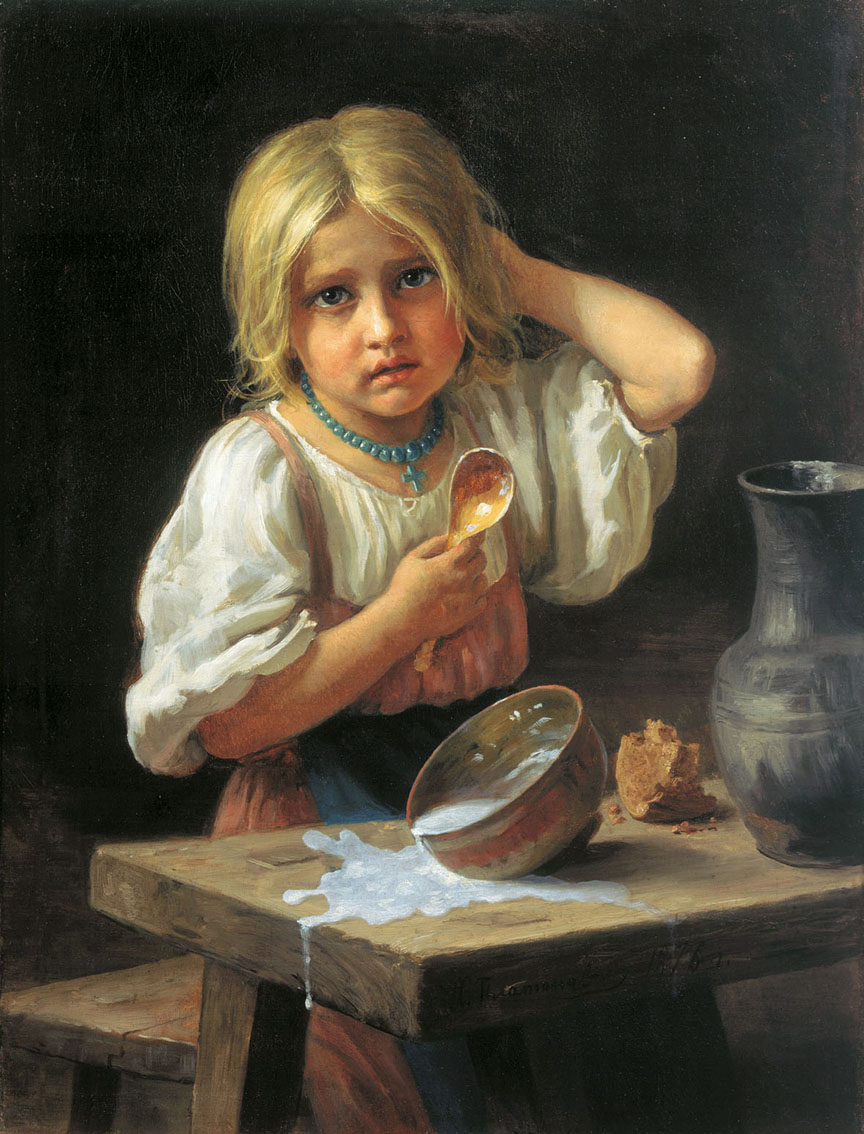
Spilled milk (1876)

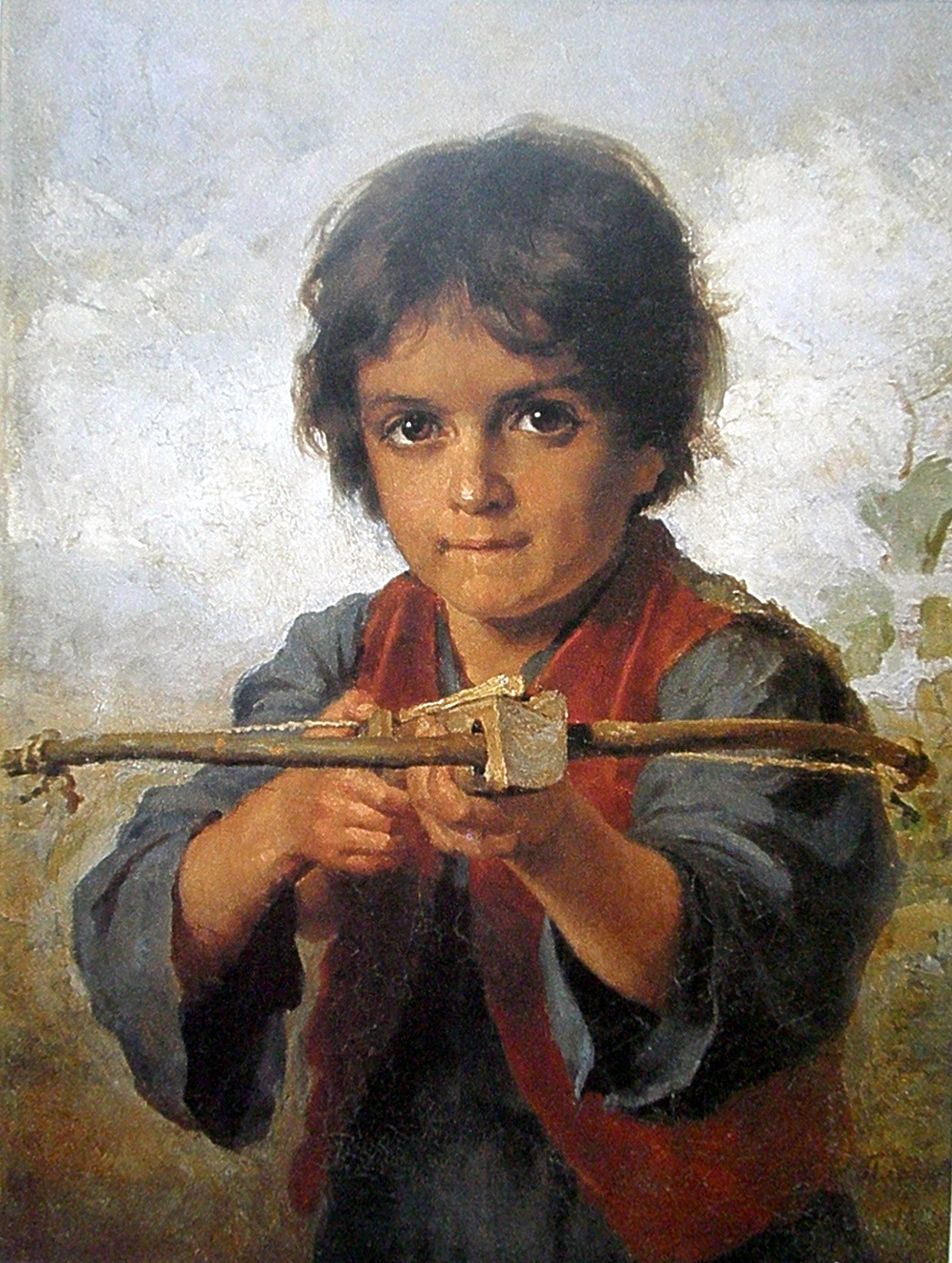
Boy shooting a bow (1878)

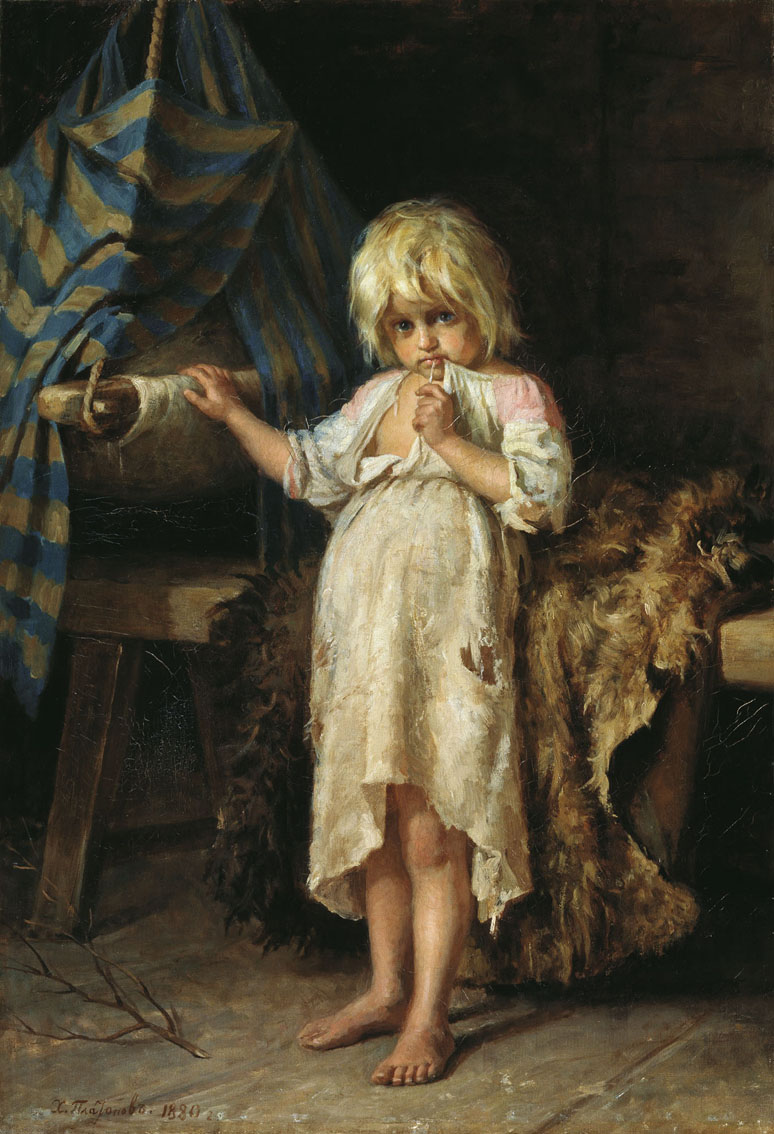
The little baby-sitter (1880)

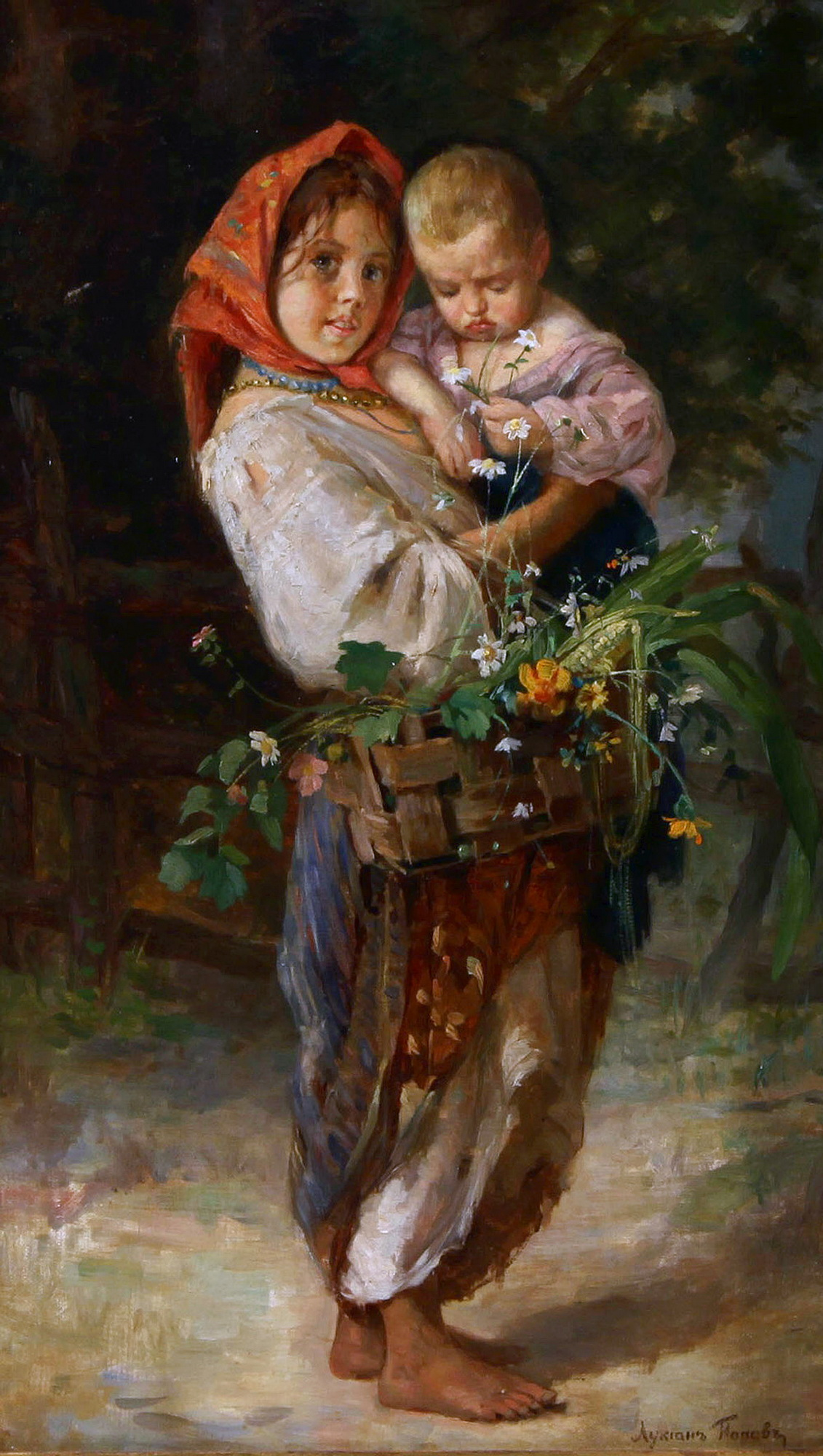
Naymichka (1886)

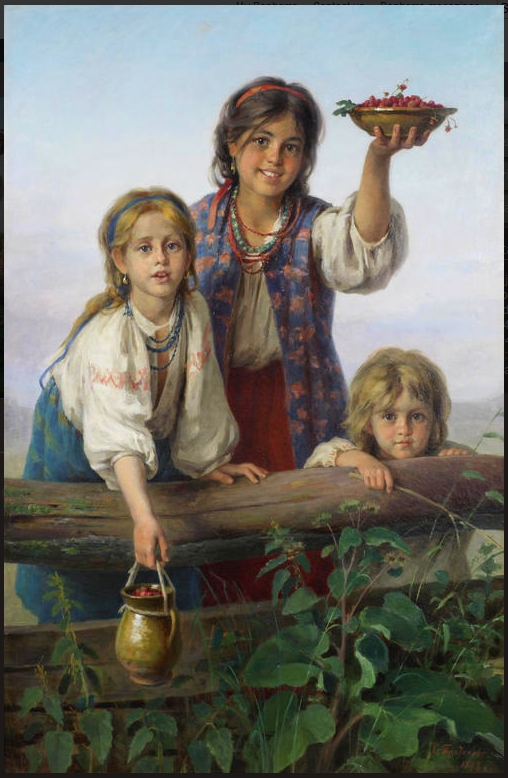
Berry sellers (1888)

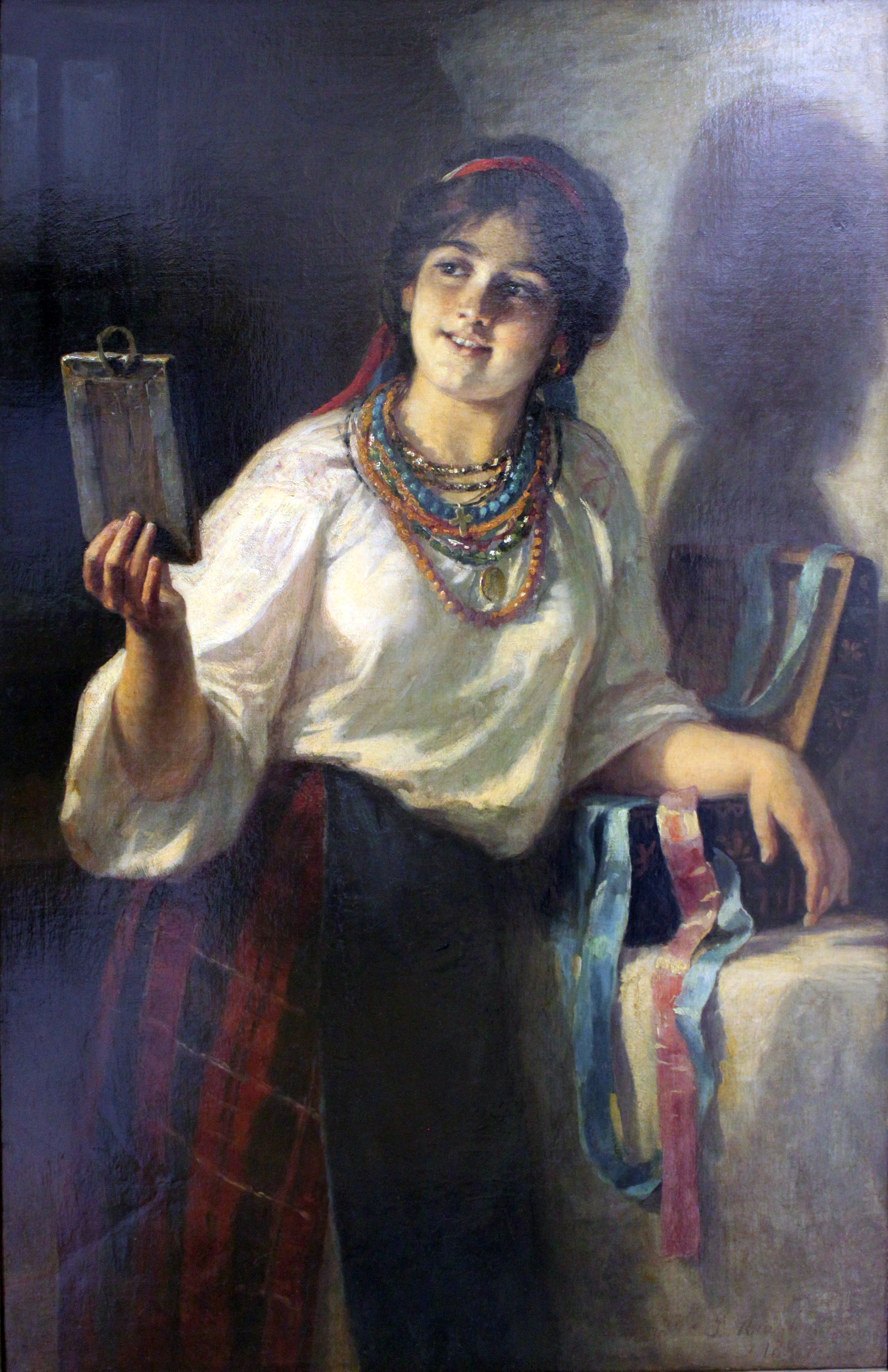
Oksana (1888)
