= Inna Bychenkova =

Ukrainian theater and film artist (1941–2023)

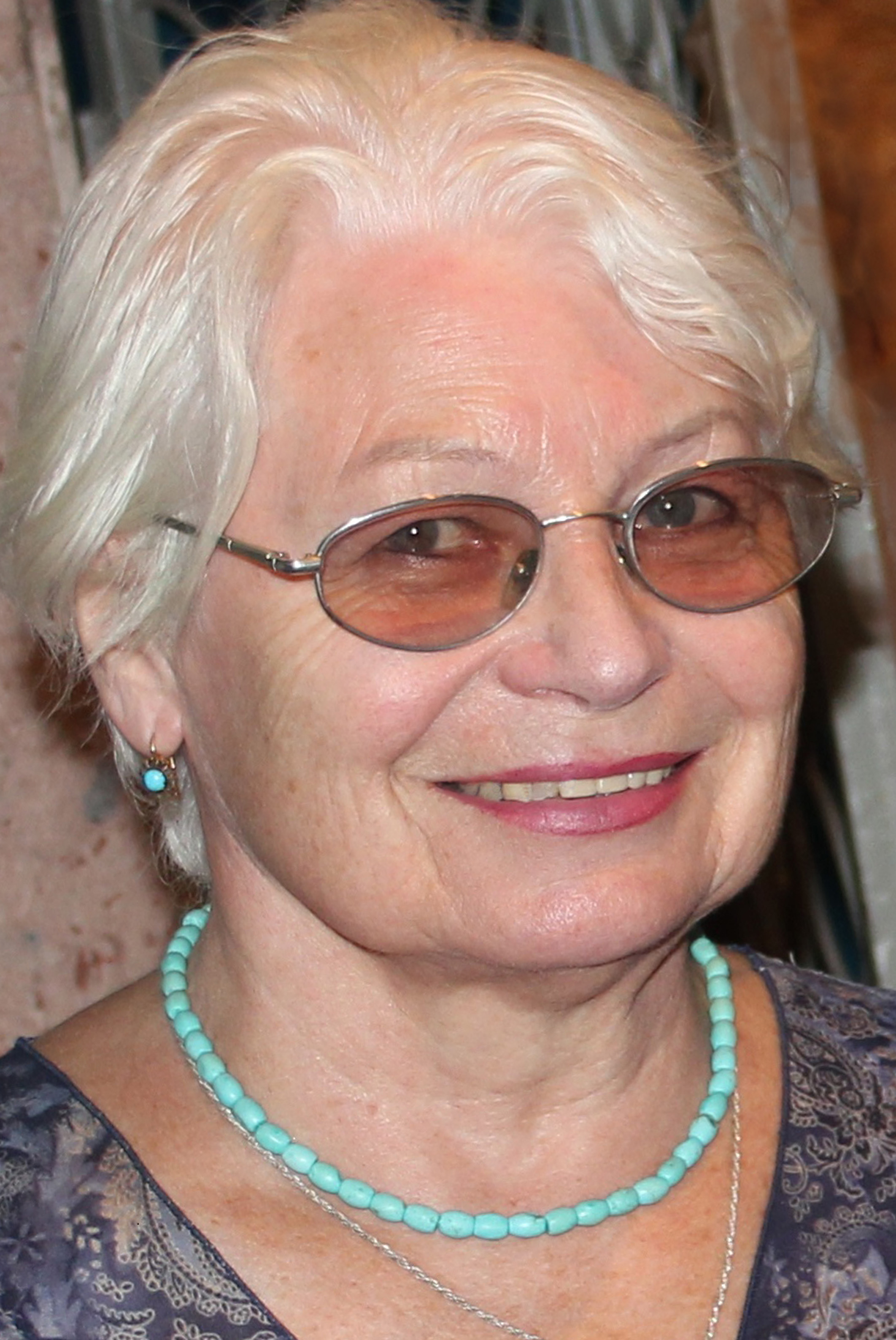

Inna Valentynivna Bychenkova (Ukrainian: Биченкова Інна Валентинівна; 5 June 1941 – 16 January 2023) was a Soviet and Ukrainian theater and film artist and teacher. Honored Artist of Ukraine (2003).

== Early life and education ==
Inna Bychenkova graduated from the Kyiv State Art Institute (1967, workshop of Mykola Dukhnovsky).

== Career ==
Bychenkova worked in the field of painting, scenography, and cinema. Among her principal works are: Theatrical still lifes (1979–82), Birth of an Image (1979), Illusion (1981), Every Evening (1982); series – Provincial Life (1980–83), Autumn Motifs (1995–96), Dreamy Still Lifes (1996–98), Unforgettable Past (1999).

Bychenkova staged more than sixty performances in various theaters in Kyiv and other cities in Ukraine. She worked as an associate professor and teacher at the Art Institute and participated in the creation of several dozen films and television series.

Bychenkova was a member of the National Union of Theater Actors of Ukraine (1971), the National Union of Artists of Ukraine (1976), and the Ukrainian Association of Cinematographers (1989).

The film Raspad (1990), in which Bychenkova was a Production Designer, about the accident at the Chornobyl nuclear power plant and its consequences, received two film awards: the gold medal at the IFF in Venice and the grand prix at the IFF of environmental film and television films in Santander (Spain).

== Style ==
Bychenkova reproduced the beauty of the environment on complex canvases, combining painting and theatrical principles. Bychenkova's paintings, which she generously shared with friends, and demonstrated at annual exhibitions, are characterized by exceptional lyricism, and a profound experience of the existential nature of being.

== Personal life ==
Bychenkova's daughter Yulia, son-in-law, and grandson Platon also devoted themselves to art, working as graphic artists and living in the USA.

== Selected filmography ==
=== As a Costume Designer ===
- 1984 – Two Hussars (directed by Viacheslav Kryshtofovych)
- 1985 – Volodya the Great, Volodya the Little (directed by Viacheslav Kryshtofovych)
- 1986 – The Kings and the Cabbage
- 1986 – Guard Me, My Talisman

=== As a Production Designer ===
- 1984 – Captain Fracass (TV movie, 2 episodes, co-authored with Maria Levitska)
- 1986 – The Golden Chain
- 1987 – The Red Fairy
- 1988 – Self-portrait of the Unknown
- 1988 – The Meadow of Fairy Tales
- 1990 – Raspad (co-authored with Vasyl Zaruba)
- 1993 – Hetman's Kleynods – Golden Knight Prize of the International Conference of Slavic and Orthodox Peoples (1993) for the best pictorial solution
- 1995 – Helly and Knock
- 1997 – The Seventh Route
- 2000 – Black Council (9 episodes)
- 2012 – Mom, I love the pilot...
