= National Academy of Fine Arts and Architecture (Ukraine) =

Public university in Kyiv, Ukraine

Coordinates: 50.4587°N 30.5073°E

The National Academy of Fine Arts and Architecture
- Національна академія образотворчого мистецтва і архітектури
- Other name: NAFAA
- Type: Public | Research university | Art school | Architecture school
- Established: December 5, 1917
- Accreditation: Ministry of Education and Science of Ukraine
- Rector: Oleksandr Tsugorka
- Students: 800
- Location: Kyiv, Ukraine
- Website: naoma.edu.ua
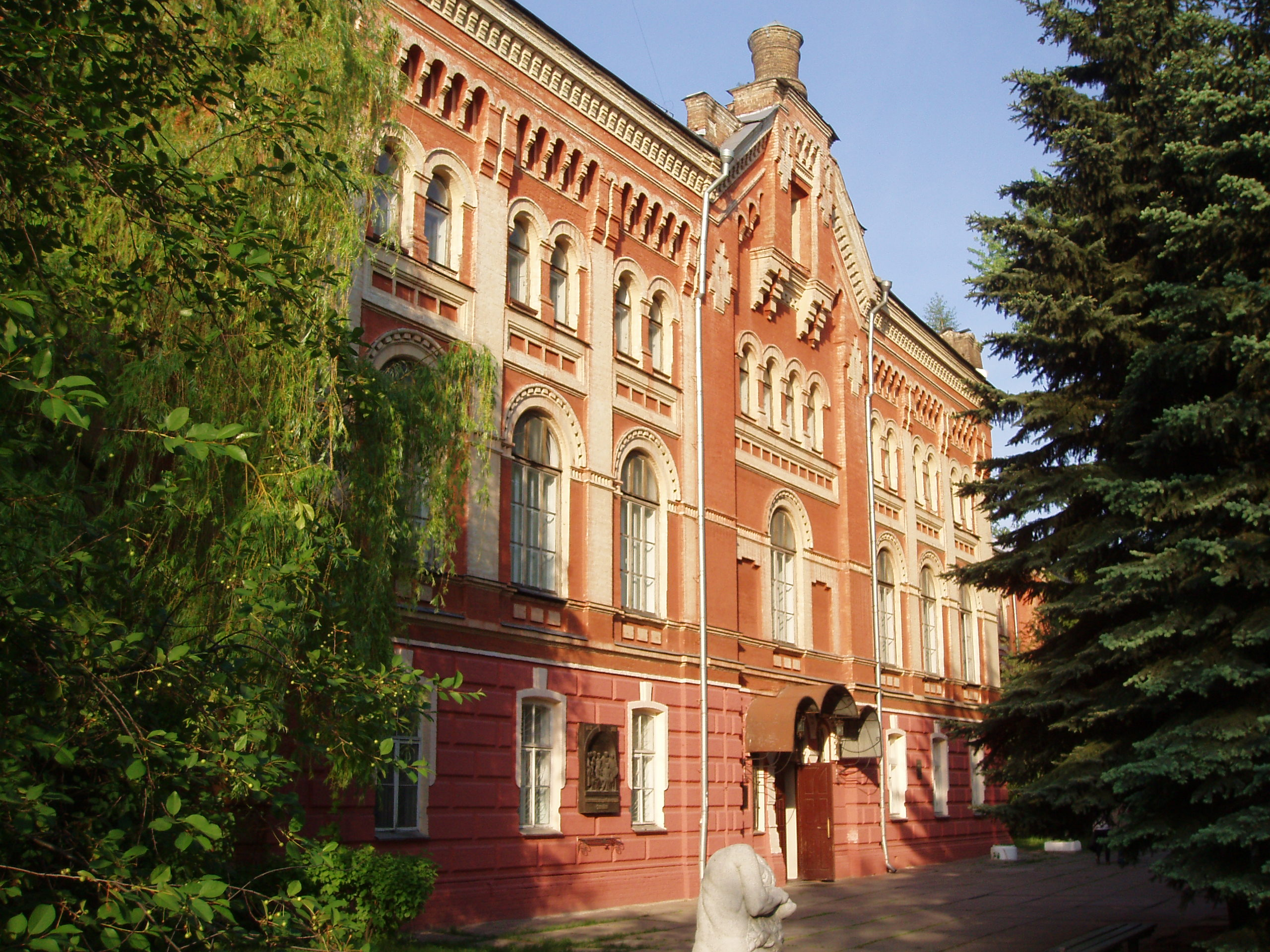

The National Academy of Fine Arts and Architecture (Ukrainian: Націона́льна акаде́мія образотво́рчого мисте́цтва і архітекту́ри, НАОМА / NAOMA) is a research-based art university in Kyiv, Ukraine specialising in visual arts and architecture, with departments of painting, sculpture, illustration, graphic design, stage design, architecture, art conservation, and art management. NAFAA offers coursework at the undergraduate level. Its graduate and post-graduate programs train students in the theory and history of art and architecture, aided by a research library that has more than 177,000 documents, including a number of rare art books and periodicals.

In 2022, the University of the Arts London and the Academy "twinned," signing a Memorandum of Understanding to share learnings, ideas, and resources. The "twinning" approach was launched by Universities UK in response to the Russian invasion. The goal was to "provide vital support in the short term, so students can continue their studies, and researchers can carry on with research. In the longer term, this collaboration will help play an important role in the rebuilding of Ukraine."

In 2022, NAFAA also founded a museum "to protect, preserve, complete, scientifically systematize, study and use movable monuments, museum collections, other objects of material and spiritual culture for research, educational, and educational purposes, which document the history of the development of the Academy's art, reflect the general background of historical progress and have historical, scientific, cultural, artistic and memorial value." In 2024, NAFAA hosted its first All-Ukrainian Scientific and Practical Conference where representatives from academic museums across Ukraine reported on the "formation of museum collections, scientific work in museums, storage and restoration of works of art."

In 2025, the Academy participated in a "Pilot Project on the Provision of State Aid for the Education of Children of Certain Categories of Persons Who Defended the Independence, Sovereignty and Territorial Integrity of Ukraine" that will reimburse the cost of tuition for the children of Ukrainian veterans.

== History ==
=== Early years ===
NAFAA was founded as the Ukrainian State Academy of Arts at December 5, 1917 in Kyiv. The Founding Committee was headed by Pavlutsky with the initiative of Ivan Steshenko, the General Secretary of the Ministry of Education of the Ukrainian People's Republic. The Statute of Academy was adopted by Central Rada at November 5 (18), 1917. The grand opening was held on 5 (18) December. The Academy was headed by the Council of Academy composed of Dmytro Antonovich, P. Zaitsev, D. Shcherbakovskaya (Scientific Secretary), and others. The first rector was Fedor Krichevsky.

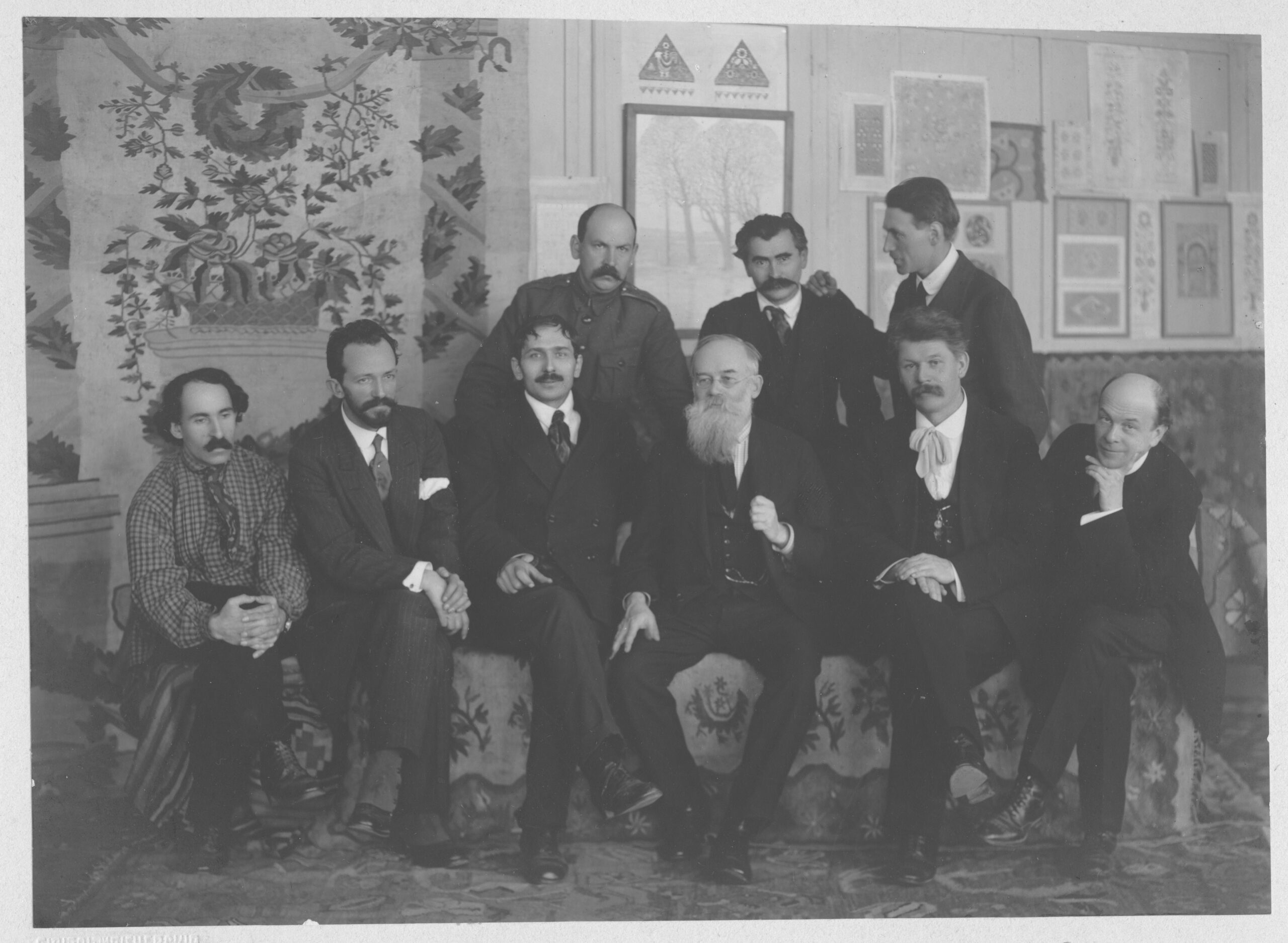
The founders of the Ukrainian Academy of Arts, on the day of its opening. Standing (left to right): Mr. H. Narbut, V. Krychevsky and M. Boichuk. Sit A. Manevich, O. Murashko, F. Krychevsky, M. Hrushevsky (head of the Central Rada), I. Steshenko, M. Burachek.

The first professors of the Academy were: Mykhailo Boichuk (monumental art), Mykola Burachek (landscape), Vasyl Krychevsky (architecture, composition), F. Krichevsky (painting, portrait), Abraham Manievich, Oleksandr Murashko, M. Zhuk (panel painting, drawing), Heorhiy Narbut (graphics). In 1921, additional professors were hired: L. Kramarenko (monumental and decorative painting), Vadym Meller (theater design), S. Nalepinska-Boichuk (engraving), E. Sagaidachny, B. Kratko (sculpture), A. Taran (mosaic). and others.

=== Locations ===
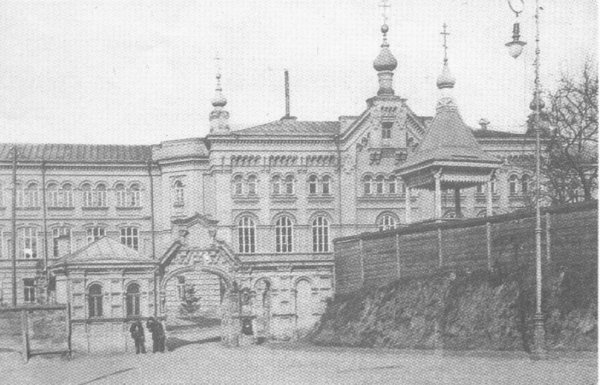
The "Teacher's House," the university building in 1917.

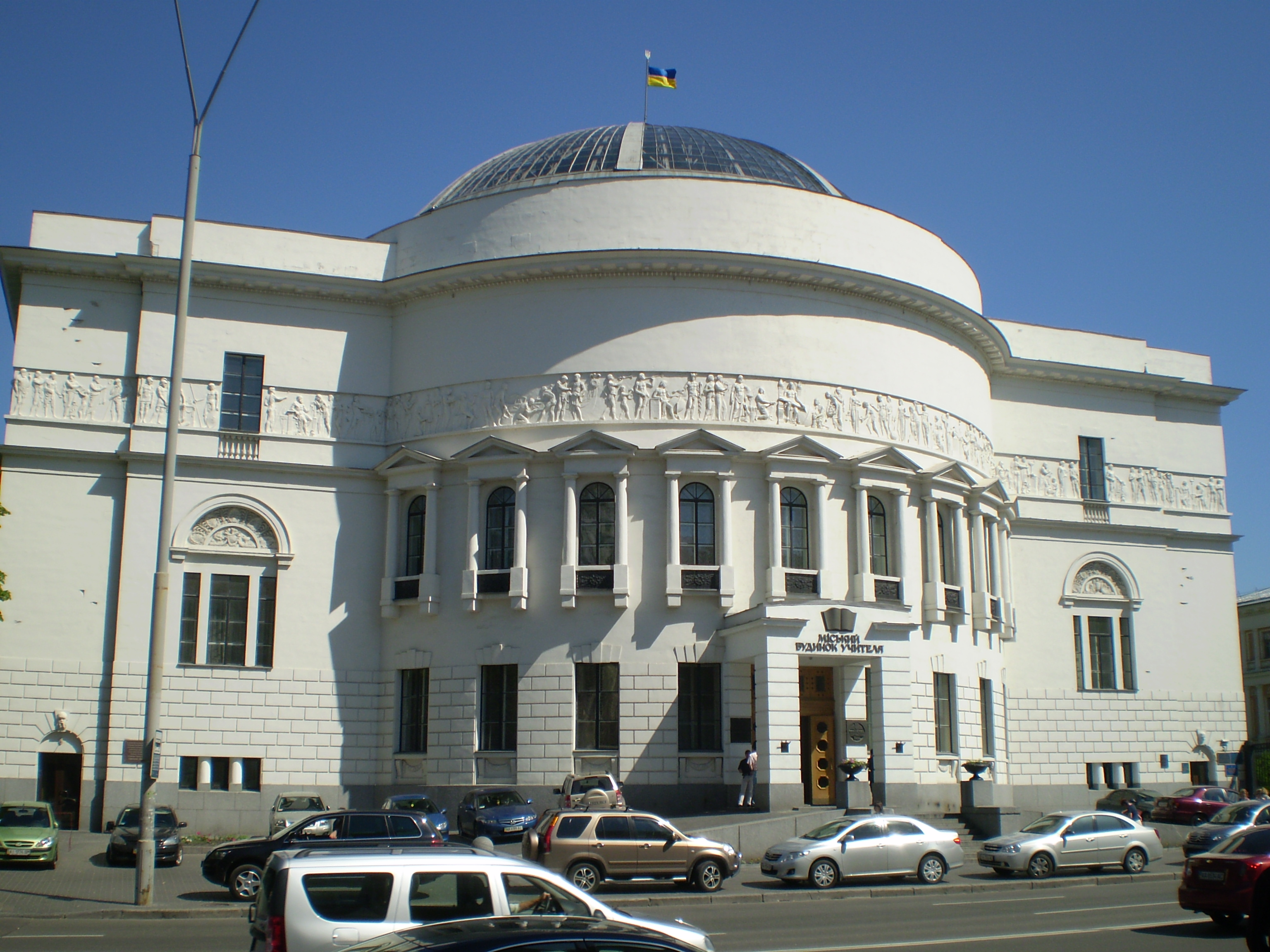
Former building of the Kyiv Theological Seminary

Initially, the Academy was located in the former Pedagogical Museum (Teacher's House) along with the Central Council of Ukraine, then it was transferred to the building of the former Tereshchenko's trade school. In February 1919, after the capture of Kyiv troops of the Red Army, Academy of Arts became a state organization with a research institute status. But in August 1919, after the capture of Kyiv Denikin's Volunteer Army, Ukrainian Academy of Arts has been credited to the not funded category. In addition the Academy has been expelled from its building, and all its belongings thrown into the attic. Rector of the Academy rented two unoccupied apartments in the same house at St. George's Lane, 11. These were placed painting studio, library and office.

In December 1920, after the restoration of Soviet regime in Kyiv, the Academy relocated in the former Noble Assembly building (stood in place of the building of Trade Unions on Krestchatyk). In 1922, the Academy was reorganized and renamed the Kyiv Institute of Plastic Arts. In 1924 Ukrainian Institute of Architecture was joined to the Kyiv Arts Institute. The newly named Kyiv Arts Institute was located in a former building Kyiv Theological Seminary where it is located today. With new name were found new departments: film and photography, polygraphy, ceramics art and art political education teachers.

=== Competing ideologies ===
In a short time the Kyiv Arts Institute became one of the leading art schools of the Soviet Union. But from the late 1920s to the early 1930s, ideological infighting led to a loss in status. In 1930, the publishing department and a number of other institutional resources closed. The rector was dismissed, and the university was reorganized in keeping with Proletkult ideology. The institute was renamed the Kyiv Institute of Proletarian Artistic Culture (see also Working class culture ) and new departments were created, including art and propaganda, the decoration of proletarian life, the sculptural decoration of socialist cities, communist art education.

In 1934, along with another reform came another name: first, the All-Ukrainian Institute of Arts and, then, the Kyiv State Art Institute. Academic educational methods also returned. Priority was given to panel painting, and the departments of graphics, political poster, monumental art and, later, the department of technology and art conservation (cultural heritage) reopened. Around the same time, the department of theory and history of art was founded.

=== Modern form ===
In 1992, by a Resolution of the Cabinet of Ministers of Ukraine, the university returned to its original name — the All-Ukrainian Academy of Arts. Then, according to a decree of the Cabinet of Ministers of Ukraine dated March 17, 1998, it took its current name: The National Academy of Fine Arts and Architecture. By the decision of the State Accreditation Commission of Ukraine in July 1997 Academy has IV accredited level, and in November 1999, certified. In September 2000 of Presidential Decree Academy was granted the status of national institution as outstanding artistic education center for significant achievements in teaching and research activities, and for the preparation of the artistic and scientific-pedagogical personnel in the field of Fine Arts and Architecture.

== Faculties and departments ==
Under the undergraduate program there are 3 faculties, 4 general and 10 faculty-tied departments. Two more departments are available for the post graduate degree (aspirantura). Before the Russian aggression against Ukraine in 2014, there was a Crimean branch (campus) of the university.

=== Undergraduate ===
- Faculty of Visual Arts and Restoration, the base school that traces its roots to the Ukrainian State Academy of Arts
  - Department of Painting and Composition;
  - Department of Graphic Arts;
  - Department of Sculpture;
  - Department of Technique and Restoration of Artwork (art conservation);
  - Department of Scenography and Screen Arts;
  - Department of Design.
- Faculty of Architecture
  - Department of Architectural Design;
  - Department of Theory and History of Architecture and Synthesis of Arts;
  - Department of Architectural Structures.
- Faculty of Theory and History of Art
  - Department of Theory and History of Arts.
- General academic departments
  - Department of Drawing;
  - Department of Culture and Social-Humanitarian Studies;
  - Department of Foreign Languages;
  - Department of Physical Education.

=== Graduate ===
- Aspirantura
  - Department of Visual Arts;
  - Department of theory of architecture and conservation of monuments.

== Early faculty art ==
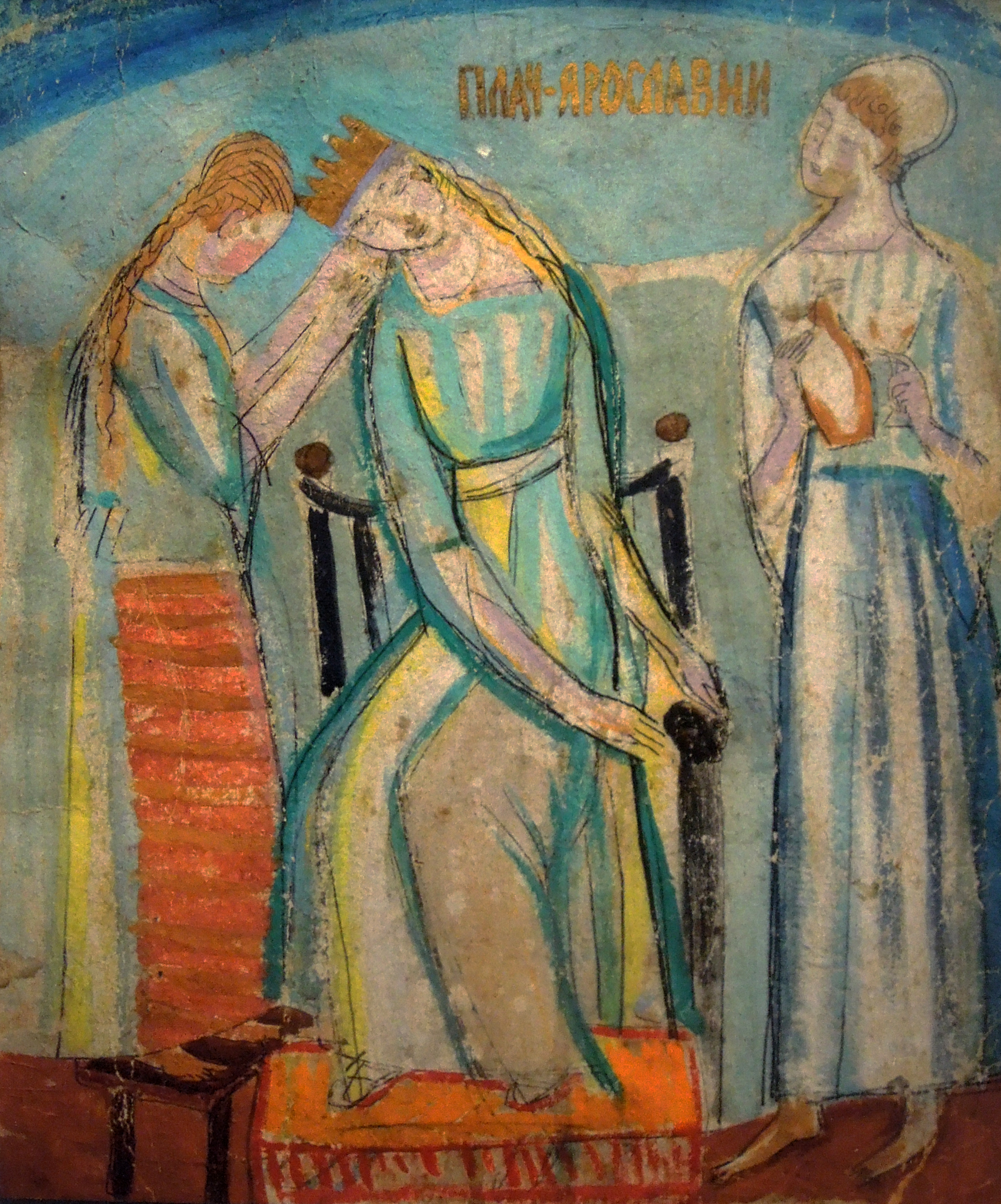
Mykhailo Boychuk, Yaroslavna's Lament, ca. 1910.

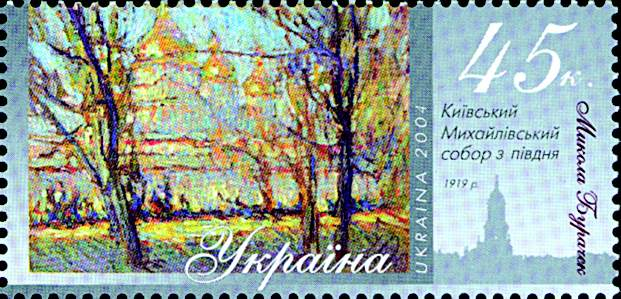
Ukrainian stamp, based on a painting by Mykola Burachek, 1919.

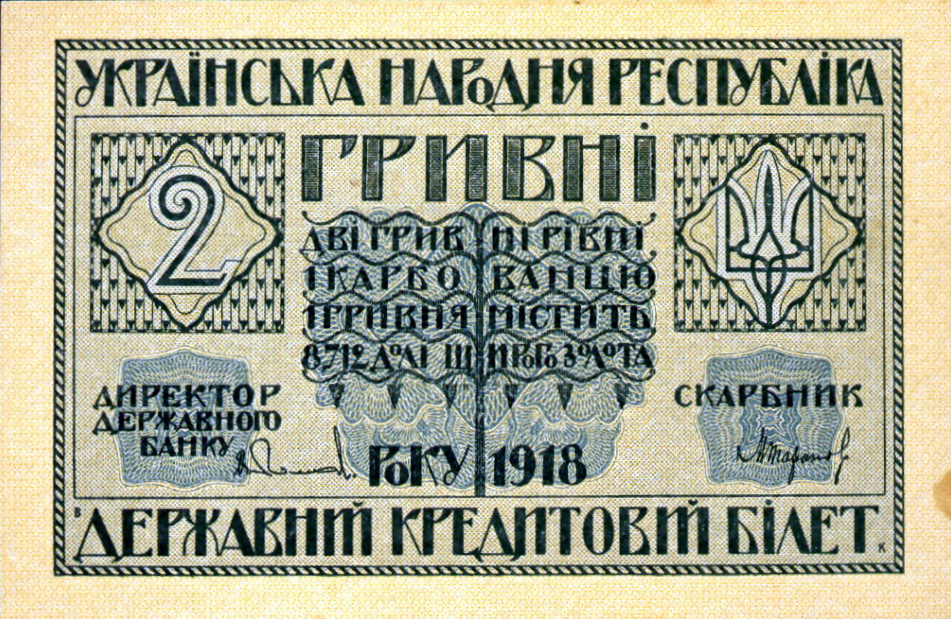
Front of the ₴2 Hryvnia bill, designed by Vasyl Krychevsky, 1918, for the Ukrainian People's Republic.

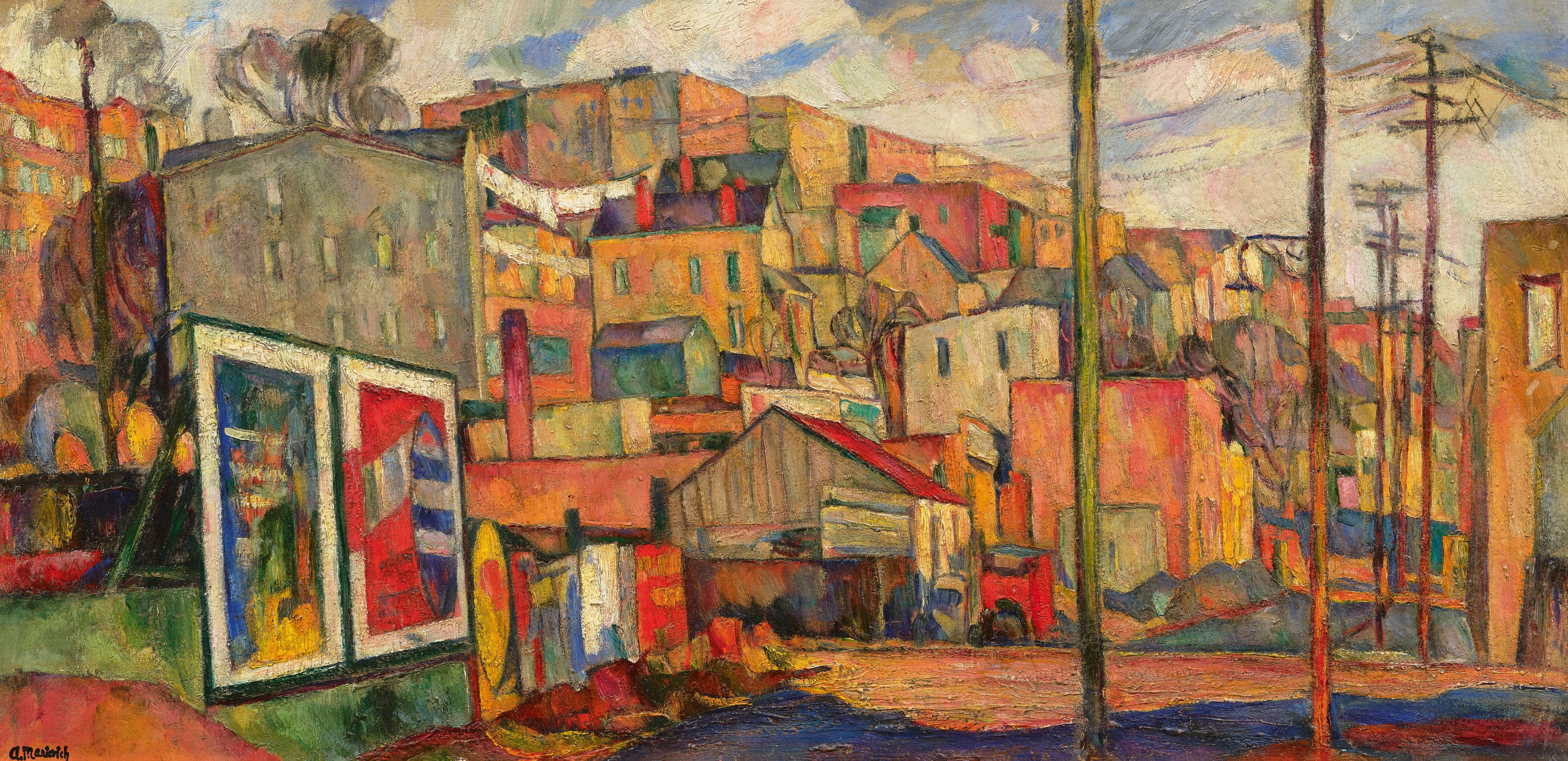
Abraham Manievich, Morris Avenue, New York, ca. 1925.

Vadym Meller, sketch of the decoration for the performance, "Hello, on the Wave 477," 1929.

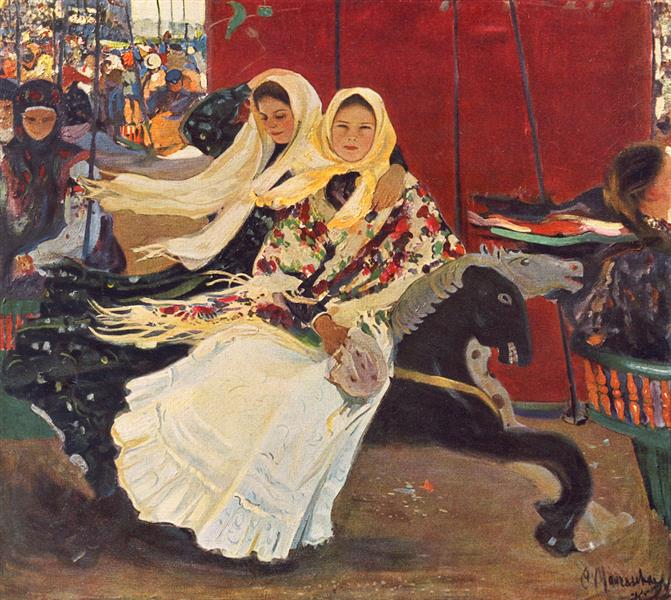
Oleksandr Murashko, A Carousel, 1906.

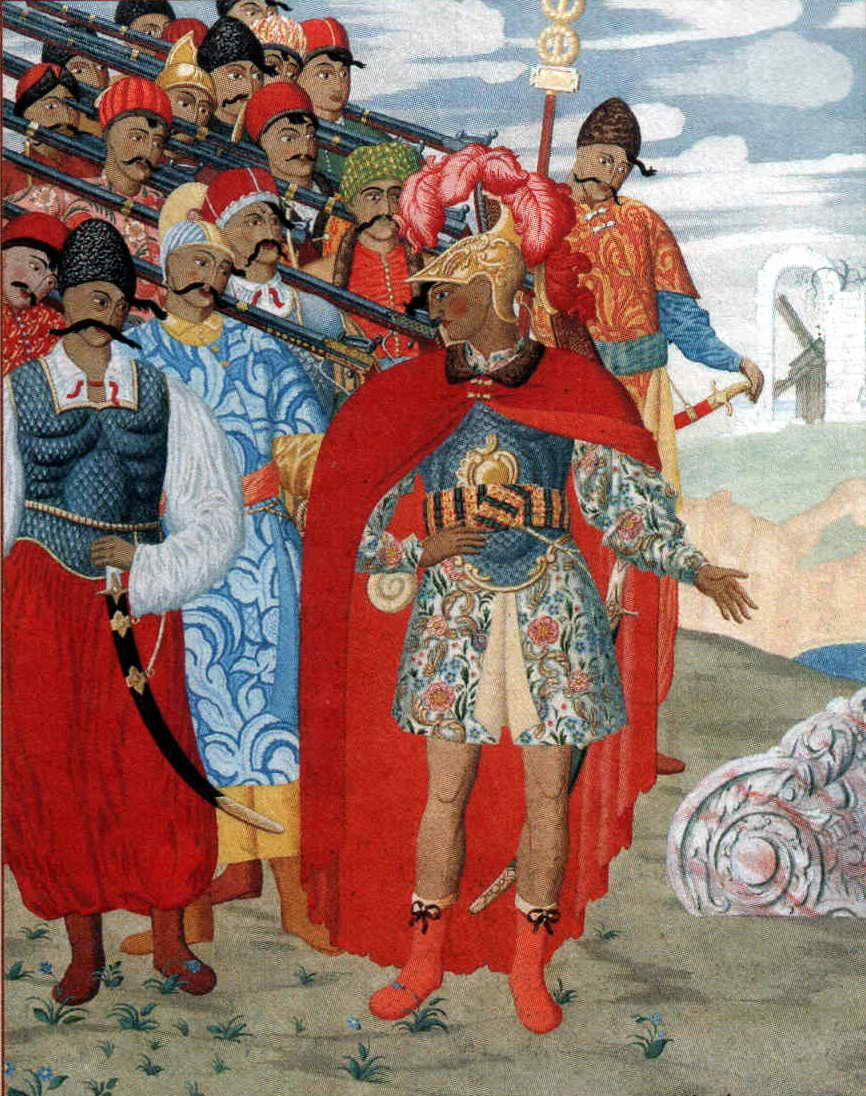
Heorhiy Narbut, illustration "Eneida" from the book by I. Kotlyarevsky, 1920

== Alumni ==
- Andriy Chebykin
- Iryna Horoshko
- Zinaida Kubar
- Velerii Lamakh
- Giennadij Jerszow
- Mykola Malyshko
- Stepan Nechai
- Inna Bychenkova
- Stepan Koval
- Mariia Yunak

== See also ==
List of universities in Ukraine
