= Vasyl Krychevsky =

Ukrainian painter, graphic artist, and architect (1873–1952)

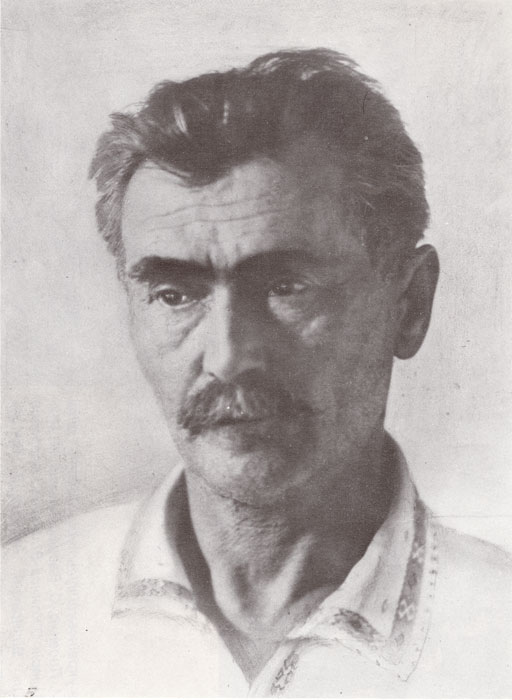
- Krychevsky in 1928
- Born: Vasyl Hryhorovych Krychevsky; January 12, 1873; Vorozhba, Kharkov Governorate, Russian Empire (now Ukraine)
- Died: November 15, 1952 (aged 79); Caracas, Venezuela
- Resting place: Saint Andrew Cemetery, South Bound Brook, New Jersey, United States
- Education: Railroad school, Kharkiv, Russian Empire
- Known for: Painting, drawing, architecture design, graphic design, film
- Notable work: Poltava Governorate Administration building; Shevchenko Museums in Kyiv and Kaniv; Coat of arms of Ukraine, 1918; Writers' building Rolit; Zvenihora (movie, director A. Dovzhenko) Art and History advisor;
- Movement: Ukrainian impressionism, Ukrainian Art Nouveau
- Spouse: Yevheniya Scherbakyvska

Vasyl Hryhorovych Krychevsky (Ukrainian: Василь Григорович Кричевський; January 12, 1873 – November 15, 1952) was a Ukrainian painter, architect, art scholar, graphic artist, film art consultant, pedagogue and master of applied art and decorative art. He is the designer of the 1918 Ukrainian coat of arms, state seals, banknotes. He was the brother of Ukrainian painter Fedir Krychevsky.

== Biography ==
Vasyl Krychevsky was born in the village of Vorozhba, near Lebedyn, to a family of eight children where he was the eldest. His father Hryhoriy Yakymovych Krychevsky was a county state doctor of Jewish descent who converted to Orthodox Christianity and married a Ukrainian woman, Praskovia Hryhorivna.

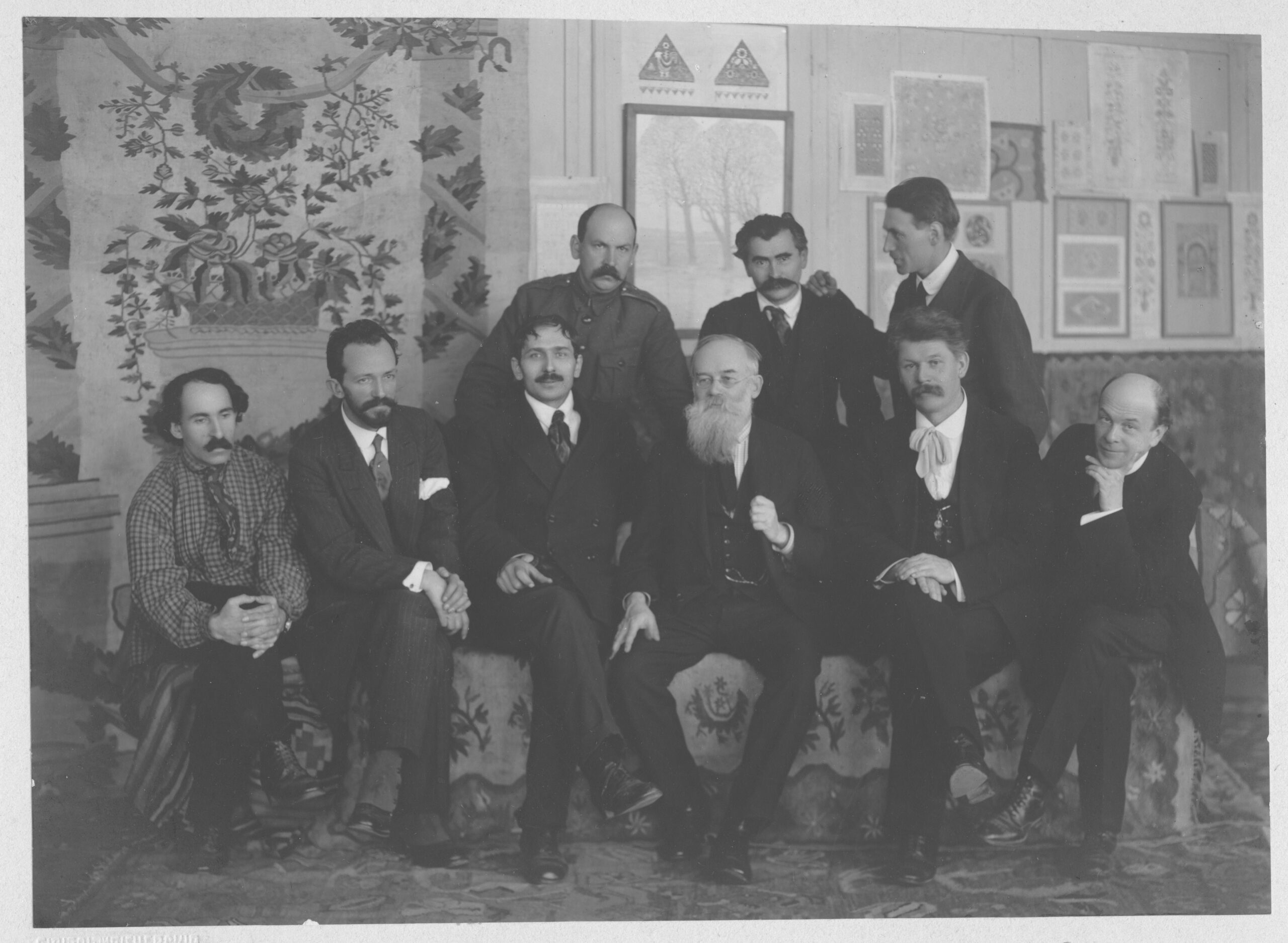
Founders of the Ukrainian academy of arts, 1917. From left, sitting: Abram Manevich, Oleksandr Murashko, Fedir Krychevsky, Mykhailo Hrushevsky, Ivan Steshenko, Mykola Burachek, standing: Heorhiy Narbut, Vasyl Krychevsky, Mykhailo Boychuk.

Krychevsky had little formal education, but a deep interest in Ukrainian folklore and art history. During the First World War, he was one of the founders and rectors of the Ukrainian State Academy of Arts. In the 1920s he taught at the Kyiv Institute of Plastic Arts, the Kyiv Architectural Institute. Among the students – Joseph Karakis, who studied from Krychevsky "Interior of residential and public buildings" as well as painting techniques. He then taught at the Odesa Art School and served in the architectural department of the Kiev State Art Institute until 1941.

Krychevsky moved to Lviv in 1943 where he was appointed a rector of a new Ukrainian art school, which eventually became the Lviv National Academy of Arts. After the World War II, he lived briefly in Paris before immigrating to South America in 1948. He died in Caracas, the capital of Venezuela on November 15, 1952.

== Artistic career ==
Krychevsky first gained public recognition in 1903 when he won the architectural competition to build the Poltava Zemstvo Building (now the Poltava Local Lore Museum). His design of the building was based on the traditions of Ukrainian folk architecture.

As a painter, he created a total of about 3000 paintings, drawings, ornamental designs, bookcovers. His work was influenced by French impressionism.

It was at the request of President Mykhailo Hrushevsky that Krychevsky designed the state emblems and seals of the Ukrainian People's Republic as well as the Republic's banknotes. Krychevsky was a collector and student of Ukrainian folk art, and promoted such handicrafts among common people.

From 1907 to 1910, Krychevsky designed sets and costumes for over 15 plays and operas including Mykhailo Starytsky's Bohdan Khmelnytsky and Bedřich Smetana's The Bartered Bride. From 1917 to 18 he worked with the Ukrainian National Theater.

On several projects Krychevsky worked along with another Ukrainian architect Petro Kostyrko who in 1960 did reconstruction of the former Poltava Governorate Administration building. Some of his works are present abroad, the largest set of works is in the Ukrainian Museum in New York.

== Gallery ==
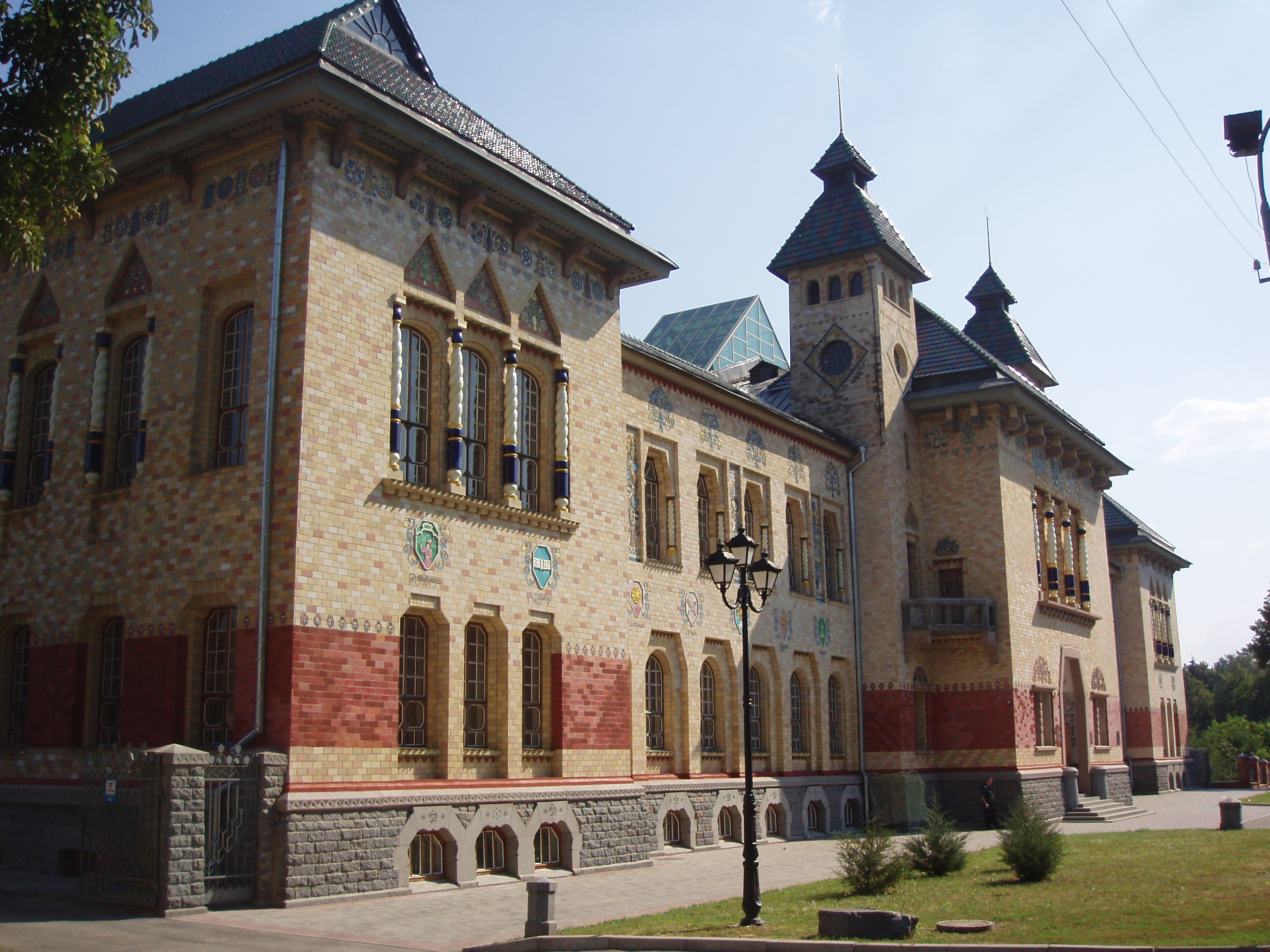
Poltava Governorate Zemstvo Building, 1903

Coat of arms of Ukraine, 1917

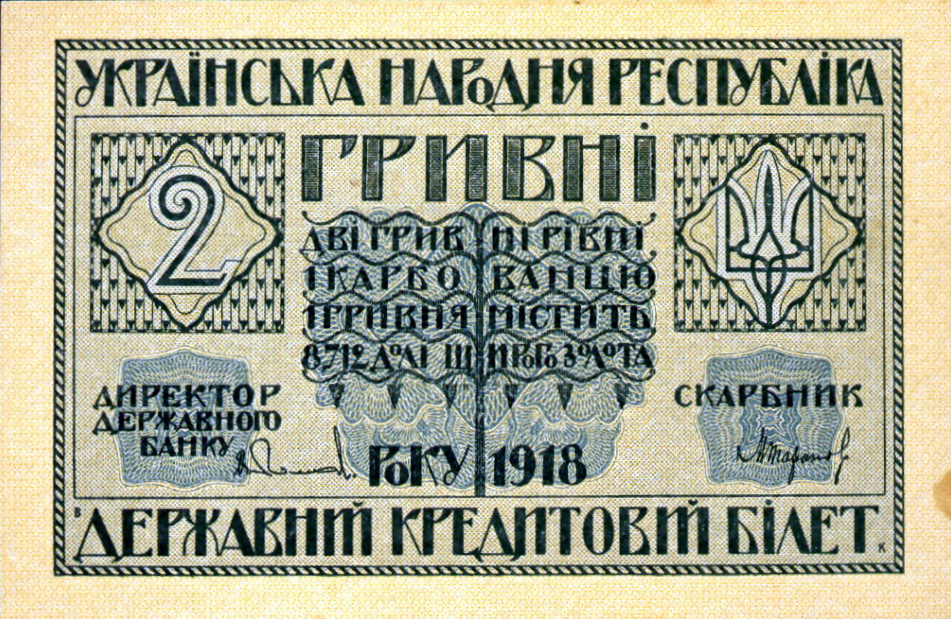
Two hryvnia banknote, 1918

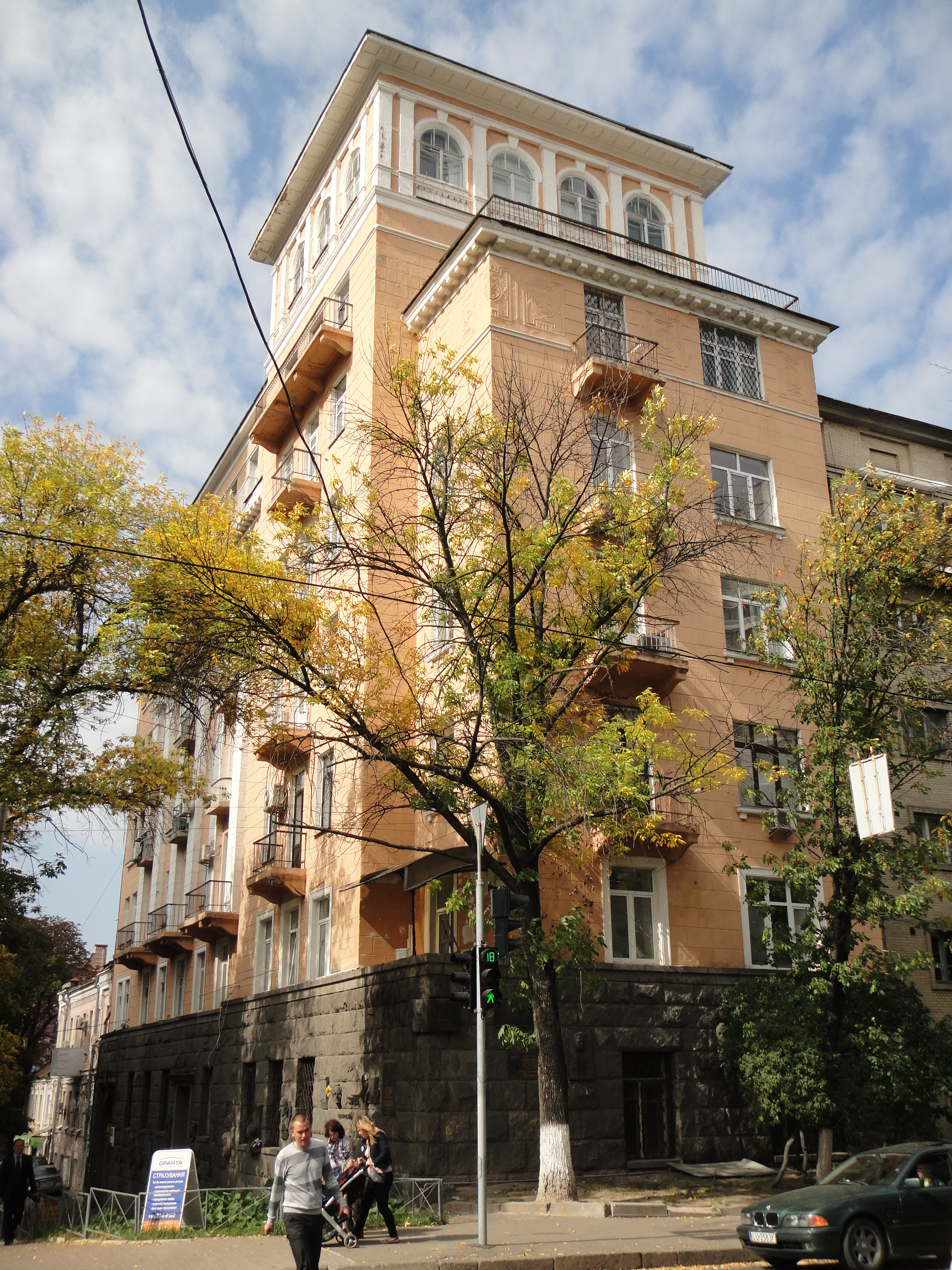
Rolit building of writers, along with Petro Kostyrko

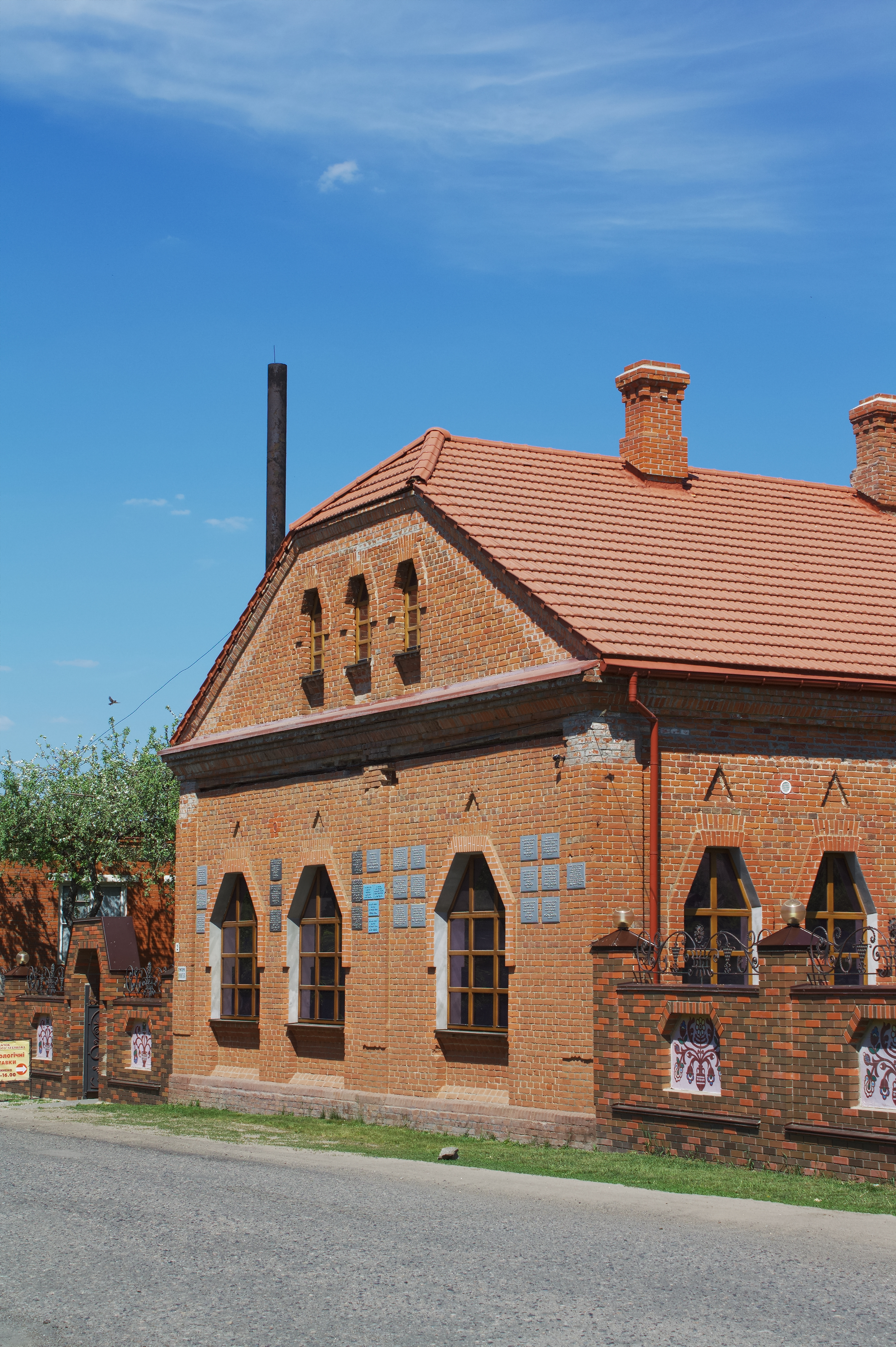
Pottery training and exhibition center in Opishnia, 1916

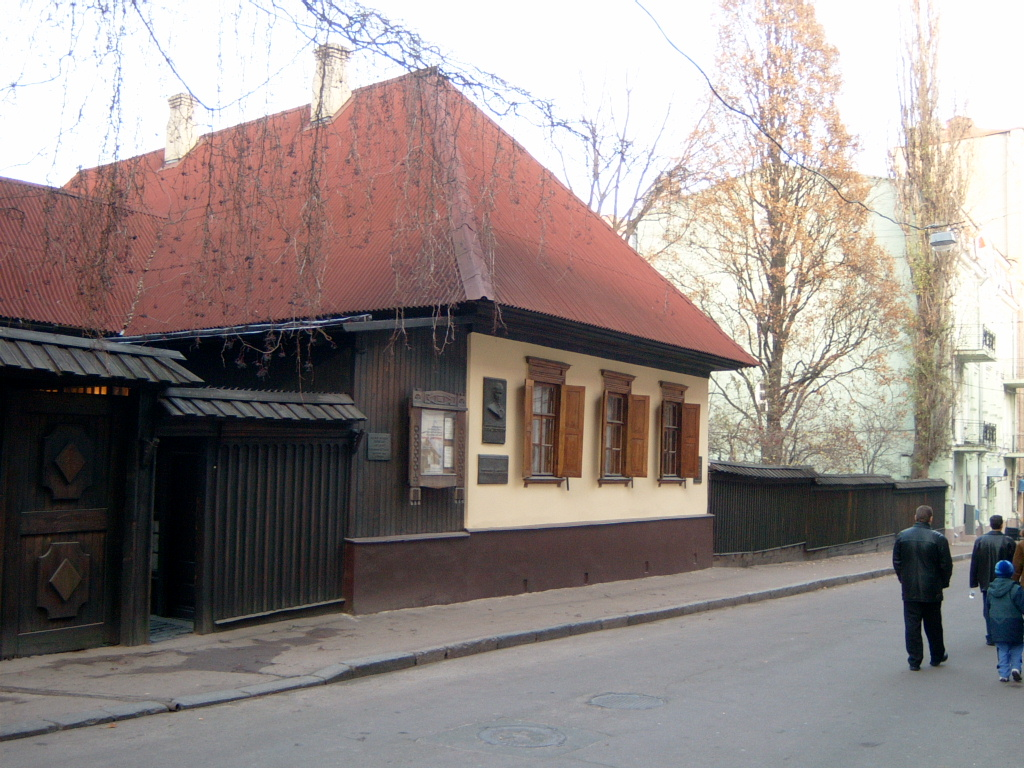
Shevchenko museum, 1928

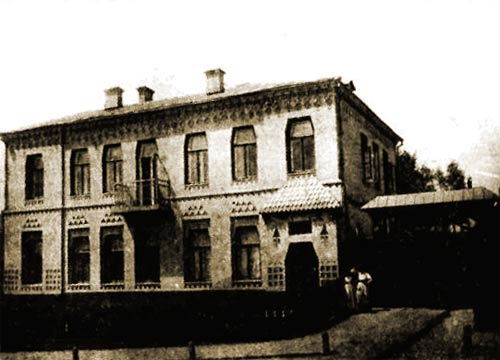
Shchitkivsky building, 1908

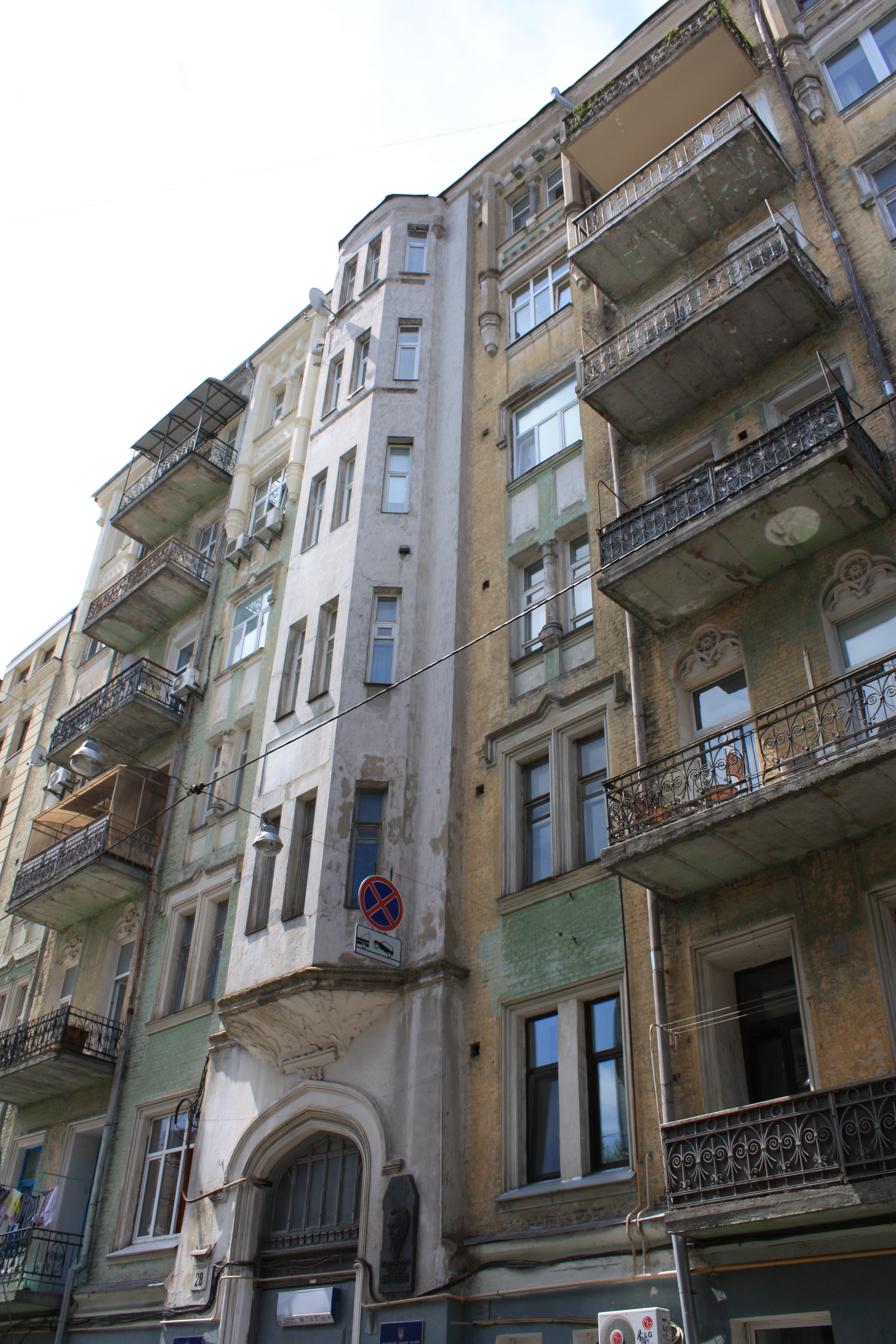
Kyiv apartment house

== See also ==
- Ukrainian Venezuelan
