= Oleksandr Murashko =

Ukrainian painter (1875–1919)

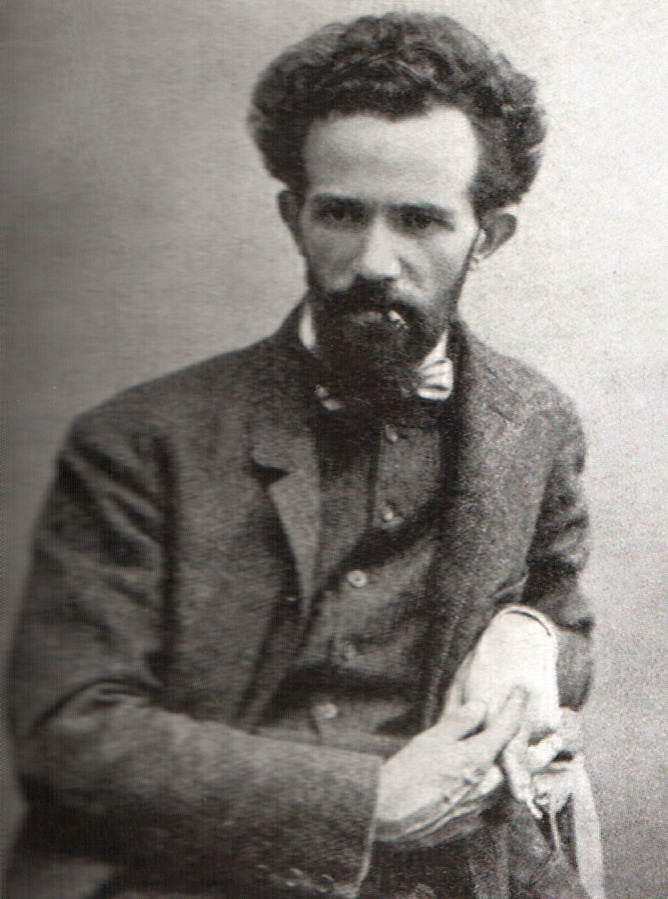
Oleksandr Murashko (1905)

Oleksandr Oleksandrovych Murashko (Ukrainian: Олександр Олександрович Мурашко; 7 September [O.S. 26 August] 1875 – June 14, 1919) was a prominent Ukrainian artist, widely known for his unusually expressive paintings.

== Life and career ==
Murashko was born in Kyiv. His stepfather, Oleksandr Ivanovych Murashko, had an icon-painting workshop and worked on the interior of St Volodymyr's Cathedral. The future painter's uncle Mykola Murashko was the founder of Kyiv Painting School, which produced a number of notable painters including Mykhailo Zhuk, Ivan Yizhakevych, Petro Kholodnyi, Valentin Serov, Kazimir Malevich and Vassili Kandinsky.

In 1894, with recommendations from several prominent artists, he entered the Imperial Academy of Arts in St Petersburg. In 1896, he became a student of Ilya Repin; he is one of those depicted in Yelena Makovskaya-Luksch's group portrait, Repin's Students. In 1901, he travelled abroad, visiting Germany, where he studied with Anton Ažbe in Munich, Italy, and France, where he was greatly influenced.

Murashko became a successful artist; he has been called "the most important Ukrainian artist of the turn of the century". His painting Carousel won the gold medal at the Munich Exposition in 1909, and he exhibited in Venice, Rome, Amsterdam, Berlin, Cologne, and Düsseldorf.

From 1909 to 1912, Murashko taught at the Kyiv Art School. In 1913, he opened his own studio in the Ginsburg skyscraper, where many young Jewish artists were trained, including Mark Epstein. He had a great influence on Kazimir Malevich.

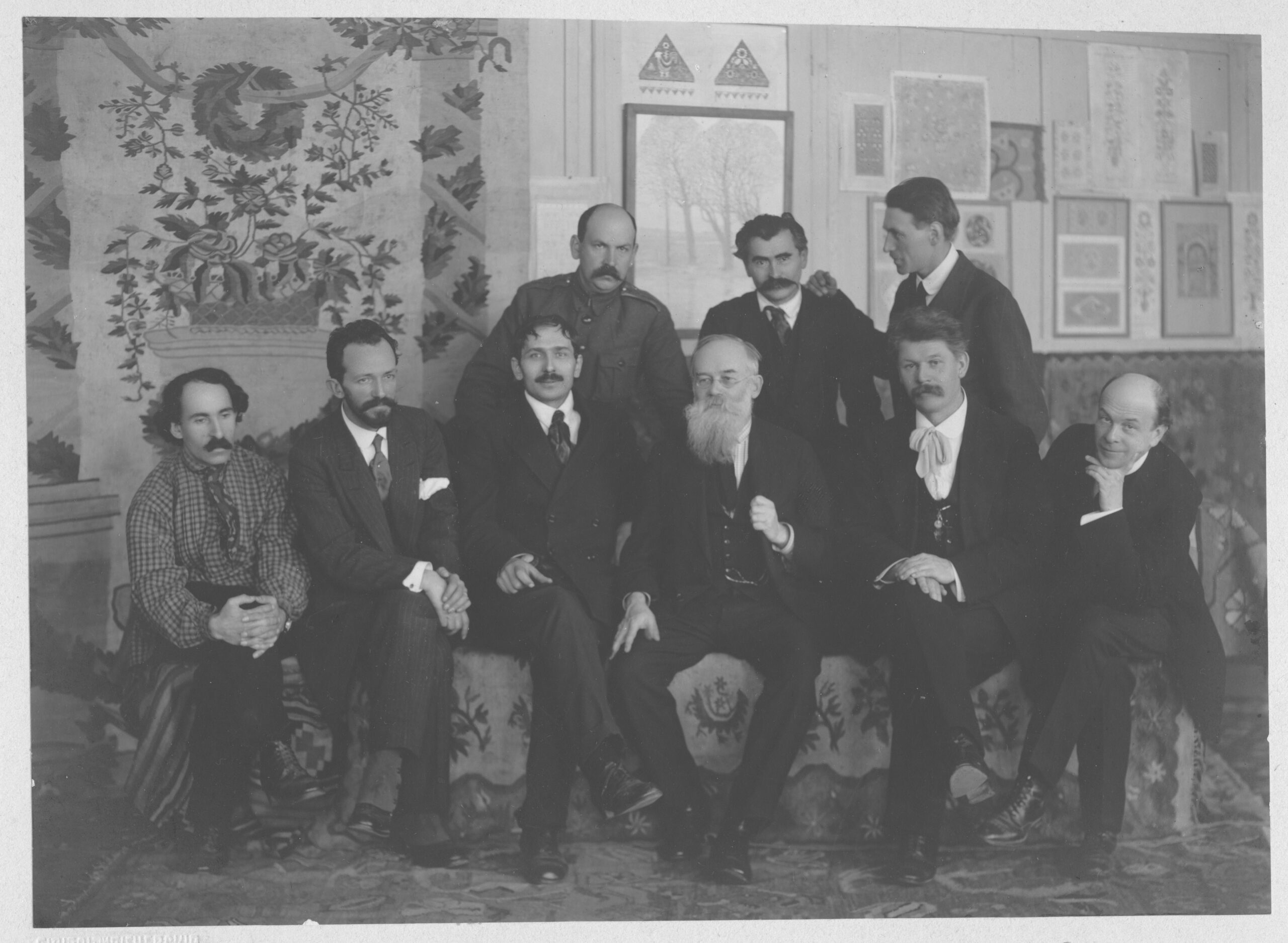
Founders of the Ukrainian academy of arts, 5 September 1917: Sitting: Abram Manevich, Oleksandr Murashko, Fedir Krychevsky, Mykhailo Hrushevsky, Ivan Steshenko, Mykola Burachek. Standing: Heorhiy Narbut, Vasyl Krychevsky, Mykhailo Boychuk.

He was a patriotic Ukrainian, one of the adherents of the "Young Muse" movement which was started in 1906 by Modernists who drew on developments elsewhere in Europe to make Ukrainian art more progressive. He founded the Association of Kyiv Artists in 1916 and the following year co-founded the Ukrainian State Academy of Arts.

In 1909, Murashko married Marguerite Kruger, a notary's daughter. In 1910, after his father's death, he bought a small house in the Kyiv suburb of Lukyanivka. He was taken away from the house, apparently by a street gang, and shot from behind on June 14, 1919. His funeral was well attended and he was buried in the Lukyanivsky Cemetery.

== Works ==
Originally a realist in the style of the Peredvizhniki, Murashko later painted in a "refined", Impressionist style influenced by his time in Munich and Paris. His Modernism in turn influenced later Ukrainian artists in the Socialist Realist period. His works are less often narrative and unusually expressive for Ukrainian paintings of the time.

=== Selected list of paintings ===
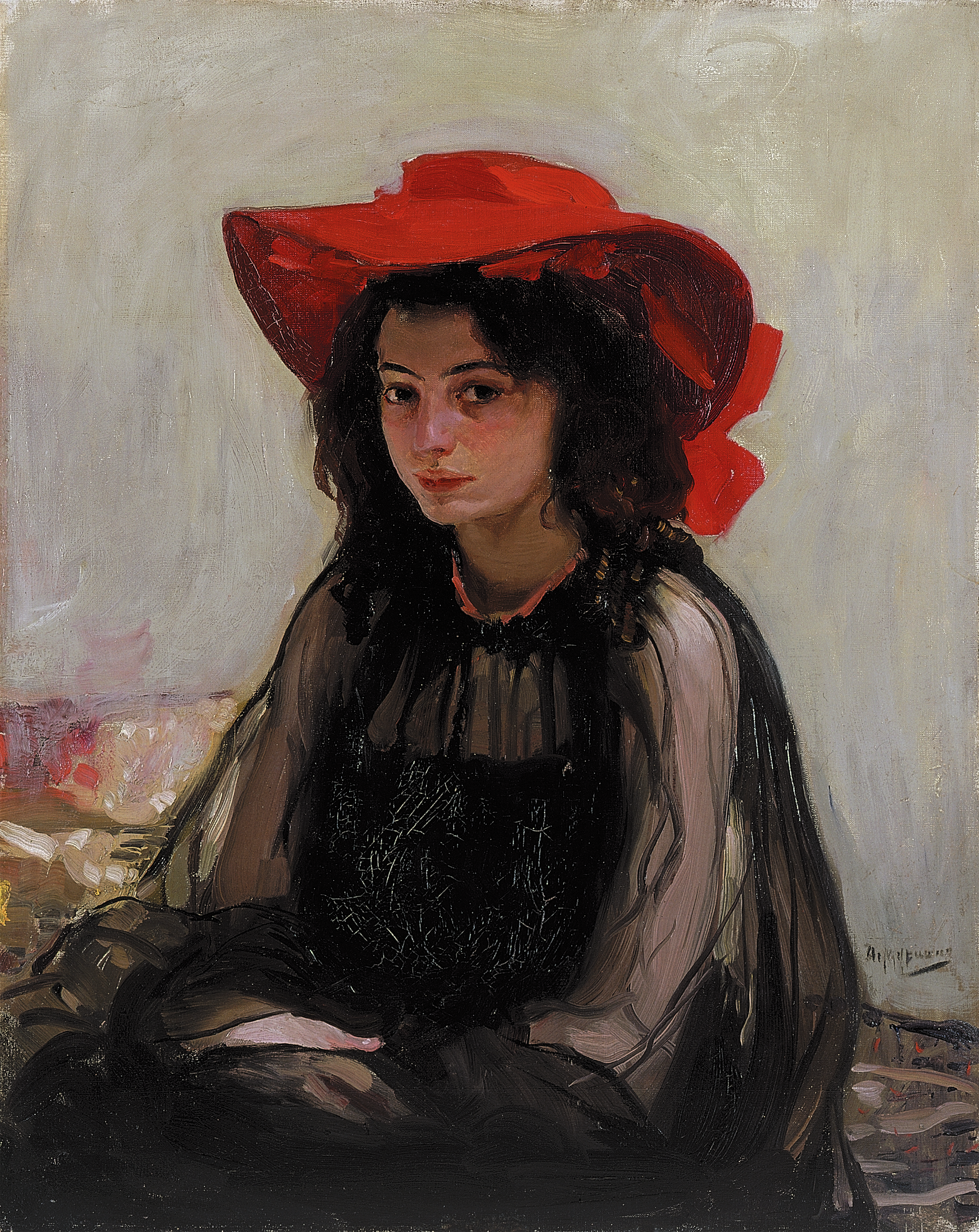
Girl in a Red Hat (1902–1903)

- Portrait of Nikolai Petrov, 1897–98
- Portrait of Helen Murashko, 1898–99
- Portrait of Olga Nesterov, 1900
- The Funeral of the Chieftain, 1900
- Parisian. At the Cafe, 1902–03
- Girl in a Red Hat, 1902–03
- A Girl with a Dog. Portrait of T. Yazevoyi, 1903–04
- Portrait of Professor Adrian Prahova, 1904
- Winter, 1905
- At the Embroidery Frame. Portrait of Helena Prahova, 1905
- Carousel, 1906
- In the Stern. Portrait of George Murashko, 1906
- Sunspots. Portrait of George Murashko, 1908
- Portrait of Marguerite Murashko, 1909
- The Annunciation, 1909
- Portrait of Ludmilla Kuksin, 1910
- Portrait of Vera Dytyatinoyi, 1910
- Portrait of Vera Yepanchin, 1910
- By the Pond. Portrait of Marguerite Murashko, 1913
- Peasant Family, 1914
- Washerwoman, 1914
- Portrait of an Old Woman, 1916
- Woman with Flowers, 1918
- Self Portrait, 1918
Paintings by Oleksandr Murashko

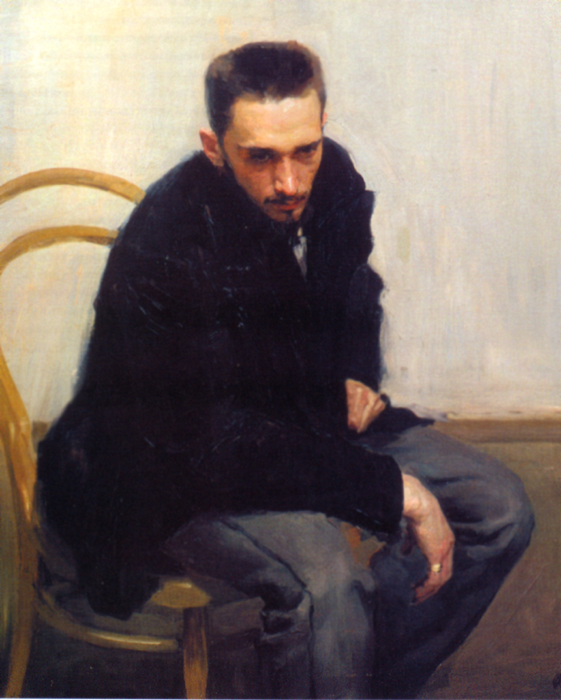
Portrait of Mykola Petrov

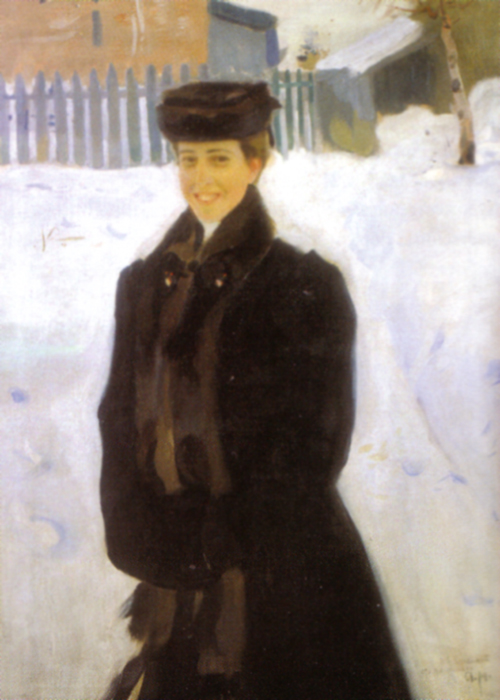
Portrait of Ludmilla Kuksin (1910)

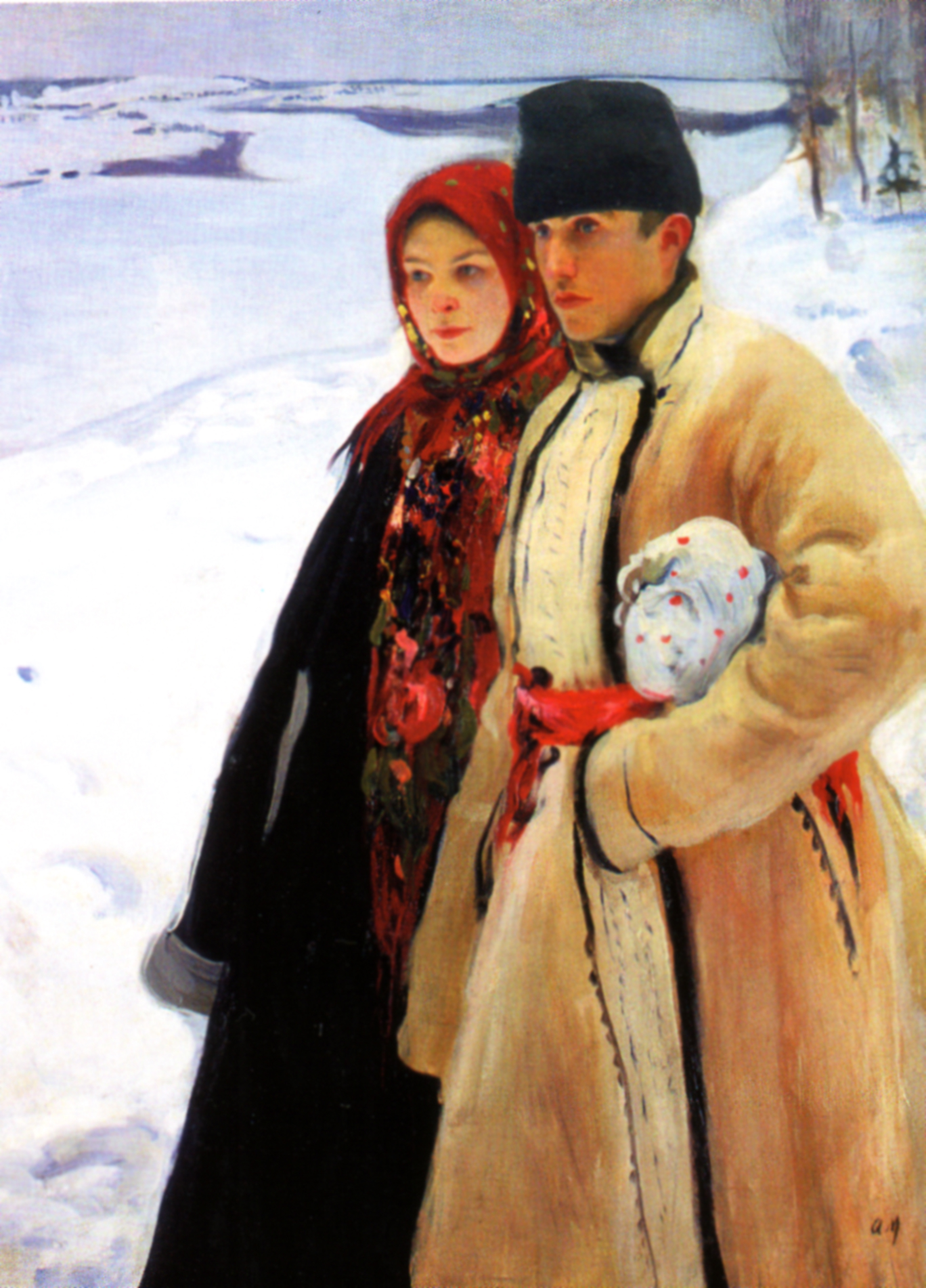
Winter (1905)

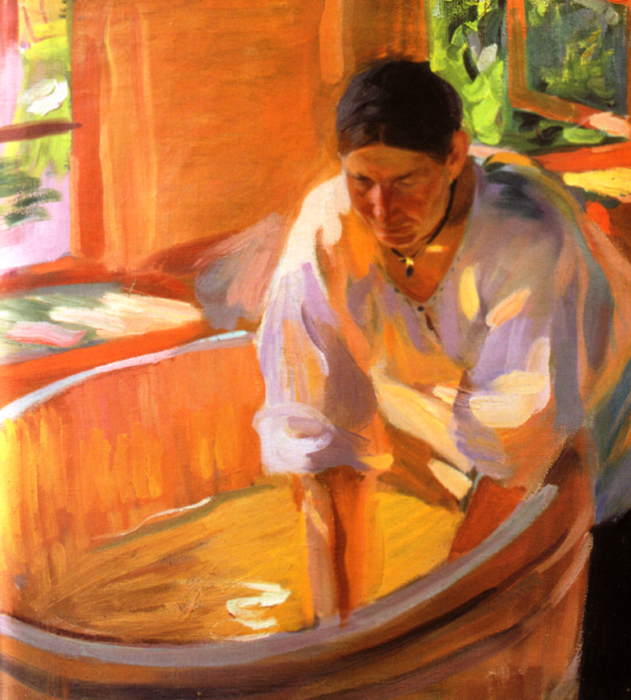
Washerwoman (1914)

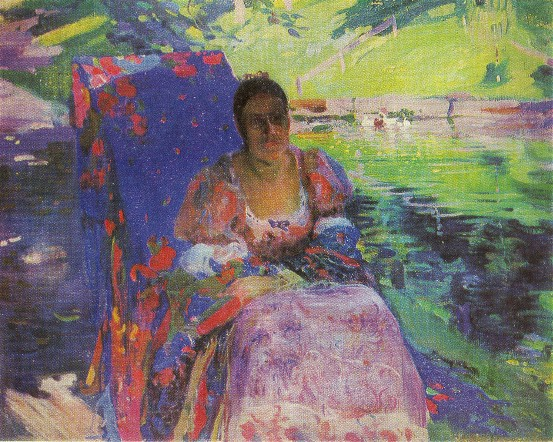
By the Pond. Portrait of Marguerite Murashko (1913)
