= Mykola Burachek =

Ukrainian painter

Mykola Burachek MAWUkrSSR
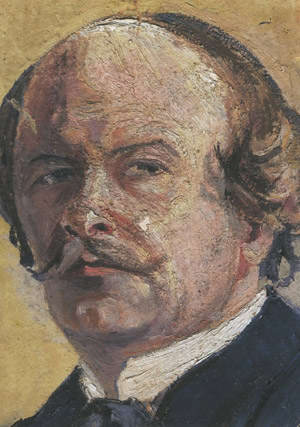
- Self-portrait (date unknown)
- Education: Henri Matisse, Maurice Denis
- Occupations: Painter, art historian, pedagogue
- Works: Landscape painting, still life (see §)
- Movement: Impressionism

Mykola Burachek or Buraček (Ukrainian: Микола Бурачек, March 16, 1871 in Letychiv, Podillia Guberniya (now Khmelnytskyi Oblast, Ukraine) – August 12, 1942, in Kharkov, USSR, now Ukraine), was a Ukrainian Impressionist painter and pedagogue.

== Biography ==
Burachek studied at the Kyiv School of Drawing with Khariton Platonov (late 1890s) and with Jan Stanisławski at the Kraków Academy of Fine Arts (1905–1910). He also studied in Paris, in the studio of Henri Matisse (1910–1911). His first exhibition was in 1907.

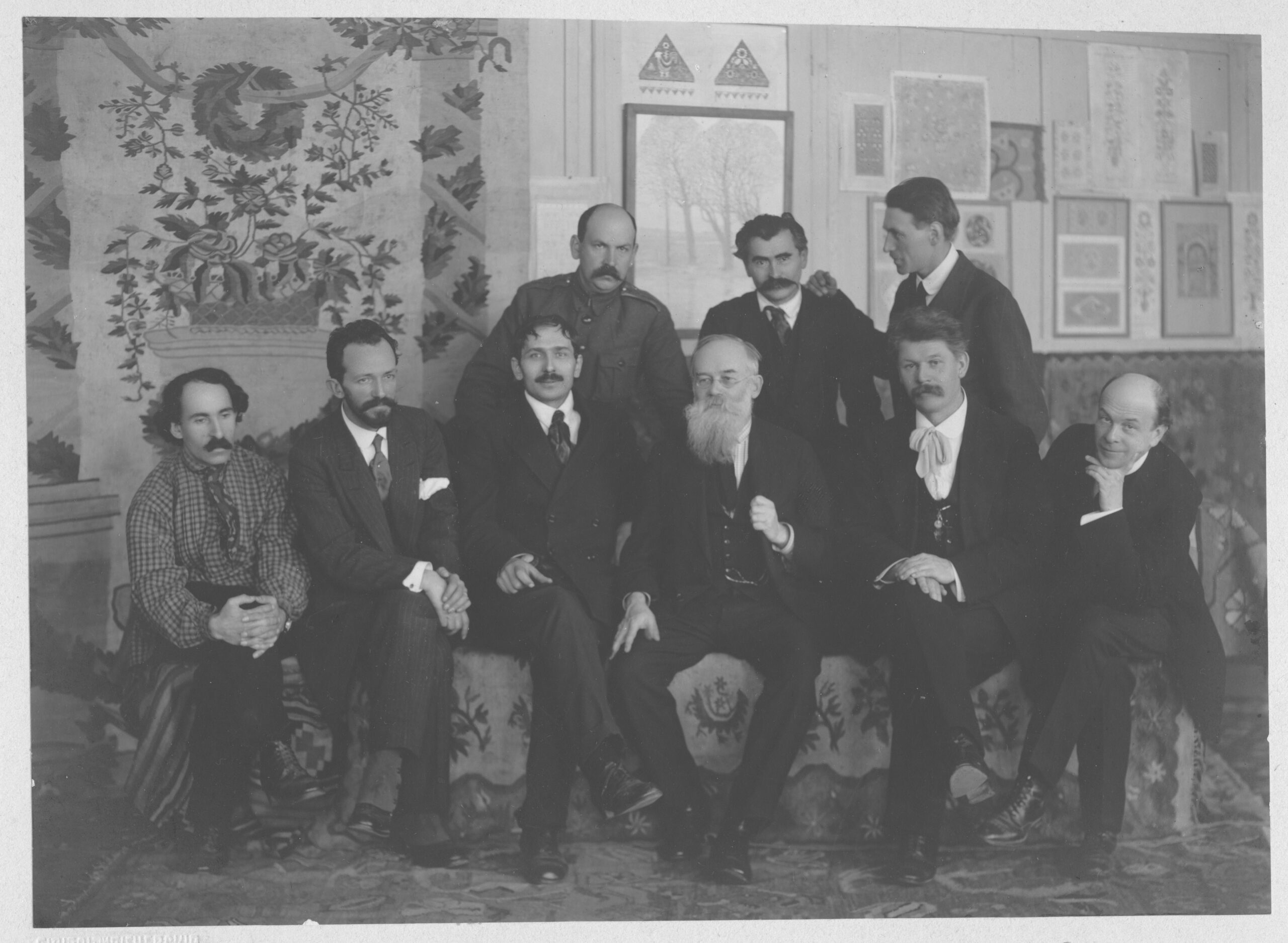
Founders of the Ukrainian academy of arts, 1917. From left, sitting: Abram Manevich, Oleksandr Murashko, Fedir Krychevsky, Mykhailo Hrushevsky, Ivan Steshenko, Mykola Burachek, standing: Heorhiy Narbut, Vasyl Krychevsky, Mykhailo Boychuk.

In 1917–1922 he taught at the Ukrainian Academy of Arts in Kiev and then at the Kiev State Art Institute and the Mykola Lysenko Music and Drama School in Kiev. Then he moved to Kharkiv and became the rector of the Kharkiv Art Institute (1925). In 1934, he returned to Kiev and taught at the Kiev State Art Institute.

Burachek also worked for theaters as a stage designer. In 1934, he worked for the Kharkiv theaters, designing stages for the plays Marusia Churai by Ivan Mykytenko and Set Your Heart Free by Marko Kropyvnytsky. In 1937, he worked with Donetsk theaters.

A virtuoso landscape painter, he painted Impressionist landscapes devoted to the Ukrainian themes such as Morning on the Dnieper (1934), Apple Trees in Bloom (1936), and The Broad Dnieper Roars and Moans (1941).

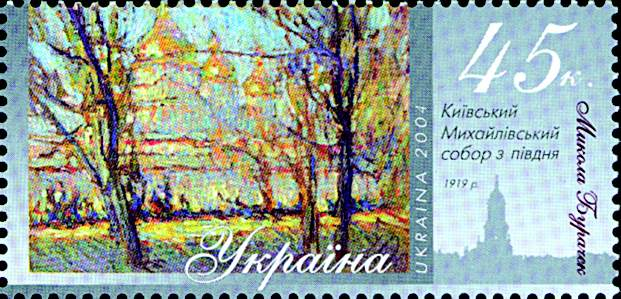
In 2004 Ukrainian Post issued a stamp based on Burachek's 1919 painting of St. Michael's Golden-Domed Cathedral

== Writings ==
Burachek also worked as a writer and art historian, among his works are:

- Moie zhyttia (My Life, 1937),
- Yuriy Dujenko. Mykola Burachek. Kyiv, Mistectvo, 1967.
- Velykyi narodnyi khudozhnyk (The Great National Artist, 1939, a monograph on Taras Shevchenko),
- Essays about Oleksander Murashko, Mykola Samokysh, Serhii Vasylkivsky, Mykhailo Zhuk, and other artists.

== Selected paintings ==
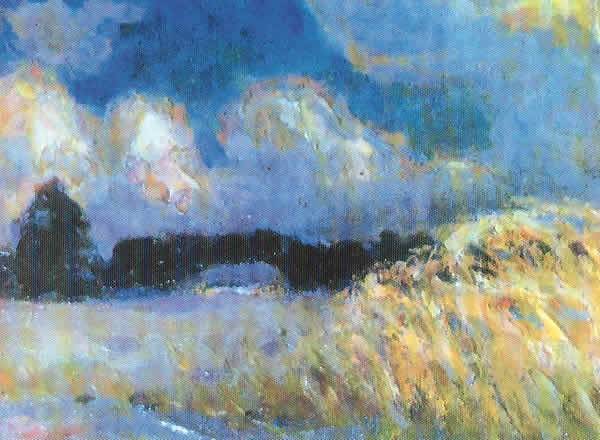
Before the Thunderstorm (1929)

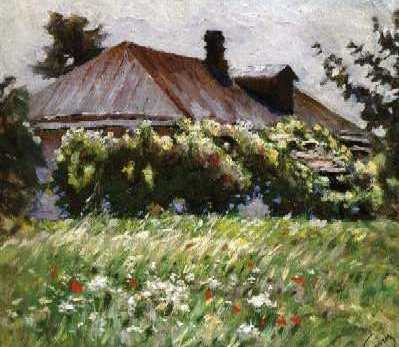
Summer Day. The Backyard.

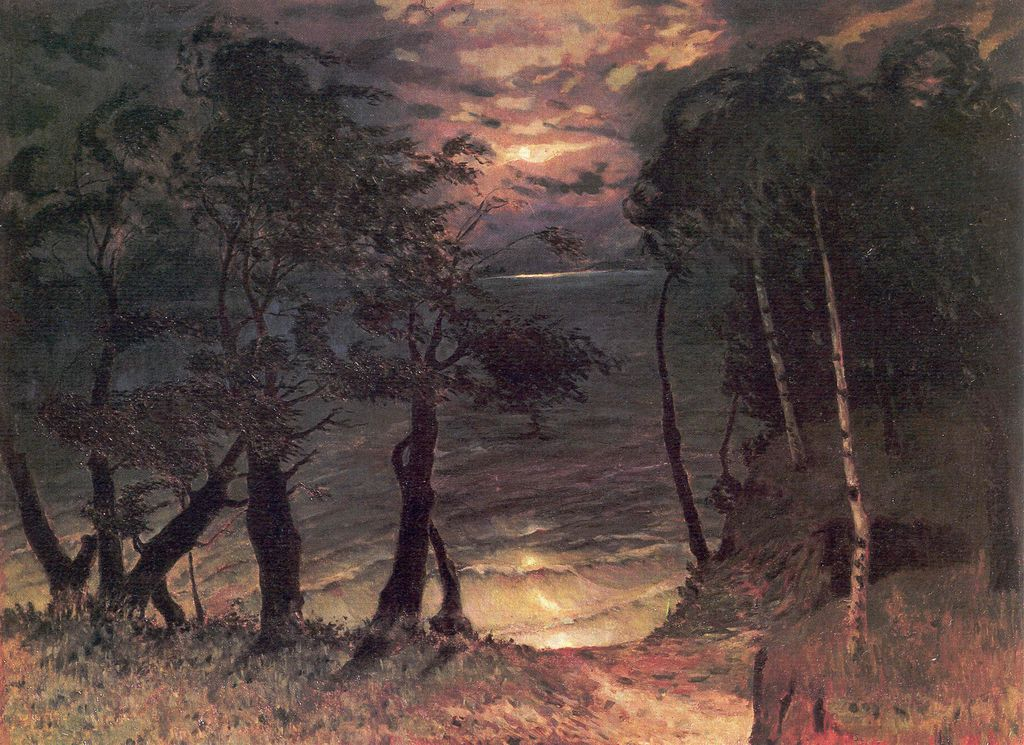
The Broad Dnieper Roars and Moans (1941)

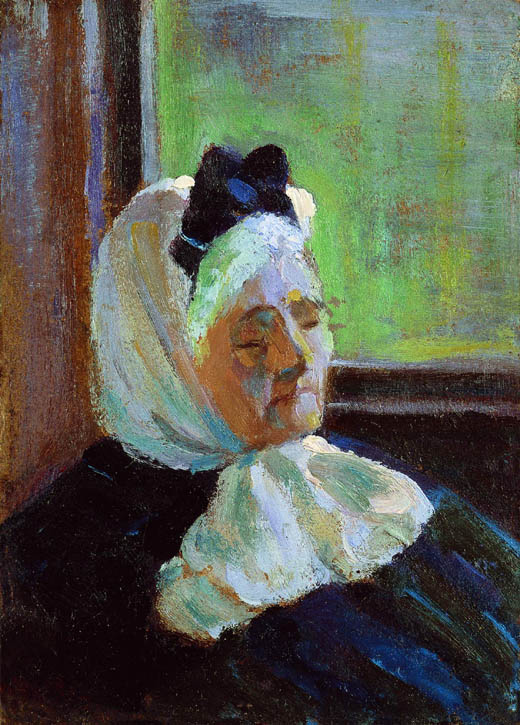
An Old Woman.
