= Mykhailo Zhuk =

Ukrainian professor and artist (1883–1964)

Mykhailo Ivanovych Zhuk
- Михайло Іванович Жук
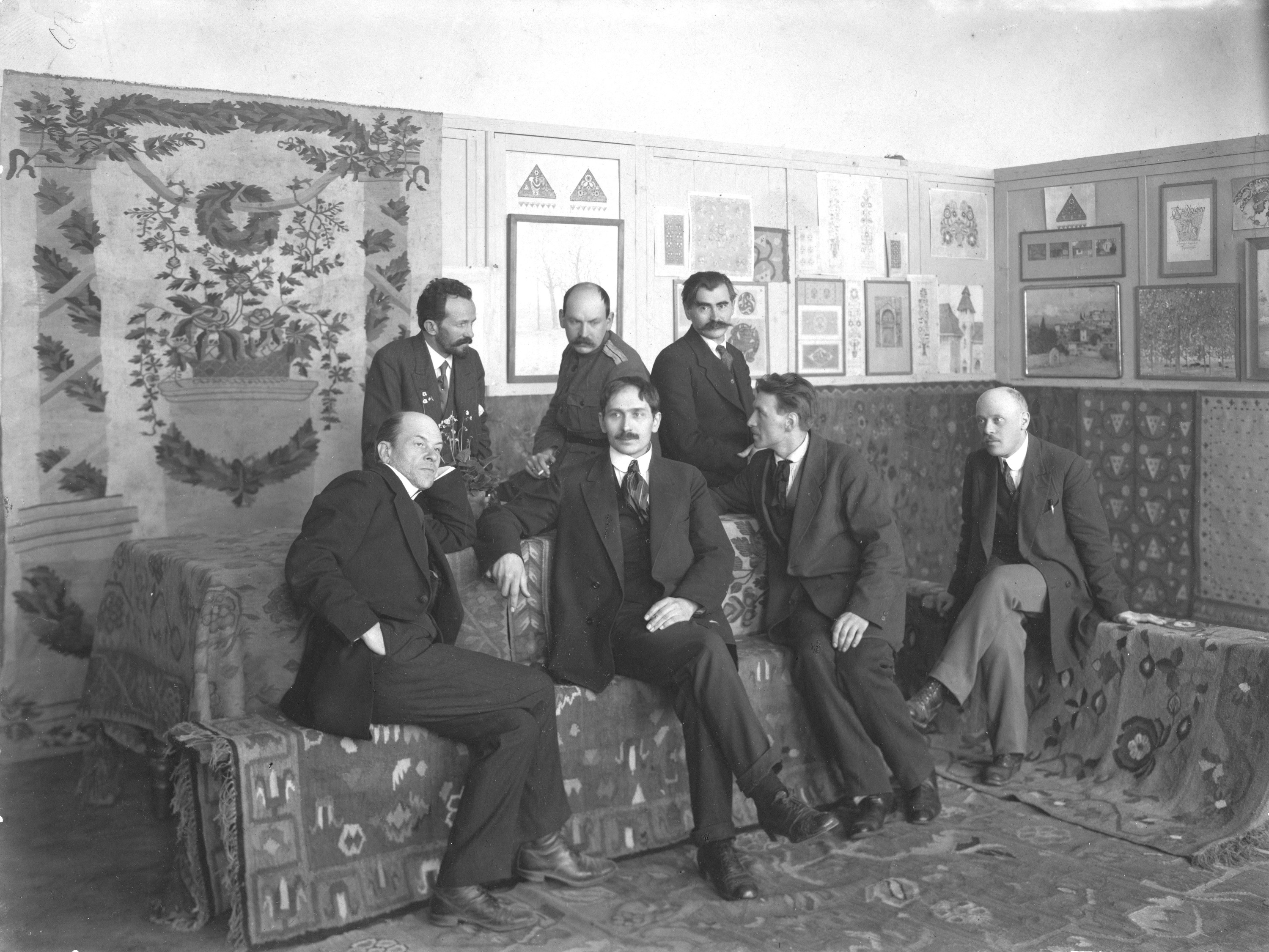
- Zhuk in a portrait from 1917 (far right).
- Born: 2 October 1883; Kakhovka, Taurida Governorate, Russian Empire
- Died: 7 July 1964 (aged 80); Odesa, Ukrainian SSR, Soviet Union
- Resting place: Second Christian Cemetery; 46.4508°N 30.725°E
- Education: Kyiv Drawing School; Moscow School of Painting, Sculpture and Architecture
- Alma mater: Jan Matejko Academy of Fine Arts
- Occupations: Professor, graphic artist, painter, ceramicist

Mykhailo Zhuk (also transliterated as Mikhail Zhuk; 2 October 1883 – 7 June 1964) was a Ukrainian professor and artist who worked in a variety of things like graphic art, painting, and ceramics. He was part of the founding faculty of National Academy of Visual Arts and Architecture and worked for the Grekov Odesa Art School for three decades. His art commonly combined national motifs with Art Deco and Art Nouveau.

Born in Kakhovka into the family of a painter, he studied at three different schools before finally graduating in 1904 at the Jan Matejko Academy of Fine Arts. From 1905 to 1917 he worked in Chernihiv as a drawing teacher at a gymnasium and seminary, before moving back to Kyiv and becoming one of the founding faculty of the National Academy of Visual Arts and Architecture as a professor of painting. However, after the start of the absorption of the Ukrainian People's Republic during the Russian Civil War, Zhuk moved back to Chernihiv in 1919, where he painted portraits as he was not able to get employment. He moved to Odesa in 1925 to support his family, becoming employed as a professor at the Grekov Odesa Art School where he worked for the following three decades. He died in 1964.

== Early life ==
Zhuk was born on 2 October 1883 in the city of Kakhovka, which was part of the Taurida Governorate in the Russian Empire at the time of his birth. His father was a master painter that lived near the Dnieper. After the age of eight, he started doing seasonal work at Dnieper, peeling bark from logs for rafts. The following year, when he was 9, he started painting fences with the local painting master Melikhov, painting signs and images, and drawing parquet floors. In 1896 he started studying at the Kyiv Drawing School under artist Oleksandr Murashko. He transferred schools in 1899 to go to the Moscow School of Painting, Sculpture and Architecture so he could study under Valentin Serov and Konstantin Korovin. However, he soon struggled due to the strictly regulated way of teaching, and again moved schools in 1900. He moved to Jan Matejko Academy of Fine Arts, where he graduated from in 1904. He received two silver medals for his graduation, and was also given a stipend to tour Italy and learn about the techniques used there. During his time at the academy, he also became heavily influenced by artist Stanisław Wyspiański's works after having studied under Józef Mehoffer, Jan Stanisławski, and Leon Wyczółkowski.

== Career ==
In 1905 he moved from Kyiv, where he had been living after he graduated, to Chernihiv to became a drawing teacher simultaneously at a private women's gymnasium and the Chernihiv Theological Seminary at the age of 22. At the theological school he taught Pavlo Tychyna, who later on composed the lyrics for the Anthem of the Ukrainian Soviet Socialist Republic. In 1917 he moved back to Kyiv and became one of the founding faculty of the National Academy of Visual Arts and Architecture as a professor of painting while also publishing in the magazine "Muzaget". However, in 1919 the absorption of the Ukrainian People's Republic during the Russian Civil War started, and opposed to the change of power he moved back to Chernihiv.

From 1919 to 1925 he stopped working as a professor. Instead, he was a freelancer and painted portraits for Ukrainian cultural figures because he could not find a job in the city except clerical work, which he did not like. During this time he produced the portraits of Tychyna and Les Kurbas, which incorporated cubo-futurist faceting of surfaces. Desperate for actual work, in 1923 he wrote to Vlas Chubar, the Chairman of the Council of People's Commissars of the Ukrainian SSR, saying he needed the opportunity to work and stated otherwise he would emigrate for his family, at first to the United States to an area with other Ukrainian Americans.

After not finding any work, he moved to Odesa in 1925 to work at the Grekov Odesa Art School. He worked there until 1955 without break as the teacher of drawing, graphics, and ceramics at the school.

== Works ==
He commonly reinterpreted folk art and combined with the characteristics of Art Deco and Art Nouveau in his art. For the majority of his life his work included graphic panels, painting dishes, portraits, and the design of books. In the 1930s, when socialist realism was the dominant style in the Soviet Union, he actively disagreed with the art style and instead changed his specialization to decorative and applied arts. He commonly painted flowers in watercolor at that point, but after becoming bedridden near the end of his life he started writing memoirs and poems about Odesa and the sea.

== Death ==
At the age of 80, he died on 7 June 1964 in Odesa after a serious illness.

== Honours and awards ==
In 2016 the former Sverdlov Street in Kakhovka, where he was born, was renamed to Mykhailo Zhuk Street in his honour. In September 2018 in Kakhovka a memorial plaque was unveiled at the house where he was born. Later on, in June 2021, the Kakhovka City Council launched the Mykhailo Zhuk Prize for literature, local history, and art.
