= Fedir Krychevsky =

Ukrainian painter (1879–1947)

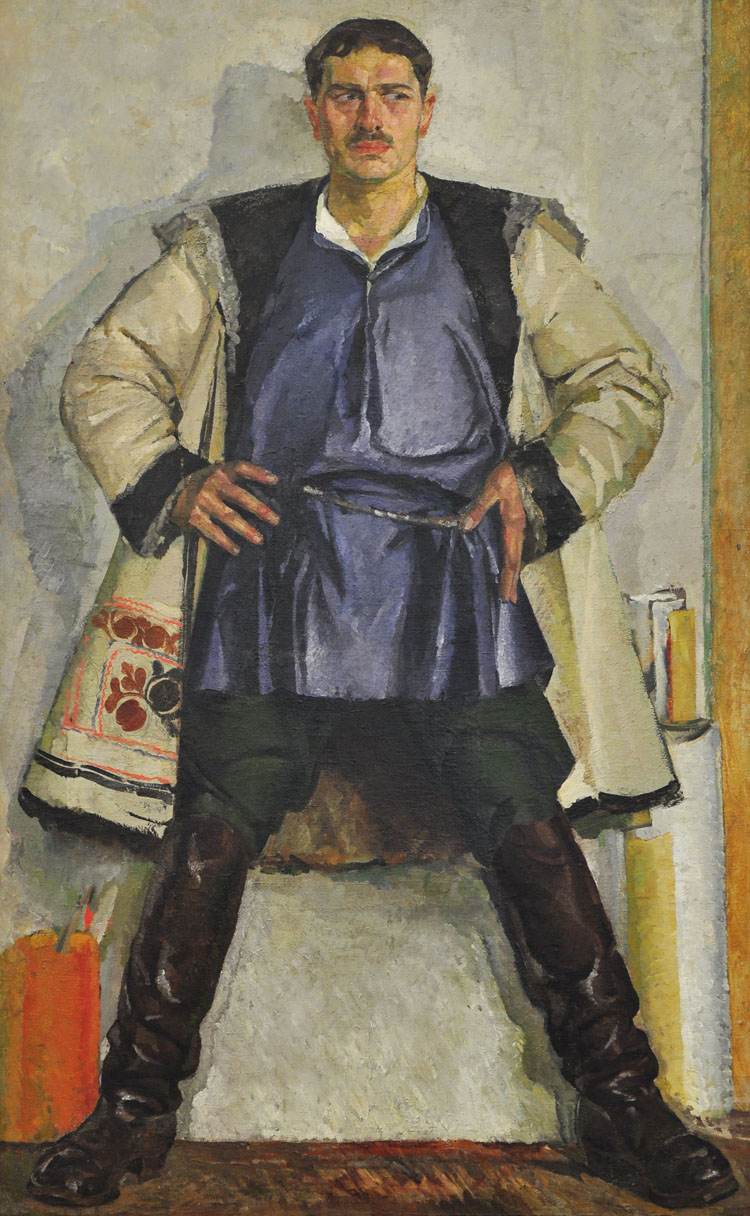
- Self portrait, 1923-24
- Born: 22 May [O.S. 10 May] 1879; Lebedyn, Kharkov Governorate, Russian Empire (now Ukraine)
- Died: July 30, 1947; Irpin, Ukrainian SSR, Soviet Union (now Ukraine)
- Occupation: Painter

Fedir Hryhorovych Krychevsky (Ukrainian: Федір Григорович Кричевський; 22 May [O.S. 10 May] 1879– July 30, 1947) was a Ukrainian early modernist painter. He was the brother of graphic designer Vasyl Krychevsky.

== Biography ==
Krychevsky was born in Lebedyn, in the Kharkov Governorate of the Russian Empire, to the family of a Jewish country doctor who converted to Orthodox Christianity and married a Ukrainian woman. He graduated from the Moscow School of Painting, Sculpture and Architecture in 1901 and the Saint Petersburg Academy of Arts in 1910.

In 1911-12 Krychevsky visited the main art centres of Western Europe, studying the masterpieces of world art housed in the museums of Germany, Austria, France and Italy.

He moved to Kyiv, where he served as professor and director at the Kyiv Art School from 1914 to 1918.

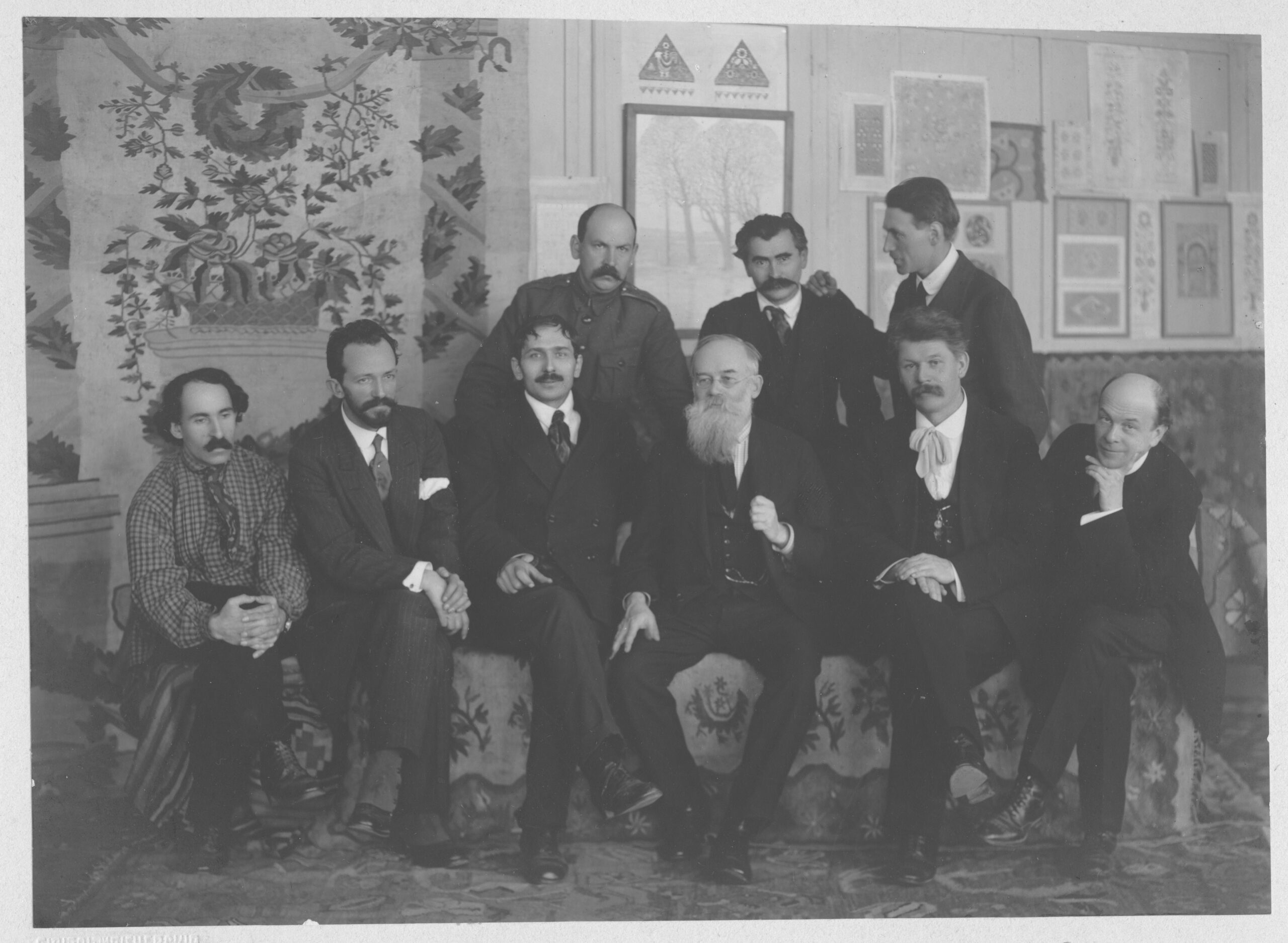
Founders of the Ukrainian academy of arts, 1917: Sitting: Abram Manevich, Oleksandr Murashko, Fedir Krychevsky, Mykhailo Hrushevsky, Ivan Steshenko, Mykola Burachek. Standing: Heorhiy Narbut, Vasyl Krychevsky, Mykhailo Boychuk.

In 1917, he was one of the founders and a rector (from 1920 to 1922) of the Ukrainian State Academy of Arts. When the academy was abolished, he worked as a professor at the Kyiv State Art Institute, eventually becoming its rector. He remained in Kyiv at the onset of the Second World War, and kept his position at the institute, trying to save it in difficult conditions during the German occupation of Kyiv. He served as the chairman of the Union of Ukrainian Artists that tried to improve the conditions of artists during the occupation. He was extremely popular among the artist-colleagues, faculty at the institute and the students, and no one betrayed his Jewish origins to the German authorities, saving him from the Babi Yar massacre.

He moved to Königsberg in the summer of 1943, to join his brother Vasyl. He attempted to flee west to escape the advancing Soviet troops, but the train in which he was traveling was overtaken. Krychevsky was arrested by the NKVD as a collaborator, but his interrogations have elicited nothing that could incriminate him, so he was stripped of all his titles and honors and sent to exile to the village of Irpin near Kyiv where he died of starvation during the famine in 1947, despite the food help that was receiving from his student Tetyana Yablonska.

Twelve years after his death Krychevsky was rehabilitated. In 1959 the first exhibition of his works was held in Kyiv, and information about his work began to be published.

== Works ==
In total, he produced close to a thousand works, including narrative compositions, portraits, landscapes, drawings. His early work remains the most valuable and appreciated part of his oeuvre. It was formed under the influence of Gustav Klimt and Ferdinand Hodler and combined Secessionist aesthetic principles with folk and Icon sensibilities. Krychevsky's draftsmanship is considered to be equal to that of Adolph Menzel. His later work, although solid in execution, suffered from ideological constraints of Socialist Realism.

For 30 years, Krychevsky was one of the leading figures in Ukrainian art. In 1911 and 1913 he organized the first strictly Ukrainian art exhibitions. Beginning in 1897, his work was exhibited at over 34 shows in and outside Ukraine. He was also a successful teacher, whose students included many famous Ukrainian artists.

Krychevsky's triptych "Life" remains one of the iconic examples of Ukrainian modernism. The work combines the elements Art Nouveau and Ukrainian Religious paintings. Each painting contains respectively eternal themes of life — love, achievement and loss. Krychevsky's modern touch to the pictures, like planar-linear rhythm and harmony of colors, enriched the paintings' classical interpretation.

Self-portrait, 1923–24

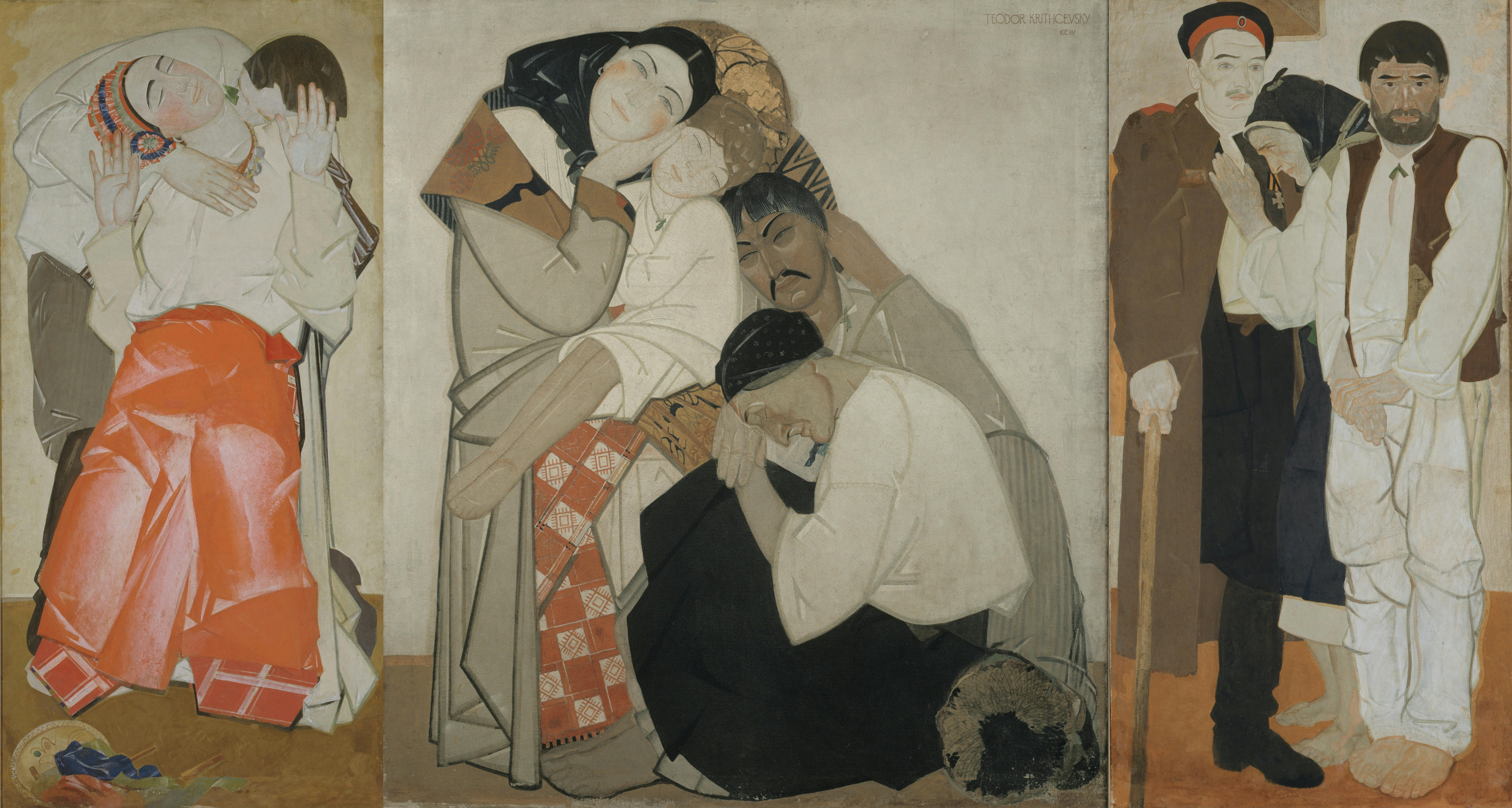
Life triptych, 1925–29

== Influence ==
Krychevsky had many students throughout his long career, notably Boris Kriukow and Tetyana Yablonska.

There is a street in Kyiv named in his honor.
