= List of Ukrainian cultural figures persecuted by the Soviet Union =

This article contains an incomplete list of those Ukrainian cultural figures who were persecuted and repressed by Soviet Russia and subsequently by the Soviet Union. The list is sorted by date of death.

== List ==
Portrait	Name	Name in Ukrainian	Date of birth	Date of death	Activity	Repression
	Oleksandr Borodai	Олександр Бородай	1844	1919	Bandurist and engineer	Execution
	Oleksandr Murashko	Олександр Мурашко	September 7, 1875	June 14, 1919	Painter and educator	Murder
	Olelko Ostrovsky	Олелько Островський	August 6, 1887	July 6, 1919	Actor, director, writer and playwright	Execution
	Oleksiy Ivanytsky	Олексій Іваницький	1854	December 6, 1920	Photographer	Shot by the Cheka
	Antin Mytyai	Антін Митяй	1886	1921	Bandurist	Shot
	Mykola Leontovych	Микола Леонтович	December 13, 1877	January 23, 1921	Composer, choir conductor and teacher	Murdered by the Cheka
	Arkady Kazka	Аркадій Казка	September 23, 1890	November 23, 1929	Poet, translator and educator	Imprisonment by the NKWD
	Pavlo Kolomiets	Павло Коломієць	1900	November 10, 1929	Poet	Suicide before arrest
	Mykola Khvylovy	Микола Хвильовий	December 13, 1893	May 13, 1933	Writer	Suicide in the context of Stalinist repression
	Petro Drevchenko	Петро Древченко	1863	1934	Kobzar	Execution
	Serhii Pylypenko	Сергій Пилипенко	July 22, 1891	March 3, 1934	Writer, journalist and literary critic	Execution
	Oleksa Vlyzko	Олекса Влизько	February 17, 1908	December 14, 1934	Poet, prose writer, Futurist	Execution
	Kost Bureviy	Кость Буревій	August 14, 1888	December 15, 1934	Poet, playwright, theatre scholar, literary critic and translator	Execution
	Dmytro Falkivskyj	Дмитро Фальківський	November 3, 1898	December 16, 1934	Poet, prose writer, translator, screenwriter	Execution
	Hryhorii Kosynka	Григорій Косинка	November 29, 1898	December 17, 1934	Writer, publicist and translator	Execution
	Ivan Krushelnytsky	Іван Крушельницький	November 12, 1905	December 17, 1934	Poet, playwright, graphic artist, art historian and literary critic	Execution
	Mykyta Kalistratenko	Микита Калістратенко	1900	November 1935	Choir conductor, folklorist and organizer of music radio broadcasts	Execution
	Borys Teneta	Борис Тенета	April 8, 1903	February 6, 1935	Poet and writer	Died in prison
	Pylyp Zahoruiko	Пилип Загоруйко	June 27, 1900	February 25, 1935	Writer	Execution
	Kazimir Malevich	Казимир Малевич	February 23, 1879	May 15, 1935	Painter	Arrested twice: one month in Lefortovo Prison, over two months in Kresty Prison
	Yukhym Mikhailiv	Юхим Михайлів	September 27, 1885	July 15, 1935	Artist, poet and art critic	Died in exile
	Yevhen Pluzhnyk	Євген Плужник	December 26, 1898	February 2, 1936	Writer	Died in a labor camp
	Ivan Lychko	Іван Личко	1882	1937	Writer	Died in the Gulag
	Mykhailo Domontovych	Михайло Домонтович	October 31, 1883	1937	Kobsar and writer	Execution
	Valentyn Shklyaiv	Валентин Шкляїв	1895	1937	Theatre artist, set designer	Arrested, fate unknown
	Petro Vanchenko-Ivaschenko	Петро Ванченко-Іващенко	January 11, 1898	March 10, 1937	Writer and actor	Died in the Gulag
	Lazar Shevchenko	Лазар Шевченко	November 6, 1879	April 7, 1937	Actor	Poisoned during NKVD interrogation
	Ladya Mohylyanska	Ладя Могилянська	November 7, 1899	June 6, 1937	Poet	Prisoner in the Gulag and execution
	Mykhailo Boychuk	Михайло Бойчук	October 30, 1882	July 13, 1937	Artist, teacher, founder of the school of Ukrainian monumental painting	Execution
	Ivan Lypkivsky	Іван Липківський	September 14, 1892	July 13, 1937	Painter	Execution
	Ivan Padalka	Іван Падалка	November 15, 1894	July 13, 1937	Artist and educator	Execution
	Ivan Orel-Orlenko	Іван Орел-Орленко	September 25, 1896	July 13, 1937	Painter	Execution
	Volodymyr Yaroshenko	Володимир Ярошенко	May 23, 1898	July 13, 1937	Poet, fabulist, prose writer, dramatist, literary critic, screenwriter	Execution
	Vasyl Sedlyar	Василь Седляр	April 12, 1899	July 13, 1937	Artist, teacher, art critic	Execution
	Vasyl Chechvansky	Василь Чечванський	March 11, 1888	July 15, 1937	Humorist	Execution
	Oleksiy Savytsky	Олексій Савицький	March 2, 1896	July 15, 1937	Writer, poet and dramatist	Execution
	Ivan Kalyannyk	Іван Калянник	March 12, 1911	July 15, 1937	Writer, poet and translator	Execution
	Vyatcheslav Potapenko	В'ячеслав Потапенко	January 2, 1864	August 8, 1937	Writer and actor	Execution
	Oleksiy Arnautoff	Олексій Арнаутов	January 12, 1907	September 3, 1937	Composer	Execution
	Mykola Bulatovych	Микола Булатович	February 14, 1909	September 3, 1937	Poet	Execution
	Fawst Lopatynsky	Фавст Лопатинський	May 29, 1899	September 3, 1937	Director, screenwriter, actor	Execution
	Vasyl Mykoliuk	Василь Миколюк	March 8, 1904	September 24, 1937	Writer	Execution
	Liuziana Piontek	Люзіана Піонтек	July 1, 1899	September 25, 1937	Writer and poet	Execution
	Petro Svashchenko (Petro Lisovy)	Петро Свашенко (Петро Лісовий)	June 22, 1891	September 27, 1937	Writer and journalist	Execution
	Ivan Mykytenko	Іван Микитенко	September 6, 1897	October 4, 1937	Writer and dramatist	Execution
	Ivan Kulyk	Іван Кулик	January 26, 1897	October 10, 1937	Writer, poet and translator	Execution
	Leonid Obosnenko	Леонід Обосненко	April 12, 1884	October 19, 1937	Painter	Execution
	Oleksandr Pevny	Олександр Певний	1881	October 22, 1937	Actor and singer	Execution
	Mykhailo Semenko	Михайло Семенко	December 31, 1892	October 23, 1937	Poet, founder of Ukrainian Futurism	Execution
	Mykhailo Bykovets	Михайло Биковець	September 15, 1894	October 24, 1937	Writer, literary critic, educator and journalist	Execution
	Mykola Skuba	Микола Скуба	December 19, 1907	October 24, 1937	Poet	Execution
	Victor Hudym	Віктор Гудим	July 1, 1909	October 24, 1937	Writer and journalist	Execution
	Andriy Mychailyuk	Андрій Михайлюк	December 19, 1911	October 24, 1937	Poet and translator	Execution
	Dmytro Hrudyna	Дмитро Грудина	1893	October 25, 1937	Theater critic, writer, actor	Execution
	Anatoly Patyak	Анатолій Патяк	February 19, 1898	October 25, 1937	Writer and playwright	Execution
	Ivan Yanovsky	Іван Яновський	September 23, 1898	October 26, 1937	Theater practitioner, director of the Kyiv Academic Opera and Ballet Theatre	Execution
	Maik Yohansen	Майк Йохансен	October 28, 1895	October 27, 1937	Poet, adventure writer	Execution
	Hryhorii Kovalenko	Григорій Коваленко	January 24, 1868	October 28, 1937	Writer, journalist, historian, ethnographer, painter	Murdered in prison
	Kostiantyn Krzheminsky	Костянтин Кржемінський	May 11, 1893	October 28, 1937	Artist, architect, art historian, educator, restorer and researcher	Execution
	Stepan Ben	Степан Бен	October 29, 1900	November 1, 1937	Poet	Execution
	Yakiv Savchenko	Яків Савченко	April 2, 1890	November 2, 1937	Poet, literary critic and essayist	Execution
	Oleksiy Rublevsky	Олексій Рубльовський	1904	November 2, 1937	Writer	Execution
	Mykhailo Lozynsky	Михайло Лозинський	June 30, 1880	November 3, 1937	Writer, translator, biographer, literary and theatre critic	Execution
	Mychailo Kozoris	Михайло Козоріс	March 2, 1882	November 3, 1937	Writer, poet, fabulist and publicist	Execution
	Les Kurbas	Лесь Курбас	February 25, 1887	November 3, 1937	Director, actor, founder of the Ukrainian national modern theatre	Execution
	Mychailo Kachaniuk	Михайло Качанюк	1889	November 3, 1937	Writer	Execution
	Mykola Zerov	Микола Зеров	April 26, 1890	November 3, 1937	Literary critic, translator of ancient poetry	Execution
	Oleksa Slisarenko	Олекса Слісаренко	March 28, 1891	November 3, 1937	Poet and writer	Execution
	Pavlo Fylypovych	Павло Филипович	September 1, 1891	November 3, 1937	Writer, literary critic and translator	Execution
	Klym Polishchuk	Клим Поліщук	November 25, 1891	November 3, 1937	Writer and publicist	Execution
	Borys Pylypenko	Борис Пилипенко	July 16, 1892	November 3, 1937	Painter	Execution
	Dmytro Rovynsky	Дмитро Ровинський	November 8, 1892	November 3, 1937	Actor, theatre director	Execution
	Mykola Kulish	Микола Куліш	December 18, 1892	November 3, 1937	Writer, director, playwright	Execution
	Volodymyr Shtanhei	Володимир Штанхей	1895	November 3, 1937	Writer	Execution
	Mychailo Yalovy	Михайло Яловий	June 5, 1895	November 3, 1937	Poet, short story writer and playwright	Execution
	Myroslav Irchan	Мирослав Ірчан	July 14, 1897	November 3, 1937	Poet, prose writer, playwright, translator, literary critic, journalist, historian, publisher	Execution
	Valerian Polishchuk	Валерій Поліщук	October 1, 1897	November 3, 1937	Writer, literary critic, literary theorist, publicist	Execution
	Andrii Paniv	Андрій Панів	September 30, 1899	November 3, 1937	Poet, journalist, translator	Execution
	Hryhorii Epik	Григорій Епік	January 17, 1901	November 3, 1937	Journalist, translator, writer	Execution
	Valerian Pidmohylny	Валерій Підмогильний	February 2, 1901	November 3, 1937	Writer, translator	Execution
	Marko Vorony	Марко Вороний	March 18, 1904	November 3, 1937	Poet, translator	Execution
	Ivan Borets	Іван Борець	1900	November 11, 1937	Kobzar	Execution
	Dmytro Buzko	Дмитро Бузько	1891	November 14, 1937	Poet, writer	Execution
	Vitalii Chyhyryn	Віталій Чигирин	May 11, 1908	November 15, 1937	Writer	Execution
	Oleksandr Kosenko	Олександр Косенко	March 19, 1904	November 15, 1937	Poet, writer	Execution
	Nykanor Onatsky	Никанор Онацький	January 9, 1874	November 23, 1937	Painter, poet, teacher, art critic, founder of the Sumy Art Museum	Arrest and execution
	Ivan Kuchuhura-Kucherenko	Іван Кучугура-Кучеренко	July 7, 1878	November 24, 1937	Kobzar, activist	Execution
	Kostiantyn Bohuslavsky	Костянтин Богуславський	May 21, 1895	November 24, 1937	Composer, singer, choirmaster	Execution
	Mykola Ivasyuk	Микола Івасюк	March 28, 1865	November 25, 1937	Painter, graphic artist	Execution
	Ivan Malovytschko	Іван Маловичко	November 7, 1909	November 26, 1937	Poet	Execution
	Vasyl Lypkivsky	Василь Липківський	March 19, 1880	November 27, 1937	Education activist, reformer, journalist, writer, and translator	Execution
	Victor Solohub	Віктор Сологуб	1888	November 27, 1937	Bandurist	Execution
	Myroslava Sopilka	Мирослава Сопілка	August 29, 1897	November 28, 1937	Poet and writer	Execution
	Yakiv Strukhmanchuk	Яків Струхманчук	August 10, 1884	December 2, 1937	Graphic artist, caricaturist, and portraitist	Execution
	Mykola Lyubchenko (Kost Kotko)	Микола Любченко (Кость Котко)	February 26, 1896	December 8, 1937	Writer and journalist	Execution
	Ivan Andrienko	Іван Андрієнко	1897	December 8, 1937	Writer	Execution
	Vitaly Snizhny	Віталій Сніжний	May 7, 1898	December 8, 1937	Writer and poet	Execution
	Vasyl Vrazhlyvy	Василь Вражливий	1903	December 8, 1937	Writer	Execution
	Sofiya Nalepinska-Boychuk	Софія Налепинська-Бойчук	July 30, 1884	December 11, 1937	Artist and graphic artist	Execution
	Adam Babiy	Адам Бабій	December 19, 1897	December 11, 1937	Conductor and musicologist	Execution
	Kyrylo Korshak	Кирило Коршак	May 12, 1897	December 22, 1937	Poet and archaeologist	Execution
	Hryhoriy Kontsevych	Григорій Концевич	November 17, 1863	December 26, 1937	Choir director, composer, and ethnographer	Execution
	Panteleimon Peda	Пантелеймон Педа	December 23, 1907	December 27, 1937	Poet and translator	Execution
	Antin Dykyi	Антін Дикий	August 1, 1900	December 31, 1937	Writer	Execution
	Denys Halushka	Денис Галушка	May 30, 1902	December 31, 1937	Writer	Execution
	Oleksandr Horily	Олександр Горілий	September 14, 1863	after 1937	Composer, conductor	Arrested by NKVD, fate unknown
	Heorhiy Krushevsky	Георгій Крушевський	April 19, 1863	1938	Painter	Execution
	Ivan Krashanovsky	Іван Крашановський	1884	1938	Painter	Died in labor camp
	Vasyl Potapenko	Василь Потапенко	1886	1938	Bandurist	Detained by NKVD
	Yona Shevchenko	Йона Шевченко	April 26, 1887	1938	Theater critic, theater scholar, and actor of the Les Kurbas school	Execution
	Serhiy Karhalsky	Сергій Каргальський	1889	1938	Actor and director	Execution
	Jury Shylko	Юрій Шилко	February 28, 1898	1938	Poet, journalist, and educator	Execution
	Marko Kozhushny	Марко Кожушний	May 8, 1904	1938	Singer-songwriter and journalist	Execution
	Mykola Sasym	Микола Сасим	1910	1938	Film director	Execution
	Maksym Korostash	Максим Коросташ	?	January 2, 1938	Musician, educator, composer, and collector of folk folklore	Imprisoned
	Vasyl Bobynsky	Василь Бобинський	March 11, 1898	January 2, 1938	Writer, journalist, and translator	Execution in the Gulag
	Dmytro Akhsharumov	Дмитро Ахшарумов	September 20, 1864	January 3, 1938	Violinist, composer, music educator, and conductor	Died in prison
	Oleksii Khodymchuk	Олексій Ходимчук	March 17, 1896	January 4, 1938	Actor and director	Execution
	Mykola Veresa	Микола Вереса	December 22, 1894	January 8, 1938	Bandurist	Execution
	Mykola Filyansky	Микола Філянський	December 19, 1873	January 12, 1938	Poet, writer, and geologist	Execution
	Onopry Turhan	Онопрій Турган	1900	January 15, 1938	Poet and writer	Execution
	Januariy Bortnyk	Януарій Бортник	May 3, 1897	January 16, 1938	Actor and director	Execution
	Fedir Mazulenko	Федір Мазуленко	February 26, 1882	January 17, 1938	Architect	Execution
	Mykola Chernyavsky	Микола Чернявський	January 3, 1868	January 19, 1938	Poet, teacher, and zemstvo activist	Execution
	Maksym Lebid	Максим Лебідь	November 24, 1899	January 19, 1938	Writer	Execution
	Volodymyr Hahenmeister	Володимир Гагенмейстер	June 30, 1887	January 20, 1938	Painter, graphic artist, illustrator, teacher, art critic, and publisher	Execution
	Stepan Shahaida	Степан Шагайда	January 9, 1896	January 20, 1938	Theater and film actor	Execution
	Dmytro Tas	Дмитро Тась	January 28, 1901	February 28, 1938	Writer, poet, journalist, and translator	Execution
	Hryhory Bahlyuk	Григорій Баглюк	January 5, 1905	March 1, 1938	Writer	Execution
	Meletiy Kitchura	Мелетій Кічура	January 21, 1881	March 3, 1938	Lawyer, writer, literary critic, and translator	Died in the Gulag
	Vasyl Vorusky	Василь Воруський	1902	March 22, 1938	Writer	Execution
	Nykyfor Chumak	Никифор Чумак	1892	March 23, 1938	Bandurist and painter	Execution
	Mykola Krutko	Микола Крутько	1899	March 23, 1938	Bandurist	Execution
	Dmytro Salata	Дмитро Салата	1900	April 5, 1938	Bandurist	Execution
	Vasyl Verkhovynets	Василь Верховинець	January 5, 1880	April 11, 1938	Composer, conductor, and choreographer; first theorist of Ukrainian folk dance	Execution
	Fedir Doroshko	Федір Дорошко	1882?	April 21, 1938	Kobzar and bandurist	Execution
	Heorhii Kopan	Георгій Копан	January 4, 1887	April 28, 1938	Bandurist	Execution
	Mykola Kasperovych	Микола Касперович	1885	May 7, 1938	Painter and restorer	Execution
	Pylyp Kapelhorodsky	Пилип Капельгородський	November 26, 1882	May 19, 1938	Writer	Execution
	Mykola Voronyi	Микола Вороний	December 6, 1871	June 7, 1938	Writer, translator, poet, director, actor, theater critic	Execution
	Kost Slipko-Moskaltsiv	Кость Сліпко-Москальців	1901	June 10, 1938	Painter and art historian	Execution
	Serhii Zhyhalko	Сергій Жигалко	October 6, 1902	June 21, 1938	Writer	Execution
	Borys Danylevskyi	Борис Данилевський	April 22, 1900	July 29, 1938	Bandurist	Execution
	Oleksandr Sokolovsky	Олександр Соколовський	September 8, 1896	August 22, 1938	Writer	Execution
	Borys Drobynsky	Борис Дробинський	1904	September 2, 1938	Actor and director	Execution
	Veronika Chernyakhivska	Вероніка Черняхівська	April 25, 1900	September 22, 1938	Poet and translator	Execution
	Ivan Kyrylenko	Іван Кириленко	December 2, 1903	September 23, 1938	Writer	Execution
	Viktor Kosenko	Віктор Косенко	November 23, 1896	October 3, 1938	Composer, teacher and pianist	Works banned from sale and performance
	Hnat Khotkevych	Гнат Хоткевич	January 12, 1877	October 8, 1938	Bandurist, composer and musicologist	Execution
	Vasyl Basok	Василь Басок	April 22, 1906	October 8, 1938	Poet, lyricist, translator, journalist	Died in the Gulag
	Hordii Kotsiuba	Гордій Коцюба	January 14, 1892	December 17, 1938	Writer	Execution
	Illia Shulha	Ілля Шульга	July 20, 1878	December 19, 1938	Painter	Died in prison
	Dmytro Borsiak	Дмитро Борсяк	October 25, 1897	1939	Writer	Died in the Gulag
	Mykhailo Drai-Khmara	Михайло Драй-Хмара	October 10, 1889	January 19, 1939	Poet	Died in the Gulag
	Mykola Pevny	Микола Певний	January 23, 1885	1940	Actor and director	Execution
	Yurii Nikitin	Юрій Нікітін	January 4, 1905	1940	Actor and director	Died in the Gulag
	Vasyl Khmuryi	Василь Хмурий	February 8, 1896	January 27, 1940	Journalist, art historian and theatre critic	Died in the Gulag
	Petro Shekeryk-Donykiv	Петро Шекерик-Доників	April 20, 1889	after 1940	Ethnographer, writer and politician	Died in the Gulag
	Liudmyla Starytska-Cherniakhivska	Людмила Старицька-Черняхівська	August 29, 1868	1941	Writer, translator and critic	Died during deportation
	Fedir Zlyden	Федір Злидень	August 5, 1899	1941	Writer and journalist	Died in the Gulag
	Luka Konopa	Лука Конопа	1896	June 29, 1941	Conductor, violinist	Execution
	Mykhailo Dubovyk	Михайло Дубовик	December 29, 1900	July 7, 1941	Poet	Execution
	Mykhailo Donets	Михайло Донець	January 22, 1883	September 10, 1941	Opera singer	Execution
	Ostap Lutsky	Остап Луцький	November 8, 1883	October 8, 1941	Writer, publicist and literary critic	Died in the Gulag
	Oleksandr Soroka	Олександр Сорока	December 19, 1901	October 12, 1941	Poet and translator	Execution
	Volodymyr Svidzynsky	Володимир Свідзінський	October 8, 1885	October 18, 1941	Poet	Execution
	Oksana Steshenko	Оксана Стешенко	January 24, 1875	1942	Children's writer and translator	Died in the Gulag
	Oleksii Marenkov	Олексій Маренков	March 25, 1886	1942	Graphic artist	Persecution
	Vasyl Oleshko	Василь Олешко	February 12, 1889	1942	Writer, poet and playwright	Imprisoned by NKVD
	Ahatanhel Krymskyi	Ахатангель Кримський	January 15, 1871	January 25, 1942	Writer, orientalist	Persecution, publication ban, died in exile
	Mykhailo Pronchenko	Михайло Пронченко	September 7, 1909	February 11, 1942	Poet	Imprisonment in the Gulag
	Mykola Damilovsky	Микола Даміловський	December 31, 1880	March 21, 1942	Architect	Imprisonment in Lukyanivska Prison and professional ban
	Dmytro Dyachenko	Дмитро Дяченко	June 14, 1887	May 21, 1942	Architect	Died in the Gulag
	Mykhailo Mohyliansky	Михайло Могилянський	December 4, 1873	March 22, 1942	Poet, literary critic and publicist	Exile
	Mykola Shpak	Микола Шпак	February 23, 1909	June 19, 1942	Writer, poet and translator	Execution
	Yurii Budiak	Юрій Будяк	1879	September 28, 1942	Writer	Imprisonment in the Gulag
	Danylo Shcherbyna	Данило Щербина	1891	1943	Bandurist	Arrests and exile to Siberia
	Vyacheslav Rozvadovsky	В'ячеслав Розвадовський	September 12, 1875	January 18, 1943	Painter	Arrest, died in prison
	Olena Shpota	Олена Шпота	May 25, 1899	February 3, 1943	Writer	Arrest
	Oleksandr Ruban	Олександр Рубан	May 16, 1900	June 11, 1943	Graphic artist	Arrest
	Volodymyr Kuzmych	Володимир Кузьмич	June 27, 1904	October 4, 1943	Writer	Death in the Gulag
	Mykola Dukyn	Микола Дикун	December 21, 1905	October 10, 1943	Writer and translator	Death in the Gulag
	Ivan Semyvolos	Іван Семиволос	October 28, 1909	December 17, 1943	Poet	Death in the Gulag
	Dmytro Zahul	Дмитро Загул	August 28, 1890	1944	Poet	Death in the Gulag
	Hordii Brasyuk	Гордій Брасюк	January 2, 1899	1944	Writer and screenwriter	Imprisonment and labor camp
	Vasyl Trusch-Koval	Василь Труш-Коваль	December 20, 1905	January 11, 1944	Poet	Death in the Gulag
	Leonid Lupan	Леонід Лупан	October 25, 1915	January 16, 1944	Writer	Death in the Gulag
	Dmytro Chepurny	Дмитро Чепурний	October 25, 1908	June 2, 1944	Poet and playwright	10 years imprisonment, death in prison
	Yurii Lypa	Юрій Липа	May 5, 1900	August 20, 1944	Writer, poet, journalist, physician	Murdered by NKVD
	Nikolai Roslavets	Микола Андрійович Рославець	January 4, 1881	August 23, 1944	Composer, music theorist, publicist, pedagogue and violinist	Professional ban
	Yakiv Yatsynevych	Яків Яциневич	November 8, 1869	April 25, 1945	Composer, conductor and ethnographer	Ban on works and professional activity
	Ivan Fylypchak	Іван Филипчак	January 27, 1871	October 21, 1945	Writer	Death in the Gulag
	Ivan Ivanets	Іван Іванець	January 9, 1893	March 10, 1946	Painter and graphic artist	Death in the Gulag
	Havrylo Pustoviyt	Гаврило Пустовіт	July 26, 1900	March 20, 1947	Artist	Imprisonment in the Gulag
	Sava Bozhko	Сава Божко	April 24, 1901	April 27, 1947	Writer	Imprisonment in the Gulag
	Fedir Krychevsky	Федір Кричевський	May 22, 1879	July 30, 1947	Artist	Imprisonment by SMERSH, exile
	Sofia Tereshchenko	Софія Терещенко	1887	1948	Painter and ethnographer	Nine years' imprisonment in a concentration camp
	Borys Kudryk	Борис Кудрик	June 10, 1897	March 28, 1952	Composer, musicologist, pedagogue, conductor, pianist-improviser, music critic	Death in the Gulag
	Halyna Mnevska	Галина Мневська	November 16, 1895	March 21, 1955	Actress, writer and translator	Five years' exile
	Ostap Vyshnya	Остап Вишня	November 13, 1889	September 28, 1956	Writer, humorist and satirist	Imprisonment in the Gulag
	Maria Tobilevych-Kresan	Марія Тобілевич-Кресан	December 19, 1883	October 1, 1957	Writer, translator, theater producer and lecturer in foreign languages	Exile to Siberia
	Les Homin	Лесь Гомін	March 30, 1900	January 16, 1958	Writer	Imprisonment and exile
	Volodymyr Kabachok	Володимир Кабачок	July 15, 1892	June 15, 1958	Bandurist, singer, conductor and teacher	Imprisonment in the Gulag
	Kesar Andriychuk	Кесар Андрійчук	March 22, 1907	August 7, 1958	Poet	10 years' imprisonment in the Gulag
	Pavlo Senytsya	Павло Сениця	September 23, 1879	July 3, 1960	Composer	Ban on the performance and publication of his works
	Valentyn Kostenko	Валентин Костенко	July 28, 1895	July 14, 1960	Composer	Imprisonment in the Gulag
	Teodos Osmachka	Теодосій Осмачка	July 15, 1895	September 7, 1962	Poet and writer	Imprisonment and persecution
	Vasyl Barvinsky	Василь Барвінський	February 20, 1888	June 9, 1963	Composer, pianist, music critic and conductor	Imprisonment in the Gulag
	Vasyl Symonenko	Василь Симоненко	January 8, 1935	December 13, 1963	Poet and writer	Serious bodily injury
	Boris Porai-Koshits	Борис Порай-Кошиць	1886	1964	Painter	Arrest and forced labor
	Ivan Severyn	Іван Северин	September 23, 1887	February 20, 1964	Painter	Imprisonment and exile
	Zinaida Rybchynska	Синайїда Рибчинська	February 16, 1885	April 8, 1964	Actress and opera singer	Repressed in 1937, no performances afterward
	Maksym Rylsky	Максим Рильський	March 19, 1895	July 24, 1964	Poet, translator and writer	Imprisonment by NKVD
	Zinaida Tulub	Синайїда Тулуб	November 28, 1890	September 26, 1964	Writer	Imprisonment in the Gulag
	Yuri Shkrumelyak	Юрій Шкрумеляк	April 18, 1895	October 16, 1965	Writer and poet	Imprisonment in the Gulag
	Konon Bezshchasny	Конон Безщасний	October 15, 1884	1967	Kobzar and bandurist	5 years' arrest
	Hryhori Vashchenko	Григорій Ващенко	April 23, 1878	May 2, 1967	Writer and pedagogue	Removal of professorial title
	Ivan Khomenko	Іван Хоменко	September 29, 1919	August 16, 1968	Poet	Imprisonment in the Gulag
	Olha Nesterenko	Ольга Нестеренко	1890	1969	Opera singer	3 years' arrest
	Ganna Kasyanenko	Ганна Касьяненко	November 5, 1891	May 9, 1969	Translator	Imprisonment in the Gulag
	Arkadi Dobrovolsky	Аркадій Добровольський	November 14, 1911	June 10, 1969	Writer, screenwriter and translator	Imprisonment in the Gulag
	Yury Slipko	Юрій Сліпко	May 26, 1912	October 5, 1969	Poet	Imprisonment in the Gulag
	Alla Horska	Алла Горська	September 18, 1929	November 28, 1970	Artist of the Sixtiers	Murder
	Pavlo Kononenko	Павло Кононенко	July 11, 1900	March 14, 1971	Writer and poet	Imprisonment in the Gulag
	Omelian Masliak	Омелян Масляк	January 19, 1893	June 19, 1972	Graphic artist and library scientist	Imprisonment in the Gulag
	Hryhori Hryhoryev	Григорій Григор’єв	September 18, 1929	November 13, 1972	Writer and screenwriter	Imprisonment in the Gulag
	Vasyl Haidarivsky	Василь Гайдарівський	January 14, 1906	November 13, 1972	Writer	Exile
	Dmytro Hordienko	Дмитро Гордієнко	December 8, 1901	January 1, 1974	Writer	Imprisonment in the Gulag
	Mykyta Hodovanets	Микита Годованець	September 26, 1893	July 27, 1974	Fabulist	Exile
	Ivan Vyrhan	Іван Вирган	June 1, 1908	January 12, 1975	Poet and translator	Imprisonment in the Gulag
	Kostyantyn Kozlovsky	Костянтин Козловський	June 3, 1906	March 7, 1975	Graphic artist	Imprisonment in the Gulag
	Ivan Bahmut	Іван Багмут	June 7, 1903	August 20, 1975	Writer	6 years' imprisonment in the Gulag
	Hryhori Maifet	Григорій Майфет	August 1, 1903	September 13, 1975	Writer, literary scholar and translator,	Labor camp
	Taisia Shutenko	Тайісія Шутенко	October 5, 1905	September 15, 1975	Composer	Imprisonment in a labor camp
	Vasylisk Hniedov	Василіск Гнєдов	March 6, 1890	November 5, 1978	Poet	Imprisonment in the Gulag
	Volodymyr Ivasiuk	Володимир Івасюк	March 4, 1949	May 18, 1979	Composer, singer, poet	Murdered by KGB
	Serhii Kukuruza	Сергій Кукуруза	February 3, 1906	September 6, 1979	Painter	Imprisonment in the Gulag
	Hryhir Tiutiunnyk	Григір Тютюнник	December 5, 1931	March 6, 1980	Writer, a representative of the Sixtiers	Ban on name and censorship of works
	Andrii Patrus-Karpatsky	Андрій Патрус-Карпатський	March 29, 1917	April 19, 1980	Poet	Imprisonment in the Gulag
	Kyrylo Hvozdyk	Кирило Гвоздик	July 22, 1895	July 20, 1981	Painter of monumental art	Twice imprisoned in the Gulag
	Vasyl Mysyk	Василь Мисик	July 24, 1907	March 3, 1983	Poet and translator	Imprisonment in the Gulag
	Rodion Skaletsky	Родіон Скалецький	November 23, 1899	March 22, 1984	Composer and conductor	Arrest and exile
	Oleksandr Korzh	Олександр Корж	March 29, 1903	April 8, 1984	Writer, poet and painter	Imprisonment in the Gulag
	Borys Antonenko-Davydovych	Борис Антоненко-Давидович	August 4, 1899	May 8, 1984	Writer, translator and linguist	Ten years' imprisonment in the Gulag
	Maria Kotliarevska	Марія Котляревська	February 8, 1902	June 18, 1984	Artist, graphic artist	Six years in the Gulag
	Valeria Dzhulai	Валерія Джулай	March 19, 1915	July 30, 1984	Poet	Imprisonment in the Gulag
	Jakiv Tyshchenko	Яків Тищенко	October 22, 1901	September 4, 1984	Writer and painter	Imprisonment in the Gulag
	Yuri Lytvyn	Юрій Литвин	November 26, 1934	September 5, 1984	Poet, writer, journalist and human rights activist	Imprisonment and death in the Gulag
	Mykola Khrustalenko	Микола Хрусталенко	September 22, 1906	November 12, 1984	Painter	Imprisonment in a labor camp
	Heorhi Petrash	Георгій Петраш	November 16, 1901	February 9, 1985	Painter and local historian	10 years in Solovki special camp
	Nadia Surovtsova	Надія Суровцова	March 17, 1896	April 13, 1985	Writer, journalist, historian, philosopher and translator	29 years in prisons, Gulags and exile
	Oleksandr Kovinka	Олександр Ковінка	January 13, 1900	July 25, 1985	Writer and humorist	Imprisonment in the Gulag
	Vasyl Stus	Василь Стус	January 6, 1938	September 4, 1985	Poet and publicist	Death in the Gulag
	Onufriy Biziukov	Онуфрій Бізюков	June 24, 1897	March 15, 1986	Painter	Three years in a labor camp
rahmenlos	Valeri Poliovy	Валерій Польовий	June 3, 1927	May 2, 1986	Composer	Imprisonment and exile
	Jakiv Maistrenko	Яків Майстренко	October 12, 1903	April 4, 1987	Writer and translator	Imprisonment in the Gulag
	Petro Sakhro	Петро Сахро	July 10, 1918	July 26, 1987	Painter	10 years' deprivation of liberty
	Petro Obal	Петро Обаль	April 19, 1900	May 26, 1987	Painter	Imprisonment in Karaganda
	Volodymyr Flys	Володимир Флис	March 23, 1924	August 7, 1987	Composer, musicologist and university lecturer	Imprisonment in the Gulag
	Petro Kolesnyk	Петро Колесник	January 28, 1905	August 9, 1987	Writer	10 years in the Gulag
	Joseph Karakis	Йосиф Юлійович Каракіс	May 29, 1902	February 23, 1988	Architect, urban planner, artist and pedagogue, representative of Ukrainian Constructivism	Persecution and dismissal
	Fedir Malytsky	Федір Малицький	March 1, 1900	July 21, 1988	Writer and poet	Imprisonment in the Gulag
	Mykola Lukash	Микола Лукаш	December 19, 1919	August 29, 1988	Translator and linguist	Professional ban
	Olha Duchyminska	Ольга Дучимінська	June 8, 1883	September 24, 1988	Writer, literary critic, translator and journalist	10 years' imprisonment in the Gulag
	Yosyp Hirniak	Йосип Гірняк	April 14, 1895	January 17, 1989	Actor and theater director	Imprisonment in the Gulag
	Hryhori Bazhul	Григорій Бажул	January 22, 1906	October 17, 1989	Bandurist	Two years of imprisonment and exile
	Olimpia Dobrovolska	Олімпія Добровольська	August 12, 1895	February 2, 1990	Actress	Imprisonment in the Gulag
	Sergei Paradjanov	Сергій Параджанов	January 9, 1924	July 21, 1990	Film director	Five years in a labor camp
	Valentyna Mahmedova	Валентина Махмедова	January 21, 1918	June 19, 1991	Theater artist, graphic artist	Imprisonment in a labor camp and exile
	Serhi Lvov	Сергій Львов	August 18, 1930	August 11, 1991	Painter	7 years' exile
	Yaroslav Lesiv	Ярослав Лесів	January 3, 1945	October 10, 1991	Poet and priest	13 years' imprisonment in the Gulag
	Halyna Makovska	Галина Маковська	March 6, 1915	September 2, 1992	Theater artist, graphic artist	8 years' imprisonment
	Ivan Svitlychnyi	Іван Світличний	September 20, 1929	October 25, 1992	Literary critic, poet, translator, human rights activist and dissident, representative of the Sixtiers	Seven years in a labor camp and five years in exile
	Yaroslav Lukavetsky	Ярослав Лукавецький	March 28, 1908	May 14, 1993	Painter, stage designer, architect	Unjustly arrested and deported to Siberia
	Maria Kapnist	Марія Капніст	April 4, 1914	October 25, 1993	Film actress	15 years' imprisonment in the Gulag
	Yevhen Cherednychenko	Євген Чердниченко	January 30, 1914	January 11, 1994	Poet, athlete and pedagogue	Imprisonment in the Gulag
	Mychailo Osadchy	Михайло Осадчий	March 22, 1936	July 5, 1994	Writer and journalist	Two arrests and high-security camps
	Hryhori Kochur	Григорій Кочур	November 17, 1908	December 15, 1994	Poet, translator and literary scholar	10 years' imprisonment in the Gulag
	Taras Melnychuk	Тарас Мельничук	August 20, 1938	March 29, 1995	Poet	Imprisonment in the Gulag
	Zhinet Maksymovych	Жінет Максимович	January 18, 1929	May 29, 1995	Writer and translator	Imprisonment in the Gulag
	Mechyslav Hasko	Мечислав Гасько	January 27, 1907	November 5, 1996	Writer	Imprisonment in the Gulag
	Kuzma Hryb	Кузьма Гриб	October 30, 1910	March 21, 1997	Writer	Imprisonment in the Gulag
	Ivan Kolyaska	Іван Коляска	October 5, 1915	October 20, 1997	Writer, publicist and translator	Arrest and expulsion from the Soviet Union
	Viktor Rafalsky	Віктор Рафальський	1918	November 27, 1997	Poet and writer	Punitive psychiatry
	Danylo Narbut	Данило Нарбут	January 22, 1916	March 2, 1998	Painter	Two years' imprisonment with further exile and a ban on living in Ukraine
	Paraska Plytka-Horytsvit	Параска Плитка-Горицвіт	March 1, 1927	April 16, 1998	Painter, photographer, writer and ethnographer	Imprisonment and exile
	Maria Kreminyarivska	Марія Кремін'ярівська	October 20, 1902	January 3, 1999	Writer	Exile
	Vassyl Turetsky	Василь Турецький	March 5, 1923	January 7, 2000	Sculptor, painter, graphic artist and theater artist.	Imprisonment in the Gulag
	Nestor Kysilevsky	Нестор Кисiлевський	September 20, 1909	April 14, 2000	Sculptor	Imprisonment in the Gulag
	Anatoli Lupynis	Анатолій Лупиніс	July 21, 1937	February 5, 2000	Poet, human rights activist	Imprisonment in labor camps and psychiatric institutions
	Mykola Sarma-Sokolovsky	Микола Сарма-Соколовський	May 19, 1910	August 9, 2001	Bandurist, poet and painter	Imprisonment in the Gulag
	Heorhij Mahmedov	Георгій Махмедов	May 6, 1921	February 3, 2001	Painter	Five years in a labor camp
	Halyna Hordasevych	Галина Гордасевич	March 31, 1935	March 11, 2001	Poet	Imprisonment in labor camps
	Mykola Samiilenko	Микола Саміленко	November 11, 1917	May 11, 2001	Poet	Imprisonment in the Gulag
	Mychailo Masyutko	Михайло Масютко	November 18, 1918	November 18, 2001	Poet, human rights activist	Imprisonment in the Gulag
	Mykola Skelya-Studetsky	Микола Скеля-Студецький	May 22, 1921	January 19, 2002	Poet	Imprisonment in the Gulag
	Oleh Hasyuk	Олег Гасюк	January 10, 1922	October 10, 2002	Bandurist	Imprisonment in the Gulag
	Oleksandr Dzygar	Олександр Дзигар	August 26, 1916	August 31, 2002	Violinist	Imprisonment and exile
	Halyna Savytska	Галина Савицька	June 30, 1922	January 2, 2003	Poet, writer and journalist	Imprisonment in the Gulag
	Oles Berdnyk	Олесь Бердник	November 27, 1927	March 18, 2003	Writer, science fiction author	Imprisonment in the Gulag
	Petro Linynskyj	Петро Лінинський	October 1, 1920	July 10, 2003	Wood sculptor, ceramic artist, collector	Imprisonment in the Gulag
	Kateryna Mandryk-Kuybida	Катерина Мандрик-Куйбіда	May 26, 1927	March 14, 2004	Poet	Imprisonment in the Gulag
	Mykola Rudenko	Микола Руденко	December 19, 1920	April 1, 2004	Writer, poet, philosopher	Seven years' imprisonment in a camp and five years in exile
	Mykola Getman	Микола Гетьман	December 23, 1917	August 29, 2004	Painter	Imprisonment in the Gulag
	Borys Pavlivsky	Борис Павлівський	September 21, 1906	November 8, 2004	Poet and journalist	Imprisonment in the Gulag
	Ivan Hnatyuk	Іван Гнатюк	July 27, 1929	May 5, 2005	Poet and translator	12 years' imprisonment in the Gulag
	Oleksi Nyrko	Олексій Нирко	January 1, 1926	September 27, 2005	Kobzar, bandurist	5 years' imprisonment in the Gulag
	Mykola Kholodny	Микола Холодний	July 31, 1939	2006	Poet	Imprisonment and expulsion from Kyiv
	Opanas Zalyvakha	Опанас Заливаха	November 26, 1925	April 24, 2007	Painter	Five years' forced labor in a camp in Mordovia, ban on painting
	Stepan Mazura	Степан Мазура	December 24, 1922	September 12, 2008	Bandurist	Imprisonment in the Gulag
	Iryna Senyk	Ірина Сеник	June 8, 1926	October 25, 2009	Poet, nurse and Soviet dissident	34 years' imprisonment in the Gulag
	Vasyl Barladyanu-Byrladnyk	Василь Барладяну-Бирладник	August 23, 1943	December 3, 2010	Poet, art historian, journalist.	Six years in a labor camp
	Stepan Sapelyak	Степан Сапеляк	March 26, 1951	February 1, 2012	Writer, publicist, literary scholar, human rights defender	Five years' deprivation of liberty and three years' exile
	Atena Pashko	Атена Пашко	October 10, 1931	March 20, 2012	Poet	Publication ban, searches, imprisonment
	Yaroslava Menkush	Ярослава Менкуш	February 16, 1923	December 9, 2012	Designer, master of artistic embroidery	Imprisonment in a labor camp
	Hryhory Baran	Григорій Баран	December 1, 1930	May 13, 2013	Poet and journalist	Imprisonment in a labor camp
	Yevhen Sverstiuk	Євген Сверстюк	December 13, 1927	December 1, 2014	Philosopher, writer, literary critic, translator	Seven years of forced labor in a labor camp
	Stefaniia Shabatura	Стефанія Шабатура	November 5, 1938	December 17, 2014	Carpet artist	Labor camp in Mordovia and exile in Tajikistan
	Mychailo Ivanchenko	Михайло Іванченко	November 18, 1923	January 14, 2015	Writer, poet and painter	Imprisonment in the Gulag
	Anatoli Shevchuk	Анатолій Шевчук	February 6, 1937	August 12, 2015	Writer, short story writer, master of psychological prose	Five years' imprisonment in a labor camp
	Sofia Malylyo	Софія Малильо	December 3, 1926	October 19, 2015	Poet	Imprisonment in the Gulag
	Svyatoslay Karavansky	Святослав Караванський	December 24, 1920	December 17, 2016	Poet, linguist, translator, journalist	31 years of imprisonment and forced labor
	Mykola Vasylenko	Микола Василенко	May 1, 1924	September 8, 2018	Poet and writer	Imprisonment in the Gulag
	Borys Mirus	Борис Мірус	August 19, 1928	April 13, 2021	Actor	10 years in the Gulag
	Mykola Adamenko	Микола Адаменко	December 20, 1931	May 7, 2022	Poet	Imprisonment in the Gulag
	Stepan Kolesnyk	Степан Колесник	February 12, 1932	April 21, 2024	Writer and journalist	Persecution and professional ban
	Jaroslav Omelyan	Ярослав Омелян	January 1, 1929	August 21, 2025	Painter	9 years' exile in the Irkutsk region
	Oleksi Stepovy	Олексій Степовий	March 19, 1927		Painter	Imprisonment in the Gulag
	Oleksa Riznykiv (Riznychenko)	Олекса Різників	March 19, 1937		Writer	Imprisonment in the Gulag
	Mykola Horbal	Микола Горбаль	September 10, 1940		Poet, politician and human rights activist	Imprisonment and exile

== See also ==
- Executed Renaissance
- Sandarmokh
- Sixtiers
- Red Terror
