= Boychuk =

Boychuk or Boichuk (Ukrainian: Бойчук) is a Ukrainian surname.

People with the surname include:

- Alexander Boichuk (born 1950), Ukrainian mathematician
- Andriy Boychuk (born 1976), Ukrainian politician
- Andy Boychuk (born 1941), Canadian long-distance runner
- Bohdan Boychuk (born 1996), Ukrainian footballer
- Ihor Boychuk (born 1994), Ukrainian footballer
- Johnny Boychuk (born 1984), Canadian hockey player
- Maksim Boychuk (born 1997), Russian footballer
- Mykhailo Boychuk (1882–1937), Ukrainian painter, founder of Boychukism
- Rick Boychuk (born c. 1947), Canadian labour leader and politician
- Sofiya Nalepinska-Boychuk (1884–1937), Ukrainian artist
- Tanya Boychuk (born 2000), Canadian soccer player
- Taras Boychuk (born 1966), Ukrainian chronobiologist
- Tymofiy Boychuk (1897–1922), Ukrainian painter
- Zach Boychuk (born 1989), Canadian hockey player
