= Boychukism =

Early 20th century Ukrainian art style

Boychuckism
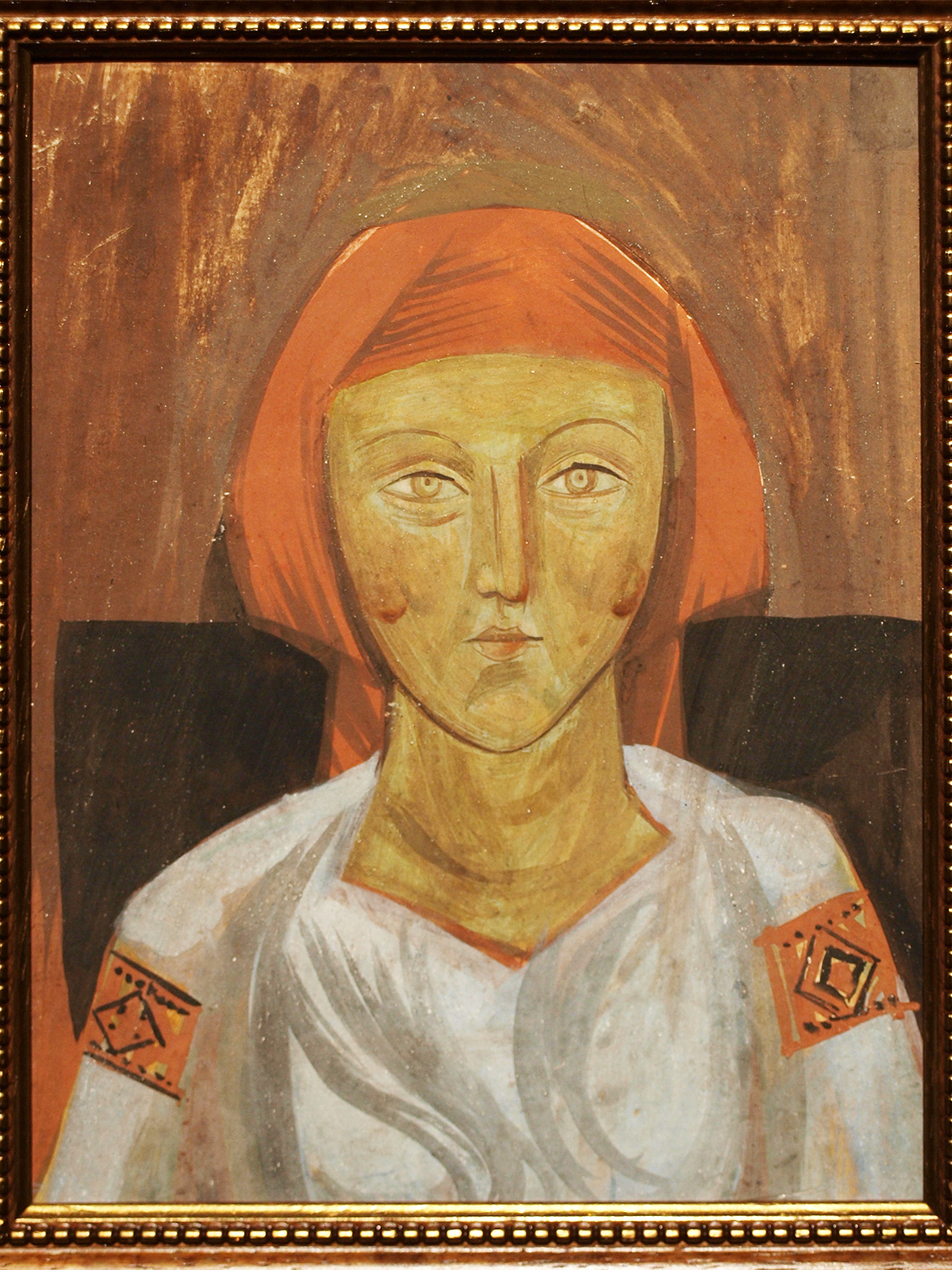
- Ukrainian Woman, Mykhailo Boychuk, ca. 1910.
- Years active: 1910s–1930s
- Location: Kyiv
- Major figures: Mykhailo Boychuk, Tymofiy Boychuk, Ivan Padalka, Vasily Sedlyar, Sofiia Nalepinska-Boychuk, Yaroslava Muzyka, Manuil Shechtman, Mariia Yunak
- Influences: Byzantine and Italian monumental painting; Rus' icon painting; Ukrainian folk art
- Influenced: Ukrainian avant-garde

Boychukism is a cultural and artistic phenomenon in the history of Ukrainian art of 1910–1930s, distinguished by its artistic monumental-synthetic style.

The basis of Boychuk's concept of the development of new art was an appeal to the traditions of Byzantine and Italian monumental painting, as well as middle-age Rus' icon painting, as the primary source of the Ukrainian national form.

The name comes from the name of the founder of the movement: Mykhailo Boychuk, a muralist and graphic artist. Boychuk, as well as several other artists, made Soviet propaganda and promoted communism. However, Boychuk was labelled as a "bourgeois nationalist" and he was executed.

At the end of 1925, the Association of Revolutionary Art of Ukraine (ARIU) was founded in Kyiv, uniting Boychukists.

== Gallery ==
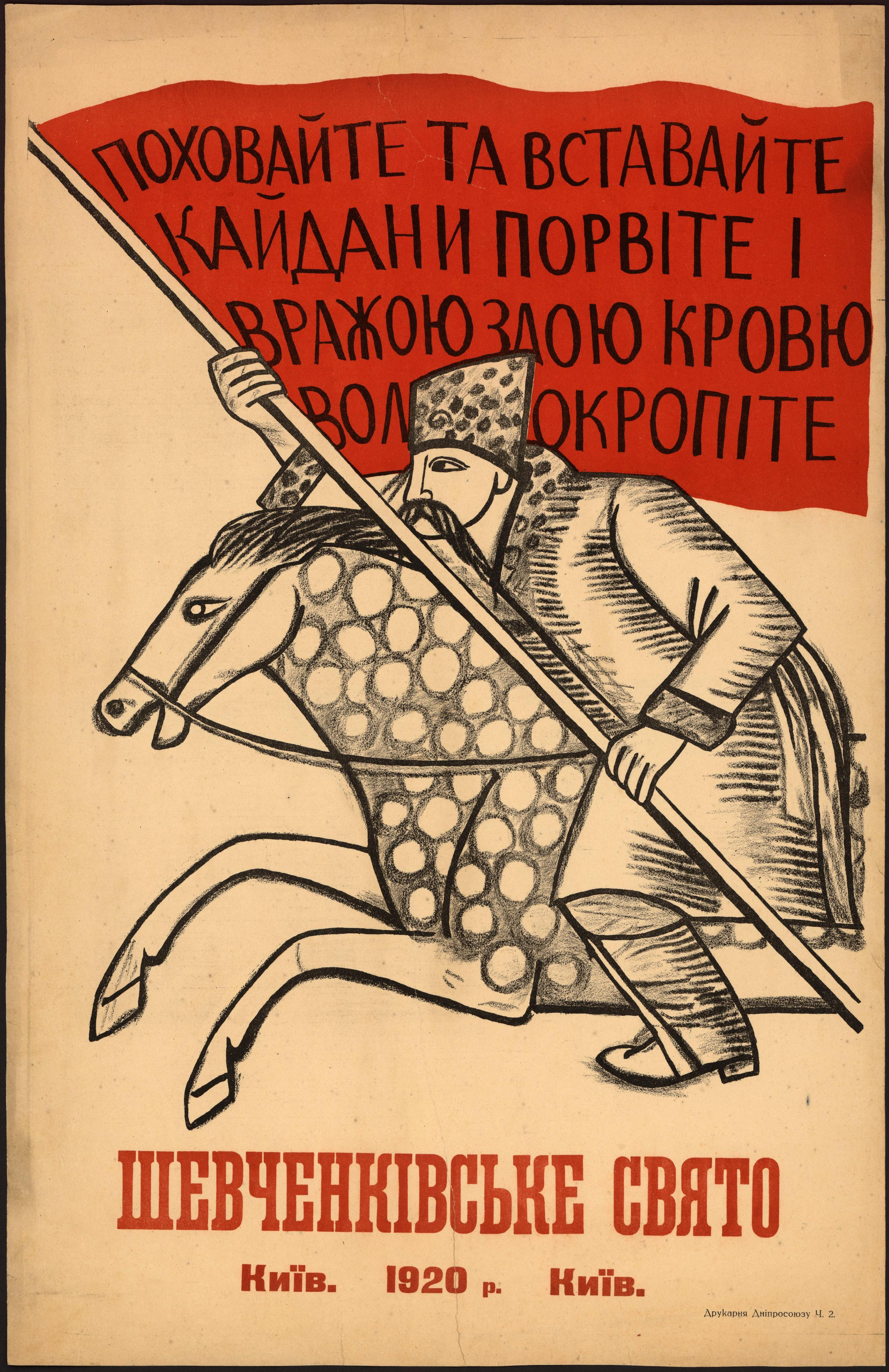
Shevchenko holiday, Mikhail Boychuk, 1920

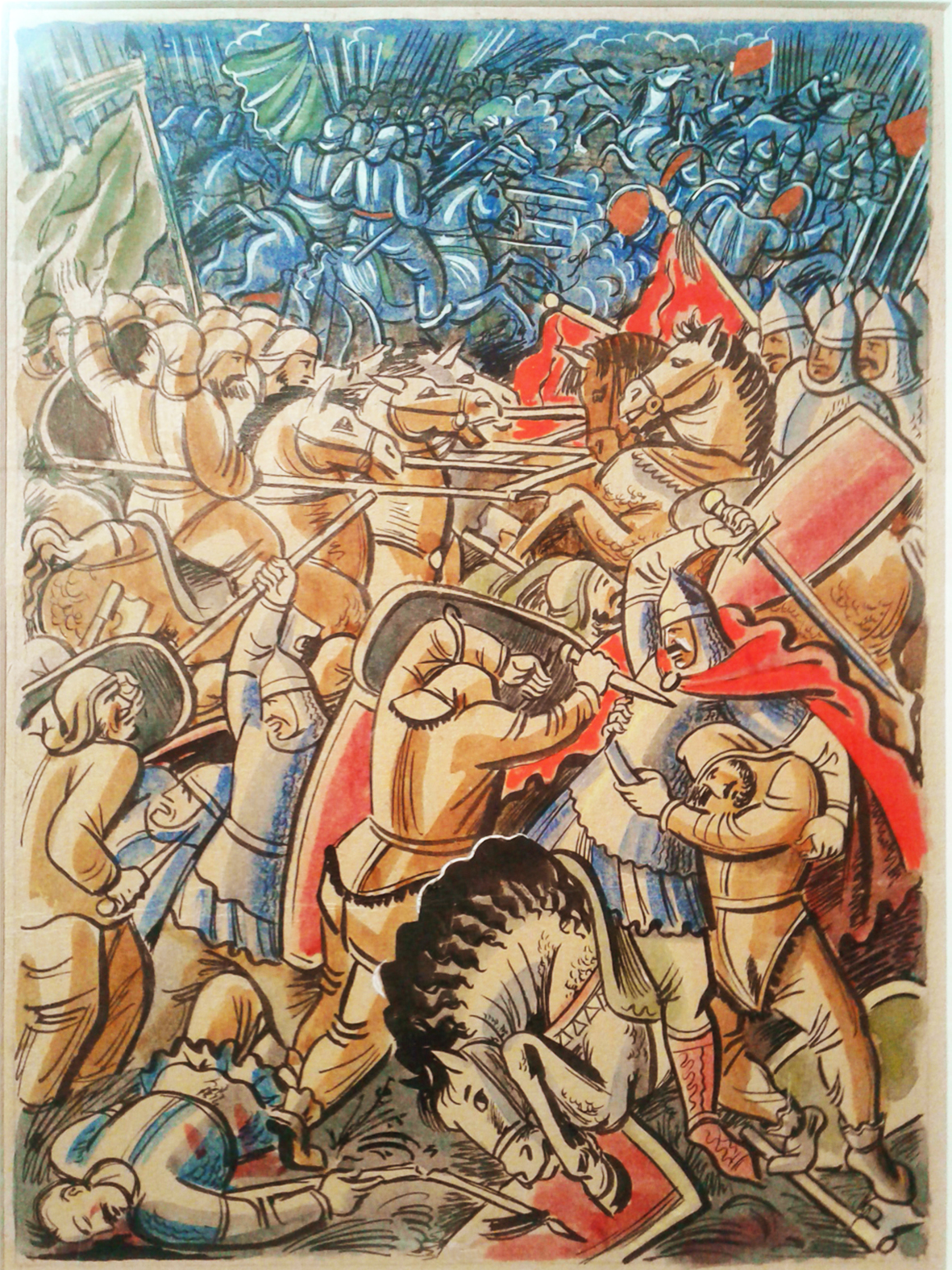
M. Padalka. Sketch of an illustration for “The Tale of Igor’s Campaign,” 1928.

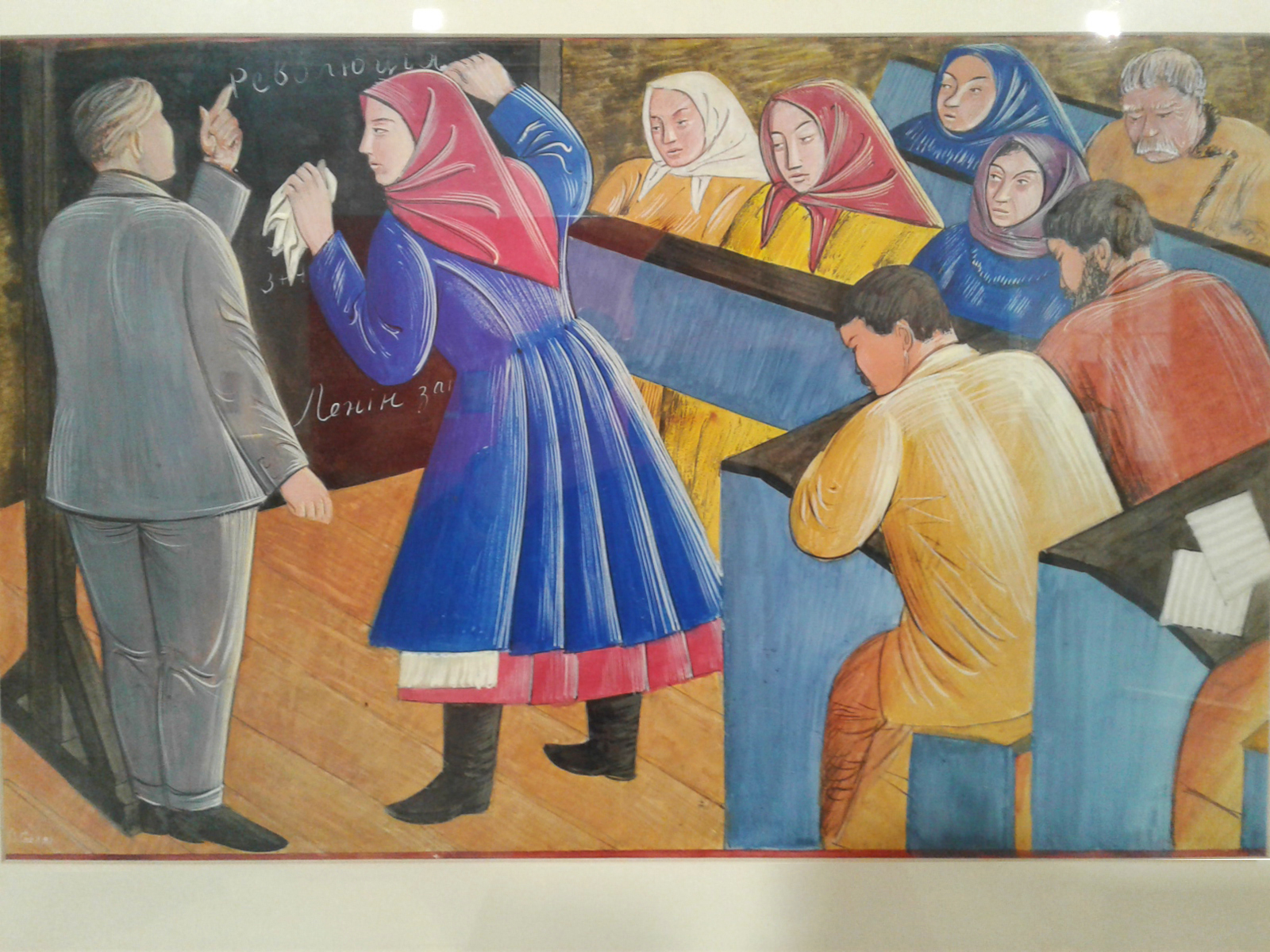
Sedlyar, Vasily Teofanovich, “At the school of educational programs”, the limit of the 1920-1930s.

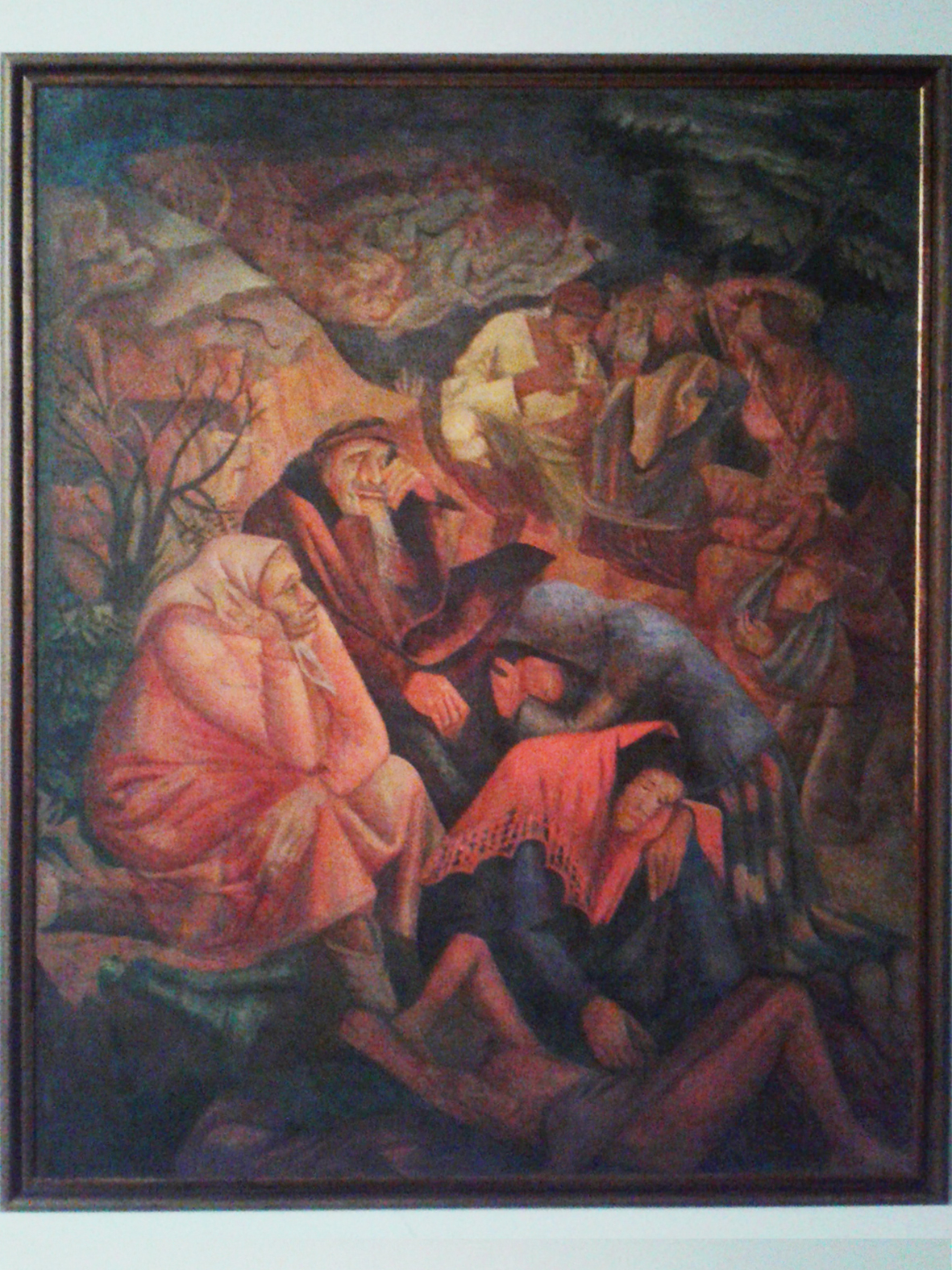
Shekhtman, Manuil Iosifovich “Jewish pogrom”, 1926.

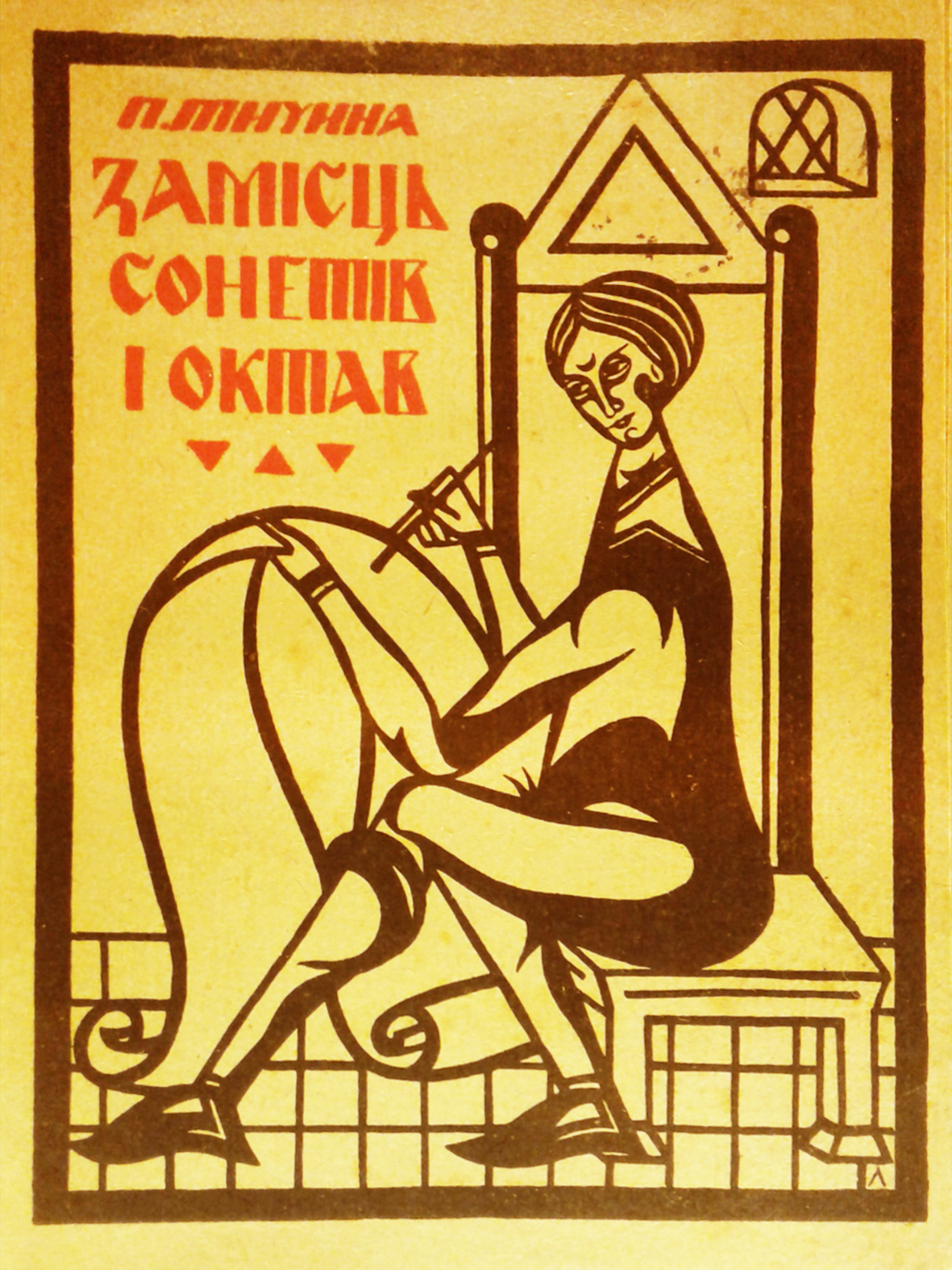
L. Lozovsky. Illustration, “Instead of sonnets and octaves”, Tychina, Pavel Grigorievich, 1920

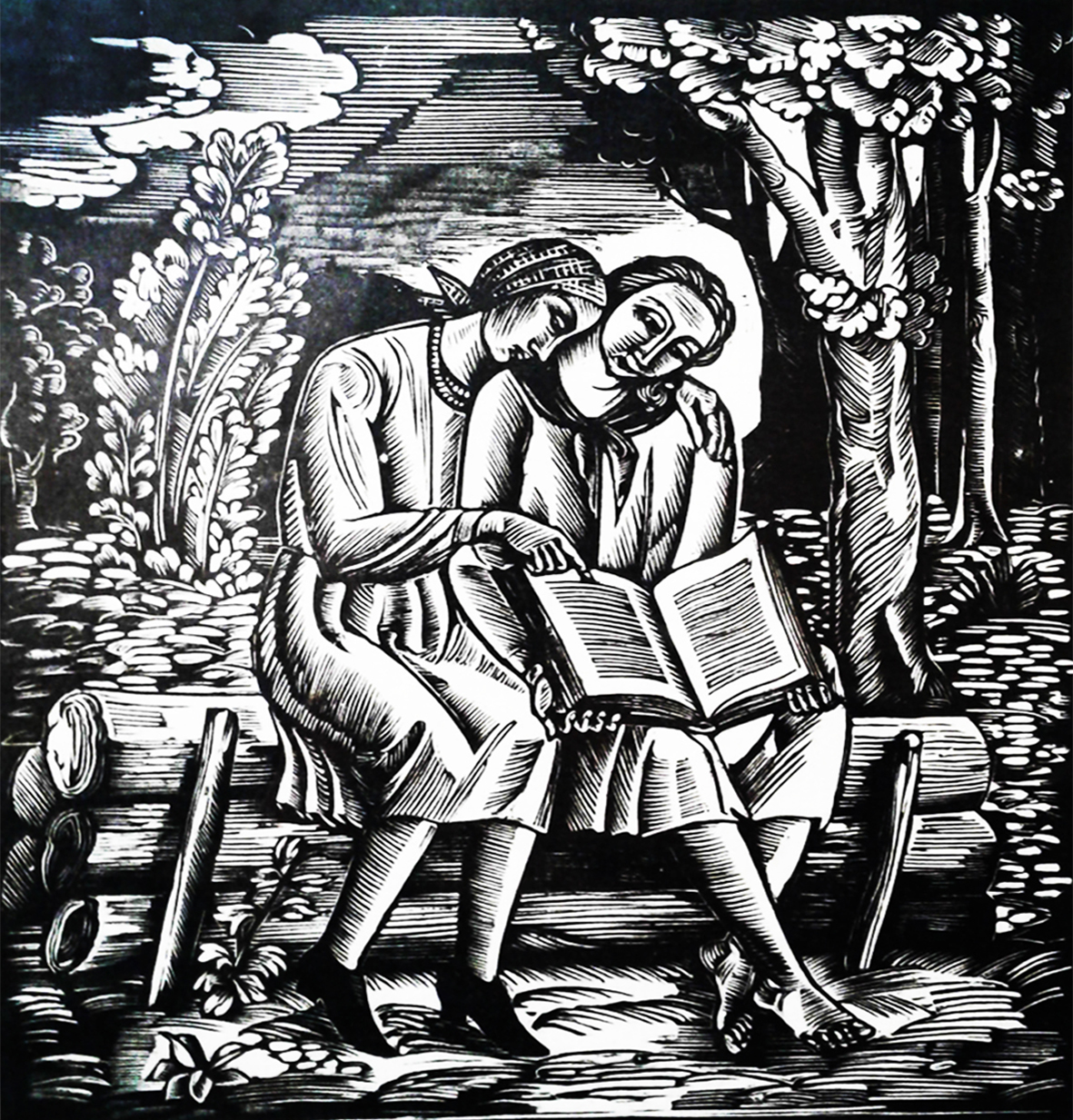
Nalepinskaya-Boychuk, Sofya Alexandrovna, “Girls with a book”, 1927
