= Slava Stetsko =

Ukrainian politician (1920–2003)

- Слава Стецько
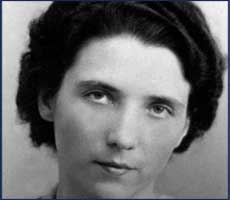
- Stetsko in 1949

Chairwoman of the Anti-Bolshevik Bloc of Nations
- In office 5 July 1986 – 1996
- Preceded by: Yaroslav Stetsko
- Succeeded by: Organization dissolved

Chairwoman of the Congress of Ukrainian Nationalists
- In office 18 October 1992 – 12 March 2003
- Preceded by: Party founded
- Succeeded by: Oleksiy Ivchenko

Leader of the OUN-B
- In office 1991–2001
- Preceded by: Vasyl Oleskiv
- Succeeded by: Andriy Haidamakha

Member of the Central Committee of the Anti-Bolshevik Bloc of Nations
- In office 1945/46–1996
- Preceded by: Yaroslav Stetsko
- Succeeded by: Organization dissolved

Personal details
- Born: Anna Yevheniia Muzyka; 14 May 1920 Romanówka, Second Polish Republic (now Romanivka, Ukraine)
- Died: 12 March 2003 (aged 82) Munich, Bavaria, Germany
- Party: OUN
- Spouse: Yaroslav Stetsko

Yaroslava Yosypivna Stetsko (Ukrainian: Ярослава Йосипівна Стецько, Polish: Sława Stećko; 14 May 1920 – 12 March 2003), also popularly known as Slava Stetsko, was a Ukrainian politician and a WWII-era veteran of the Organisation of Ukrainian Nationalists.

== Biography ==
Born Anna (Hanna) Yevheniia Muzyka (Ukrainian: Анна (Ганна) Євгенія Музика) in Romanówka near Ternopil in the Second Polish Republic, she became a member of the Organization of Ukrainian Nationalists (OUN) in 1938. When a schism occurred within the OUN in 1940, Anna went with the wing of the OUN-B led by Stepan Bandera. During World War II, she served as an orderly and nurse in the Ukrainian Insurgent Army. After spending two years in the underground, in 1943 she was arrested by Germans in Lwów. She remained in Germany as an émigré after her release in 1944.

After the war, she married Yaroslav Stetsko and graduated from the Ludwig-Maximilians-Universität München. During that time she cooperated with Stepan Bandera and Dmytro Dontsov. Between 1948 and 1953, she was a member of the presidium of the Ukrainian Youth Association, and from 1968 headed the Foreign Policy Division of the Provid. During her time in emigration Stetsko served as chief editor of several Ukrainian diaspora publications. During that time she also became an executive member of the World Anti-Communist League. Stetsko was a member of the central committee of the Anti-Bolshevik Bloc of Nations (ABN) and became its chairman after the death of her husband in 1986.

Slava Stetsko returned to Ukraine in July 1991 after 50 years of emigration. At the time of her return, she was forced to use a different name in order to evade arrest. The following year, she formed and became a chairman of the Congress of Ukrainian Nationalists (CUN), the political party that was established in Ukraine on the basis of the Organization of Ukrainian Nationalists (OUN), which she also led from 1991 to 2001.

== Personal life and death ==
Besides her native Ukrainian, Stetsko possessed the knowledge of Polish, English, German, French, Spanish, Italian, Slovak and Belarusian languages. After her return to Ukraine, she lived at her niece's house in Kyiv, as she had no flat of her own.

Slava Stetsko died in Munich, after a short illness, having previously suffered a heart attack. She was buried at Baikove Cemetery in Kyiv.

Let my name be forgotten, but let Ukraine remain in eternity and in progress.

— Slava Stetsko

== See also ==
- List of members of the Verkhovna Rada of Ukraine who died in office
