= Romanivka, Terebovlia urban hromada, Ternopil Raion, Ternopil Oblast =

Village in Ternopil Oblast, Ukraine

Romanivka Романівка
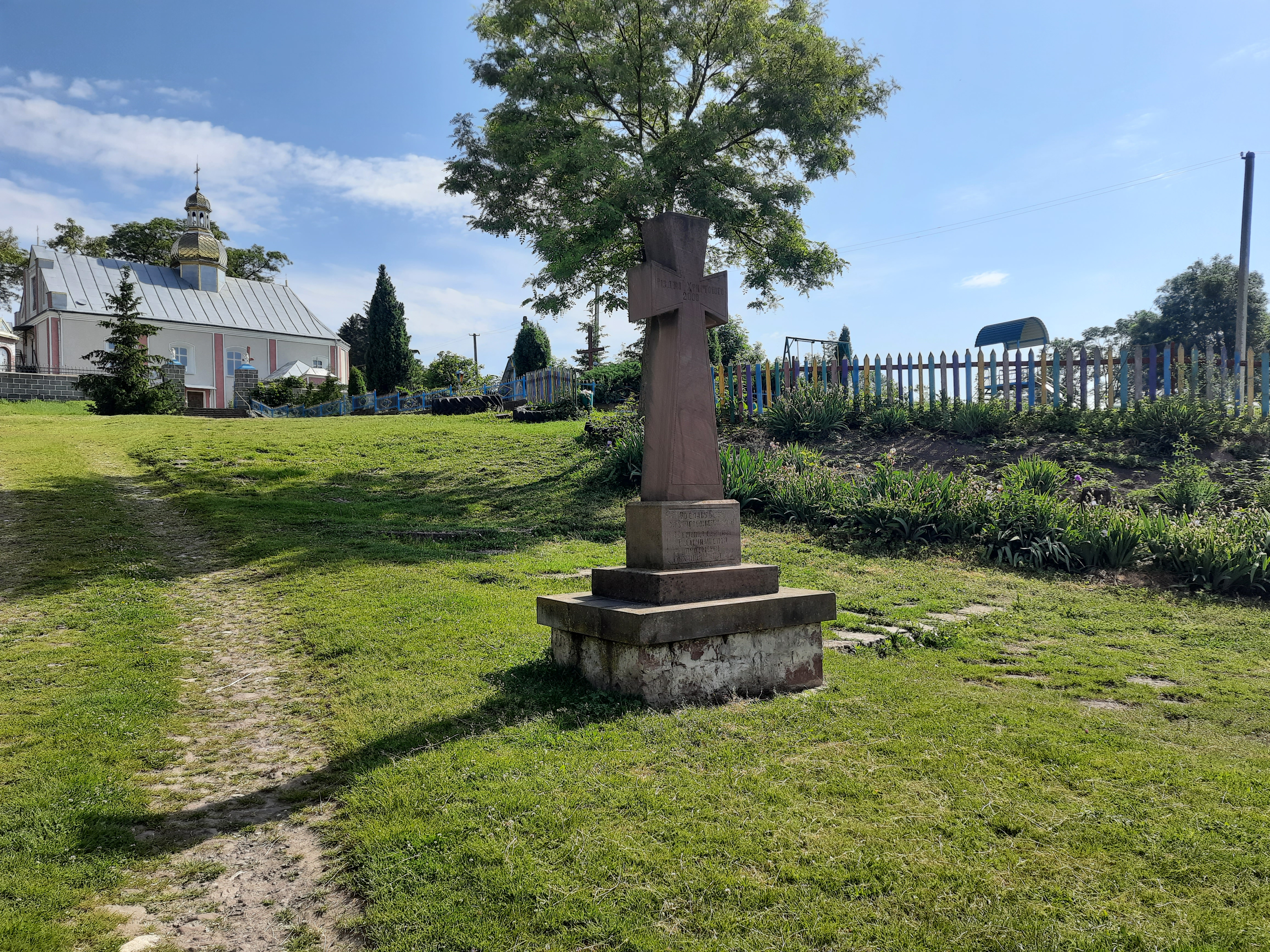
- Memorial cross and the Holy Cross Church in Romanivka

- Location in Ternopil Oblast Romanivka (Ukraine)
- Coordinates: 49°13′12″N 25°34′9″E
- Country: Ukraine
- Oblast: Ternopil Oblast
- Raion: Ternopil Raion
- Hromada: Terebovlia Hromada
- Postal code: 48151

Romanivka (Ukrainian: Романівка, Polish: Romanówka) is a village in Terebovlia urban hromada, Ternopil Raion, Ternopil Oblast, Ukraine.

== History ==
The first written mention in Polish documents is in 1471.

After the liquidation of the Terebovlia Raion on 19 July 2020, the village became part of the Ternopil Raion.

== Religion ==
two churches:

- the brick Church of the Exaltation of the Holy Cross (1842, OCU)
- the stone Saint Nicholas Church (2008, UGCC)

== Notable residents ==
Born

- Mykhailo Boychuk (1882–1937), Ukrainian painter and graphic artist
- Tymofiy Boychuk (1896–1922), Ukrainian monumentalist painter
- Slava Stetsko (1920–2003), Ukrainian social and political activist, educator, publicist, editor

Writer and public figure Ivan Franko lived in the village.
