= Mariia Yunak =

Ukrainian painter (1902–1977)

Mariia Ivanivna Yunak (Ukrainian: Марія Іванівна Юнак; 15 February 1902 in Kyiv – 1 August 1977) was a Ukrainian artist. She was a Boychukist.

== Life ==
Yunak graduated from the Kyiv Women’s Gymnasium with distinction in Kyiv and entered the National Academy of Fine Arts and Architecture in 1920, in the same class as Mykhailo Boychuk. In autumn 1921, she participated in the academy's second annual show, where she presented works entitled "Girl with headscarf" and "Fairytale". After she graduated, Yunak continued to work in Boychuk's atelier.

Along with Antonina Ivanova, and under the supervision of Boychuk, Yunak participated in the painting of the Sanatorium of the All-Ukrainian Central Executive Committee. There, she also painted frescoes of Taras Shevchenko and Ivan Franko, as well as ornamental wall art. Beginning in 1929, Yunak participated in republican art exhibitions. In 1934, Yunak was invited to work as a muralist at the Chervonohvardiiskyi theatre in Kharkiv. This was the last work of this nature that Yunak or any Boychukist undertook, as they were all declared enemies of the people a year later.

From the second half of the 1930s, Yunak worked on book and posters, and developed patterns for rugs. Because of her status as a Boychukist, she was forbidden from joining the Artists' Union of the Ukrainian SSR. In March 1947 she was employed at the Academy for Architecture of the Ukrainian SSR. Her last large scale works were four metre long frescoes entitled "Seasons", which she painted at the country home of Vera Kutynska.

== Selected works ==
- Казка / Fairy Tale (1921)
- Дівчина в хустині / Girl in a Kerchief (1921)
- Українки / Ukrainerinnen (1921)
- Портрет Віри Кутинської / Portrait of Vera Kutynska (1922)
- Портрет Івана Франка / Portrait of Ivan Franko (1927)
- Голова дівчинки / Head of a girl (1948)
- Зварниця / Swiss girl (1968)
- Квіти / Flowers (1972)
- Пори року / Seasons (1975)
