= Ivan Padalka =

Ukrainian painter (1894–1937)

- Іван Падалка
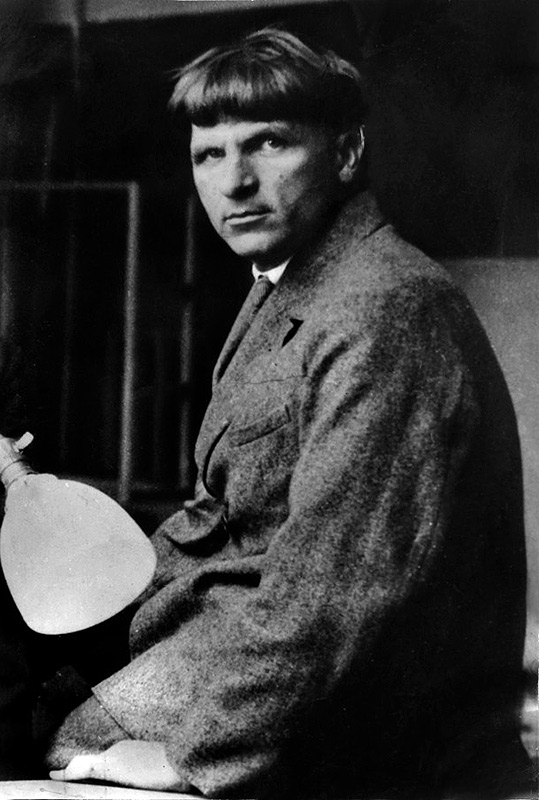
- Padalka in 1917
- Born: Івaн Івaнович Пaдалка; Ivan Ivanovych Padalka; 15 November 1894; Zhornoklyovy, Zolotonoshsky Uyezd, Poltava Governorate, Russian Empire (now Ukraine)
- Died: 12 July 1937 (aged 42); Kyiv, Ukrainian SSR, USSR (now Ukraine}
- Cause of death: Execution by firing squad
- Occupations: Painter; professor; writer

Ivan Ivanovych Padalka (Ukrainian: Івaн Івaнович Пaдалка: 15 November 1894 – 13 July 1937) was a Ukrainian painter, professor and writer. Executed during the Great Purge, Padalka is considered a part of the Executed Renaissance.

== Biography ==
Padalka was born on 15 November 1894 in the selo of Zhornoklovy, Zolotonoshsky Uyezd (present-day Cherkasy Raion, Ukraine) to a farming family of modest means. Padalka was one of eight children. He began his education at the local parish school, where he first displayed a talent for art. His abilities were noticed by a local nobleman, who helped him to finance studies at the State Ceramics Vocational School in Myrhorod, taught by Opanas Slastion. His work was often held up as a model for the class. He worked there until 1913, when he was excluded for organizing revolutionary activities.

He then went to Poltava and found a position at the Ethnographic Museum, where they made copies of Ukrainian carpet designs for a weaving workshop in Kyiv owned by Bogdan Khanenko, who was a major patron of the arts. His earnings enabled him to enroll at the short-lived Kyiv Art School. His works were regularly exhibited there, and he began to illustrate children's books.

In 1917, after finishing his studies at the Kyiv Art School, he transferred to the Ukrainian State Academy of Arts, where he became a student in the workshop of Mykhailo Boychuk. While there, he was largely involved in decorative work for buildings, designing posters and creating various propaganda materials for public display. Pedalka received a commission from the State Publishing House to illustrate a collection of children's stories called Барвінок (Periwinkle), on which he worked together with Boychuk's younger brother Tymofiy.

After graduating in 1920, he returned to Myrhorod and became a teacher at his former ceramics school. Later, he taught the same subject at a technical school in Kyiv. His proficiency in his chosen specialty was widely recognized, so he was able to secure a position at the Kharkiv State Academy of Design and Arts, where he worked from 1925 to 1934. That year, he returned to Kyiv to accept an appointment as a Professor at the State Academy.

In 1936, he was arrested and tortured by the NKVD on charges of counterrevolutionary activities, related to Ukrainian nationalism. In July 1937, he was executed by firing squad, together with his former mentor and friend, Mykhailo Boychuk, and the painter Vasily Sedlyar. He was posthumously "rehabilitated" in 1958 by the Soviet Government.

== Selected works ==
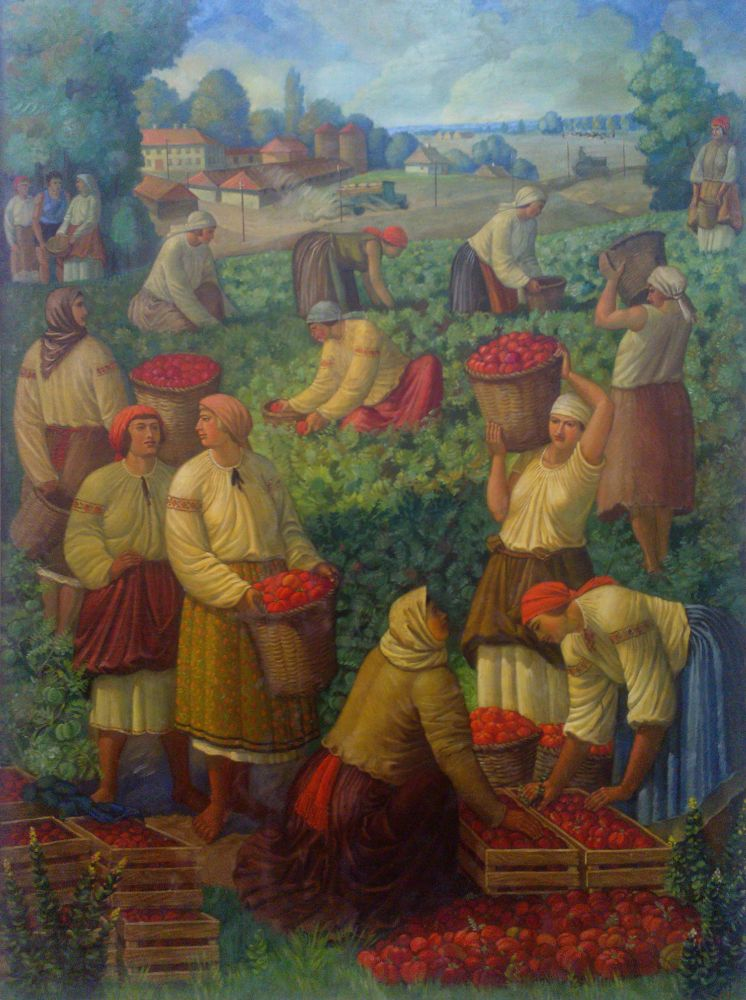
Picking Tomatoes

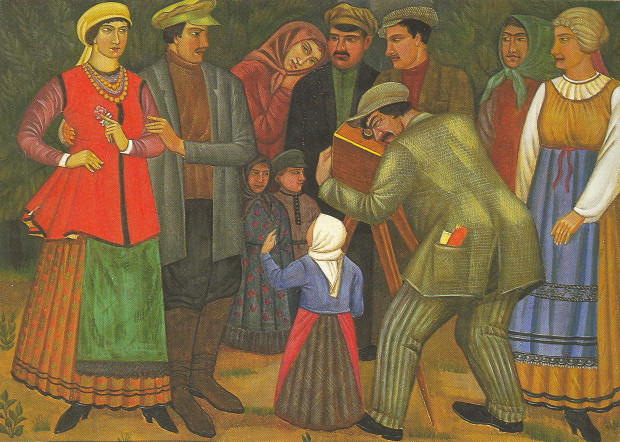
The Village Photographer

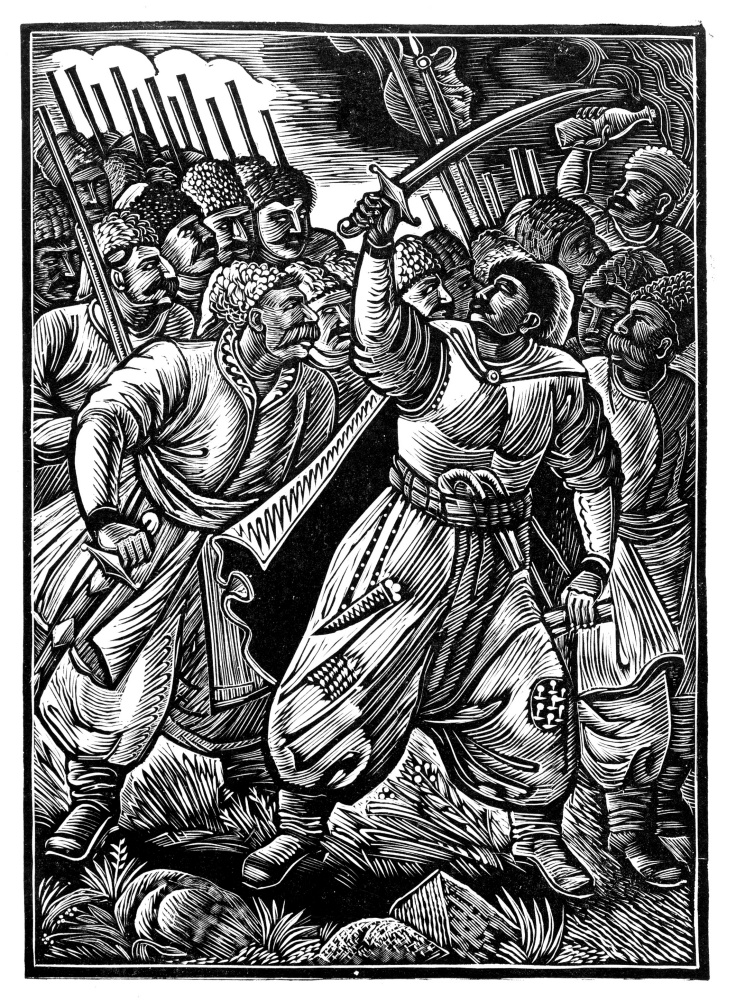
Illustration for the epic poem "Aeneid"

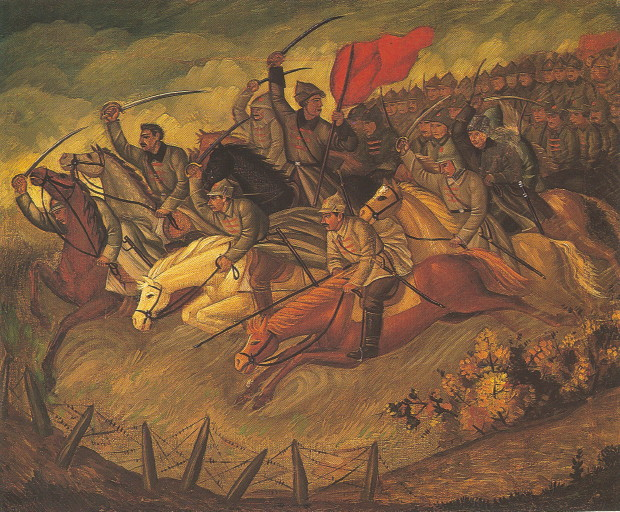
Attack of the Red Cavalry

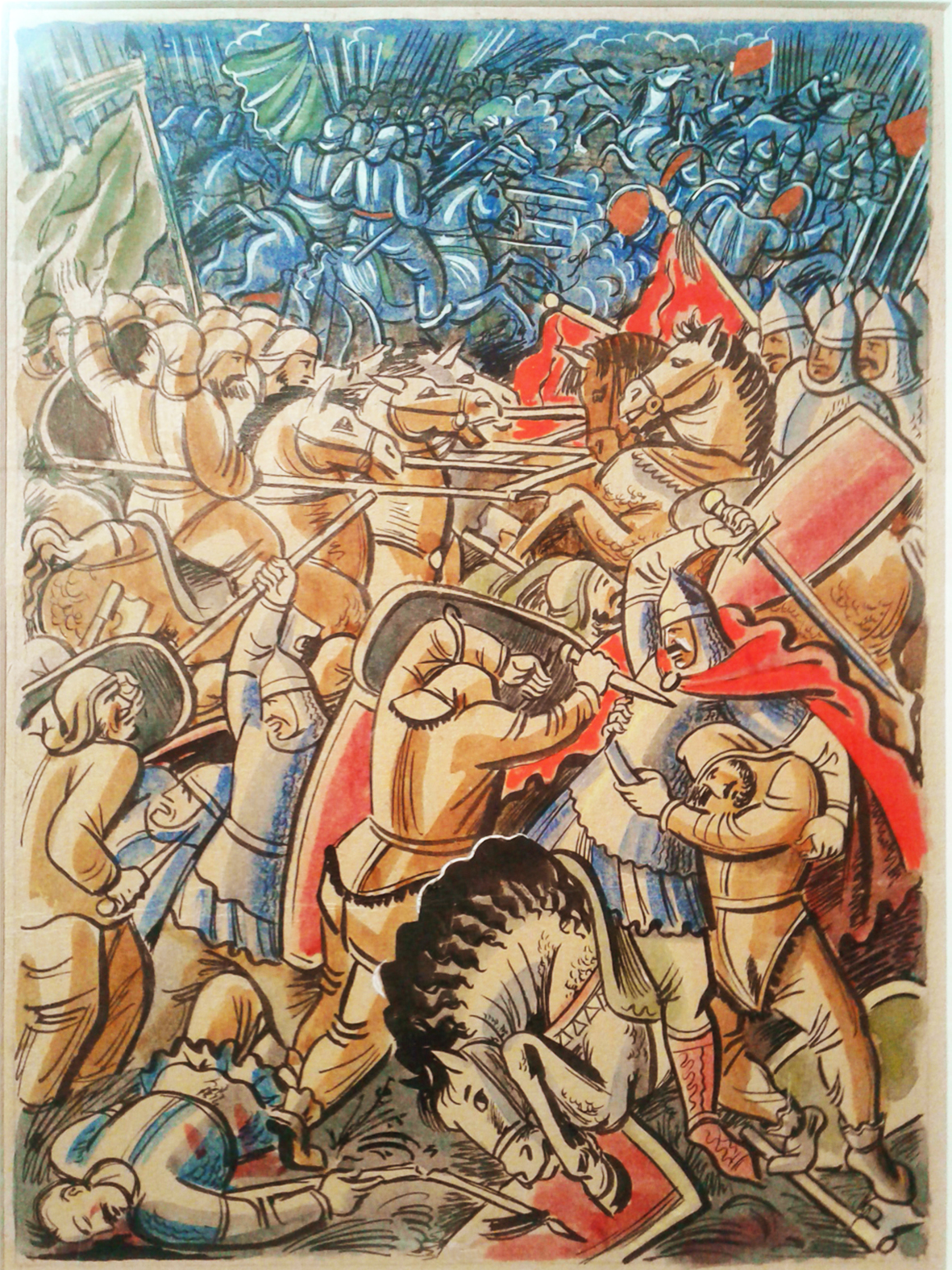
Illustration for the
"Tale of Igor's Campaign"
