= Manuil Shechtman =

Soviet painter (1900–1941)

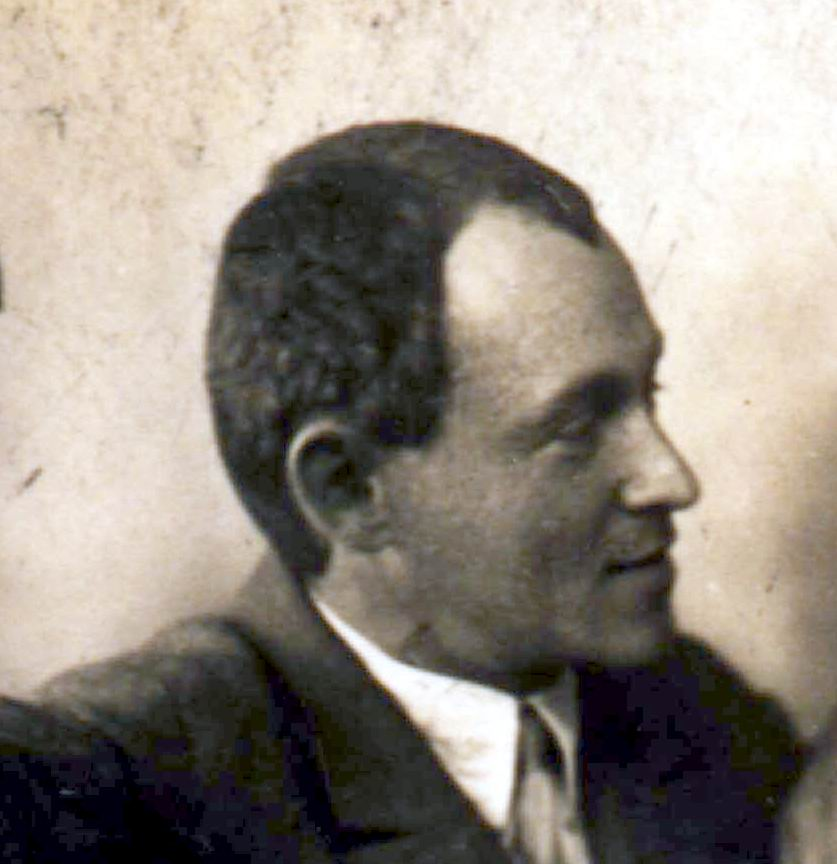
Manuil Shechtman (1926)

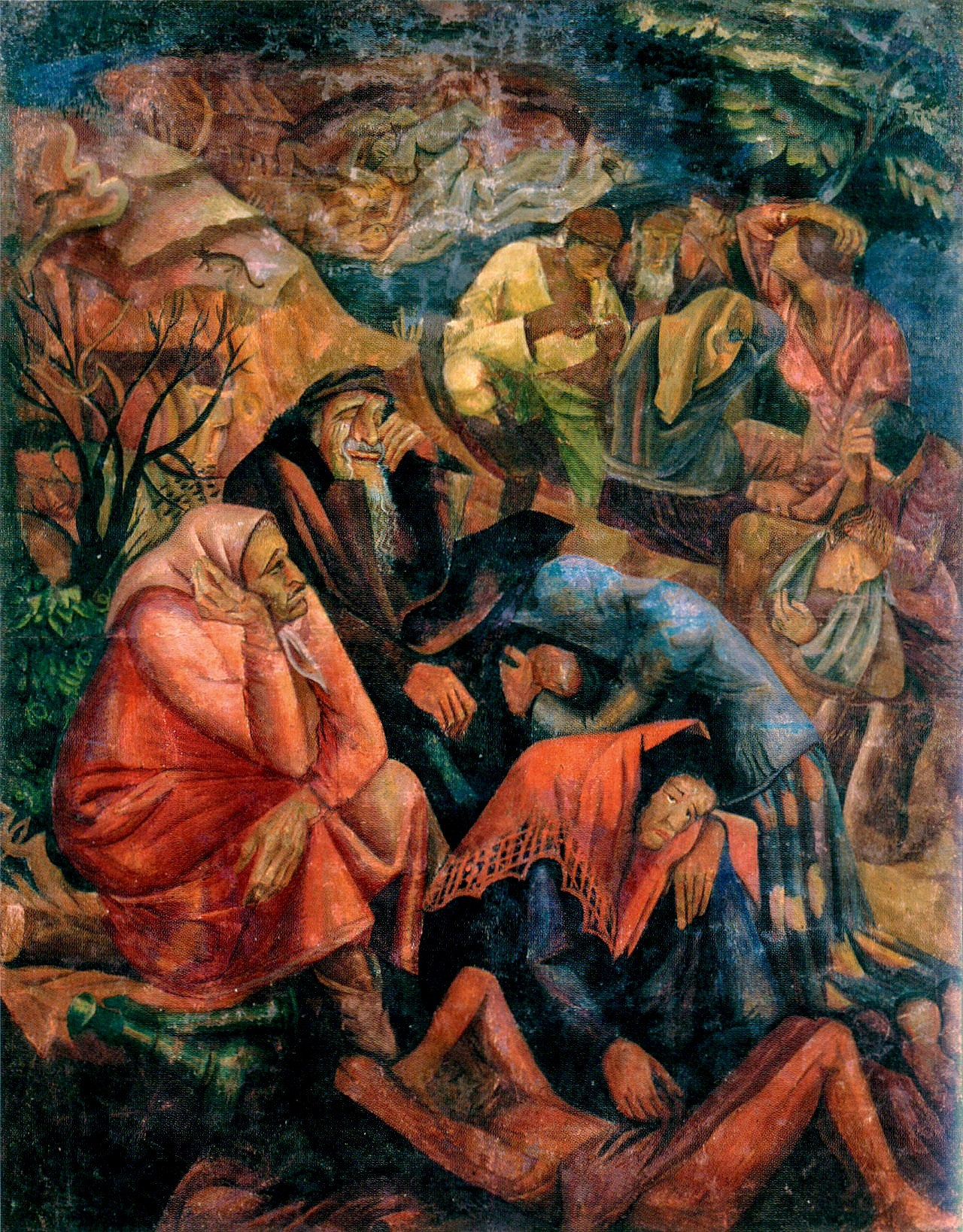
Victims of the Pogrom

Manuil Iosipovich Shechtman 2 February 1900, Lipinki, Zhytomyr Oblast - late 1941, near Moscow) was a Ukrainian painter of Jewish ancestry.

== Biography ==
He spent most of his childhood with his grandfather in Norilsk, where he studied at the local cheder. From 1913 to 1920, he attended the Kiev Art School. Following the revolution, he associated with members of Poale Zion. During that time, from 1919 to 1921, he was also involved with the "Tarbut" movement and created designs for its "Ommanut" drama school. Then, from 1922 to 1926, he worked with Mykhailo Boychuk at the National Academy of Visual Arts and Architecture and, from 1925 to 1927, was a drawing teacher at the Kiev Jewish orphanage.

In 1926, he became a member of the "Association of Revolutionary Art of Ukraine" and participated in several of their exhibitions. Two years later, with other "Boychukists" (followers of Mykhailo Boychuk), he helped decorate the peasant sanatorium in Odessa. That same year, he became head of staging at "Yugart" (the Jewish Workers' Youth Theater). This was followed by an appointment as head of the "Odessa Museum of Jewish Culture".

In the early thirties, a virulent campaign was mounted against "Boychukism". This resulted in his dismissal from all his positions and prompted a move to Moscow in 1934. He found a job as a petty bureaucrat, involved with the registration of parades and processions. In 1939, he was able to create some designs for the Moscow State Jewish Theater ("Goset").

After the start of World War II, seeing the danger that Nazism posed for the Jewish people, he volunteered with the militia and was killed in the Battle of Moscow.

His sister, Malka Shechtman, was a poet who wrote under the name "Bat-Khama" (Hebrew: בת-חמה, Daughter of Rage, or Fury). His son, Mark Shechtman, is a well-known Israeli artist.
