= Dichter =

Dichter, the German and Dutch word for poet, may refer to:

- Avi Dichter (born 1952), Israeli politician
- Benjamin Dichter (born 1975 or 1976), Canadian activist
- Ernest Dichter (1907–1991), American psychologist
- Kenny Dichter, American businessman
- Misha Dichter (born 1945), American classical pianist
- Wilhelm Dichter (born 1935), Polish-born American author

== See also ==
- Dichter des Vaderlands, an unofficial title for the Poet laureate of the Netherlands
- Dichter und Bauer (Poet and Peasant), an 1846 operetta by Franz von Suppé
