= Zolotonoshsky Uyezd =

Subdivision of the Poltava Governorate in the Russian Empire

Zolotonoshsky Uyezd Золотоноша уѣздъ
- Uezd
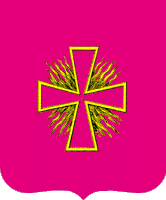
- Coat of arms

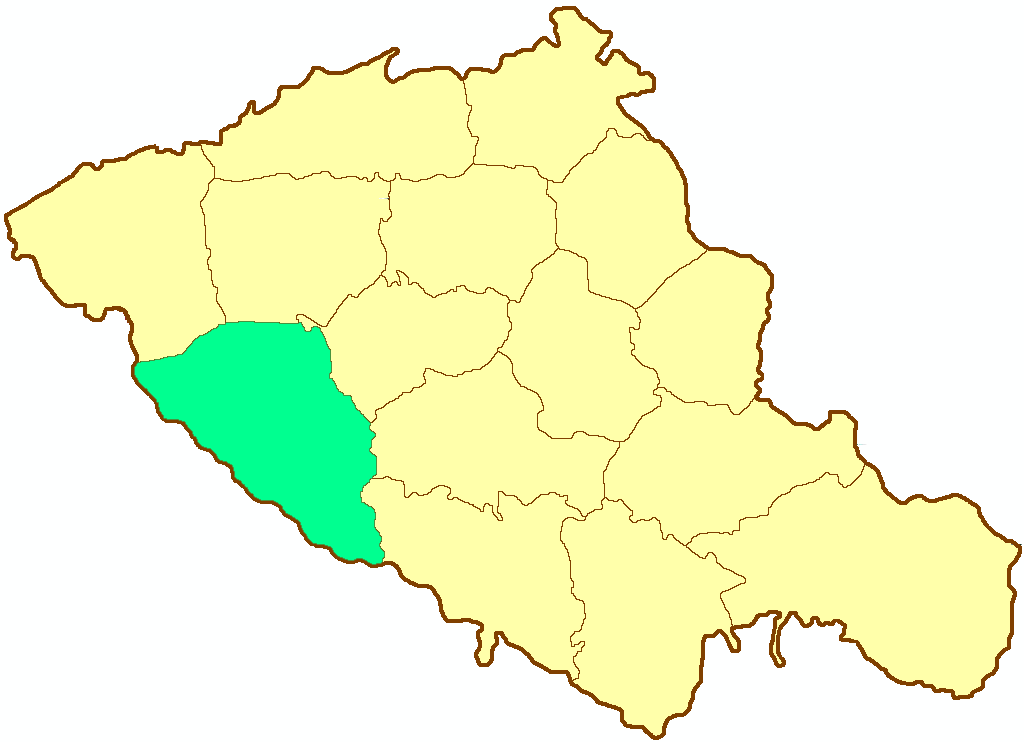
- Location in the Poltava Governorate
- Country: Russian Empire
- Governorate: Poltava
- Established: 1781
- Abolished: 1923
- Capital: Zolotonosha

Population (1897)
  - Total: 227,795

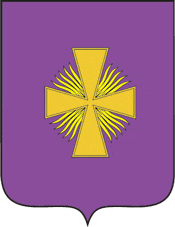
Coat of arms of Zolotonosha Ukraine

Zolotonoshsky Uyezd (Золотоношский уезд) was one of the subdivisions of the Poltava Governorate of the Russian Empire. It was situated in the western part of the governorate. Its administrative centre was Zolotonosha.

== Demographics ==
At the time of the Russian Empire Census of 1897, Zolotonoshsky Uyezd had a population of 227,795. Of these, 95.5% spoke Ukrainian, 3.4% Yiddish, 0.9% Russian and 0.1% Polish as their native language.
