= Tymofiy Boychuk =

Ukrainian painter (1896–1922)

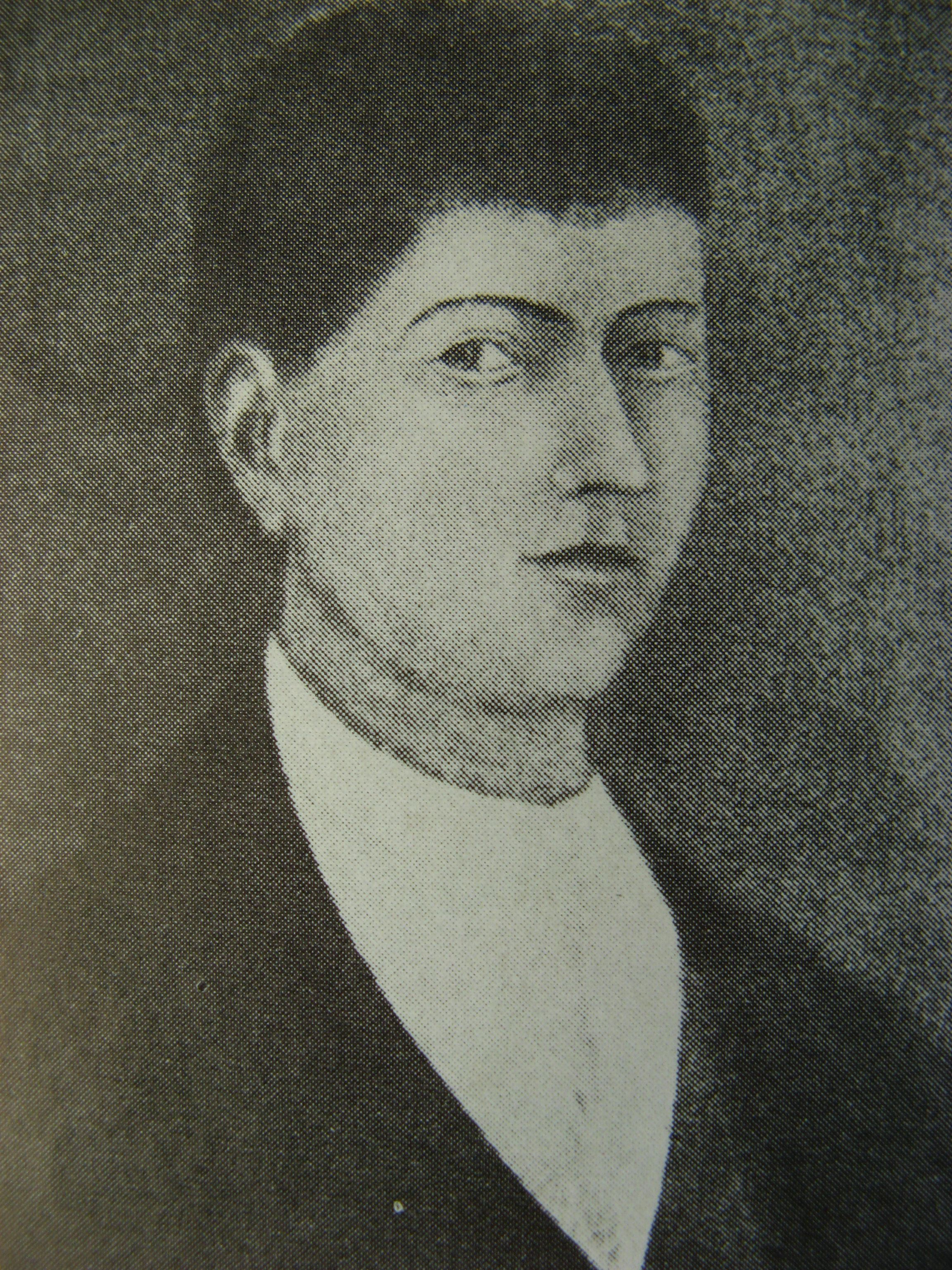
Self-portrait

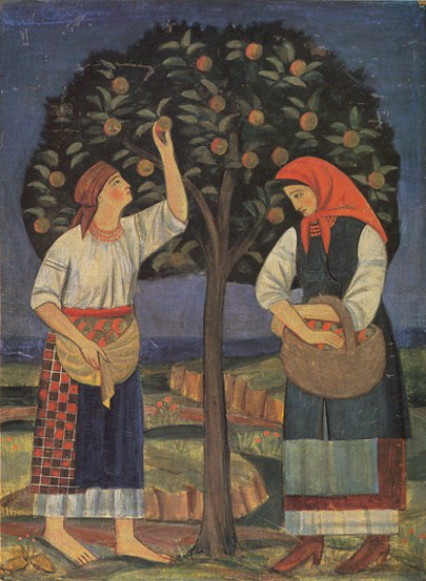
Women at the Apple Tree

Tymofiy Lvovych Boychuk, sometimes called Tymko (Ukrainian: Тимофій (Тимко) Львович Бойчук; 27 September 1896, Romanivka, now in Ternopil Raion — 13 July 1922, Kyiv) was a Ukrainian painter. His older brother was the artist, Mykhailo Boychuk.

== Biography ==
He was born to a peasant family. In 1914, his brother Mykhailo brought him to Kyiv. Having displayed a talent for drawing at an early age, he was soon put to work as an assistant for Mykhailo who, since 1912, had been working with the Imperial Russian Archaeological Society to restore paintings and frescoes at Three Saints' Church in Lemeshy.

As World War I progressed, the two brothers (who were officially Austrian citizens) were relocated to the northeast; first in Uralsk, then Arzamas. They were released at the beginning of the Revolution and allowed to return to Kyiv.

After the creation of the Ukrainian State Academy of Arts, Mykhailo organized a workshop with a school and included Timofey in his staff. It was there that he began distinguishing himself as a painter; becoming especially well known for his portraits and political posters. Later, his early portrayals of peasant life, painted with tempera on boards, would become his best remembered works. They reflected influences from Byzantine art, icon painting a Ukrainian folk art. He also provided illustrations for children's books.

He died at the age of twenty-six, of unspecified causes, just as he was beginning to have some influence on the local art community.

His frescoes at the National Opera of Ukraine have been preserved, but most of his works were destroyed during the campaign against Boychukism, which was part of the Great Purge.
