= Sofiya Nalepinska-Boychuk =

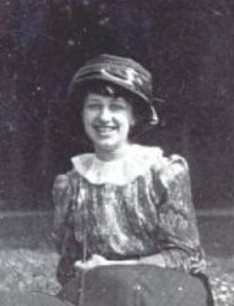
- Sofiya Nalepinska-Boychuk prior to 1910
- Born: 30 July 1884; Łódź, Congress Poland
- Died: 11 December 1937 (aged 53); Kyiv, Soviet Union
- Education: Jan Ciągliński, Simon Hollósy, Félix Vallotton, Maurice Denis
- Alma mater: Warsaw School of Drawing; Académie Ranson
- Known for: Graphic art, woodcuts
- Notable work: Engravings for Taras Shevchenko's "Kateryna" and "I Was Thirteen Years Old"
- Movement: Boychukism
- Spouse: Mykhailo Boychuk
- Memorials: Name engraved on the Monument to Repressed Artists, National Academy of Fine Arts and Architecture (Ukraine), 1996. Victim of the Executed Renaissance.

Sofiya Oleksandrivna Nalepinska-Boychuk (Note: Ukrainian: Софія Олександрівна Налепинська-Бойчук; the surname is sometimes given as Нелепинська-Бойчук or Налепінська-Бойчук) (30 July 1884 – 11 December 1937) was a Polish-born Ukrainian artist, now largely known for her woodcuts.

== Biography ==
She was born in Poland. Her father was a railway engineer and her mother was a pianist. In 1890, her father was transferred to St.Petersburg and she received her first art lessons from the Polish painter, Jan Ciągliński. Later, she took private lessons in Munich, from the Hungarian painter, Simon Hollósy. She completed her studies in 1909 in Paris, at the Académie Ranson, where she worked with Félix Vallotton and Maurice Denis. While there, she met the Ukrainian artist, Mykhailo Boychuk. After a tour of Italy with him and a friend, she returned to Galicia and became involved in the local art community.

She did, however, maintain contact with Boychuk and, in 1917, they were married in Kyiv. She learned Ukrainian and assimilated the culture quickly. They had a son in 1918. From 1919 to 1922, she worked at an art school in Mirgorod, then became head of the xylography workshop at the Kyiv Institute of Plastic Arts (after 1924, the Kyiv Art Institute, now the National Academy of Visual Arts and Architecture). She was there until 1929.

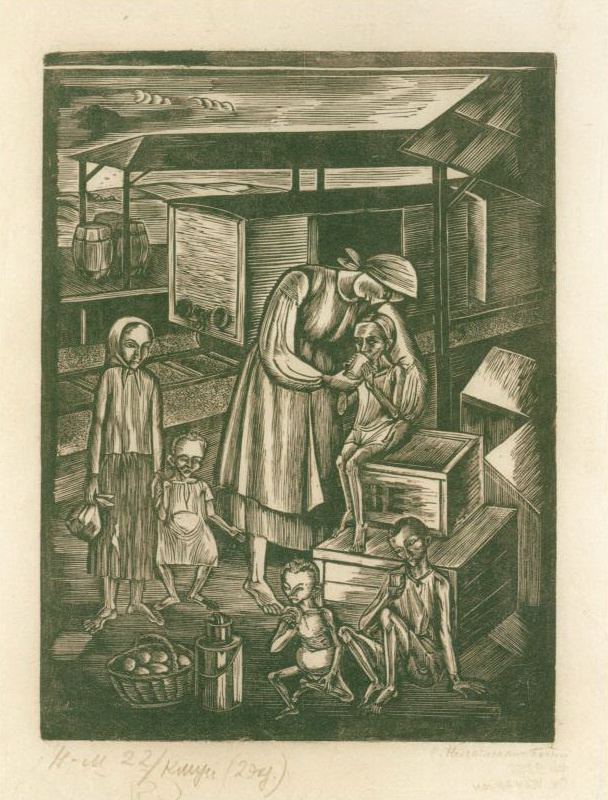
Hunger, a scene from the Holodomor

In 1936, she and her husband were arrested on charges of espionage and counterrevolutionary activities. The following year, they were executed by firing squad; in December and July, respectively.

Much of her work was in the form of wood engravings for book illustrations, including works by Taras Shevchenko, Dmitry Mamin-Sibiryak and Stepan Vasylchenko. During the Ukrainian War of Independence, she created designs for paper money and government securities. They were exhibited in 1932, but were never used.

In 1988, she was rehabilitated. In 1996, her name was among the forty inscribed on the Monument of Repressed Artists at the National Academy.
