= Vasily Sedlyar =

Ukrainian painter and illustrator (1899–1937)

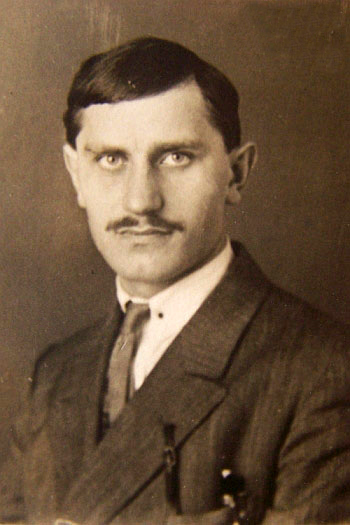
Vasyl Sedliar (c.1930)

Vasyl Teofanovych Sedliar (Ukrainian: Васи́ль Теофанович Седля́р: 12 April 1899, Khristyvka, Myrhorod Raion — 13 July 1937, Kyiv) was a Ukrainian painter, illustrator and art teacher; executed in the Great Purge. He was also known for his ceramic and faience work.

== Biography ==
He was born to a peasant farming family. From 1915 to 1919, he studied at the Kyiv Art School then, from 1919 to 1923, at the Ukrainian State Academy of Arts under Mykhailo Boychuk. He later became one of Boychuk's closest associates.

He was one of the founders of the Association of Revolutionary Art of Ukraine (ARMU) and held several teaching positions: at the mezhyhirska Art and Ceramics College (1923-1928), the Technological Institute of Ceramics and Glass (1928-1930) and the National Academy (then known as the Kyiv Art Institute, 1930-1936).

Among his best known works were the murals at the Chervonozavodsk State Ukrainian Drama Theater, which were later destroyed.

He was arrested at his home in Kharkiv by the NKVD, in 1936, on charges of espionage and counterrevolutionary activities; based on a trip to Germany, France and Italy that he had taken with Boychuk in 1927. He was taken to a prison in Kyiv, confessed under torture and was executed by firing squad on 13 July 1937, along with Boychuk and the painter Ivan Padalka. He was rehabilitated in 1958.

In 2009 the publishing house, Dukh i Litera, issued a new edition of Kobzar by Taras Shevchenko, with all eighteen of Sedliar's original illustrations, some in color. That same year, an exhibition of his surviving works was held at the National Art Museum of Ukraine.

== Gallery ==
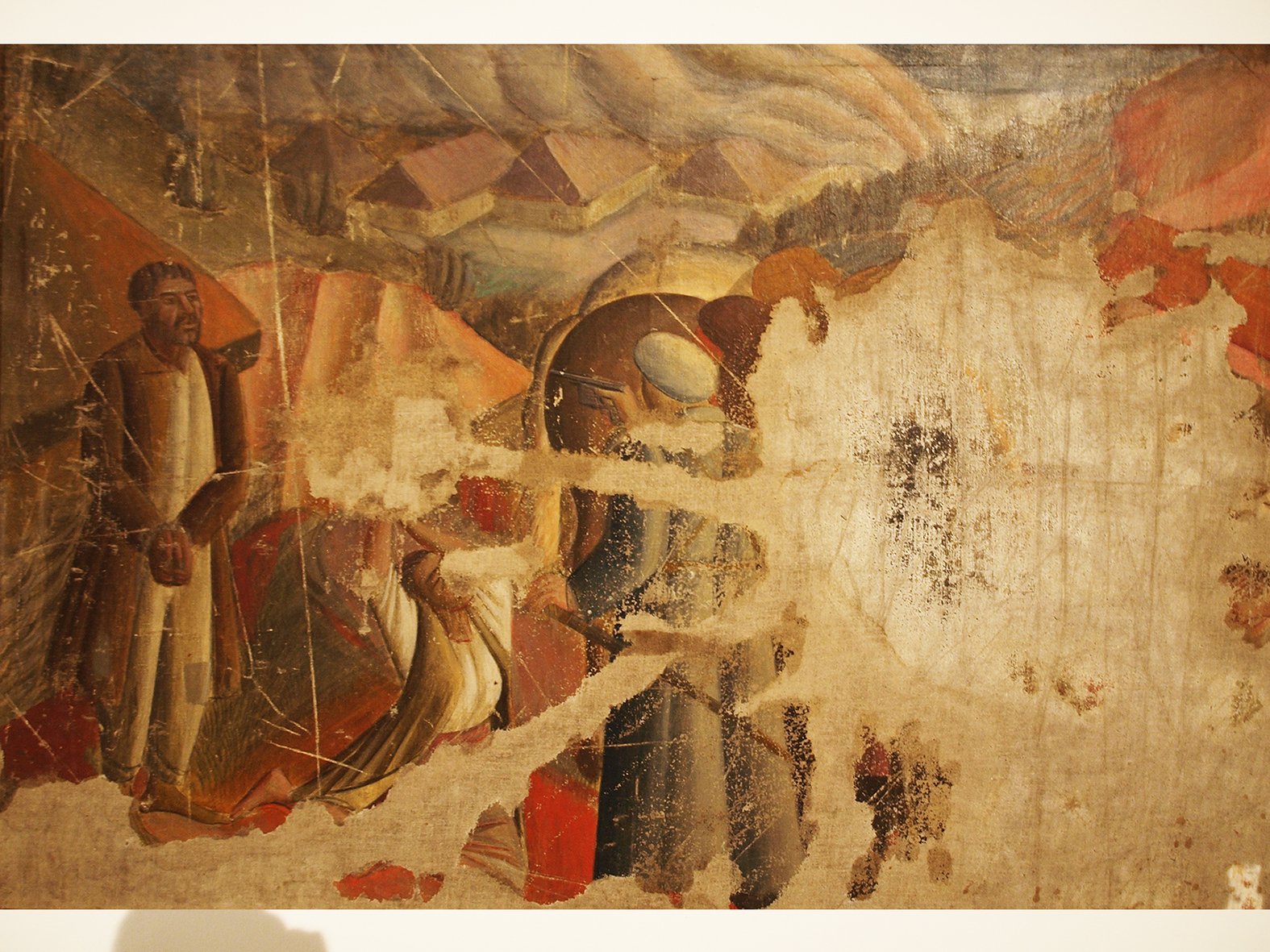
Sedlyar's half-destroyed painting "Shooting in Mezhyhirya" - Canvas, tempera - (1927)

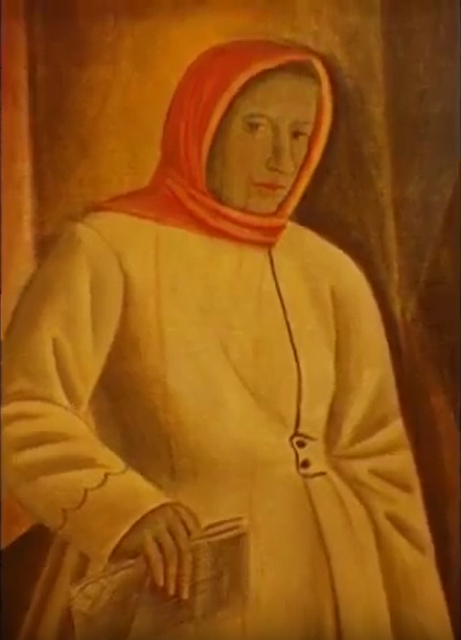
Portrait of Oksana Pavlenko (1927 - 1928)

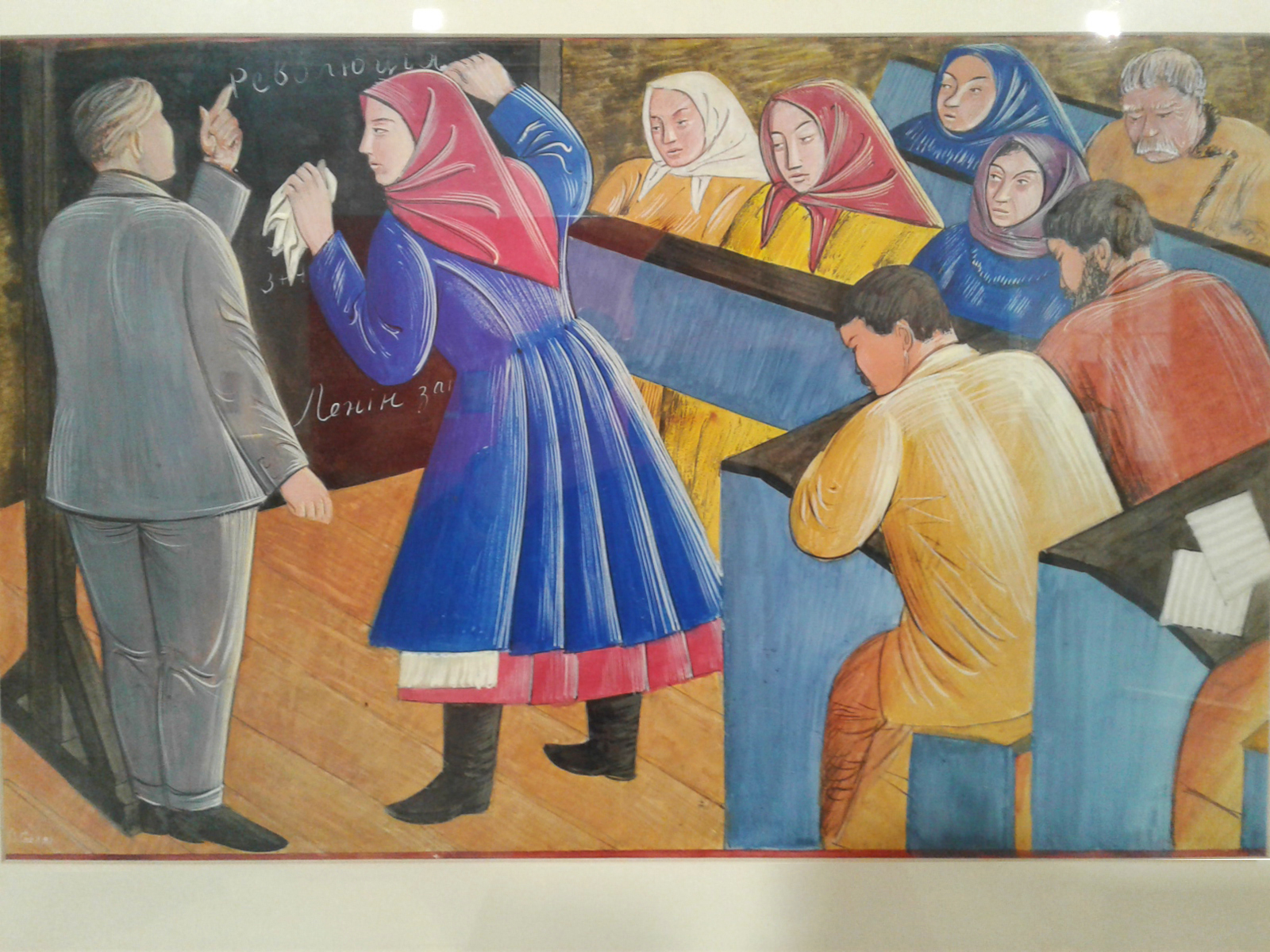
“At the school there is a problem” - Between the 1920s and 1930s

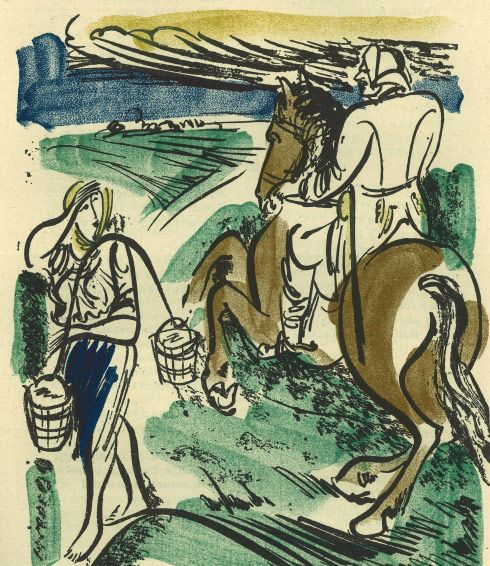
Illustration from Kobzar (between 1931 and 1933)

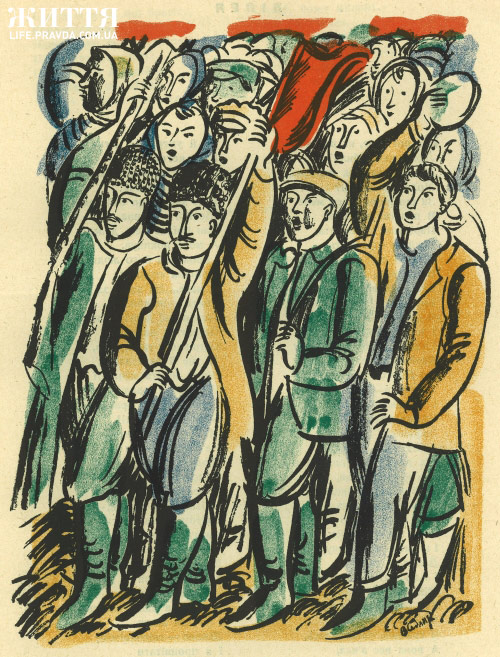
Illustration for Kobzar by Taras Shevchenko (between 1931 and 1933)
