= Mykhailo Boychuk =

Ukrainian monumentalist and modernist painter (1882–1937)

- Михайло Бойчук
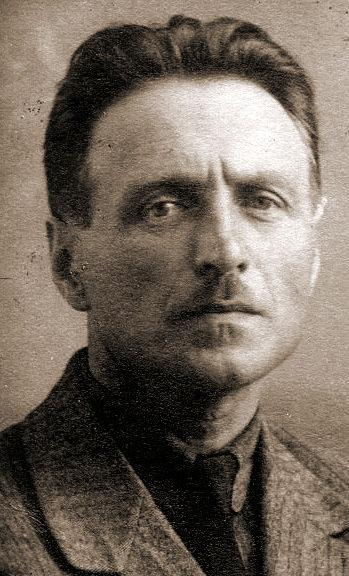
- Boychuk in the 1920s
- Born: 30 October 1882; Romanivka, Galicia and Lodomeria, Austria-Hungary (now Ukraine)
- Died: 13 July 1937 (aged 54); Soviet Union
- Style: Monumentalism; Modernism

Mykhailo Lvovych Boychuk (Ukrainian: Миха́йло Льво́вич Бойчу́к; 30 October 1882 – 13 July 1937) was a Ukrainian monumentalist and modernist painter. He is considered a representative of the generation of the Executed Renaissance.

== Biography ==
Boychuk was born in Romanivka, then in Austria-Hungary, and currently in Ternopil Oblast of Ukraine. He studied painting under Yulian Pankevych in Lviv, and subsequently in Kraków, where he graduated from the Krakow Academy of Fine Arts in 1905. He also studied at fine arts academies in Vienna and Munich. In 1905, he had his work exhibited at the Latour Gallery in Lviv and in 1907, his work was exhibited in Munich. Between 1907 and 1910 he lived in Paris where, in 1909, he founded his own studio-school. In this period, he worked with and was influenced by Félix Vallotton, Paul Sérusier and Maurice Denis. He held an exhibition at the Salon des Indépendants in 1910, featuring his and his students' works on the revival of Byzantine art. The group of Ukrainian artists who studied and worked with him was known as the Boychukists. In 1910, Boychuk returned to Lviv, where he worked as a conservator at the National Museum. In 1911, he travelled to the Russian Empire, but, after World War I started, he was interned there as an Austrian citizen. After the war, Boychuk remained in Kyiv.

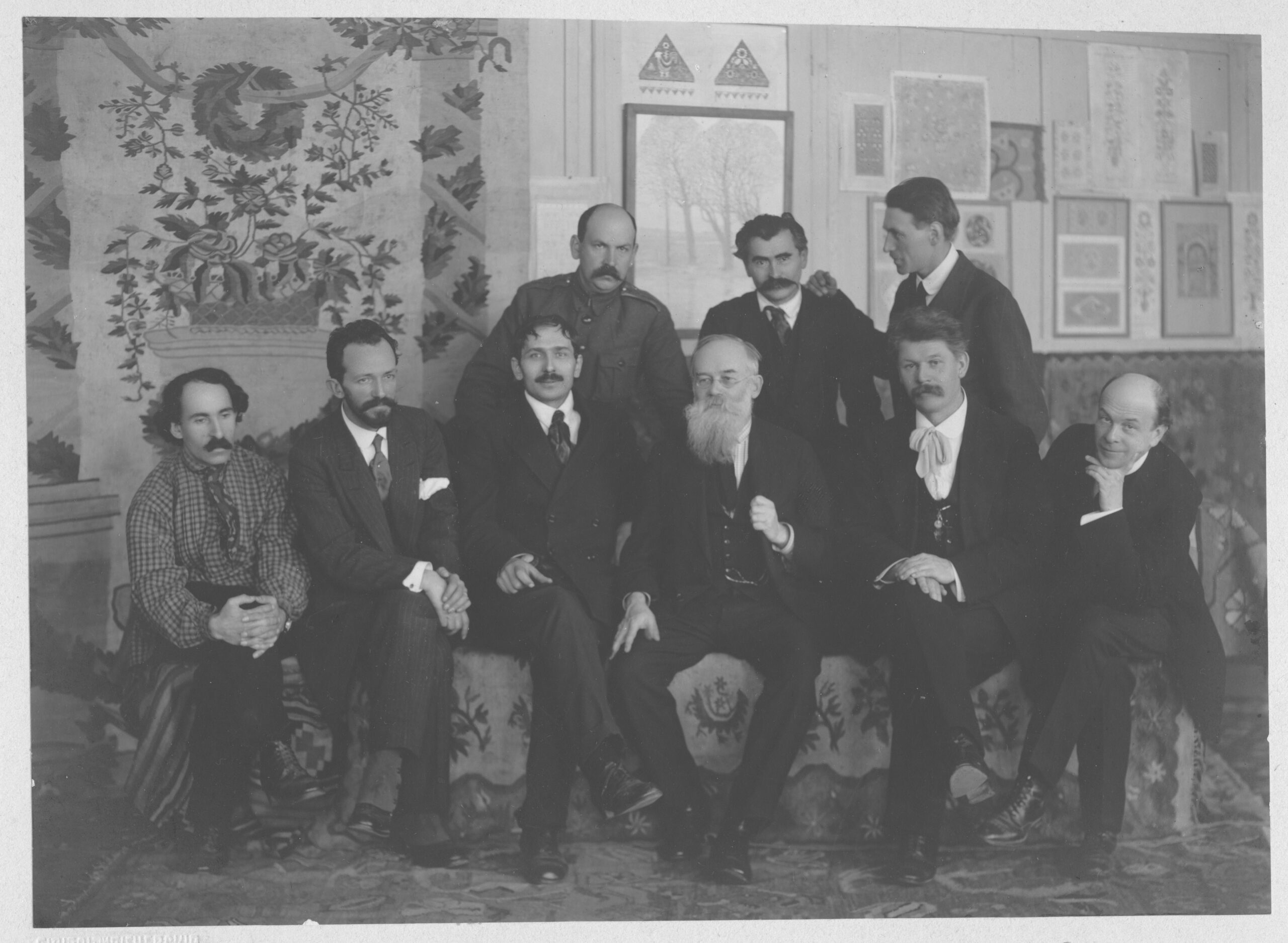
Founders of the Ukrainian academy of arts, 1917. From left, sitting: Abram Manevich, Oleksandr Murashko, Fedir Krychevsky, Mykhailo Hrushevsky, Ivan Steshenko, Mykola Burachek, standing: Heorhiy Narbut, Vasyl Krychevsky, Mykhailo Boychuk.

In 1917, he became one of the founders of the Ukrainian State Academy of Arts, where he taught fresco and mosaic, and in 1920 was a rector. In 1925, he co-founded the Association of Revolutionary Art of Ukraine. At the time, he already performed a number of high-profile monumental works, and formed a school of monumental painters which existed until his death. The school included renowned artists such as his brother Tymofiy Boychuk and Ivan Padalka.

Due to the Great Purge, the Association of Revolutionary Art of Ukraine was disestablished, and Boychuk was executed. His wife, Sofiia Nalepinska, also an artist, was executed several months after Boychuk.

== Works ==
Many of the works by Boychuk, which mainly involved frescoes and mosaics, were destroyed after he was executed. Even his paintings which were kept in museums of Lviv, were destroyed after World War II. The main projects carried out or coordinated by Boychuk and his school—which included his brother Tymofiy Boychuk, Ivan Padalka, Vasily Sedlyar, Sofiia Nalepinska, Mykola Kasperovych, Oksana Pavlenko, Antonina Ivanova, Mykola Rokytsky, Kateryna Borodina, Oleksandr Myzin, Kyrylo Hvozdyk, Pavlo Ivanchenko, Serhii Kolos, Okhrym Kravchenko, Hryhorii Dovzhenko, Onufrii Biziukov, Mariia Kotliarevska, Ivan Lypkivsky, Vira Bura-Matsapura, Yaroslava Muzyka, Oleksandr Ruban, Olena Sakhnovska, Manuil Shekhtman, Mariia Trubetska, Kostiantyn Yeleva, and Mariia Yunak — are an important contribution to Ukrainian and world art.

Right after the 1917 October Revolution, Boychuk and a group of students after his direction made frescoes for the Kyiv Theater of Opera and Ballet (1919), the Kharkiv Opera Theater (1921), the Ukrainian SSR's pavilion at the First All-Russian Cottage Industry and Agriculture Exhibition in Moscow, and the Kyiv Co-operative Institute (1923). Later, he switched to the socialist realism style, in which the main works of his group were the Peasant Sanatorium in Odessa (1927–28) and the Kharkiv Chervonozavodskyi Ukrainian Drama Theater (1933–35).

Some of Boychuk's art works are stored in the National Art Museum of Ukraine.

== Selected paintings ==
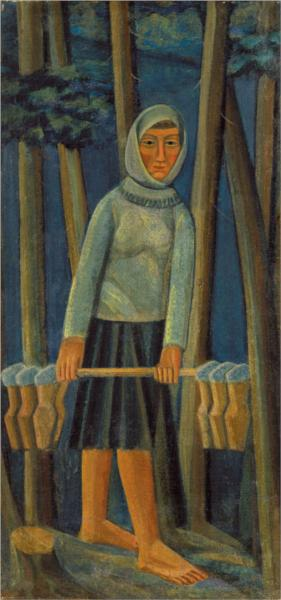
Milkmaid

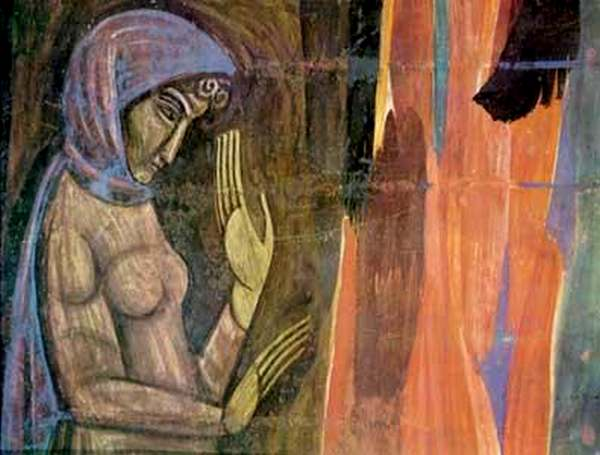
A Girl

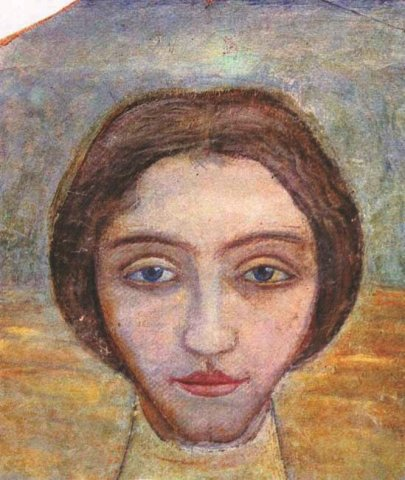
Portrait of a Woman

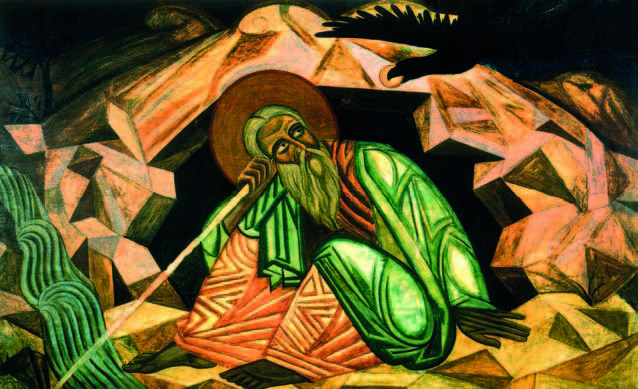
The Prophet Elijah

== See also ==
- Liubov Voloshyn
- Mariia Yunak
