= Dnipro Art Museum =

Museum in Dnipro, Ukraine

- Дніпровський художній музей
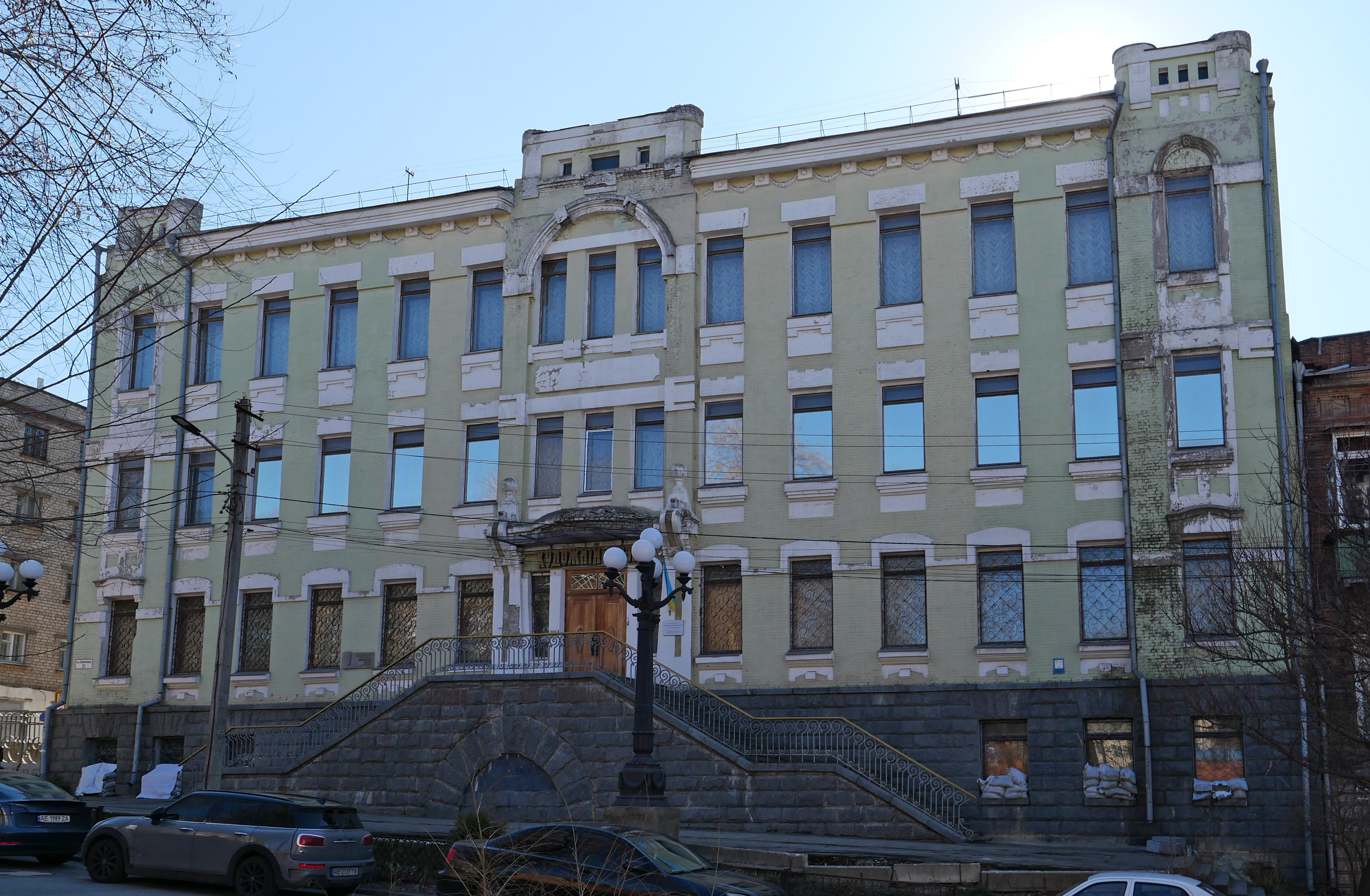
- The museum in 2023
- Former name: Katerynoslav City Art Gallery; Katerynoslav National Art Museum
- Established: 1914
- Location: 21 Shevchenka Street, Dnipro, Ukraine
- Coordinates: 48°27′26″N 35°03′18″E
- Type: Art museum
- Director: Shatiro Lyudmila (2023)
- Website: artmuseum.dp.ua

The Dnipro Art Museum (Ukrainian: Дніпровський художній музей, romanized: Dniprovskyi khudozhnii muzei) is a museum of fine arts in the city of Dnipro, Ukraine. It is among the oldest museums in Ukraine. About 8,500 paintings, drawings, sculptures, and decorative arts pieces from the 16th to the 21st centuries are part of the museum's collection.

== History ==
The Katerynoslav Scientific Society took the initiative to build the museum in 1906, and donations from artists, art collectors, the Saint Petersburg Academy of Arts, the Museum of Antiquities of Katerynoslav Gubernia, and other organizations made the museum possible. Opening in honor of Taras Shevchenko's 100th birthday in April 1914, the Katerynoslav City Art Museum intended to serve as an urban community education hub in addition to being a cultural institution. The city council purchased and restored the buildings on the grounds of the City Park (now Lazar Hloba Park), to house the museum's inaugural exhibition the night before it opened. The site was further altered by other historical occurrences connected to the First World War and the startling 1917–1921 period.

It was housed on the second floor of Khrinnikov's residence from 1922 and 1936 (currently the hotel Ukraine). In 1937, the museum's number of operations and stock collection increased, so much so that it had to relocate to a four-story building on 21 Shevchenko Street, where it remains to this day. Owing to the museum's growing volume of operations and stock collection.

The museum were closed during World War II. The building held the land surveying technical school administration as well as history and art museum displays during the city's occupation in 1941–1943. Many of the collections have survived. However a portion of the building was destroyed when a bomb struck the house's roof from the left façade during an air raid in the summer of 1941, penetrating the upper level ceiling. The artwork The Secret Departure of Ivan the Terrible, moved to the museum in 1913, was forcibly removed by the Wehrmacht during their occupation.

Following Dnipropetrovsk's liberation from Nazi occupation, repairs were made to the museum's grounds. As a result, the museum was able to reopen in 1947 and start hosting events. The Dnipropetrovsk Art School moved into the building after the land surveying technical school disbanded at the beginning of the 1960s. By the middle of the 1970s, the art school and the art museum were working side by side.

An accidental fire that started in August 1974 completely destroying the structure from the inside out. Because they were rescued in time, the museum's exhibits escaped damage, but other wooden structures and interfloor ceilings burnt. Major renovations carried out over the course of the following four years included a thorough redesign of the interior arrangement and the function of the building. The art school relocated, and the museum reopened its doors to tourists in July 1978.

== Collections ==
The museum is divided into two sections: Russian and Ukrainian art from the 17th and 18th centuries (portraits, iconography, folk art); and art from the 19th and 20th centuries. The landscape paintings by Konstantin Trutovsky, Ivan Aivazovsky, Konstantin Makovsky, Ilya Repin, I. Shyshkin, Kyriak Kostandi, Isaac Levitan, Konstantin Kryzhitsky, Serhii Vasylkivsky, Mykola Pymonenko, and Nikolay Samokish, as well as the sculptures by Vladimir Beklemishev and others are among the most valuable pieces in the museum's collection. The museum features several Soviet-era pieces by Russian painters such as Mykhailo Bozhii, Vasyl Kasiian, Ivan Znoba, and Mykola Hlushchenko.

The museum now features a collection of Soviet and contemporary Ukrainian art, as well as art from Western Europe, Russia, and Ukraine (including icons, folk paintings, portraits, landscapes, and genre paintings). The collection's primary draw is said to be the artwork of Yekaterinoslav-native symbolist and artist Mikhail Sapozhnikov. It received certain artwork that had been nationalized private collections and belonged to the National Museum of the History of Ukraine. Both decoratively applied art and visual art are on display at the museum.

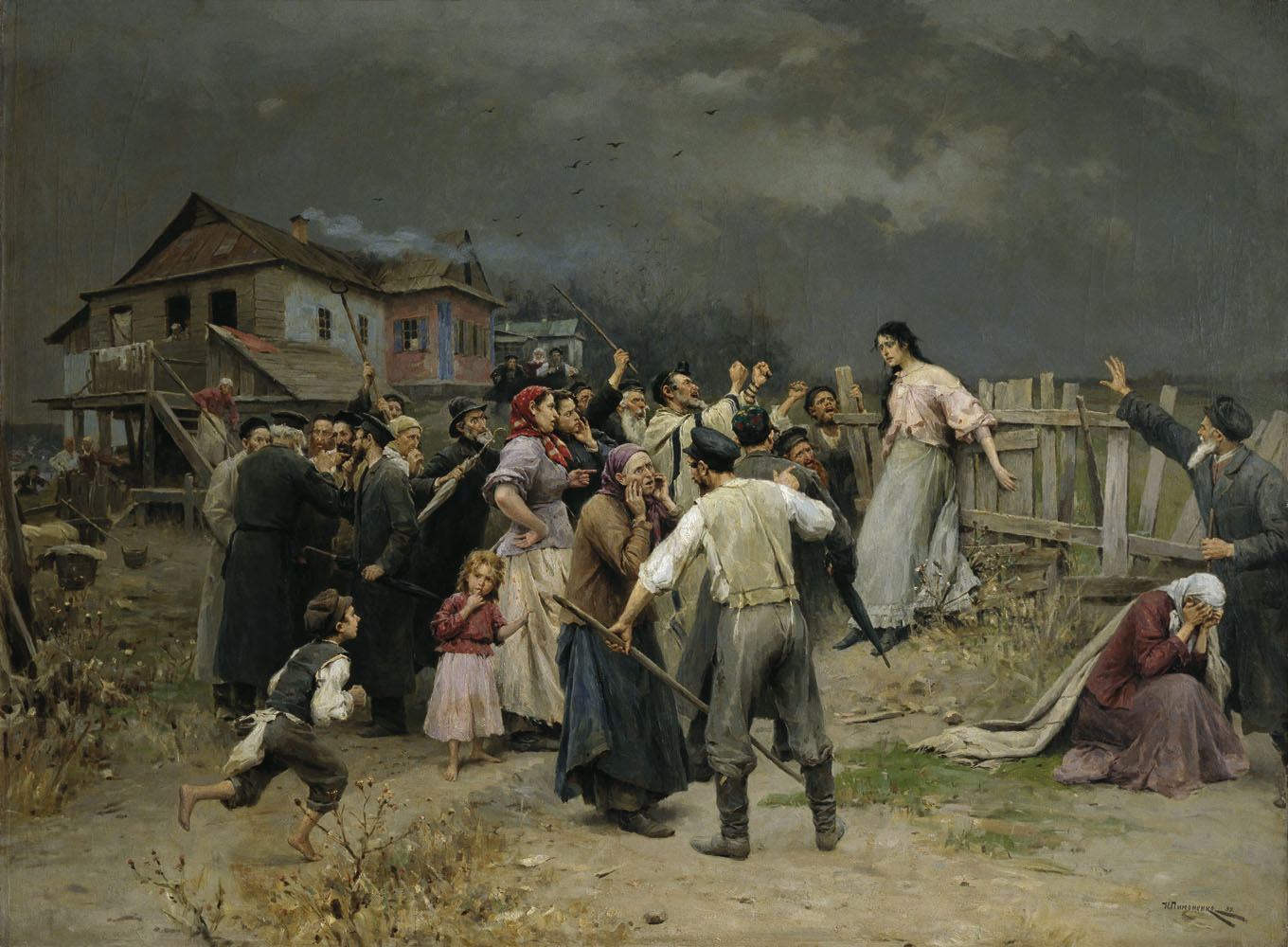
A Victim of Fanaticism by Mykola Pymonenko

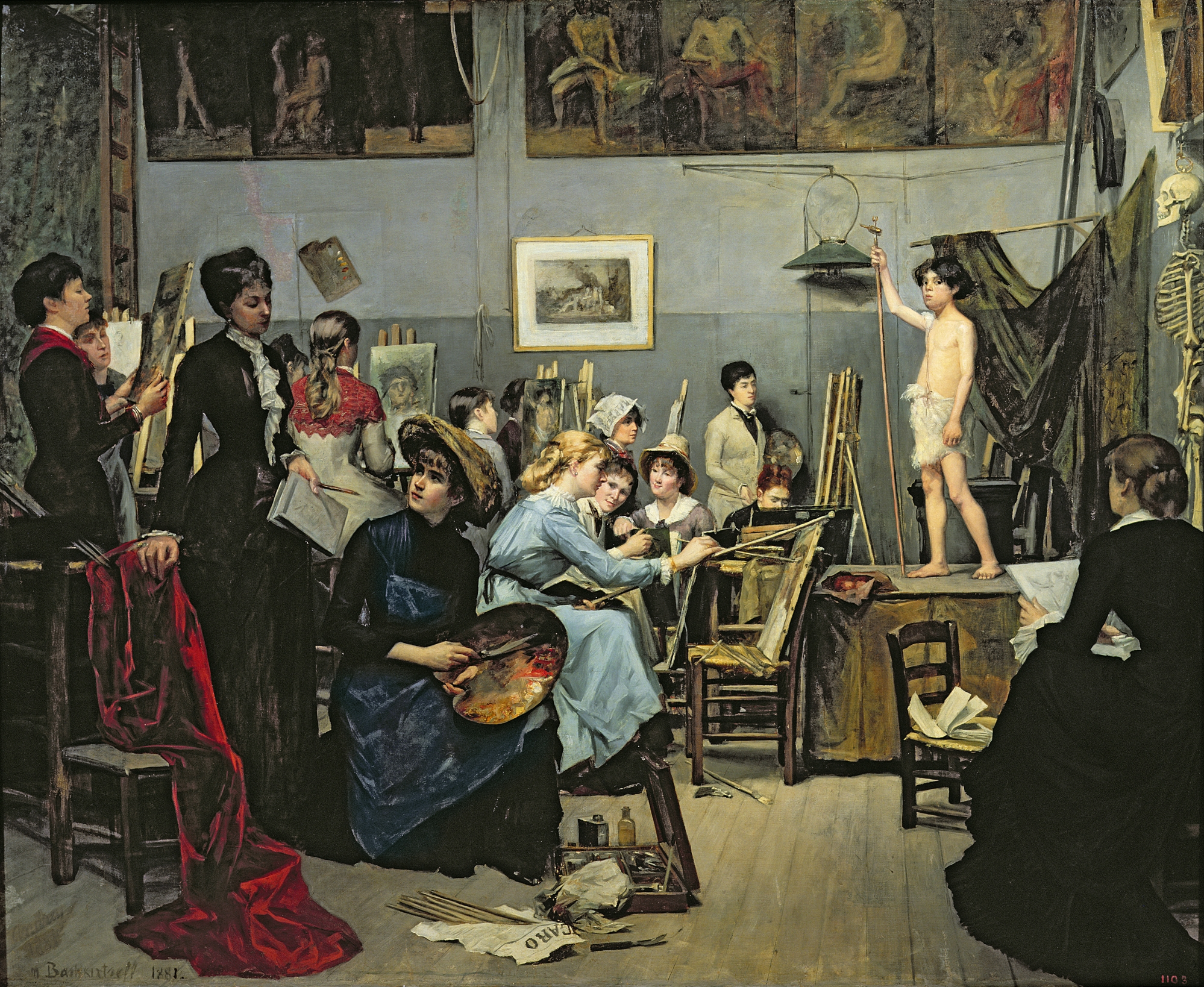
In the Studio by Marie Bashkirtseff

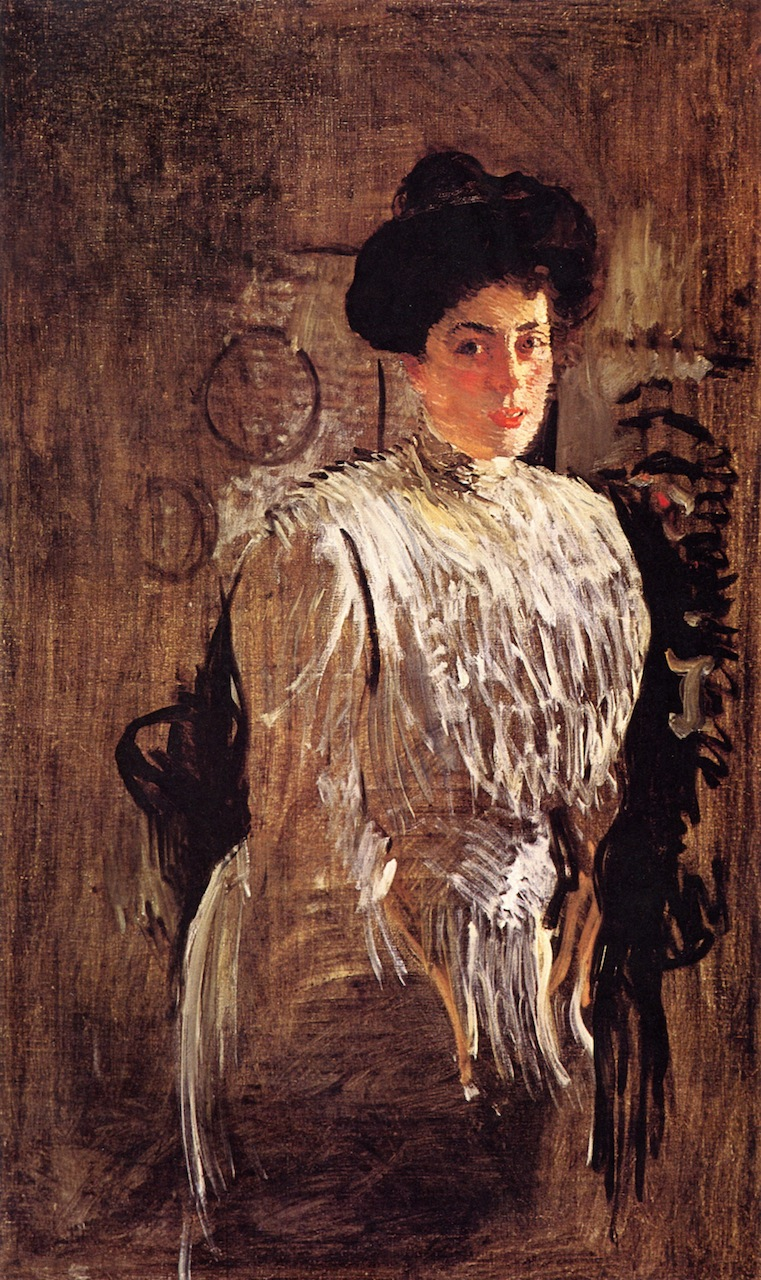
Margarita Morozova by Valentin Serov

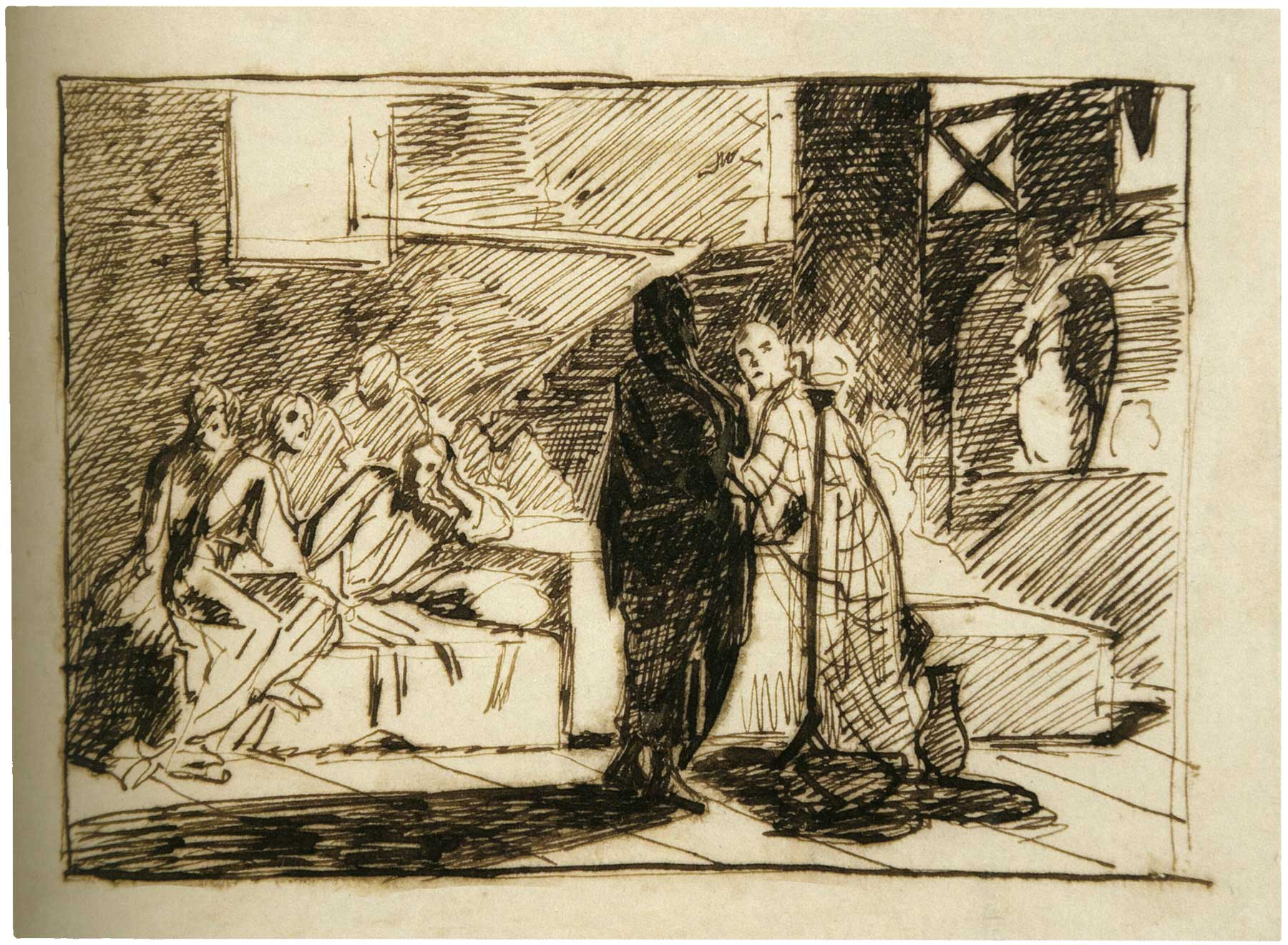
The Last Supper by Nikolai Ge

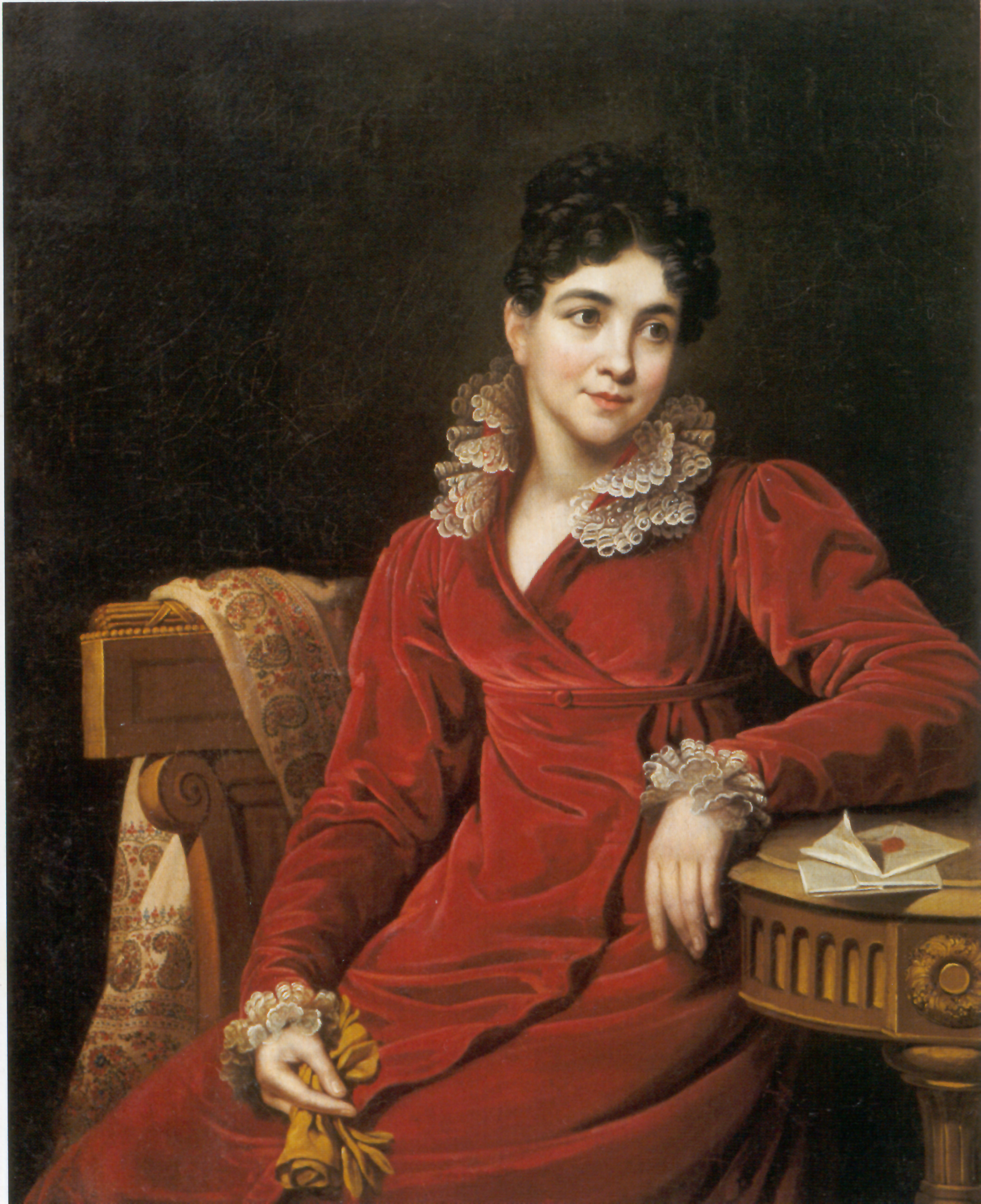
Praskovya Kutaisova by Johann Rombauer

== Gallery ==
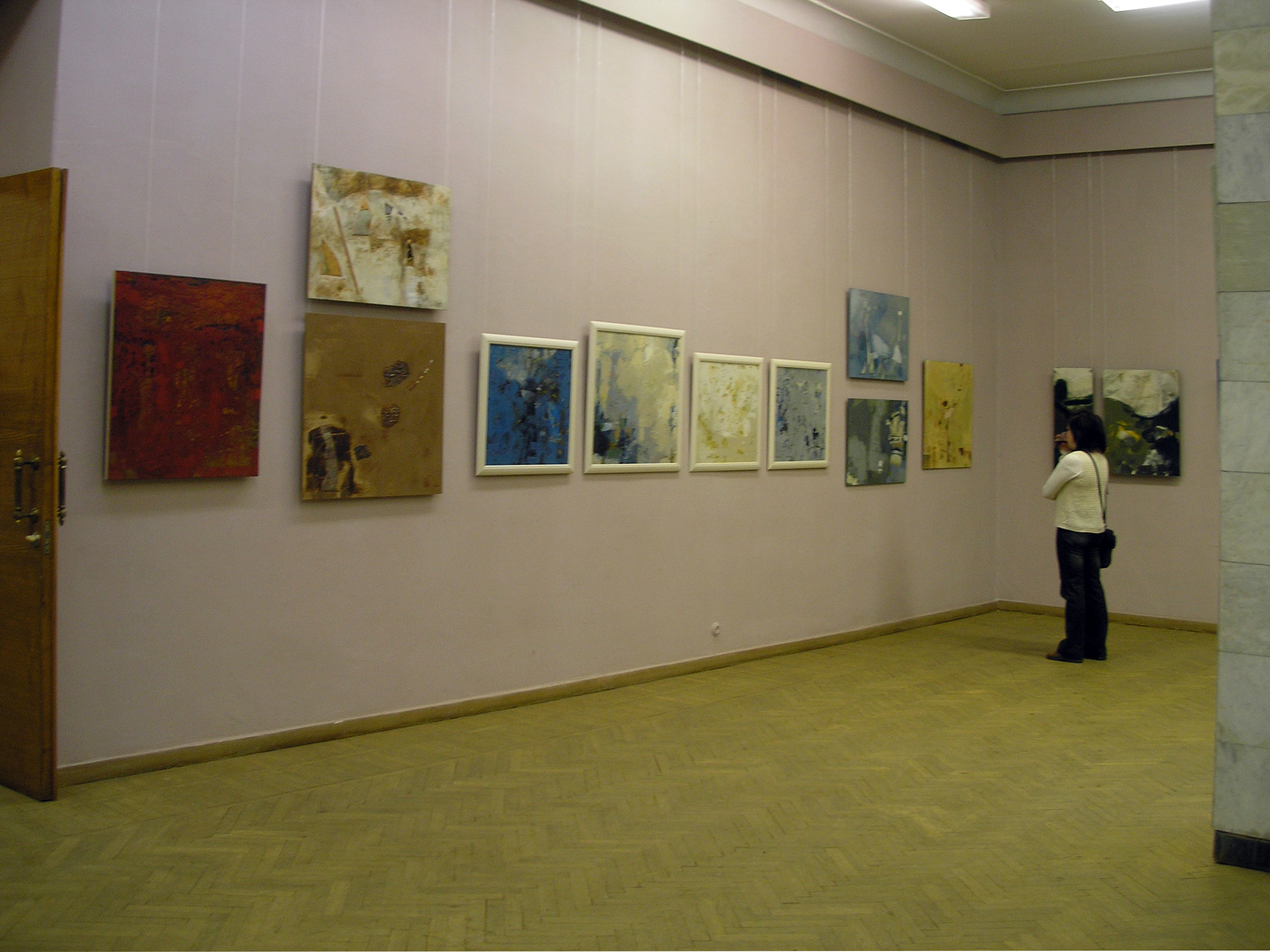
Paintings on display in 2005

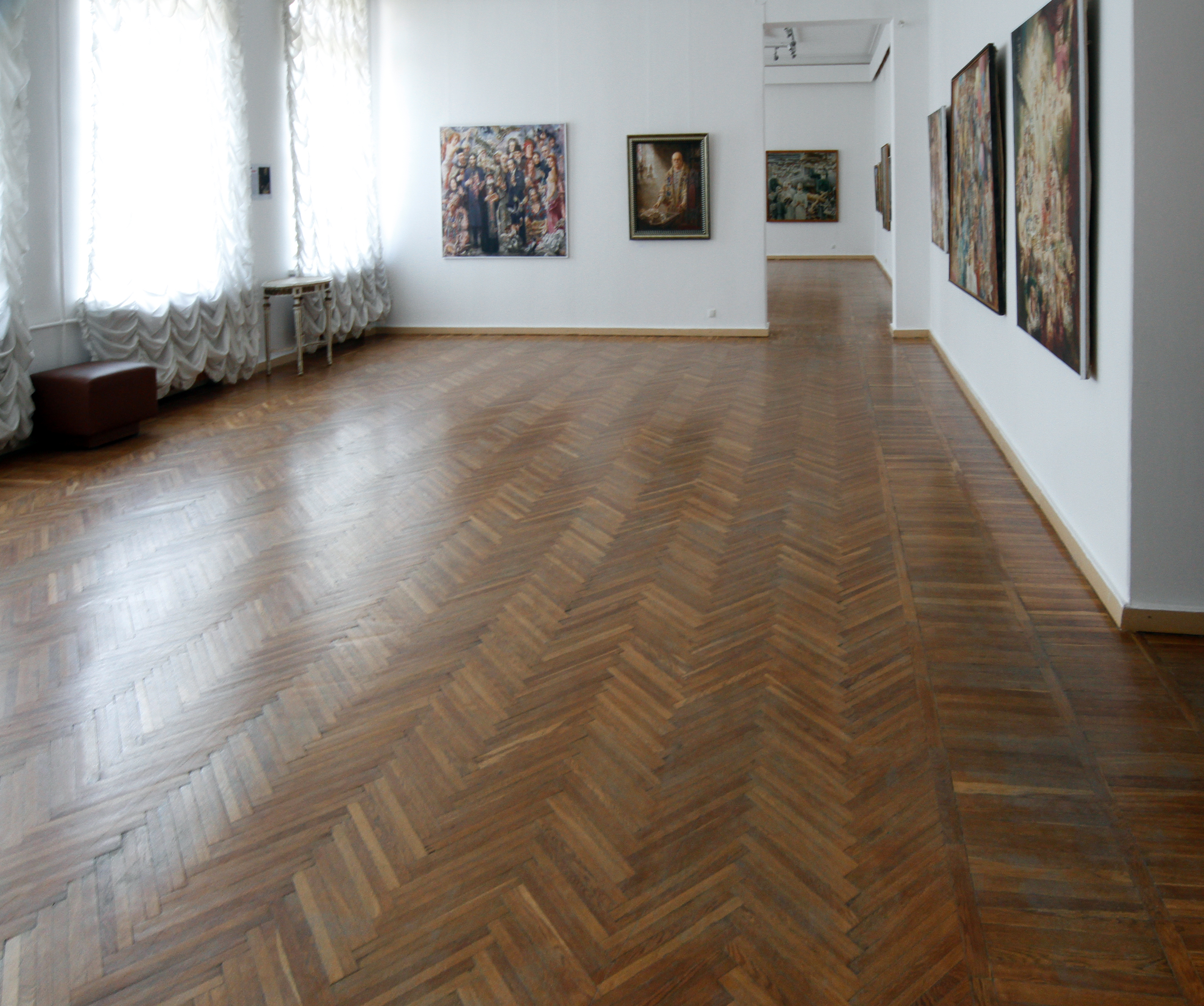
Interior of the museum in 2019

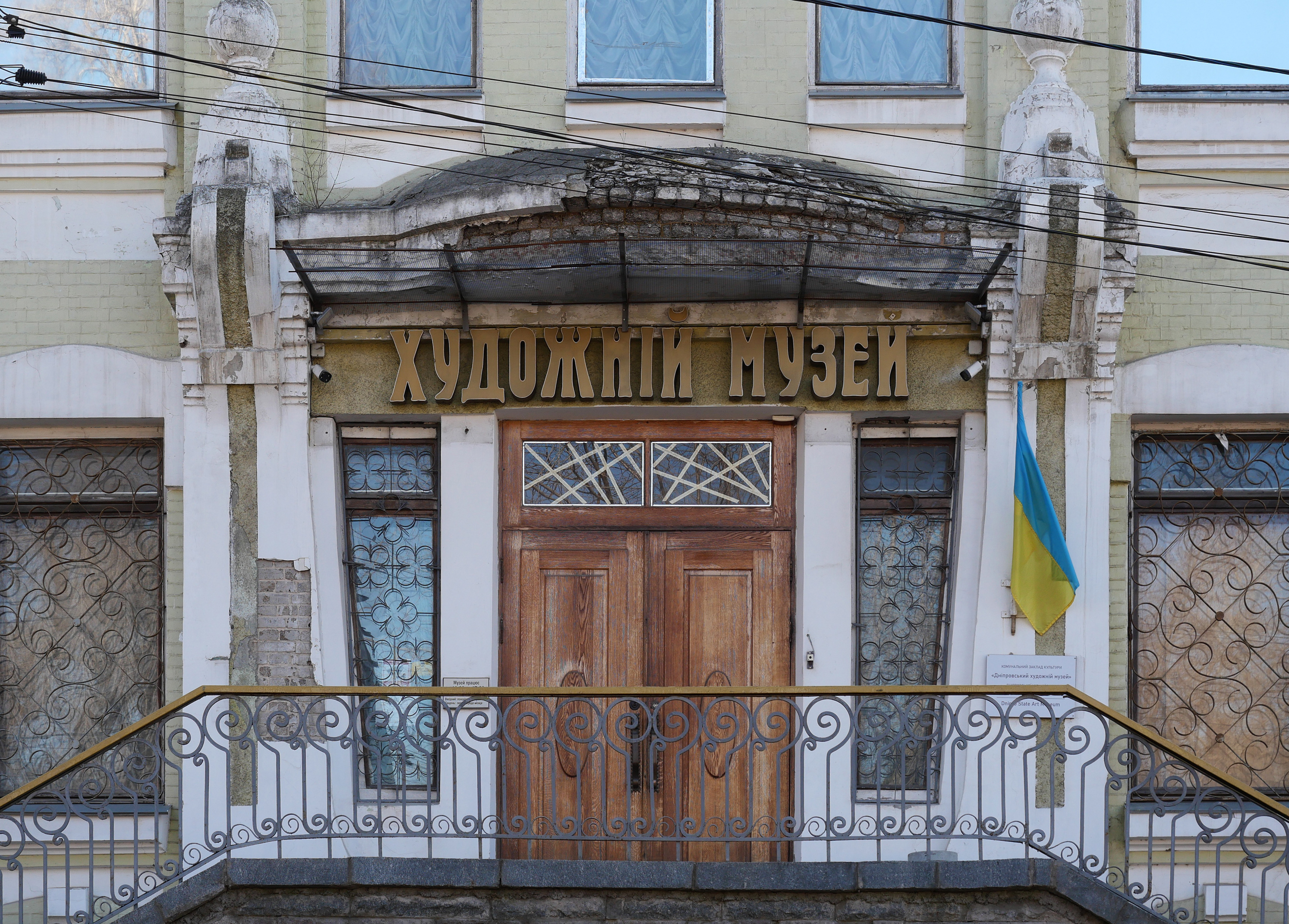
Main entrance to the museum in 2023

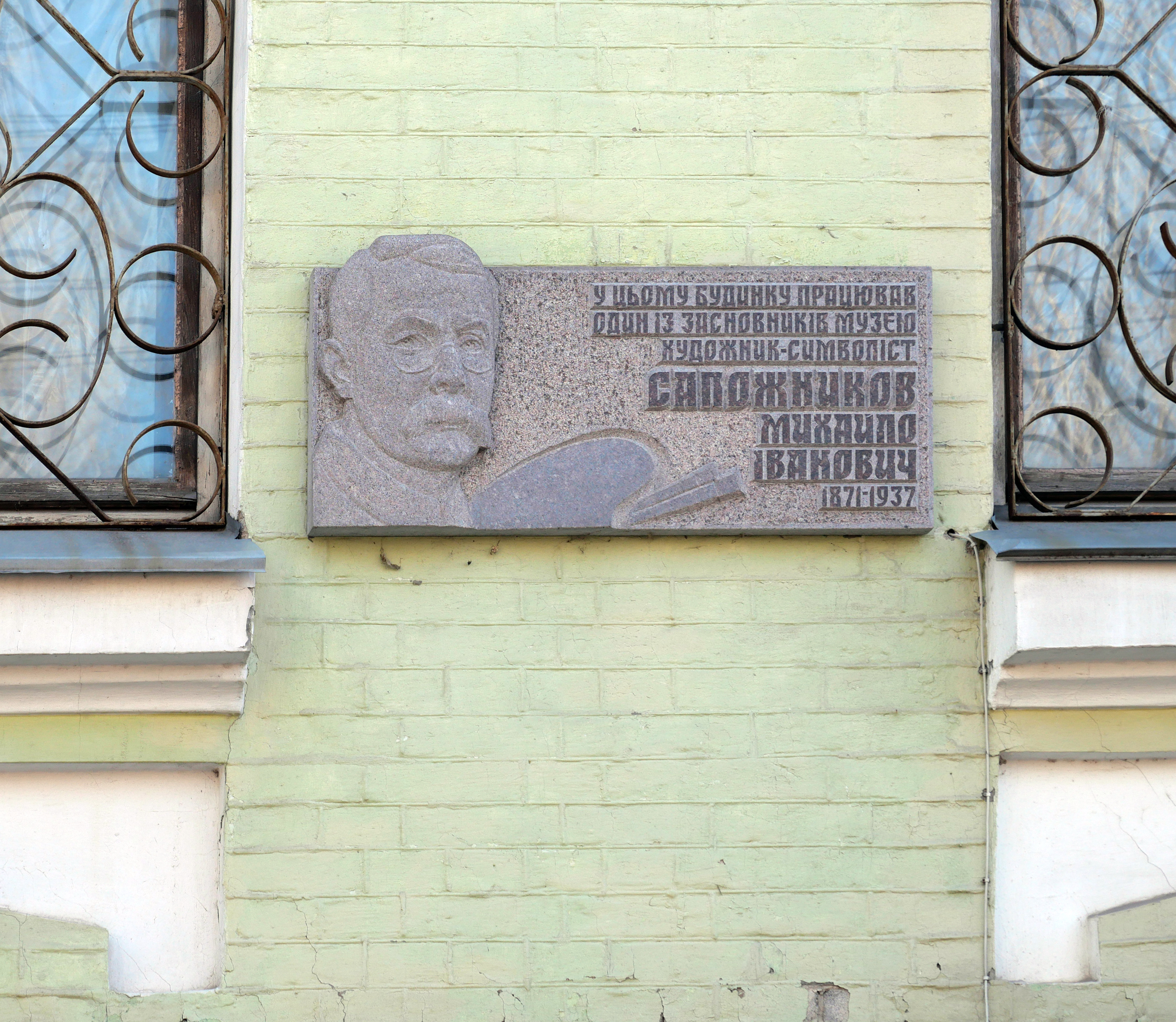
A plaque dedicated to Mikhail Sapozhnikov in 2023
