= Mykhailo Kozyk =

Ukrainian painter (1879–1947)

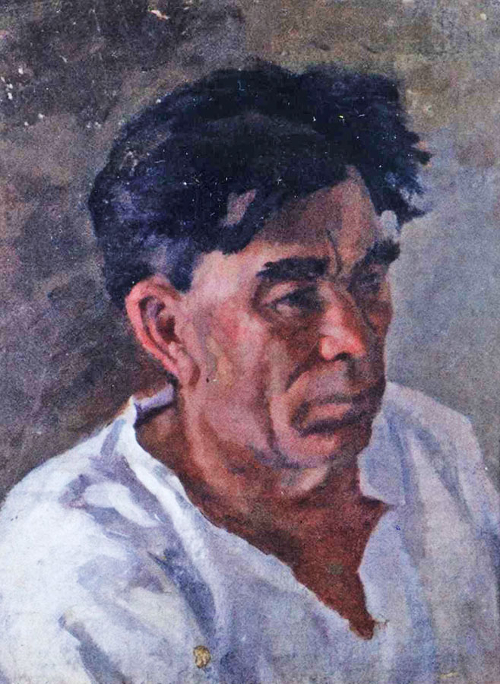
Self-portrait (c. 1930)

Mykhailo Yakymovych Kozyk (Ukrainian: Михайло Якимович Козик; 20 September 1879 – 2 January 1947) was a Ukrainian painter and art teacher.

== Biography ==
Kozyk was born in Semenivka into a large peasant family. His father noticed and encouraged his artistic skills, so from 1897 to 1904, he was able to study at the icon painting school in the Kyiv Pechersk Lavra. The primary teacher there, Ivan Yizhakevych, selected him to work on the iconostasis at the Church of Saints Boris and Gleb. In 1904, he passed the entrance exam for the Kyiv Art School, where he studied with Hryhoriy Dyadchenko and Mykola Pymonenko.

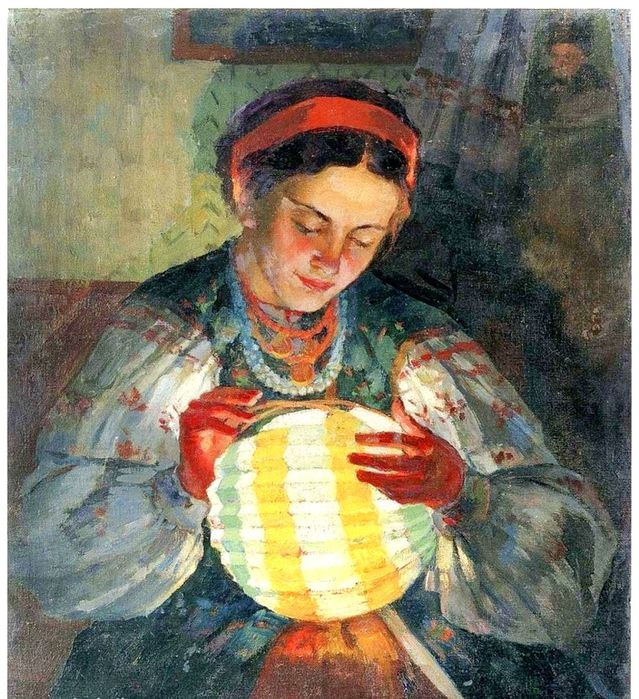
Young Girl with a Lantern

During the Revolution of 1905, Kozyk passed out revolutionary leaflets. Later that year, he was expelled from school, due to his participation in a student strike. He returned to his home town and, the following year, was arrested at a Social Democratic rally. He managed to escape from prison and went into hiding. When it was relatively safe, he joined a group of artists who were decorating Transfiguration Cathedral in Bila Tserkva.

In 1907, Kozyk was allowed to return to the art school, where he studied with Ivan Seleznyov, in addition to Dyadchenko and Pymonenko. Two years later, he was awarded a certificate for teaching art in secondary schools. He then went to Moscow, where he enrolled at the School of Painting, Sculpture and Architecture. His primary instructors there were Konstantin Korovin and Leonid Pasternak. Kozyk graduated in 1913 as an "Artist of the First Degree". That same year, he began participating in exhibitions.

From 1915 to 1925, he was a teacher at his alma mater, the Kyiv Art School. After becoming a professor, he worked at the Kyiv Art Institute until 1932. He then moved to the Kharkiv Art Institute, where he taught until 1941. During Operation Barbarossa, the Institute was relocated to Samarkand, but Kozyk remained in Kharkiv, taking charge of what was left in an effort to preserve it. In 1943 he left Kharkiv to teach at the Lviv Art and Industrial School.

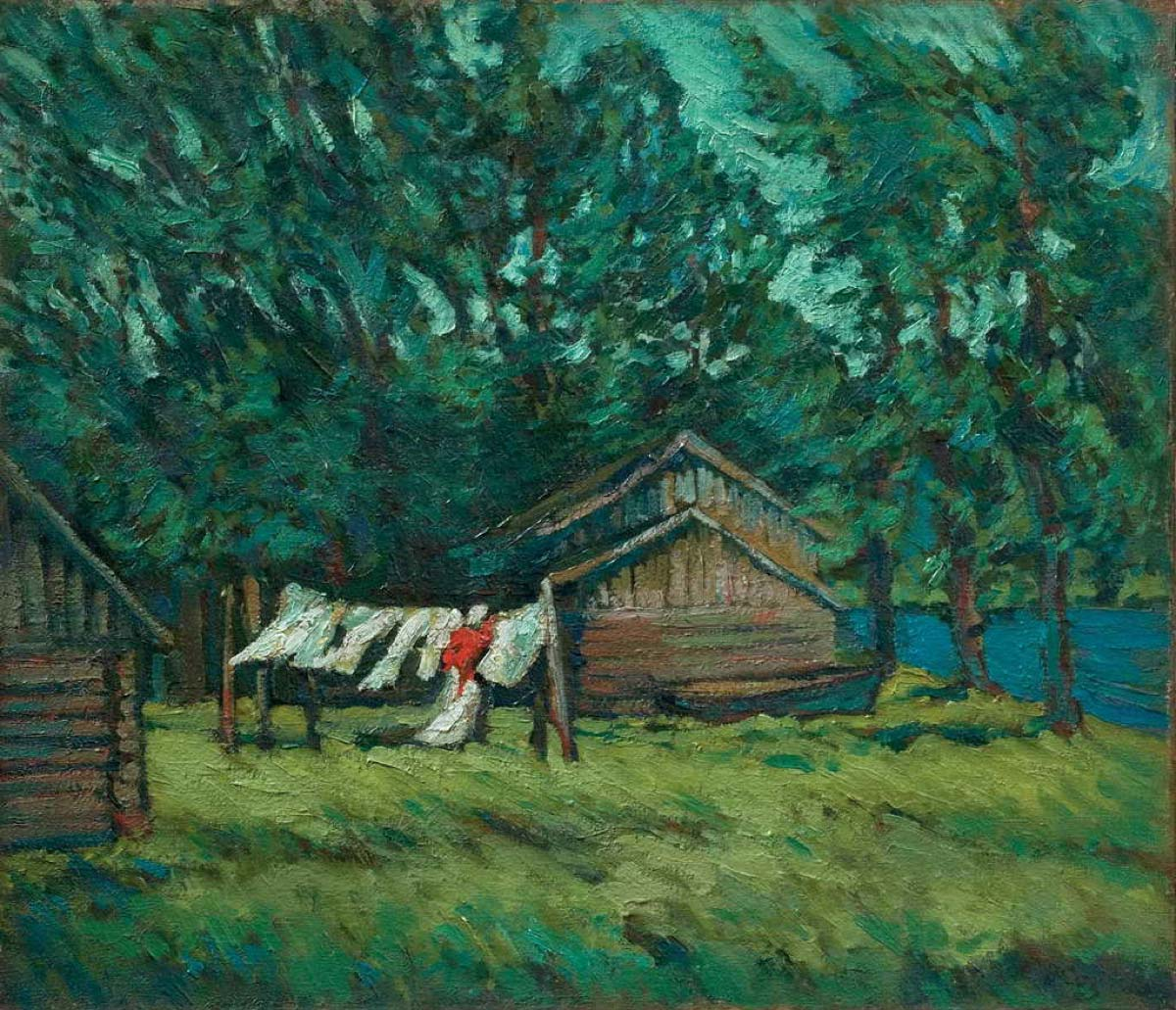
Houses Near the River

Kozyk spent his final years in Lviv, persona non grata for remaining in Kharkiv during the Reichskommissariat Ukraine. He died in Lviv in 1947, and his reputation was not fully rehabilitated until 1973. The Lviv Museum of Ukrainian Art held a major retrospective of his work in 1979, and a street in Lviv has been named after him.

== See also ==
- Liubov Voloshyn
- Icon painting in Ukraine

== Sources ==
- "Mykhailo Kozik: Years of Creative Development" by Lyubov Voloshyn @ the National Academy of Arts of Ukraine
- "Mykhailo Yakymovych Kozyk is Our Outstanding Compatriot", a detailed biography @ the Semenivka-Chernihiv website.
