= Mykola Murashko =

Ukrainian painter, art historian and teacher (1844–1909)

- Микола Мурашко
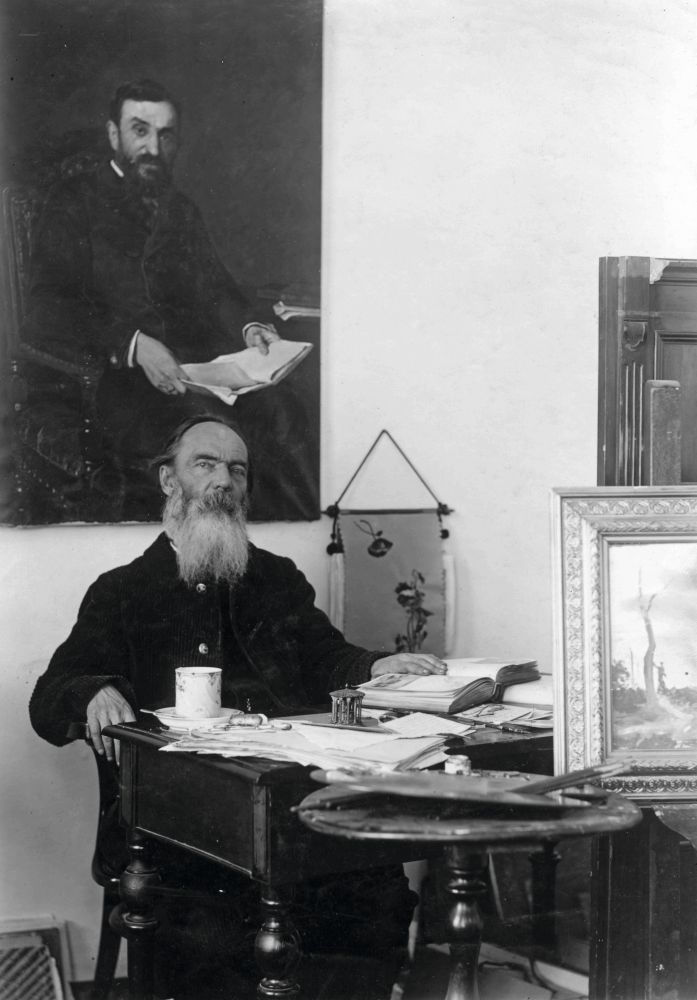
- Murashko in his study, 1890
- Born: 20 May [O.S. 8 May] 1844; Glukhov, Chernigov Governorate, Russian Empire
- Died: 22 September [O.S. 9 September] 1909 (aged 65); Bucha, Kiev Governorate, Russian Empire
- Education: Imperial Academy of Arts
- Movement: Peredvizhniki
- Relatives: Oleksandr Murashko (nephew)

Mykola Ivanovych Murashko (Note: Muraskho's name is cited as the Russian romanization Nikolai Ivanovich Murashko.) (Ukrainian: Микола Іванович Мурашко, romanized: Mykola Ivanovych Murashko; 20 May [O.S. 8 May] 1844 – 22 September [O.S. 9 September] 1909) was a Ukrainian painter, graphic designer, art historian and teacher. A representative of Peredvizhniki art movement, Murashko was the founder and the first director of the Kyiv Painting School. Murashko was one of the best friends of Ukrainian painter Ilya Repin.

== Biography ==
Murashko was born on 20 May [O.S. 8 May] 1844 in Glukhov, Chernigov Governorate (present-day Hlukhiv, Ukraine). His father was an icon carver of Ukrainian descent. From an early age he showed an interest in art; copying pictures from books. In 1858, the family moved to Kyiv. Five years later, Ivan Soshenko, a teacher at the gymnasium, recommended that he pursue training in art. That same year, he began auditing classes at the Imperial Academy of Arts in Saint Petersburg as a student of the painter Adrian Prakhov.

Illness prevented him from completing his course of study and he settled in Voronezh, but continued to send works to the Academy. On this basis, he was certified as an art teacher and began his career in a local primary school in 1868. In 1879, the Academy named him an "Artist, 3rd Degree".

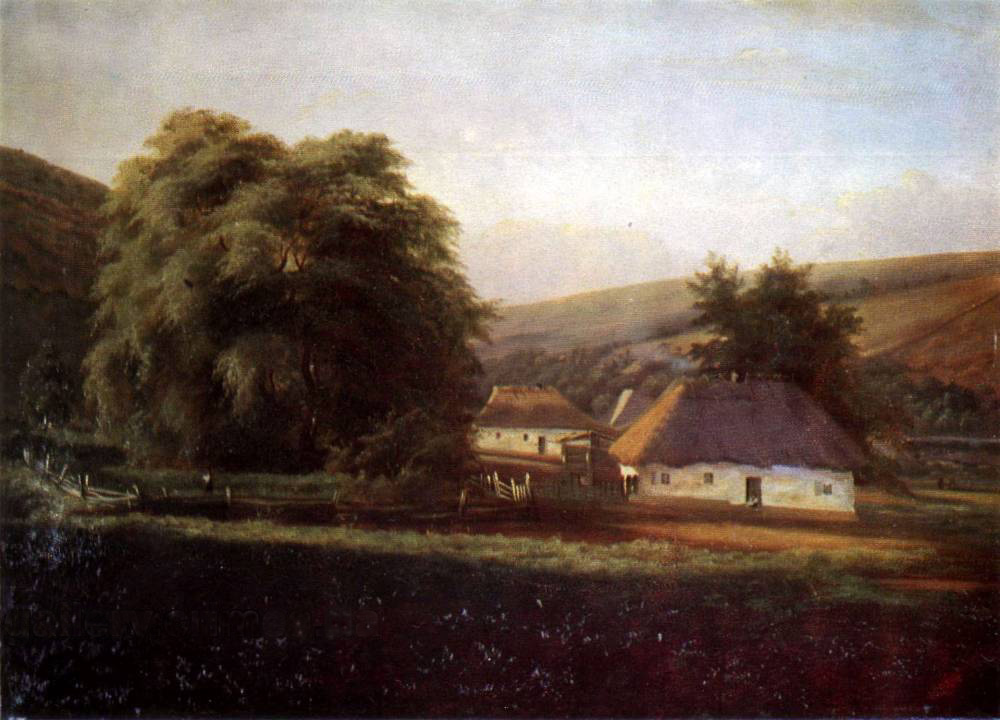
Mykola Murashko, Ukrainian Landscape (1896)

Over the years, he taught in several schools at different levels. From 1875 to 1901, he operated his own drawing school in Kyiv which was supported by many well known artists; notably Ilya Repin, a friend from the Academy. Among those who attended the school were Valentin Serov, Khariton Platonov, Ivan Seleznyov, Konstantin Kryzhitsky, Mykola Pymonenko and Sergey Kostenko. On his initiative, Kiev put on an annual art exhibition, beginning in 1877. Murashko's school was supported by philanthropist Ivan Tereshchenko.

Teaching, however, was always his priority and his students were given individual attention. In addition, he made numerous trips to Vienna, Paris, Rome and other notable art centers to study the latest teaching methods and wrote articles for a variety of local and national periodicals.

== Personal life ==
His nephew Oleksandr Murashko was an artist and one of the first members of the National Academy of Arts of Ukraine.

After the school closed, he retired to the village of Bucha, Kiev Governorate (present-day Kyiv Oblast) and began to write "Memoirs of an Old Master". Two parts were published, but the book was never finished, due to illness.

On 22 September [O.S. 9 September] 1909, Murashko died in Bucha aged 65. Murashko was buried in Kyiv.

== Works ==
In 1873 Murashko created the author's portrait and eleven illustrations for the first Ukrainian translation of Andersen's tales.

In the late 70s, the artist paints landscapes diligently. All these works were highly appreciated and some were bought for the museum of the Academy of Arts. During the same period, the artist painted several portraits, the best of which is considered to be the portrait of Nikolai Ge. The portrait is painted in the traditions of Russian realistic painting, with great psychological expressiveness displays the image of the artist.

Often the artist turned to the image of the Dnipro expanses. The most characteristic and successful is his landscape "Over the Dnieper", which impresses by its realism and non-duality.

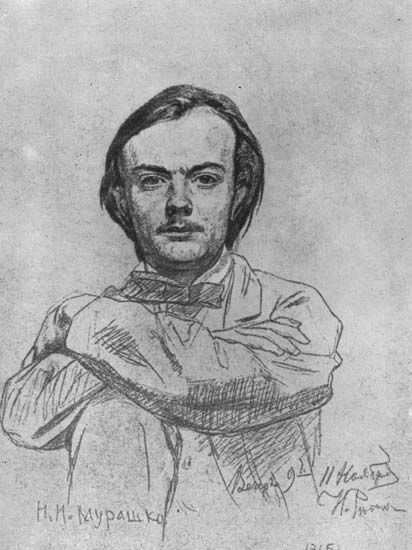
Mykola Murashko, portrait by Ilya Repin (1866)
