= Ivan Seleznyov =

Russian painter (1856–1936)

- Иван Селезнёв
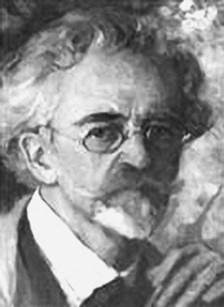
- Self-portrait
- Born: January 3, 1856; Kiev, Russian Empire
- Died: March 31, 1936 (aged 80); Kiev, Soviet Union
- Education: Imperial Academy of Arts (1881)
- Known for: Painting
- Awards: Big Gold Medal of the Imperial Academy of Arts (1882)

Ivan Fyodorovich Seleznyov (Russian: Иван Федорович Селезнёв; 3 January 1856 – 31 March 1936) was a Russian and Soviet painter and art teacher, known mostly for his historical paintings.

== Biography ==
He was born to a peasant family that originally came from Kaluga Governorate, Russian Empire. From 1872 to 1881, he studied at the Imperial Academy of Fine Arts with Pavel Chistyakov. While there, he was awarded two silver medals (1877, 1878) and one gold medal (1880), for his painting of Jacob recognizing Joseph's clothes.

Upon graduating, he received the title of "Artist" first degree for his painting of Saint Sergius blessing Dmitri Donskoy. The following year, his depiction of Prince Dmitriy Yurievich Krasny, the youngest son of Yury of Zvenigorod, won him a stipend to study in Rome. He was there from 1883 to 1886.

From 1886 to 1890, he taught at the Kiev Drawing School, operated by Nikolay Murashko. From 1898 to 1920, he gave classes at the Kiev Polytechnic Institute. After 1901, he also taught at the newly established Kiev Art College and served as Director there from 1911 to 1914. Among his more notable students were Boris Aronson, Mykhailo Kozyk, Boris Vladimirski and Karp Trokhymenko.

He was one of the founders of the "Kiev Fellowship of Religious Painting" and served as its Chairman after 1908. He also did restoration work on the frescoes at St. Cyril's Monastery.

== Works ==
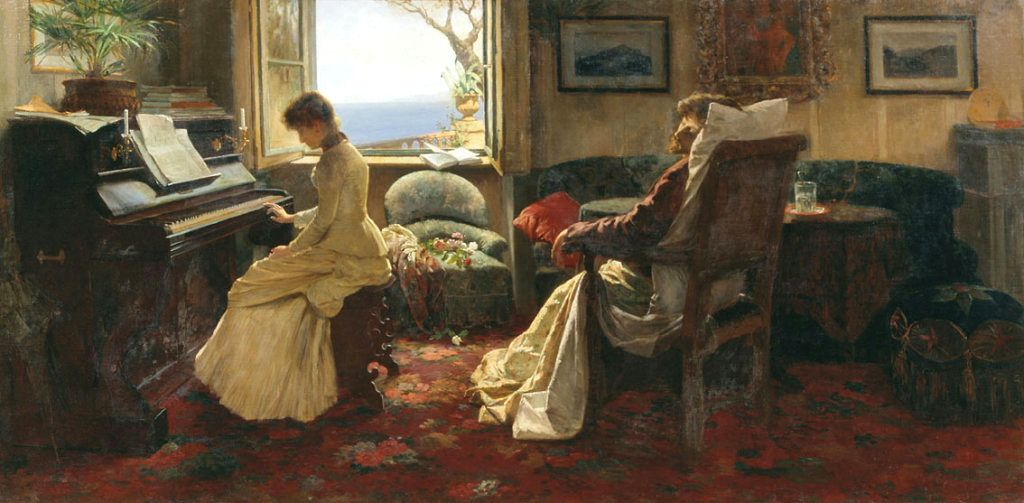
Last chord (1885)

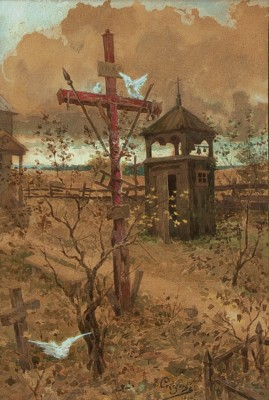
Chapel (1892)

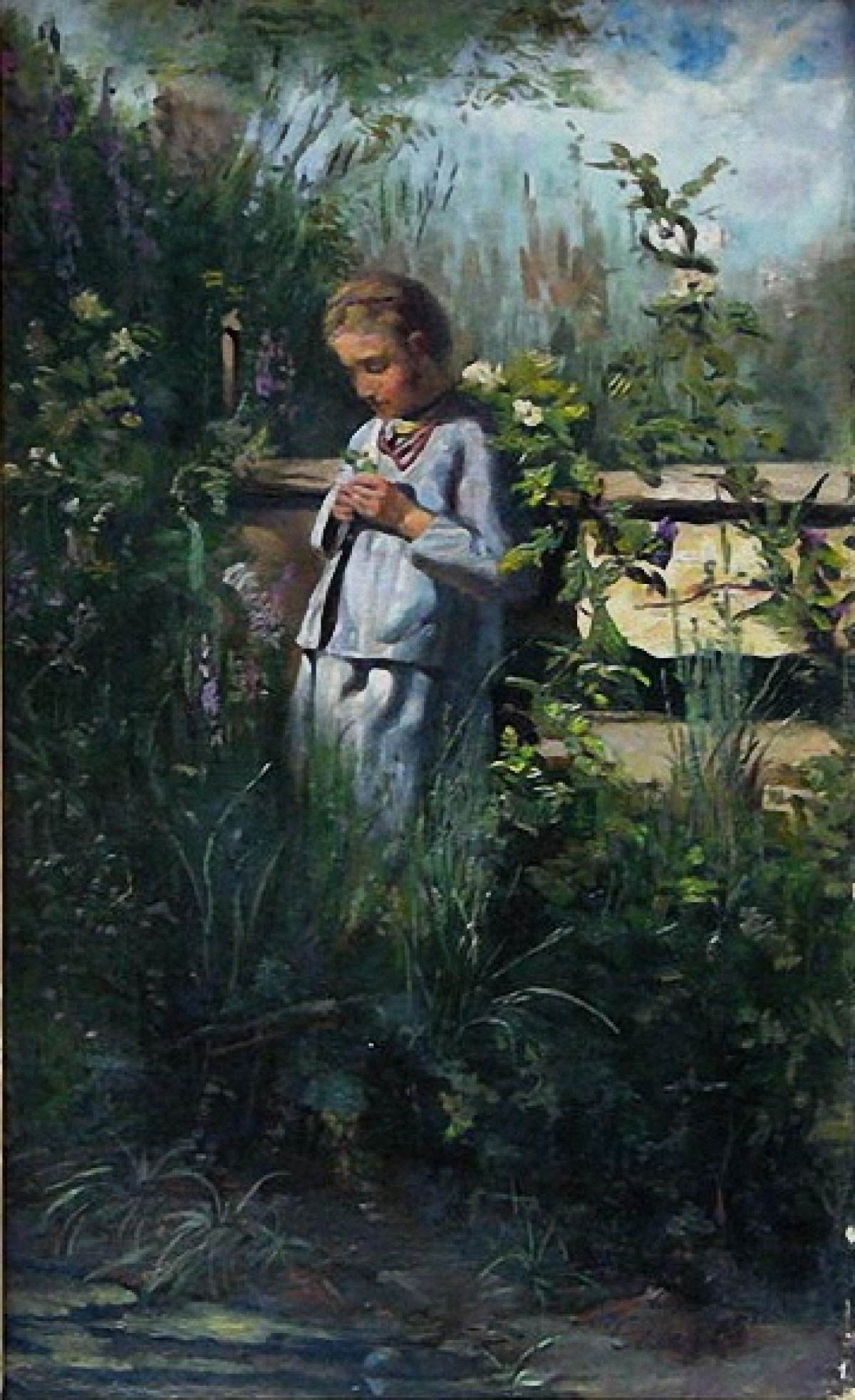
Girl
(date unknown)

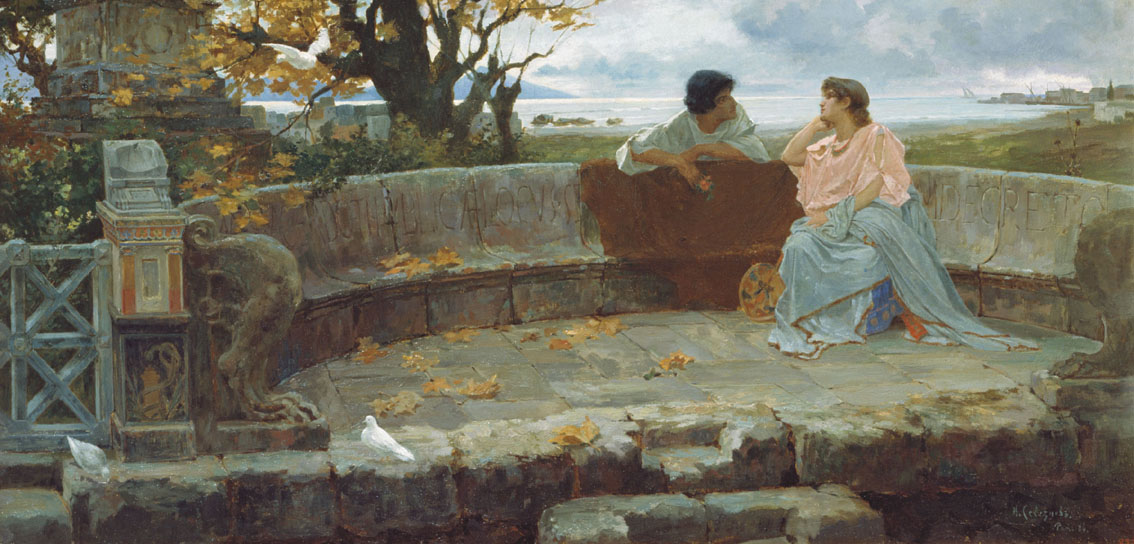
In Pompeii(1886)
