= Boris Vladimirski =

Soviet painter (1878–1950)

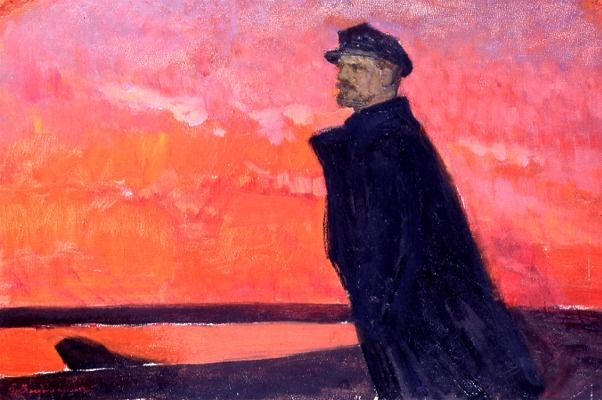
Vladimirski's Lenin in red dawn

Boris Eremeevich Vladimirski (February 27, 1878 – February 12, 1950) was a Soviet painter of the Socialist Realism school.

== Life and work ==
Vladimirski was born in Kiev, Ukraine. He began his artistic studies at age 10, later attending the newly established Kiev Art College (1900-1904) where he studied with Ivan Seleznyov, followed by the Academy of Arts and the Anton Ažbe School in Munich (1904-1908). He exhibited his first painting in 1906.

As an official Soviet artist his work was well received and widely exhibited. His works were aimed at exemplifying the work ethic of the Soviet people; they were displayed in many homes and federal buildings. He is also known for his paintings of prominent public officials.

His work "Roses for Stalin" is often considered a classic example of Socialist realism and Soviet propaganda. ”Black Ravens”, which depicts Soviet secret police (NKVD) that came at night to disappear people, is regarded as a piece that transcended the values of Socialist Realism. "It is still unknown how this work passed censorship."

== Literature ==
Matthew Cullerne Bown: Russian and Soviet Painters. Ilomar, London
