= A Victim of Fanaticism =

Painting by Mykola Pymonenko

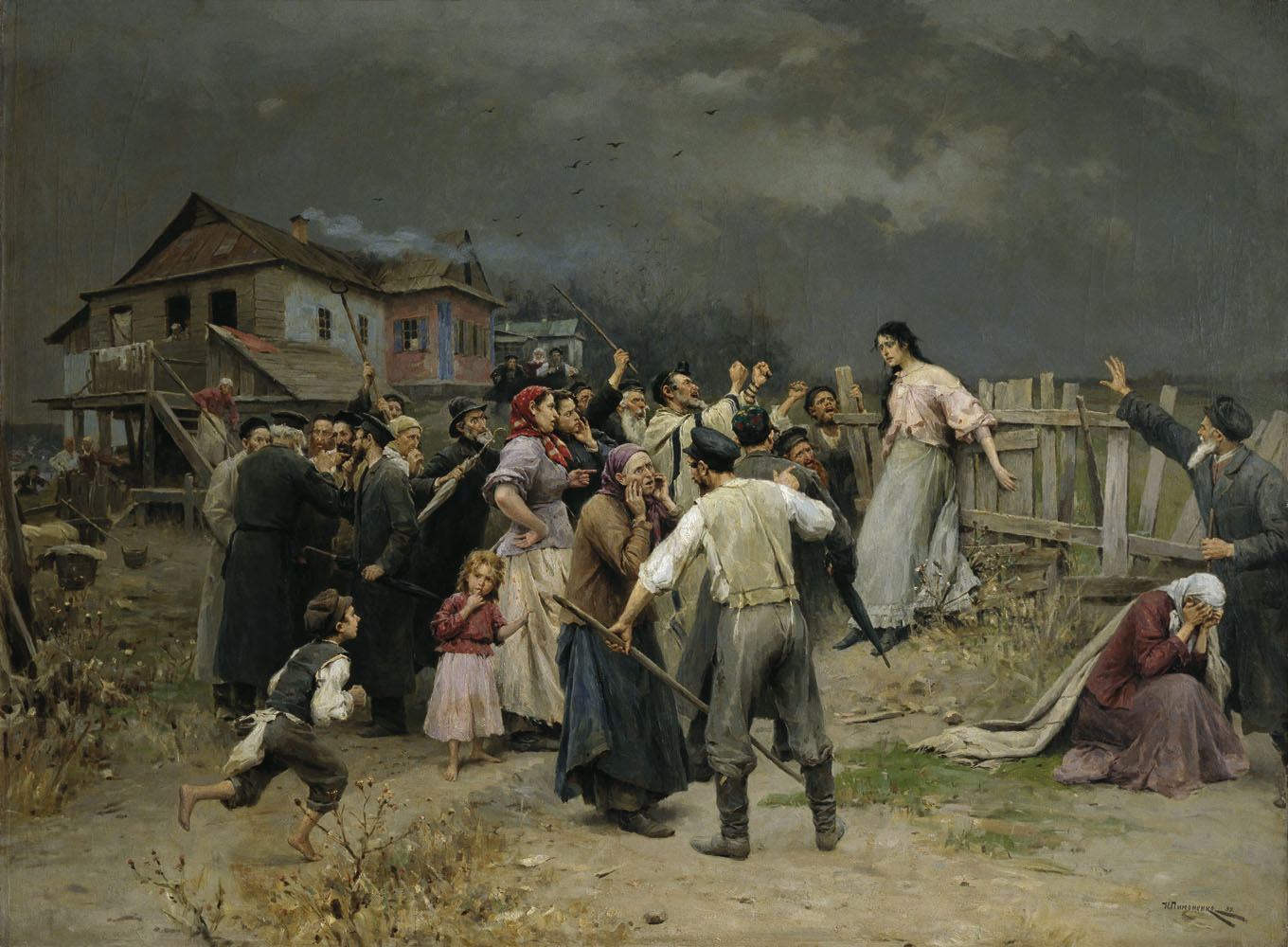
- Artist: Mykola Pymonenko
- Year: 1899
- Medium: Oil on canvas
- Dimensions: 180 × 224 cm
- Location: Kharkiv Art Museum

A Victim of Fanaticism (Ukrainian: Жертва фанатизму) is a painting by Mykola Pymonenko, painted in 1899.

== Background ==
Pymonenko had read a newspaper account of an attack by members of the Jewish community on a girl who fell in love with a Ukrainian blacksmith and decided to convert to Christianity to marry him. Pymonenko visited the town of Kremenets in Volhynia, where he made many sketches from nature.

== Subject ==
A young girl in a torn shirt, fleeing from an angry mob, clings to a fence, a cross is visible on her neck. Directly opposite her stands a man shaking his fists, wearing Jewish ritual clothes - in addition to the kippah, he wears a tefillin and a tallit. The rest of the inhabitants of the town are dressed casually. Many of them are armed with sticks, umbrellas and tongs. The girl's parents are somewhat aloof: the mother is crying, turning away from her daughter, and the father has his right hand raised as a sign of the renunciation of his daughter.

== Technical details ==
The painting is oil on canvas. It is currently on display at the Kharkiv Art Museum.
