= Konstantin Kryzhitsky =

Ukrainian painter

- Константин Крыжицкий
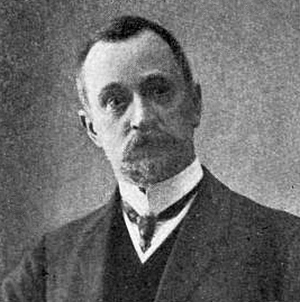
- Portrait, 1900s
- Born: 17 May 1858; Kiev, Russian Empire
- Died: 4 April 1911 (aged 52); Saint Petersburg, Russian Empire
- Resting place: Smolensky Cemetery, St. Petersburg
- Education: Full Member Academy of Arts (1900)
- Alma mater: Imperial Academy of Arts (1885)
- Known for: Painting
- Awards: Big Gold Medal of the Imperial Academy of Arts (1884)

Konstantin Yakovlevich Kryzhitsky (Russian: Константин Яковлевич Крыжицкий; Ukrainian: Костянтин Якович Крижицький; 17 May 1858 – 4 April 1911) was a Ukrainian landscape painter and drawing teacher of Ukrainian and Polish descent, who was the first chairman of the Arkhip Kuindzhi art society in St. Petersburg.

== Biography ==
He was born in a family with Ukrainian-Polish background. His father was a merchant. After finishing his primary education, he attended the drawing school operated by Mykola Murashko. In 1877, he entered the St. Petersburg Imperial Academy of Arts, where he studied with Mikhail Clodt. He completed his courses there in 1884, receiving the title of "Artist First-Class" and a gold medal for his painting "The Oaks". From 1884 to 1906, he taught drawing at the "Nikolaevsky Orphan Institute" in Gatchina.

In 1880, he became one of the first members of the Society of Russian Watercolorists. In 1889, his painting "Forest Vista" was purchased by Tsar Alexander III and he was named an "Academician". He visited France and Germany in the 1890s and exhibited at the Exposition Universelle (1900). That same year, he became a full member of the Academy. Later, he served as Chairman of an art society created by a bequest from his friend Arkhip Kuindzhi. He often returned to the area around Kiev to paint landscapes in oils and watercolors.

In 1910, he was accused of plagiarism by the tabloid press because one of his paintings was similar to a work by Yakov Brovar (1864–1941). Apparently, the resemblance derived from a photograph taken in the Białowieża Forest, that was later used as a model by both artists, and involved a single, distinctive tree. When this was pointed out, his critics declared that using a photograph for a painting was a form of "cheating". Due to the negative publicity and its effect on his reputation, he committed suicide. His maid found him in his office, where he had hung himself and left a suicide note.

== Selected paintings ==
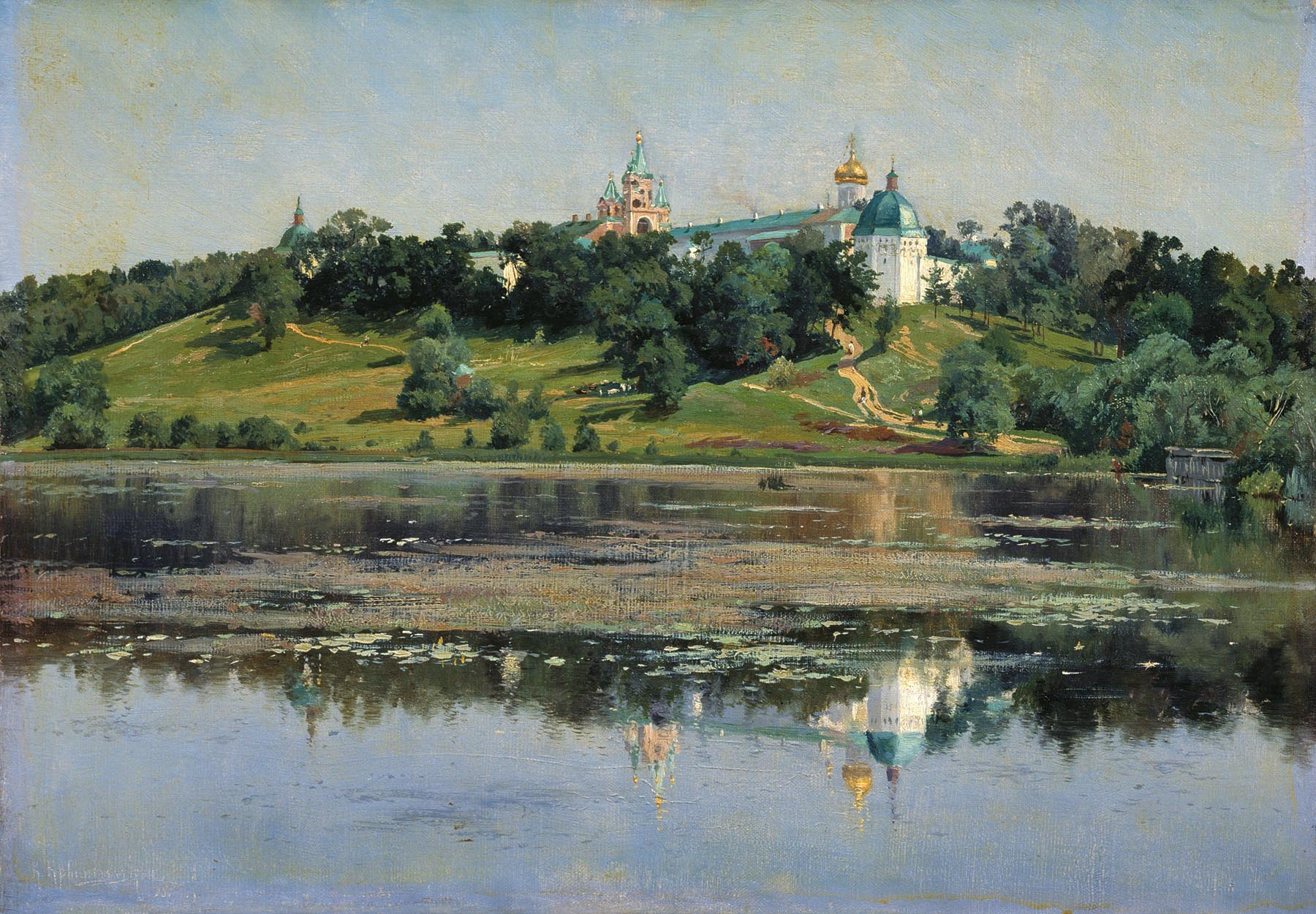
Zvenigorod

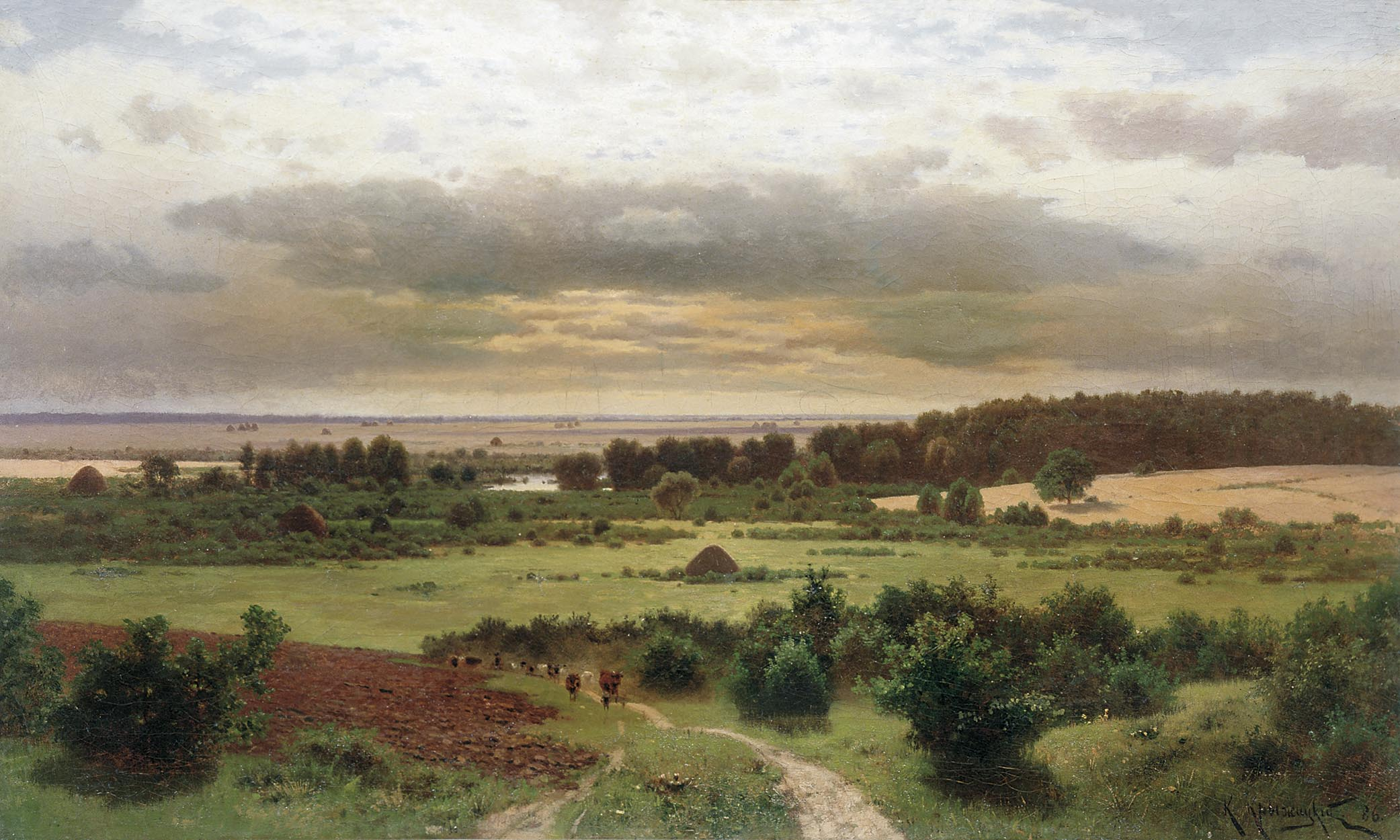
Forest Vista

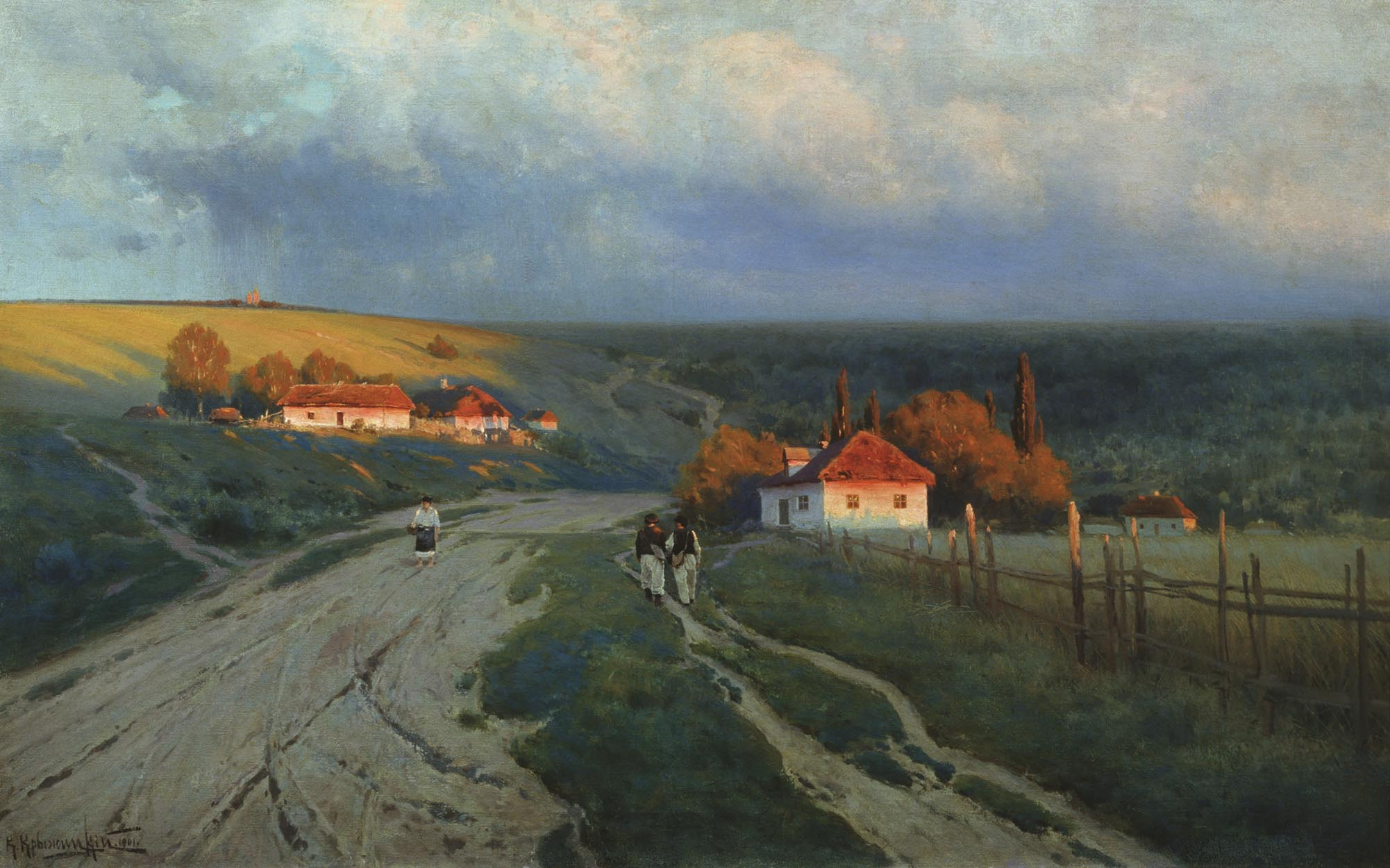
Evening in Ukraine
