= Vladimir Orlovsky =

Russian painter of Ukrainian origin

- Владимир Орловский
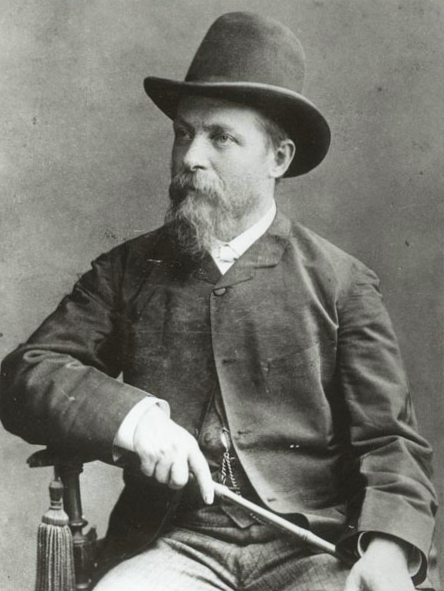
- Born: 20 January 1842; Kiev, Kiev Governorate, Russian Empire
- Died: 16 March 1914 (aged 72); Genoa, Kingdom of Italy
- Education: Imperial Academy of Arts (1867)
- Known for: Painting

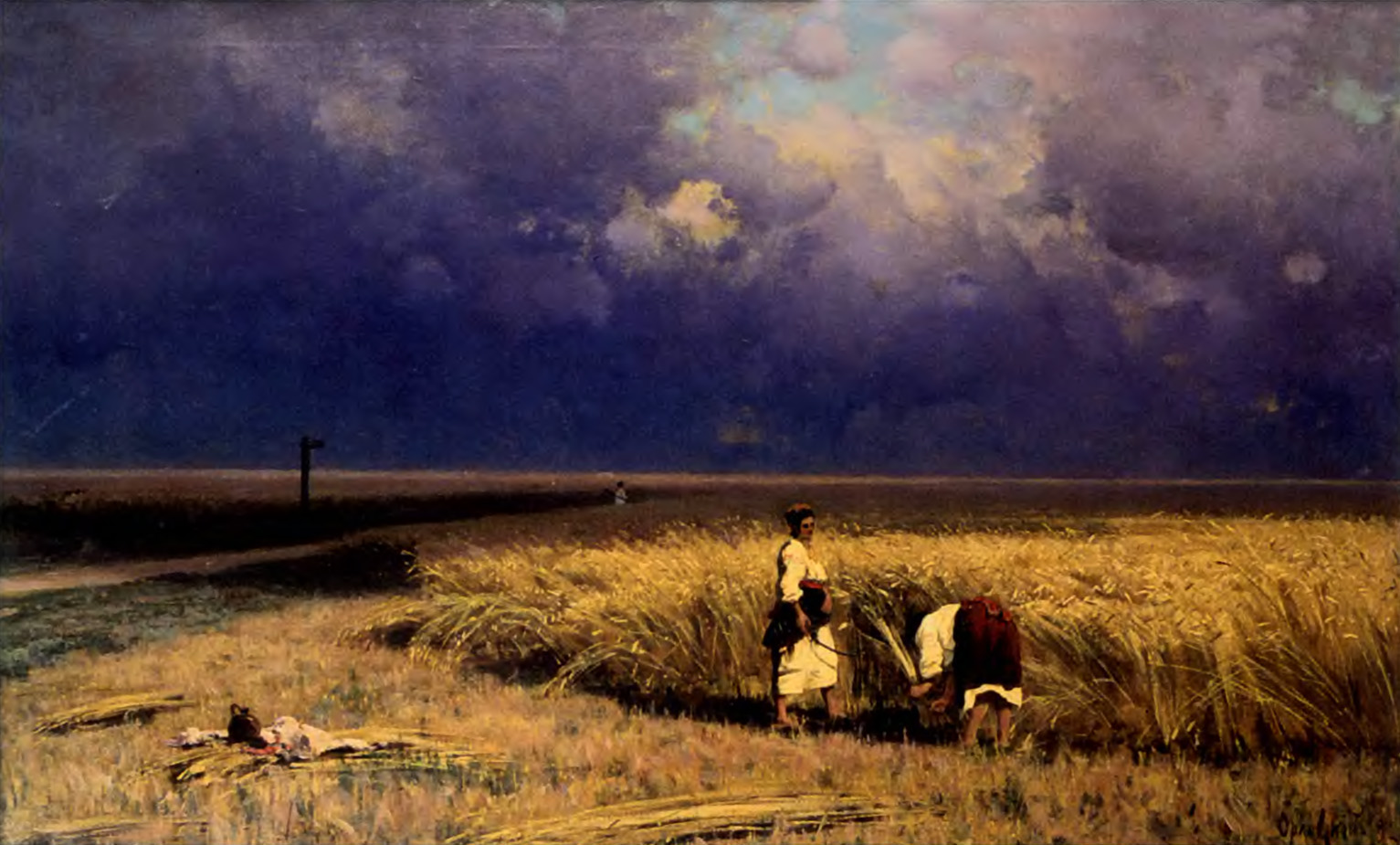
Harvest (1882) by Vladimir Orlovsky

Vladimir or Volodymyr Donatovich Orlovsky (Russian: Владимир Донатович Орловский Ukrainian: Володимир Донатович Орловський, romanized: Volodymyr Donatovych Orlovskyi; 1842 – 1914) was a Ukrainian realist painter of Ukrainian origin and an academic of the Saint Petersburg Academy of Arts. Orlovsky painted for Moscow and St. Petersburg aristocracies, and his art was even bought by the Emperor of Russia himself, Alexander III. Orlovsky is considered one of the founders of Ukrainian Realist landscape painting.

== Biography ==
Orlovsky was born in Kiev in 1842 to a landowning noble family of Ukrainian descent. His art teacher of the second Kiev gymnasium, Ivan Soshenko, who earlier helped Taras Shevchenko, believed in the talent of the young artist. The gymnasium's director M. Chalyi also recognized Orlovsky's talent and recommended him in a written letter to Shevchenko. And so it was that the painter's art education commenced with a letter of recommendation from Taras Shevchenko at the Saint Petersburg Academy of Fine Arts in 1861. During Orlovsky's study at the Imperial Academy of Arts, his teacher was one of the most famous Russian landscape painters of 19th century Alexey Bogolyubov. For his quick successes, Orlovsky received in St. Petersburg a large silver medal at the academy in 1863. Later he painted while in Moscow, St. Petersburg, Kiev, North Caucasus, Crimea and Finland.

Upon the conclusion of his studies in 1868, Orlovsky gained the recognition of his colleagues in the academic circles and the general public, earning the title of artist of the first degree. Orlovsky received a gold medal for his paintings of Crimean landscapes, which allowed him to travel abroad on government allowance. Thus, from 1869 to 1872, Orlovsky worked in Paris, France, as well as Switzerland, Germany, and Italy.

In two years, in 1874, Orlovsky was promoted to the status of an academic, and in 1878 for his painting Harvest he was made professor. He enjoyed popularity on par with Ivan Aivazovsky, and was influenced by the work of Arkhip Kuindzhi.

In 1897, the artist became ill with typhoid, and following the advice of his doctors moved from St. Petersburg with its dampness to Kiev. To keep his health, Vladimir Orlovsky spent the rest of his life in Genoa, Italy.
