= Mykola Pymonenko =

Ukrainian painter (1862–1912)

- Микола Пимоненко
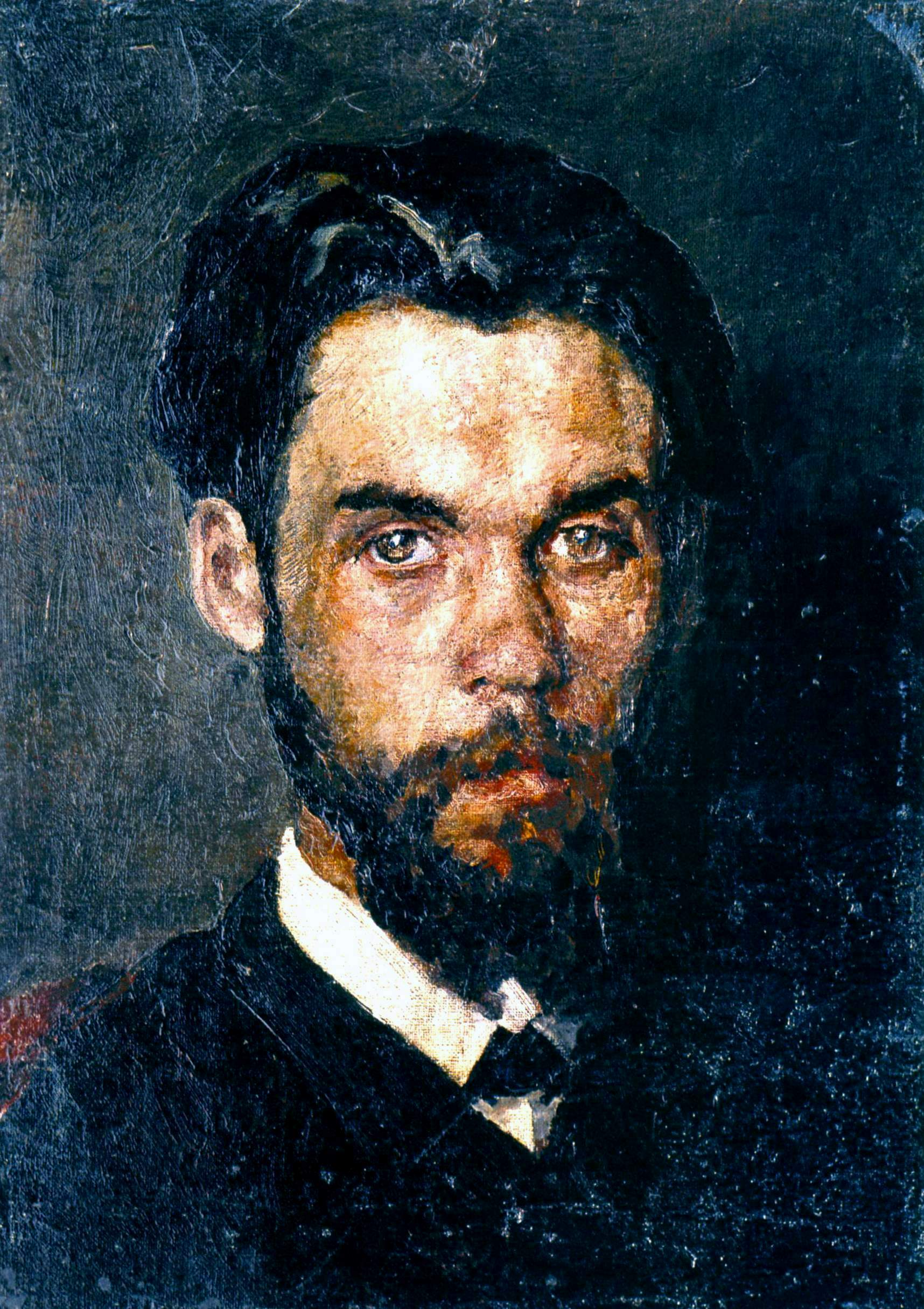
- Self portrait (1886), National Art Museum of Ukraine
- Born: 9 March 1862; Priorka, Kiev Governorate, Russian Empire (now Ukraine)
- Died: 26 March 1912 (aged 50); Kyiv, Russian Empire (now Ukraine)
- Education: Member Academy of Arts
- Alma mater: Imperial Academy of Arts (1882)
- Known for: Painting
- Style: Realism

Mykola Kornylovych Pymonenko (Ukrainian: Микола Корнилович Пимоненко; 9 March 1862 – 8 April [O.S. 26 March] (Note: Russia was still using old style dates in the 19th century, rendering his lifespan as 21 March 1862 – 25 October 1893.) 1912) was a Ukrainian realist painter who lived and worked in Kyiv. One of his students was Kazimir Malevich, whose early works were influenced by Pymonenko.

He is best known for his urban and rural genre scenes of farmers, country folk and working-class people.

== Biography ==
Mykola Kornylovych Pymonenko was born 9 March 1862 in the village of Priorka on the outskirts of Kyiv. His father was a master iconographer, of Ukrainian descent. After working as his father's assistant, Pymonenko went on to study icon painting at the Kyiv Pechersk Lavra.

In 1876, Pymonenko's work was seen by Mykola Murashko, one of the founders of the Kyiv Art School, who was impressed by the young artist, and lobbied the school's financial backers to allow him to study there for free. Two years later, Pymonenko enrolled at the school, where he worked with the painters Khariton Platonov, Murashko, and others. He studied there until 1882. After his examination work was sent to the Imperial Academy of Fine Arts in Saint Petersburg in 1881, he received a licence to teach drawing at lower secondary school level, and was able to audit classes at the Academy. He married the daughter of Vladimir Orlovsky, one of his instructors.

From 1882 to 1884 Pymonenko studied at the St Petersburg Academy of Arts. That year, both his poor health (possibly caused by tuberculosis) and a lack of funds caused him to return to Kyiv, where he found work as a drawing teacher at a private school. After the school closed in 1901, he moved to the Kyiv Polytechnic Institute of Emperor Alexander II. From 1906 he taught at the Kyiv Art School, Kazimir Malevich being one of his most notable students.

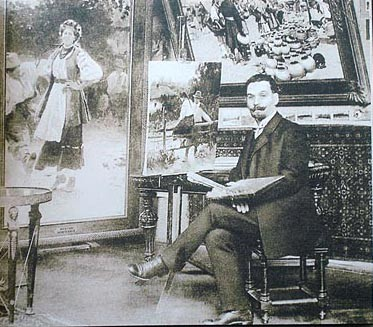
Pymonenko in his studio

In 1897, Pymonenko was involved in decorating Kyiv's St Volodymyr's Cathedral and was awarded the Order of Saint Anne for his work there. From 1893 he was a member of the Peredvizhniki, and in 1899 he became a full member of the group, and was named an 'academician' in 1904. He won a gold medal at the Salon in 1909 for his exhibited painting Hopak, now in the Louvre. In addition to the Louvre, Pymonenko's work was also of interest in Germany. In 1904, one of the Munich museums acquired the painting "Maundy Thursday". The National Art Museum has an author's copy of the smaller painting from the late 1900s.

Pymonenko died in 1912 after a short illness. He was buried at the Lukyanivka Cemetery. His 1913 posthumous exhibition at the Academy of Arts featured 184 paintings, 419 sketches and 112 pencil drawings. A street was named after him in 1959, and, in 1997 a museum devoted to him was opened in Malyutyanka, a village he visited regularly each year. Several of his works have alternate versions, painted years apart.

== Reputation ==
Pymonenko fell out of favour with the Peredvizhniki when one of his paintings, Going Home, was used (apparently without his permission) by the Shustov Vodka Company to promote their spotykach (a type of horilka). He was accused of having become "corrupted" and was forced to sue the company to have the image removed.

In 1905, Pymonenko complained to his friend Lazarevsky: "They (Ukrainians) say that I am a renegade, that I do not love my homeland, that I do not give what is needed that my plots are pale, but that all this is not true, not true." Mykola Golubed waved: “It is clear from those words that Pymonenko was wronged as a citizen, but he was praised as an artist by the critics. Pymonenko was a true link between the painting of Shevchenko and Trutovsky."

== Gallery ==
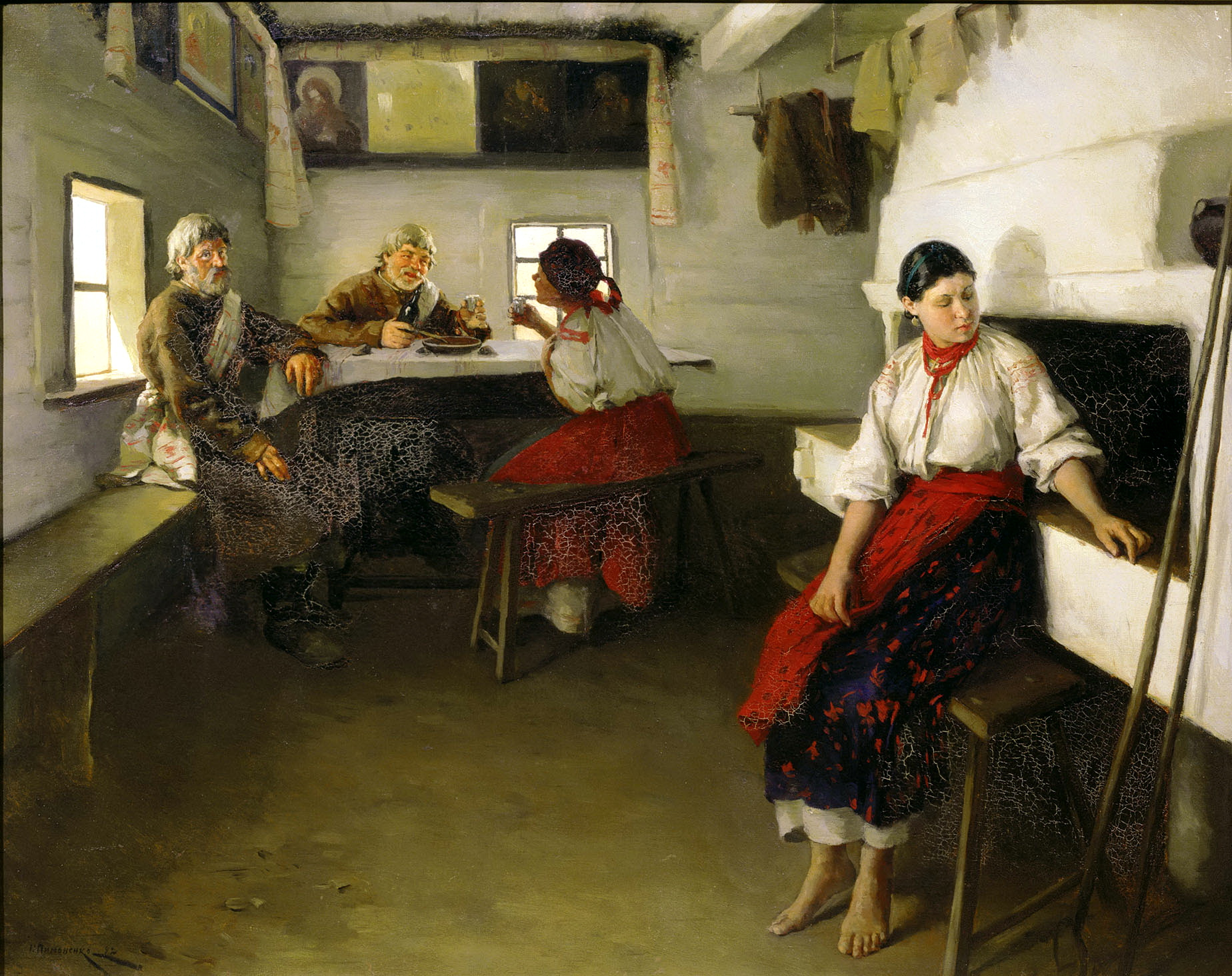
Matchmakers (1882), Kovalenko Krasnodar Regional Art Museum

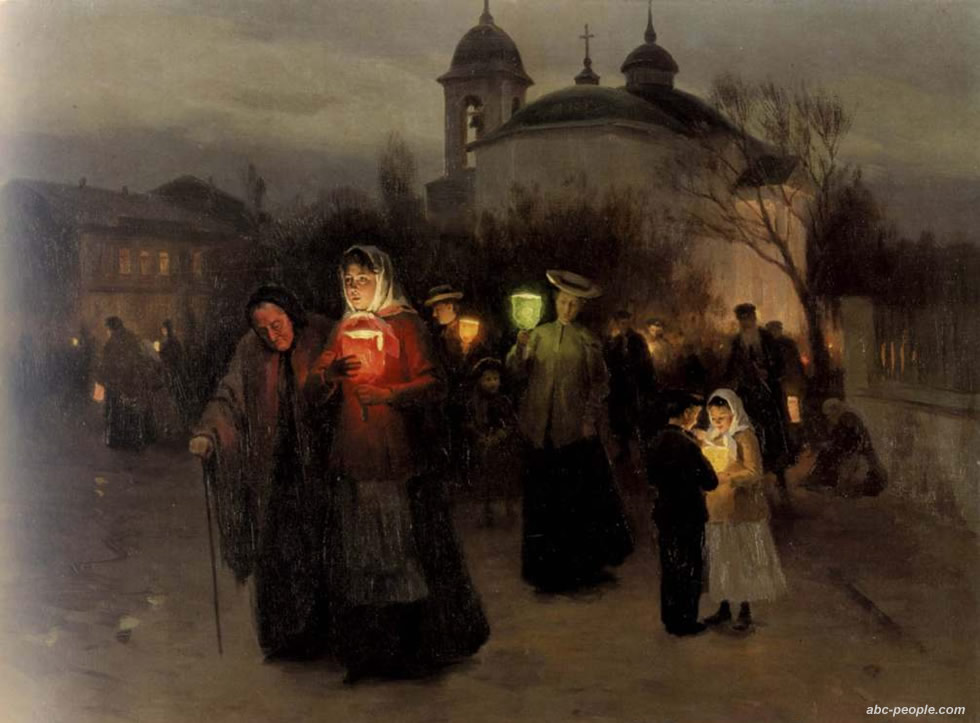
Maundy Thursday (1887), National Art Museum of Ukraine

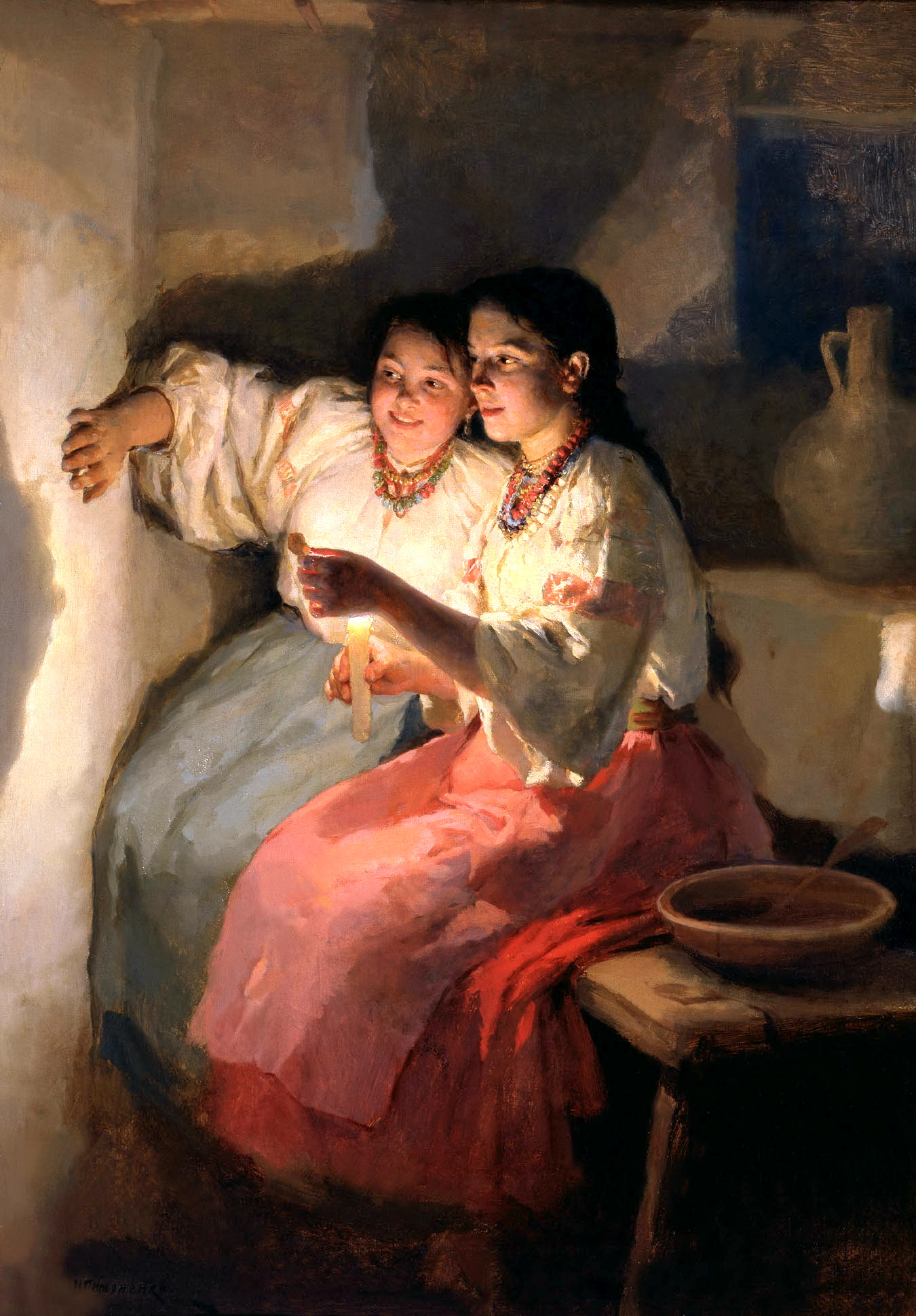
Yuletide Fortune Tellers (1888), Russian Museum

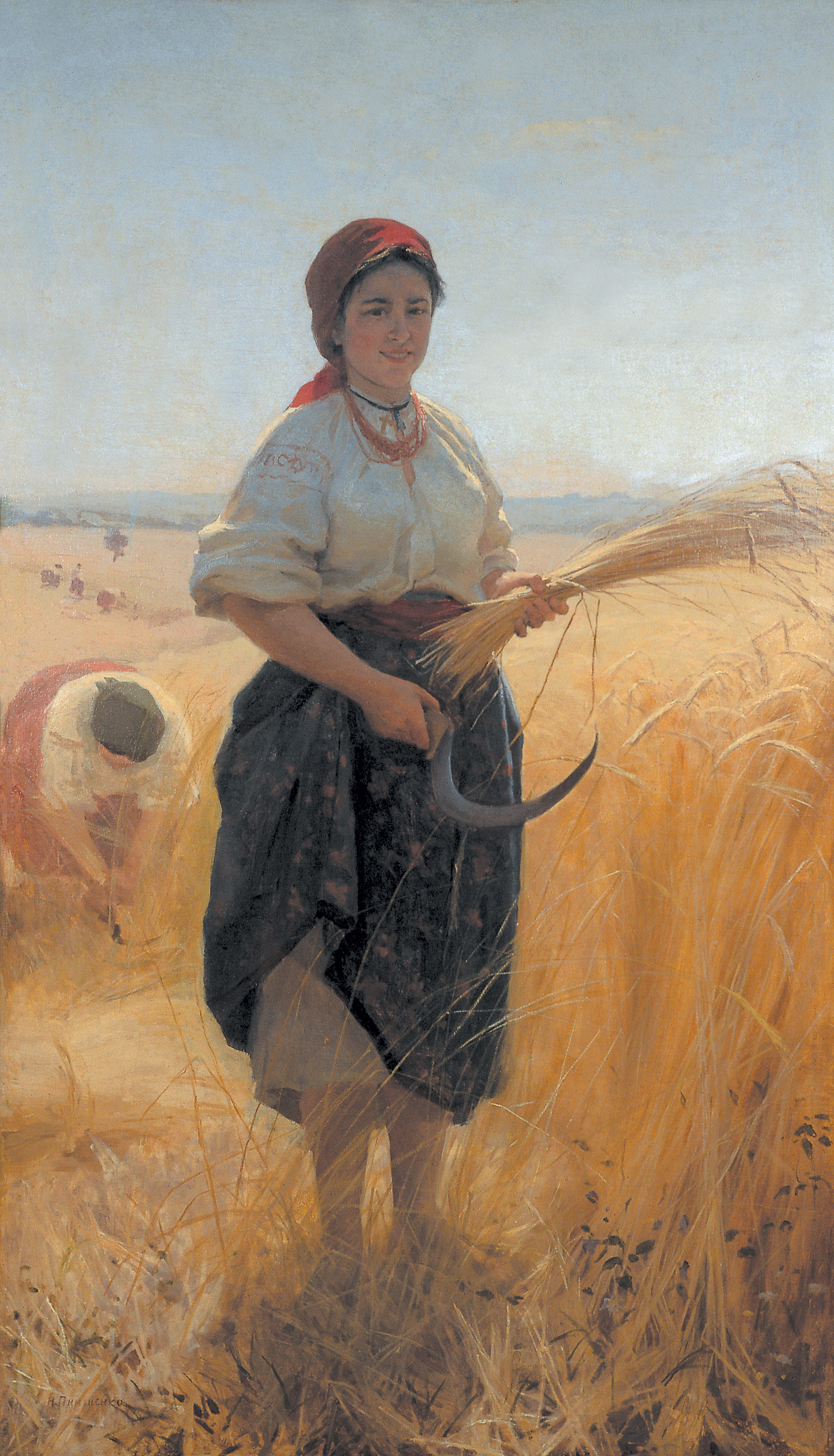
The Reaper (1889), National Art Museum of Ukraine

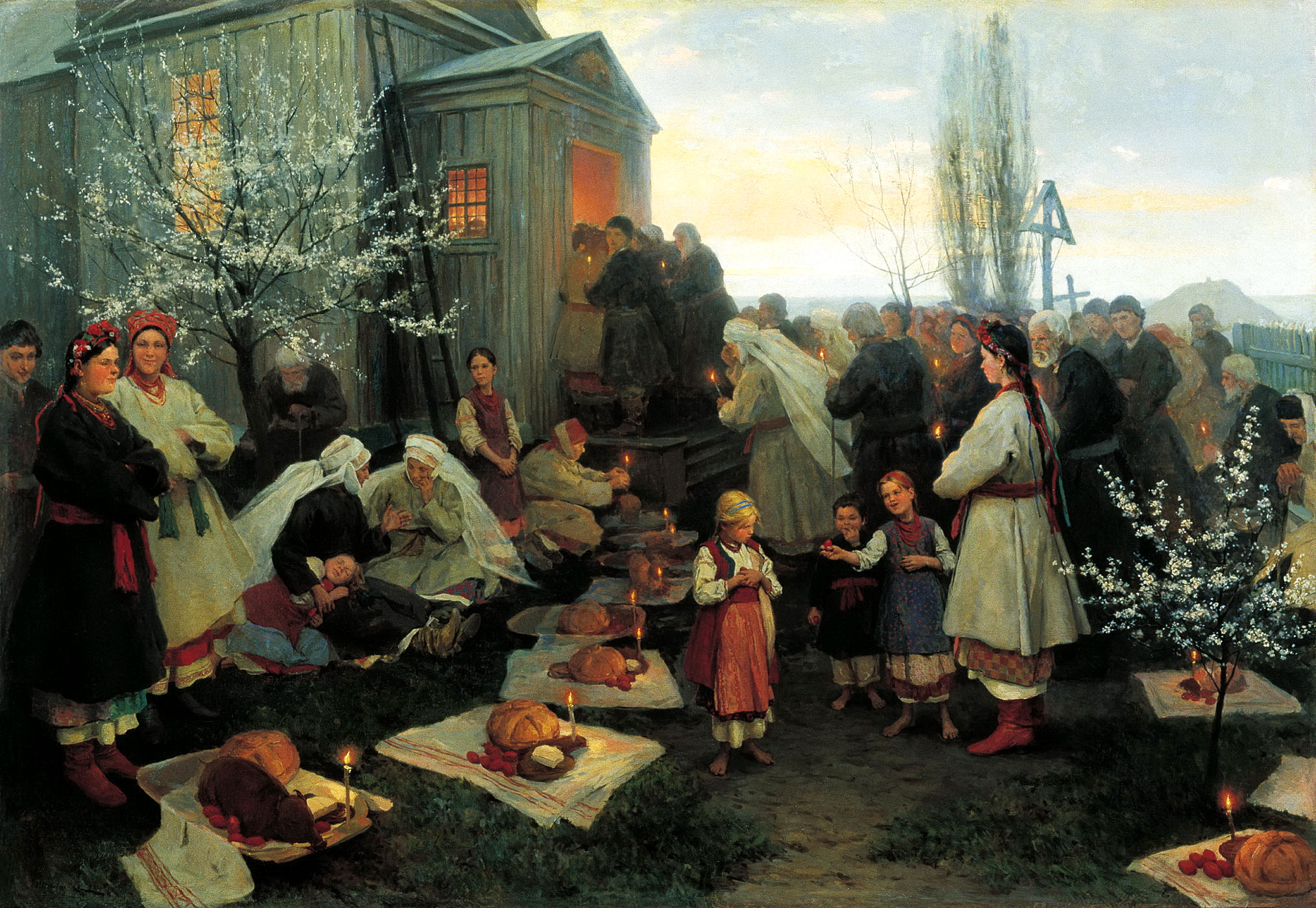
Easter Matins (1891), Rybinsk Museum-Preserve

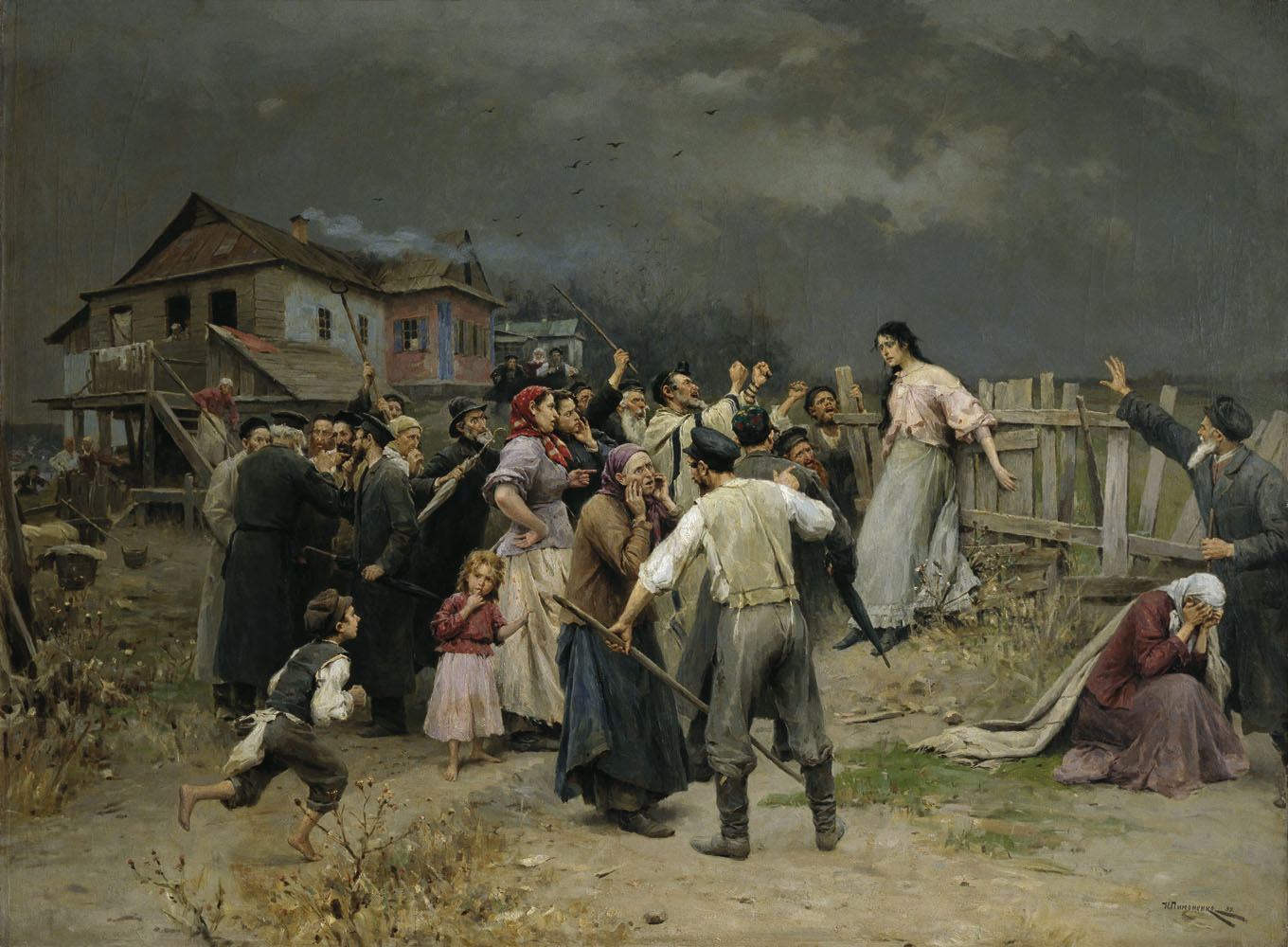
A victim of fanaticism (c. 1899), Fine Arts Museum Kharkiv

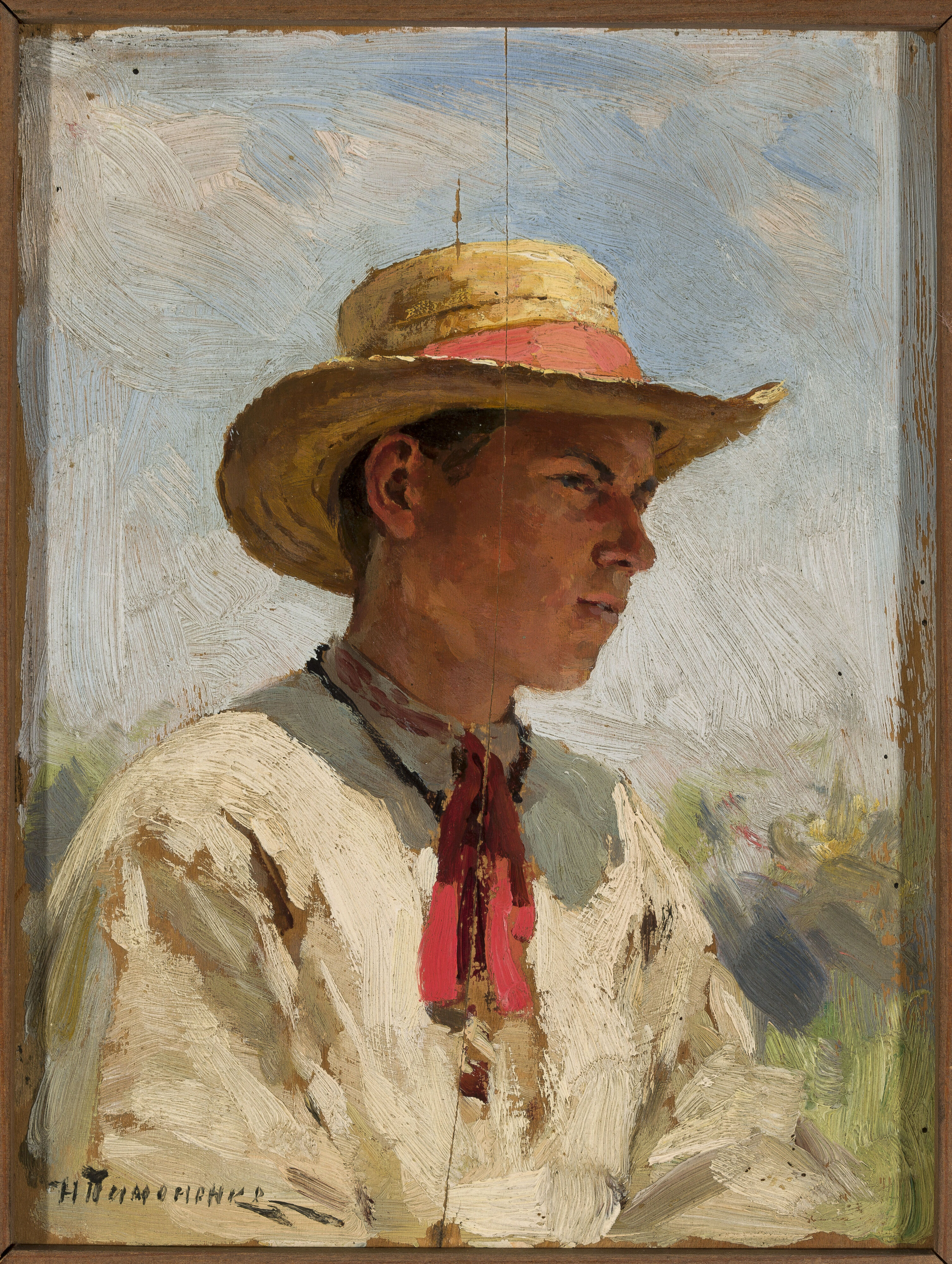
Study of a young boy in a straw hat (1905–1906), National Museum in Warsaw

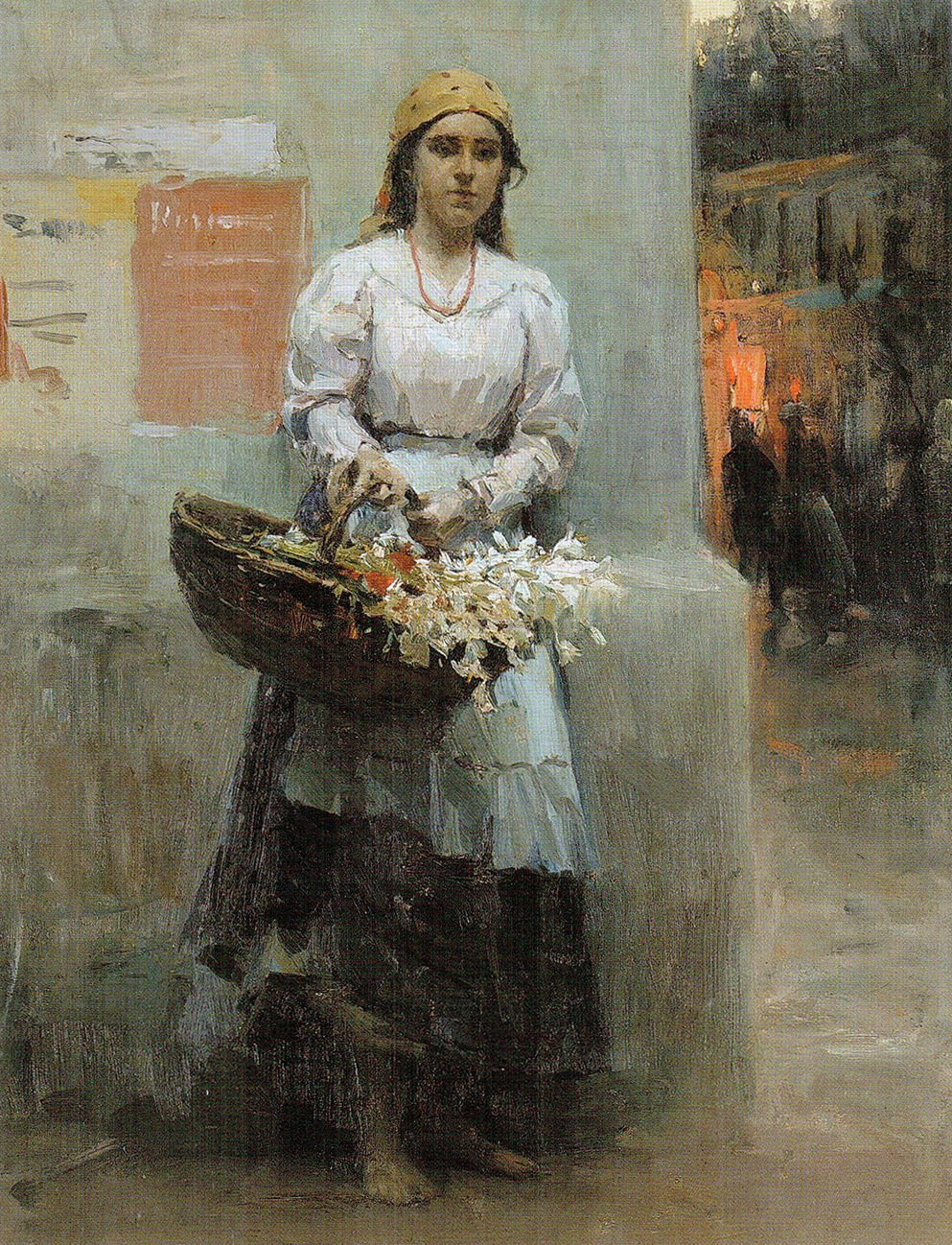
Flower Girl (1908), National Art Museum of Ukraine

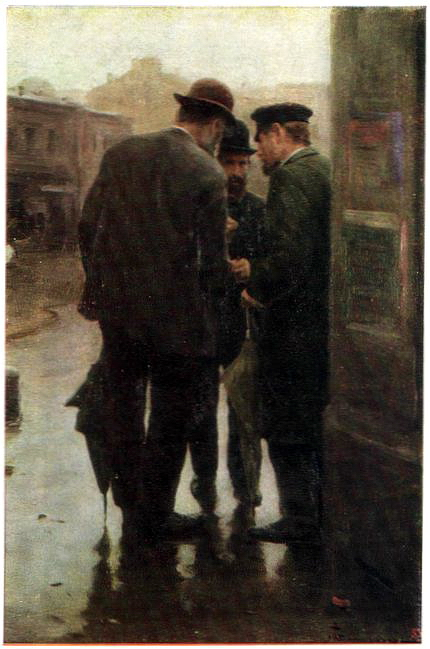
A Conversation (before 1912), The Kostroma State Historical, Architectural & Arts Museum Reserve

== Sources ==
- Konovalov, Ėduard (2008). Новый полный биографический словарь русских художников [The New Complete Biographical Dictionary of Russian Artists]. Moscow: ĖKSMO. ISBN 978-5-699-20636-0.
- Onatsky, E. (1963). "Микола Пимоненко" [Mykola Pymonenko] (PDF). Ukrainian Small Encyclopedia (in Ukrainian). Vol. 6. Buenos Aires: UAOC.
- Popova, L. I. (2003). "Pimonenko, Mykola (Kornylevych) [Nikolay Kornil'yevich]". Grove Art Online. doi:10.1093/gao/9781884446054.article.T067694.

=== Further reading ===
- Hook, Philip; Poltimore, Mark (1987). Popular 19th Century Painting: a dictionary of European genre painters. Woodbridge Antique Collector's Club. ISBN 978-18514-9-011-0.
- Ogievska, I.V. (2013). Микола Пимоненко: альбом (in Ukrainian and English). Kyiv: Mystetstvo. ISBN 978-966-577-109-8.
- Volodymyr Orlovskyi (text), Микола Пимоненко (Mykola Pymonenko), images compiled by Olga Zhbankova, edited by Alexander Klimchuk. National Art Museum of Ukraine, and Khmelnitsky: Galereya, 2004 ISBN 966-8834-05-4, in Ukrainian.
- Boris Chyp, O.G. Oganesyan, Микола Пимоненко: біографічний роман (Mykola Pymonenko: biographical novel), Vol.59 of "Celebrated Names", Kyiv: Molod' (Youth Publishing), 1983, in Ukrainian.
- Zatenatsky, Y.P. (1955). Николай Корнилович Пимоненко: жизнь и творчество, 1862-1912 [Nikolay Kornilovich Pimonenko: Life and Work, 1862-1912] (in Russian). Kiev: Ukrainian SSR Science Academy; Institute of Arts, Folklore and Ethnography. OCLC 652334680.
