= Eleonore Koch =

Brazilian painter and sculptor

- Born: 2 April 1926; Berlin, Germany
- Died: 1 August 2018 (aged 92); São Paulo, Brazil
- Known for: Painting

Eleonore Koch, also known as Lore Koch (April 2, 1926 – August 1, 2018), was a German-born Brazilian painter and sculptor. She was best known for paintings that evoke the memory of everyday objects, while also exploring the sensory nature of painting through a tension between color planes and line.

== Background ==
Koch was born in Berlin, Germany, in 1926, the daughter of the Jewish psychoanalyst Adelheid Koch and attorney Ernst Koch; she had one sibling, an older sister, Esther. Fleeing persecution under the Nazi regime, her family emigrated to São Paulo, Brazil, in 1936.

At the age of 17 Koch began study at the Museu Nacional de Belas Artes, but was dissatisfied with her experience there, and left after a brief time. On the suggestion of her parents, she went on to learn bookbinding, and worked at several bookshops in the immigrant milieu. Interested in both painting and sculpture, she subsequently studied privately with the artists Yolanda Mohalyi, Elisabeth Nobiling, Samson Flexor, and, beginning in 1947, Bruno Giorgi. Beginning in 1949, she resided in Paris, and continued her studies under painter Árpád Szenes and sculptor Robert Coutin.

== Career ==
Upon returning to São Paulo, in 1952, Koch worked as a set designer for the fledgling television station Tupi, and also found work at the University of São Paulo, as an assistant to the scientists Mário Schenberg and César Lattes. Through her acquaintance with the psychoanalyst, art collector and critic Theon Spanudis, she met the prominent modernist painter Alfredo Volpi, and from 1953 to 1956 pursued her art studies under him, shifting her focus during this period from sculpture to painting. Volpi greatly influenced her work, and she eventually came to be regarded as his only disciple.

After her submissions to the São Paulo International Biennial (Bienal Internacional de São Paulo) had been repeatedly rejected in the course of the 1950s. from 1959 to 1967 she had work accepted into four successive biennials.

In 1966 her career took a significant turn when, during a temporary stay in London, her work was accepted for an exhibition at the Mercury Gallery, and also drew the attention of the wealthy collector Alistair McAlpine, who became her sponsor for some years. As a result, Koch moved to London in 1968, and lived there for the following two decades. During this period she continued to develop and exhibit her art. Around 1976 she took a position as a Portuguese translator for Scotland Yard, and continued to work for the police for the next 13 years, enjoying the job for the many different stories it exposed her to.

In 1989, at the age of 63, Koch finally returned to Brazil, a life change that led to her reconnecting to landscapes and colors in her art.

Although until later years she remained little known to the general public, she achieved some recognition in artists' circles. She came to wider attention in 2013, when the publisher Cosac Naify brought out a book devoted to her work, Lore Koch, with text by art critic Paulo Venancio Filho.

== Death ==
Koch died on August 1, 2018, in São Paulo.
