= Grekov Odesa Art School =

Art school in Odesa, Ukraine

Coordinates: 46°29′16″N 30°44′0″E

- Одеське художнє училище імені Митрофана Грекова
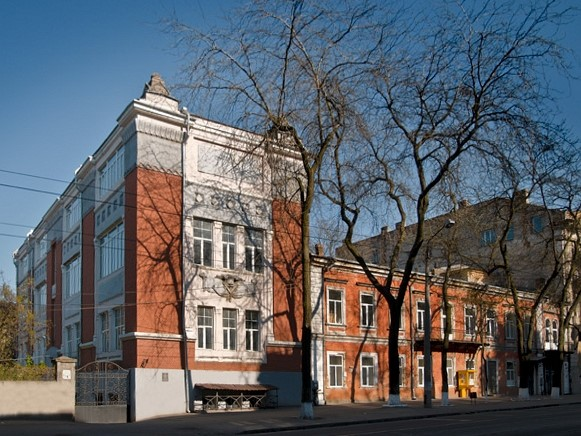
- Other names: Grekovka; ОХУ
- Former names: Odesa Art School of Drawing; Odesa Art School
- Type: Art School
- Established: May 29, 1865
- Founders: Odesa Fine Arts Society
- Accreditation: Ministry of Culture of Ukraine
- Location: Ukraine, Odesa St. Preobrazhenskaya, 14, 14/16, Odessa, Ukraine
- Website: https://grekovka.com.ua/

The Grekov Odesa Art School (1865–present) [Ukrainian: Одеське художнє училище імені Митрофана Грекова; abbreviated ОХУ] is an accredited full-time four-year art school in Odesa, Ukraine, offering both a bachelor of arts and a bachelor of fine arts. The school's educational approach focuses on small-group learning in one of four disciplines: Painting (живопис), Sculpture (скульптура), Decorative Art (ceramics, batik) (художнє декорування середовища), and Design (artwork) (дизайн).

Founded by the patrons of the Odesa Fine Arts Society, which included Governor-General P. Kotzebue, Mayor M. Novoselsky, Princes Gagarins (a prominent Russian noble of Rurikid descent), a Count Tolstoy (likely related to the author), the Italian Consul General of Castile, and several renowned architects, including Francesco Boffo, the art school is the oldest in Ukraine. It is most notable, however, for training several generations of artists like David Burliuk, Franz Roubaud, Leonid Pasternak, and Amshei Nurenberg in the "Ukrainian avant-garde, an artistic and cultural movement emerging from the 1900s to the 1930s, a unique combination of Ukrainian folk art and European modernist trends, including Cubism, Futurism, Constructivism, and Symbolism."

== History and Reputation ==
In the early 1900s, the school blossomed under the leadership of painter and art scholar Kyriak Kostandi. A dedicated Russian realist, and follower of the Peredvizhniki (lit. Itinerants) movement, he ultimately integrated impressionist techniques into his work to fully realize the emotional impact he sought. He encouraged his students to learn foundational techniques at the school, and then study the avant-garde in Paris, the birthplace of Impressionism (c.1860s–1880s), Fauvism (c. 1905), and Cubism (c. 1907-08); and in Munich, the eponymous birthplace of the Munich Secession (c. 1895–1910), Jugendstil (c. 1890–1910) and Bauhaus (c. 1920).

In Munich, artists Wassily Kandinsky and David Burliuk helped sculptor and alumnus Vladimir Izdebsky organized the 1909 and 1910 "Izdebsky Salons"—the first and hugely influential exhibitions of modern Western Art in the Russian Empire. When students returned from abroad, Kostandi also took care to help showcase what they had learned. At the same time, the school was also unique for admitting Jewish students without restriction in an era when that was rare. "Few were able to continue their education at the very conservative Imperial Academy of Arts in Saint Petersburg; the Moscow School of Painting, Sculpture and Architecture would not admit Jews at all," Gregory Vernitsky writes in "Kandinsky's Odesa, Ukraine Context: The Fate of Modern Art in the Russian Empire." By 1904, 60 percent of the student body was Jewish, and a few went on to teach there, furthering the tradition of building on classical technique in modernist ways. Collectively, the school's students came to be called "Odesa Parisians."

== Building and Identity ==
For twenty years, the school survived on donations and had no permanent address. As a result, architect Franz Morandi, the vice president of the locally influential Odesa Fine Arts Society, which also helped found the Odesa Museum of Fine Arts, became involved in its funding. The first plaster casts, prints, models were discharged to him from the Academy of Fine Arts of Milan, with which he had good relations. Meanwhile, all of the earliest teachers worked for free, including Luigi Iorini, a graduate of the academy in Milan, who moved to Odesa at Morandi's urging, and taught drawing and sculpture until his death in 1911.

On May 22, 1883, the cornerstone of the art school was laid on Preobrazhenska Street. Then, in 1885, the school moved to its current address. The school's charter as an art school was approved on December 30, 1899, and the Grand Duke Vladimir Alexandrovich sponsored it for the next 25 years. In 1924, the school was renamed the Polytechnic College of Fine Arts, and its mandate was to train muralists, printers, and potters. Then, in 1930, the school was redesignated an art institute for the purposes of higher education. Only four years later, however, the Odesa Art Institute was once again redesignated a school for secondary education.

In 1965, in honor of the school's 100th anniversary, the school was renamed for painter Mitrofan Grekov, renowned as the "father of military battle painting," who got his start at the school, and later attended the St. Petersburg Academy of Arts under the mentorship of painters Ilya Repin and Franz Roubaud. In 2007, the Grekov Odesa Art School was restored to its status as a full-fledged art school. In 2008, the Ministry of Science and Education of Ukraine approved its full-time 4-year course of academic and professional study.

On July 3, 2025, the Odesa Fine Arts Museum hosted the school's 160th anniversary with the exhibition "Pleides," in honor of the school's key milestones and most celebrated alumni.

== Alumni Art and Design ==
(Selection was limited by availability.)

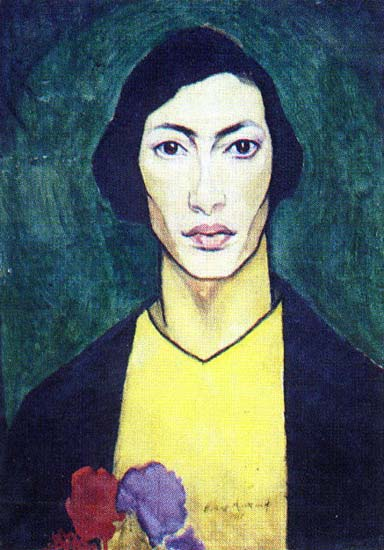
Natan Altman, self-portrait, 1911.

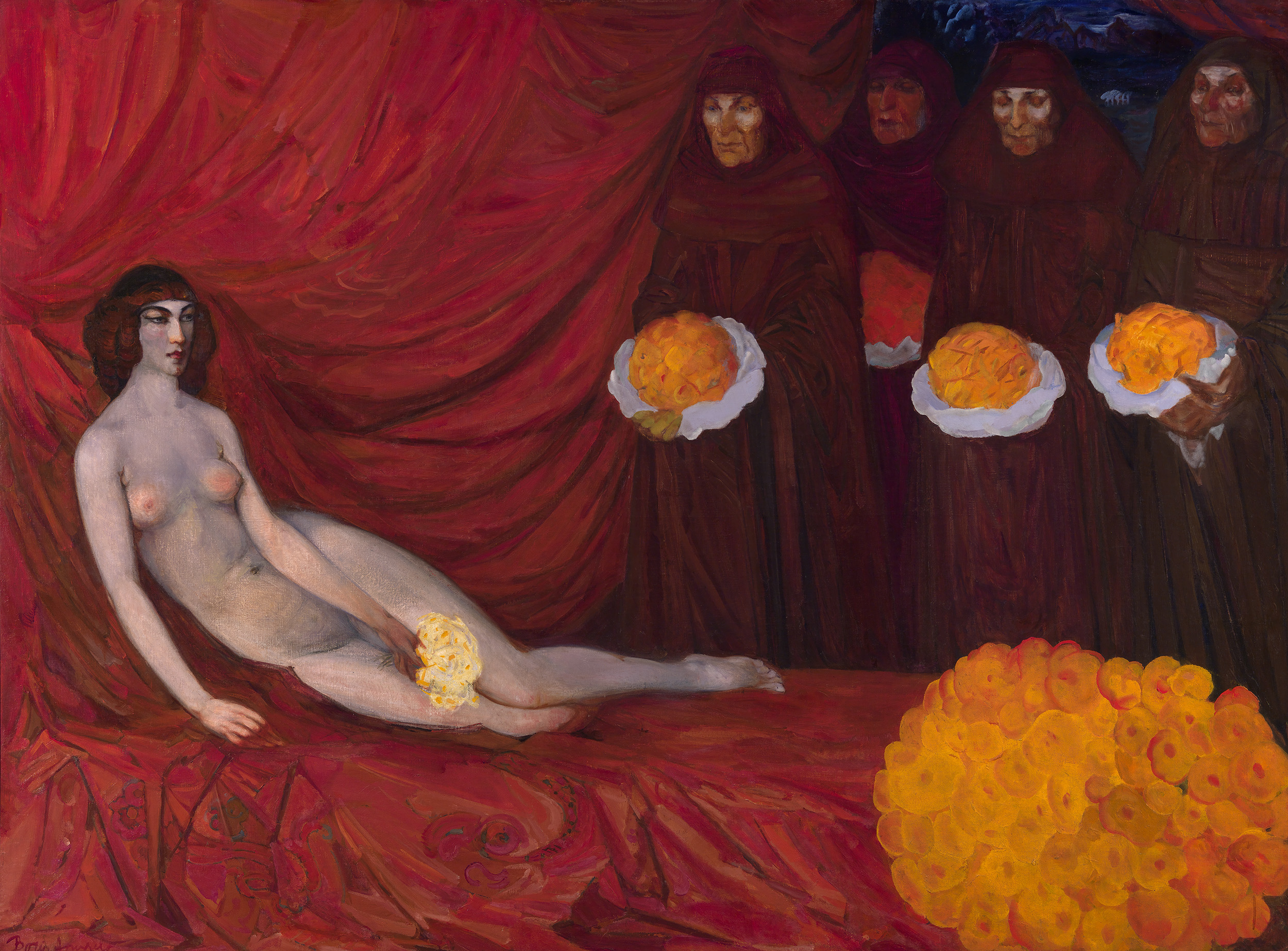
Boris Anisfeld, "The Golden Tribute," ca. 1908.

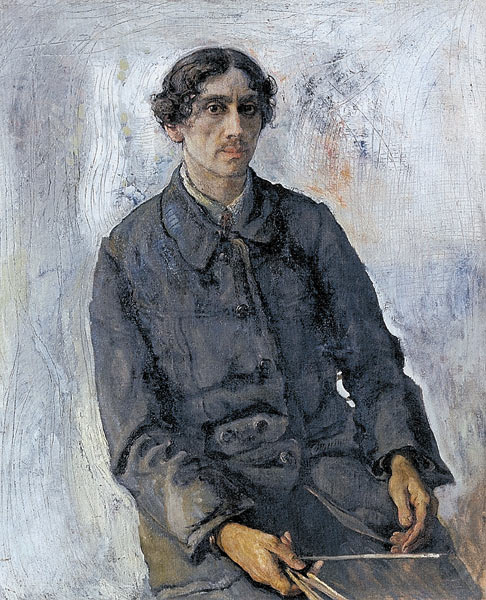
Isaak Brodsky, self-portrait, ca. 1917.

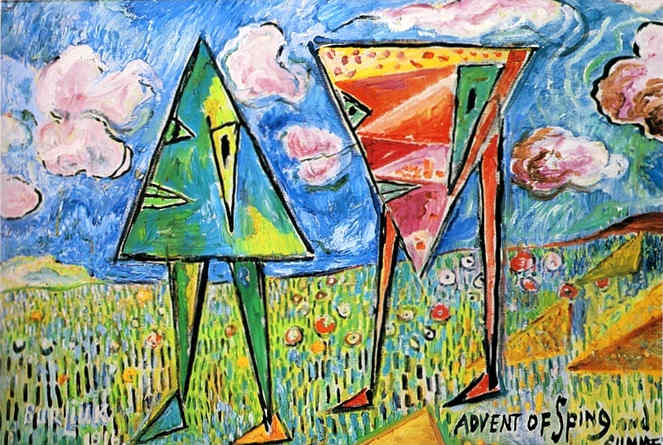
David Burliuk,"Advent of Spring," 1914.

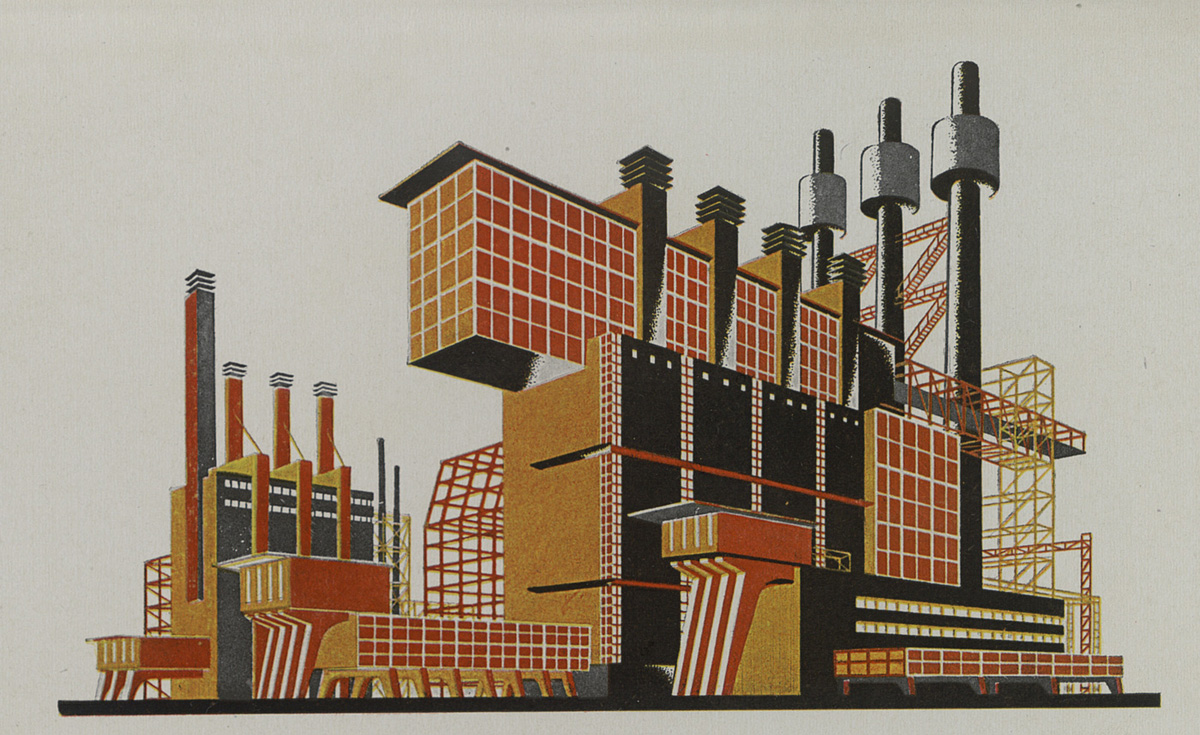
Yakov Chernikhov, "Composition No. 3," from the color printing book The 101 Architectural Fantasies, ca. 1933.

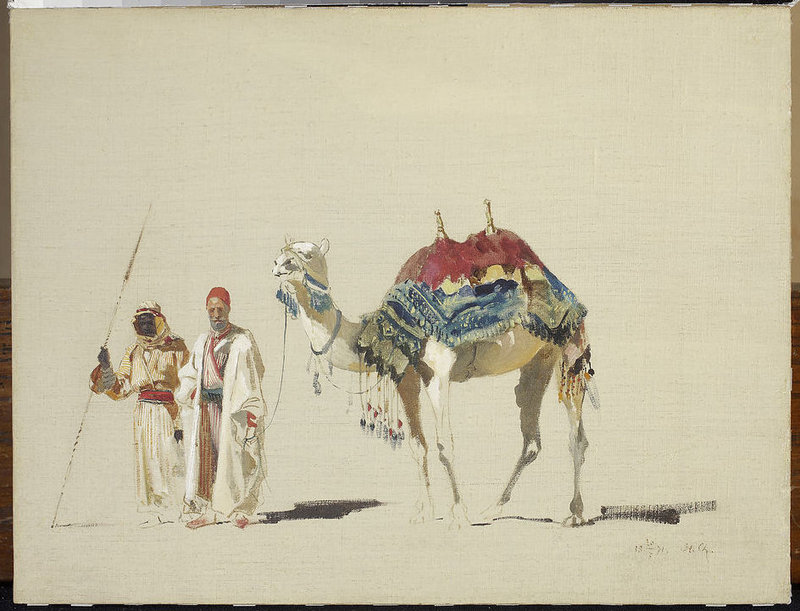
Stanisław Chlebowski, "Sultan’s White Camel," sketch - MP 1059 MNW - National Museum in Warsaw, 1871.

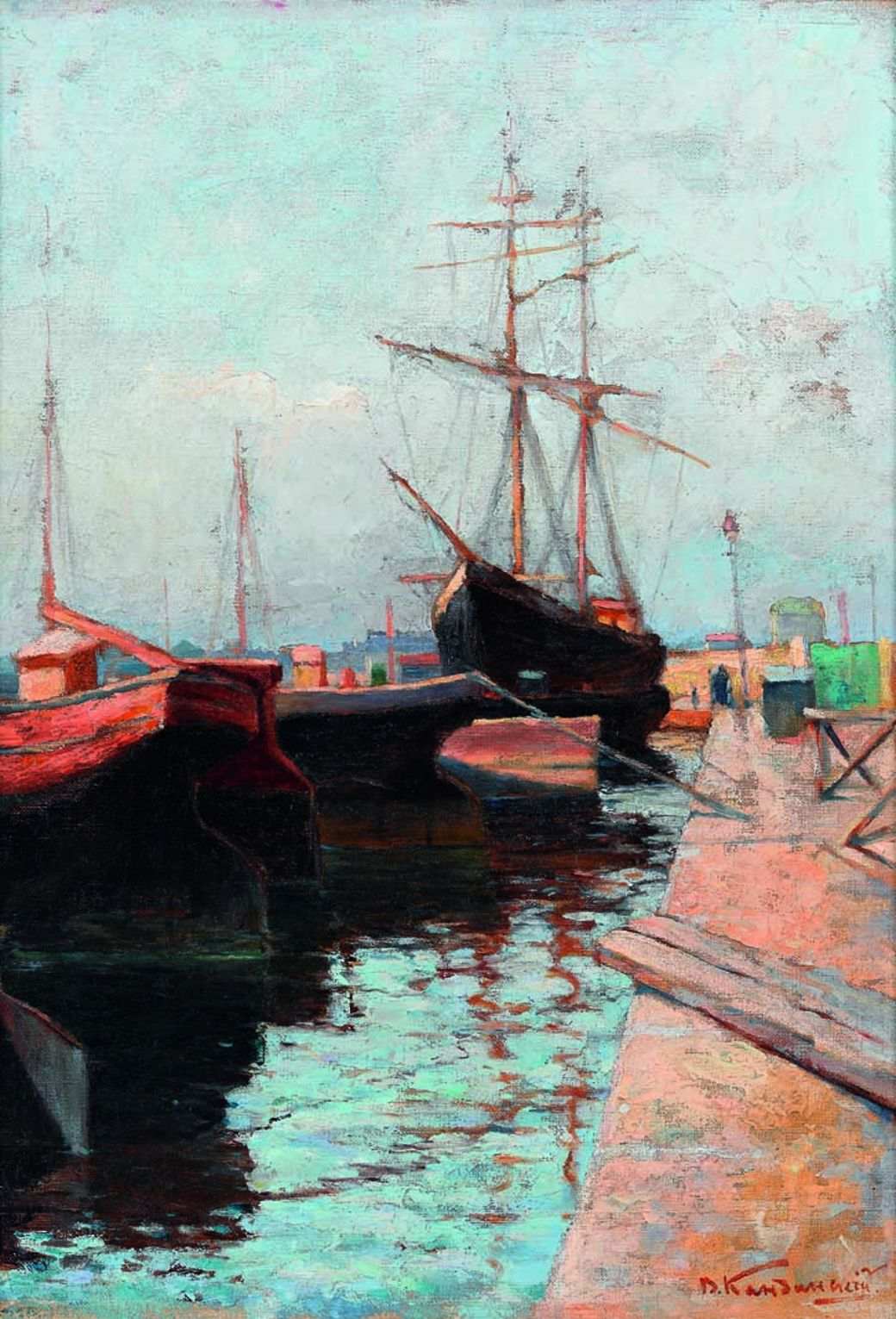
Vassily Kandinsky, "Odesa Port," 1898.

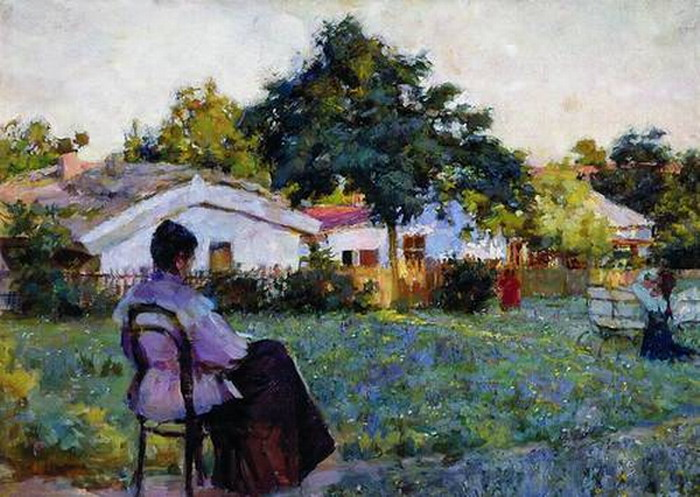
Kyriak Kostandi, "At the Dacha. Noon," 1892.

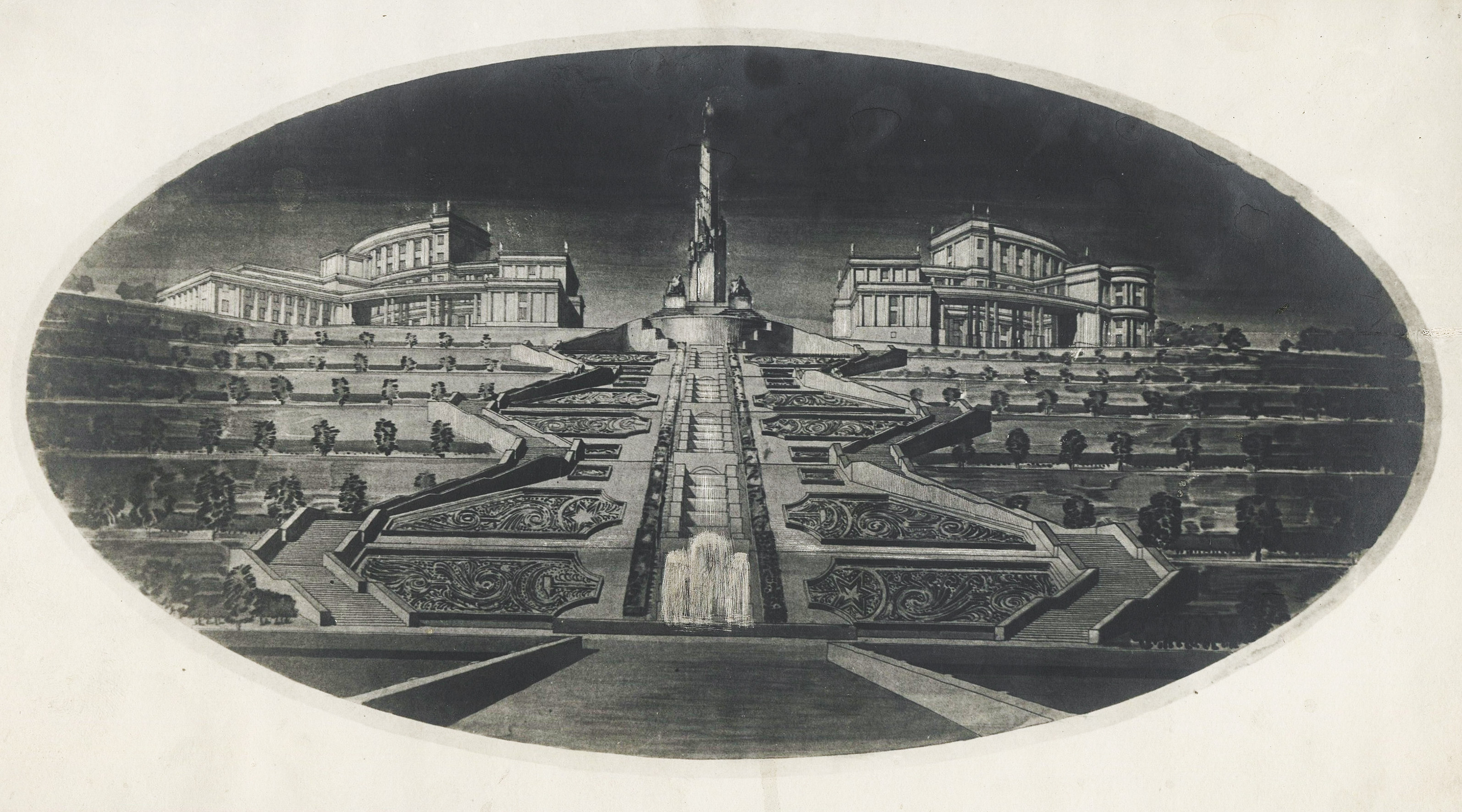
Iosif Langbard, "Preliminary design of the Government Center of Kyiv," 1936.

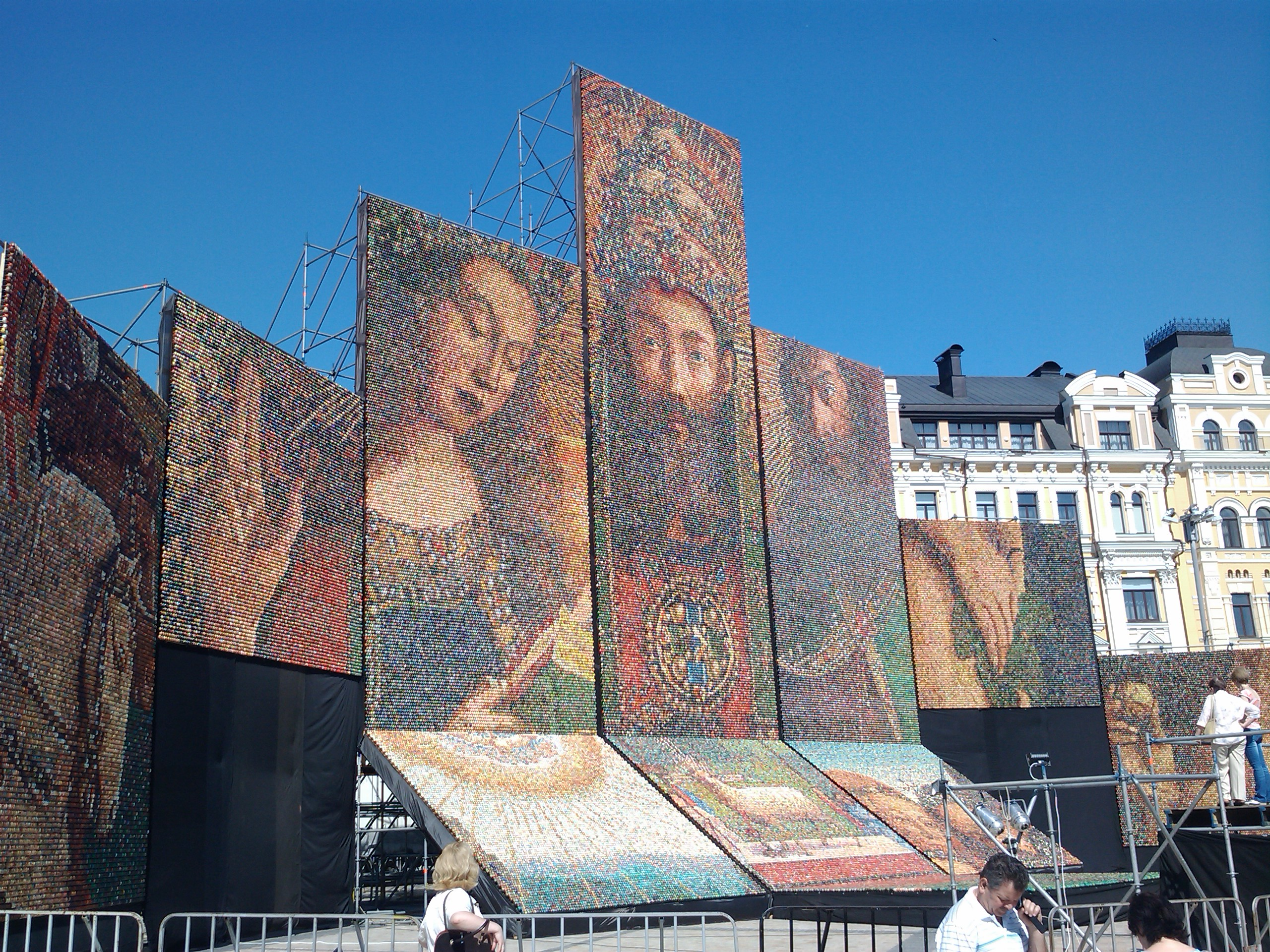
Oksana Mas, "Altar of Nations," Kyiv, 2012.

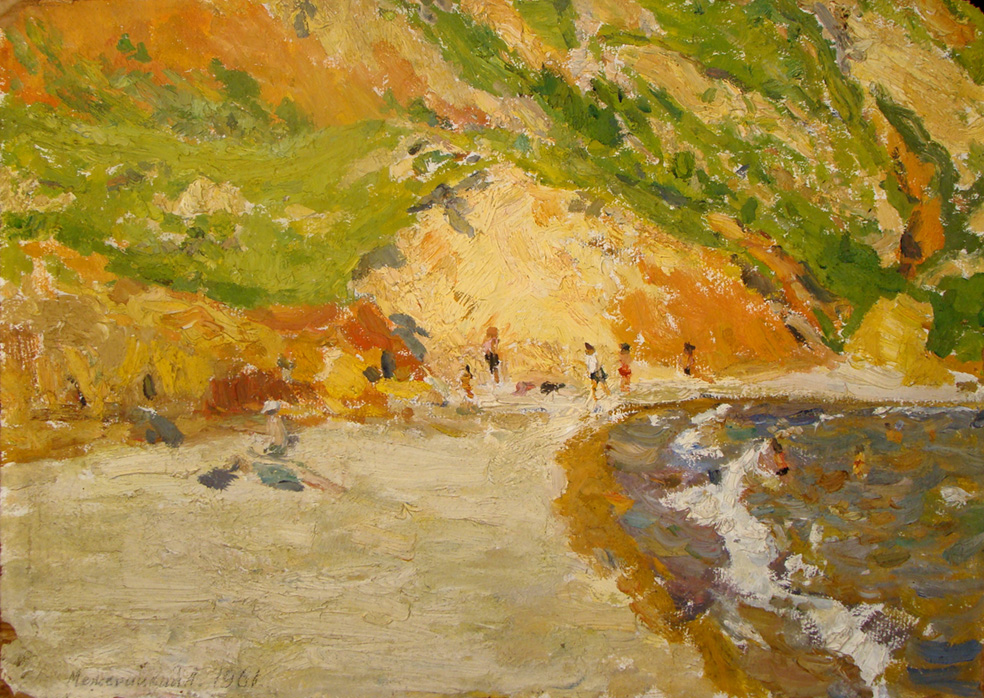
Leonid Mezheritski, "Beach of Bolshoi Fontan," 1961.

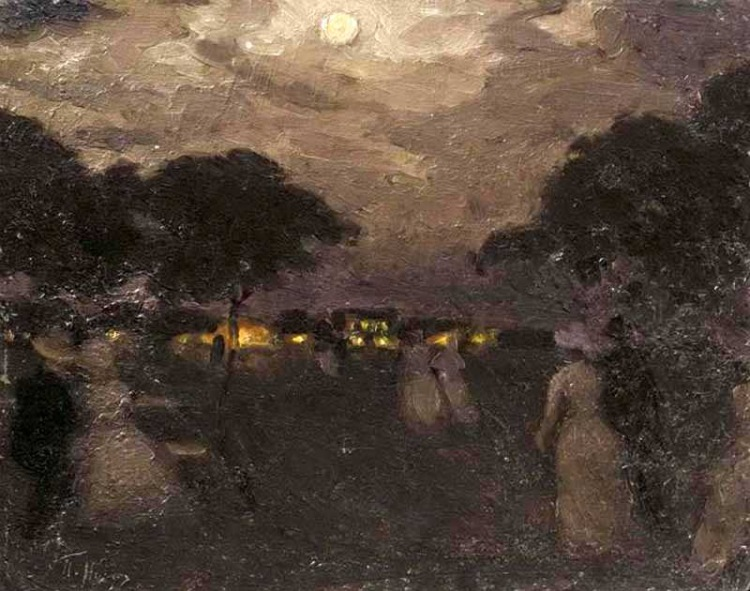
Pyotr Nilus, "Evening Walk," ca. 1943.

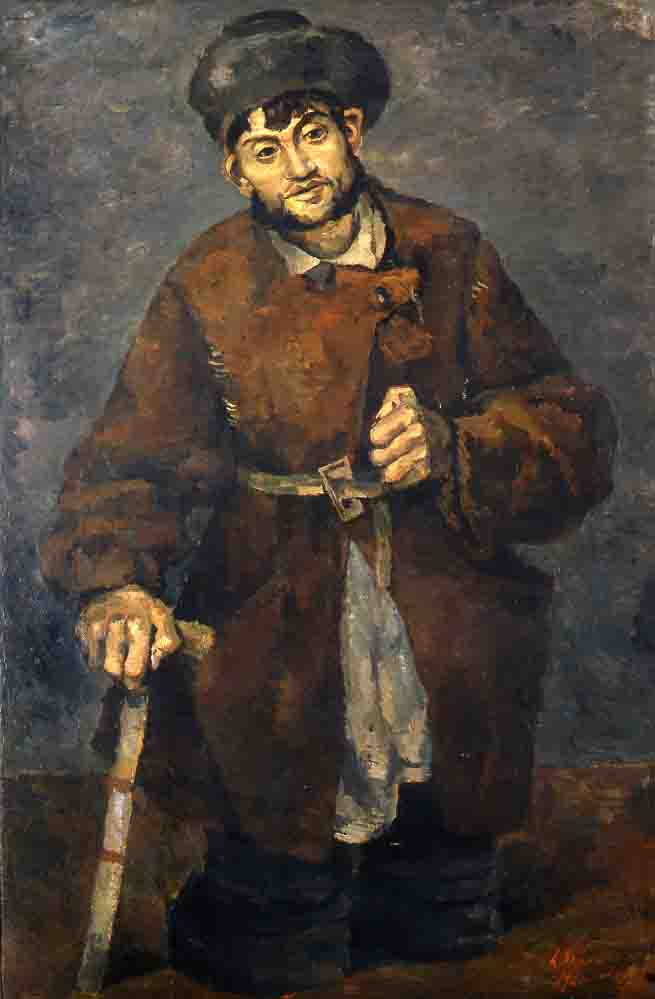
Amshey Nurenberg, "War-Disabled" (Victim of a Jewish Pogrom), 1926.

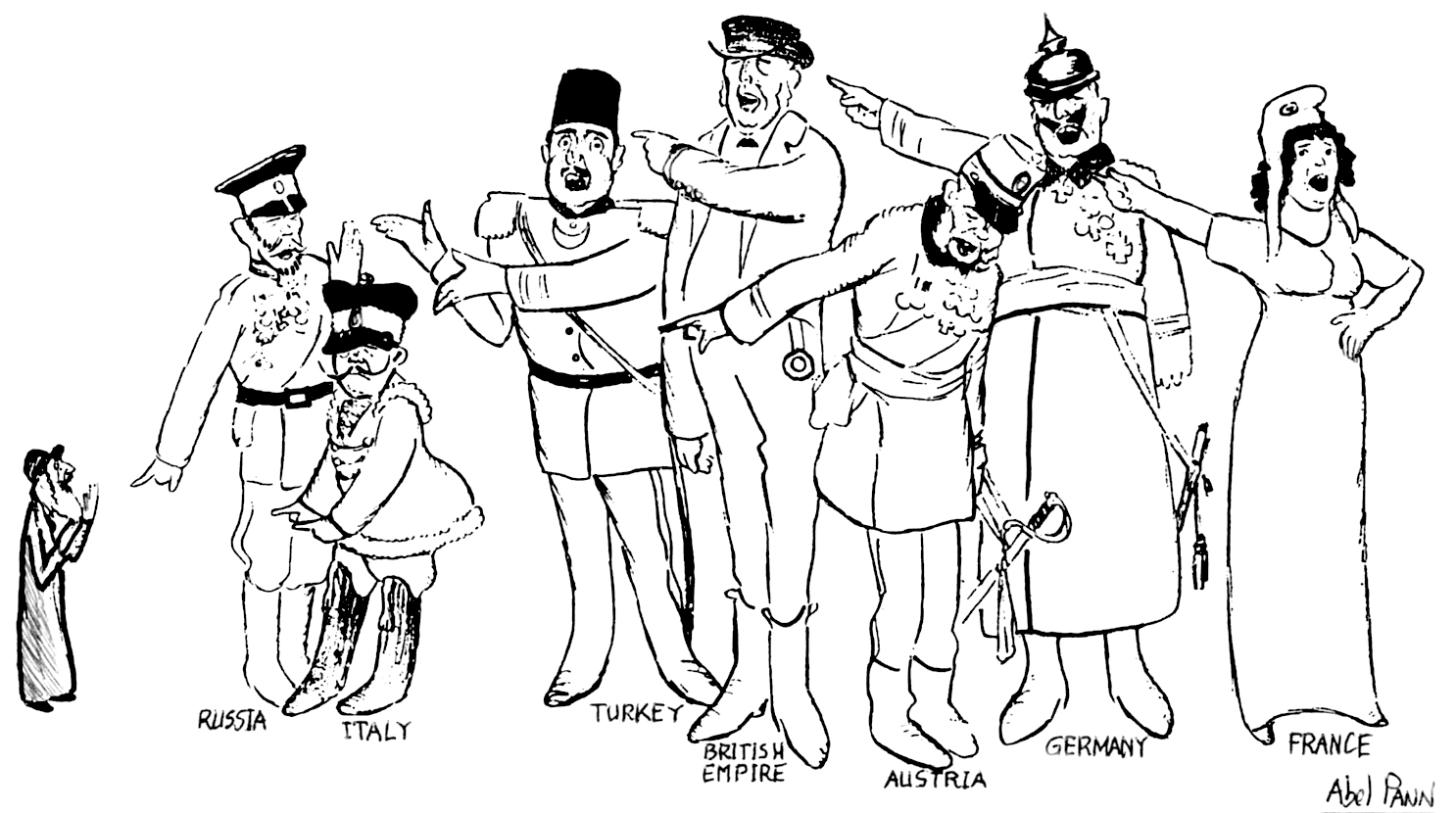
Abel Pann, "The Scapegoat and the Black Sheep of Europe," 1915.

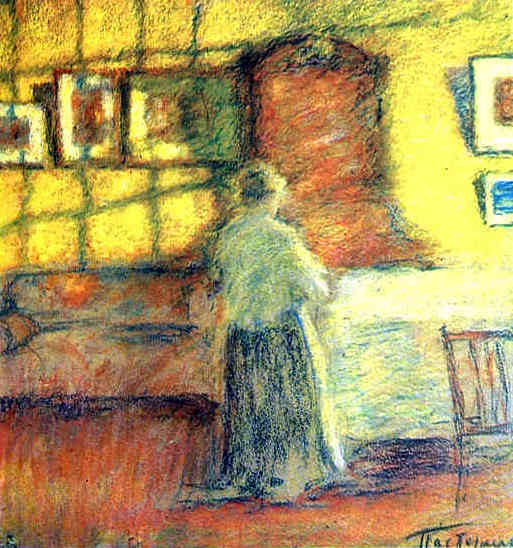
Leonid Pasternak, "A Sun-Beam. Interior." Pastel on paper, n.d.

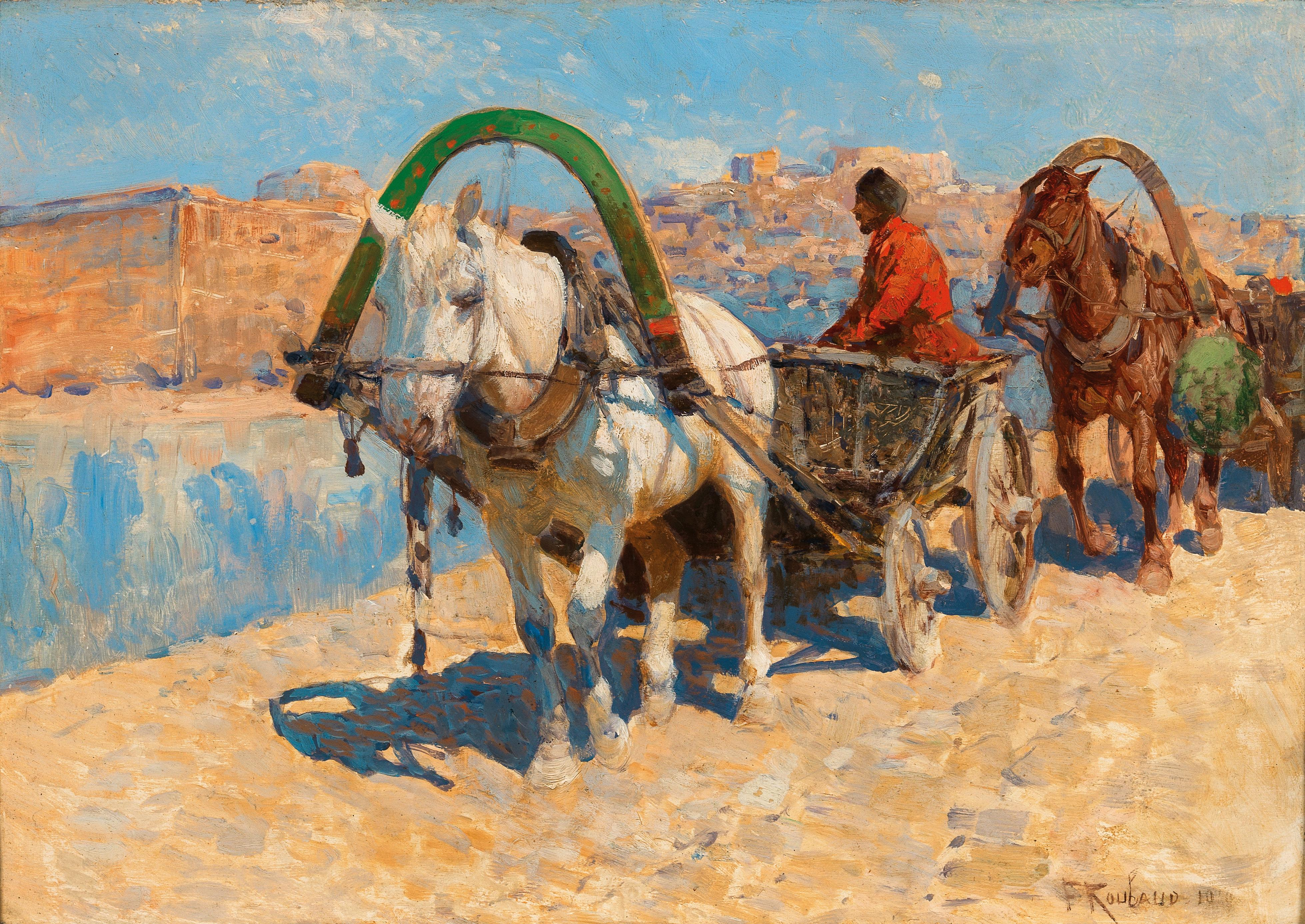
"On the Banks of the Kura in Tbilisi," signed, indistinctly dated F. Roubaud 1916, oil on wood, 31 x 44.5 cm.

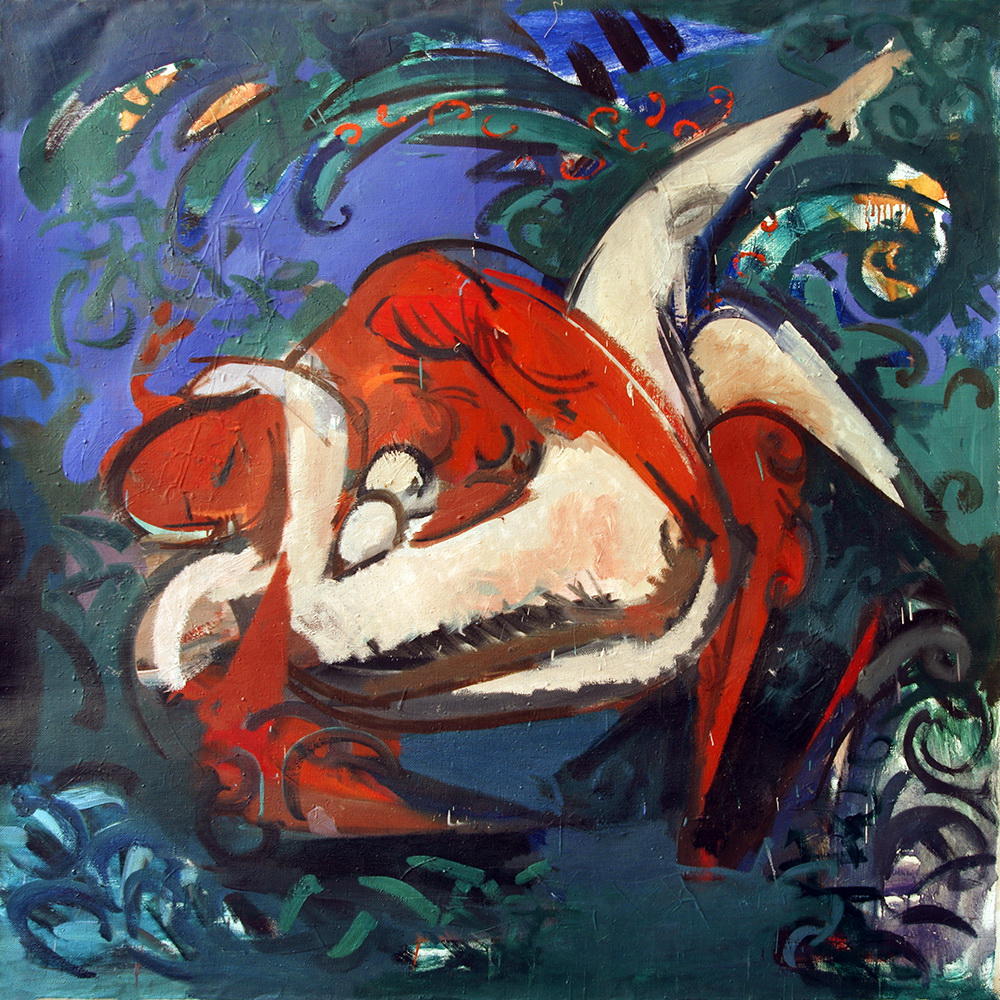
Vasiliy Ryabchenko, "Embrace," oil on canvas, 1986.

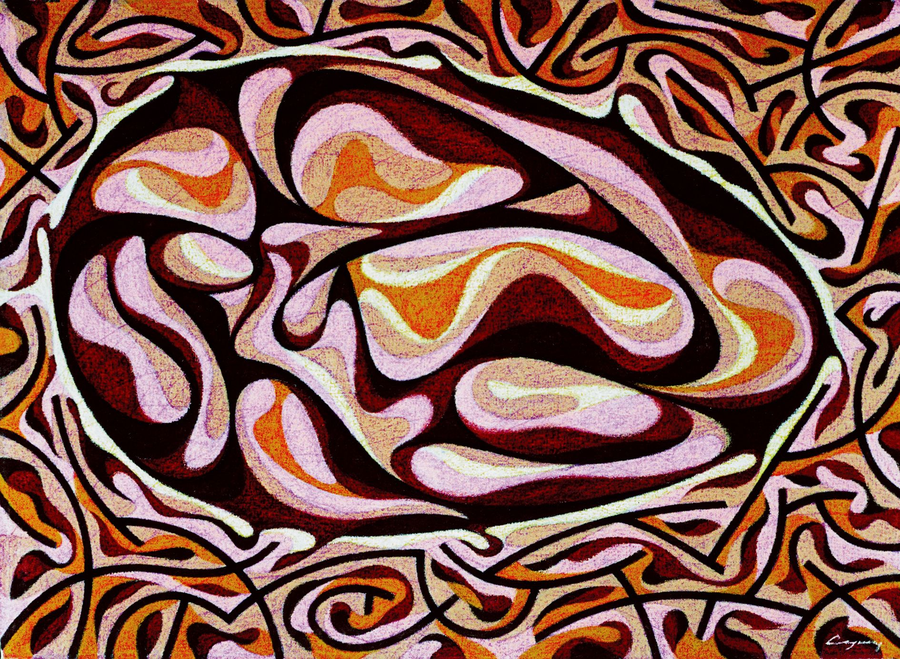
Nikolai Sednin, "Creation," oil on canvas, 1999.

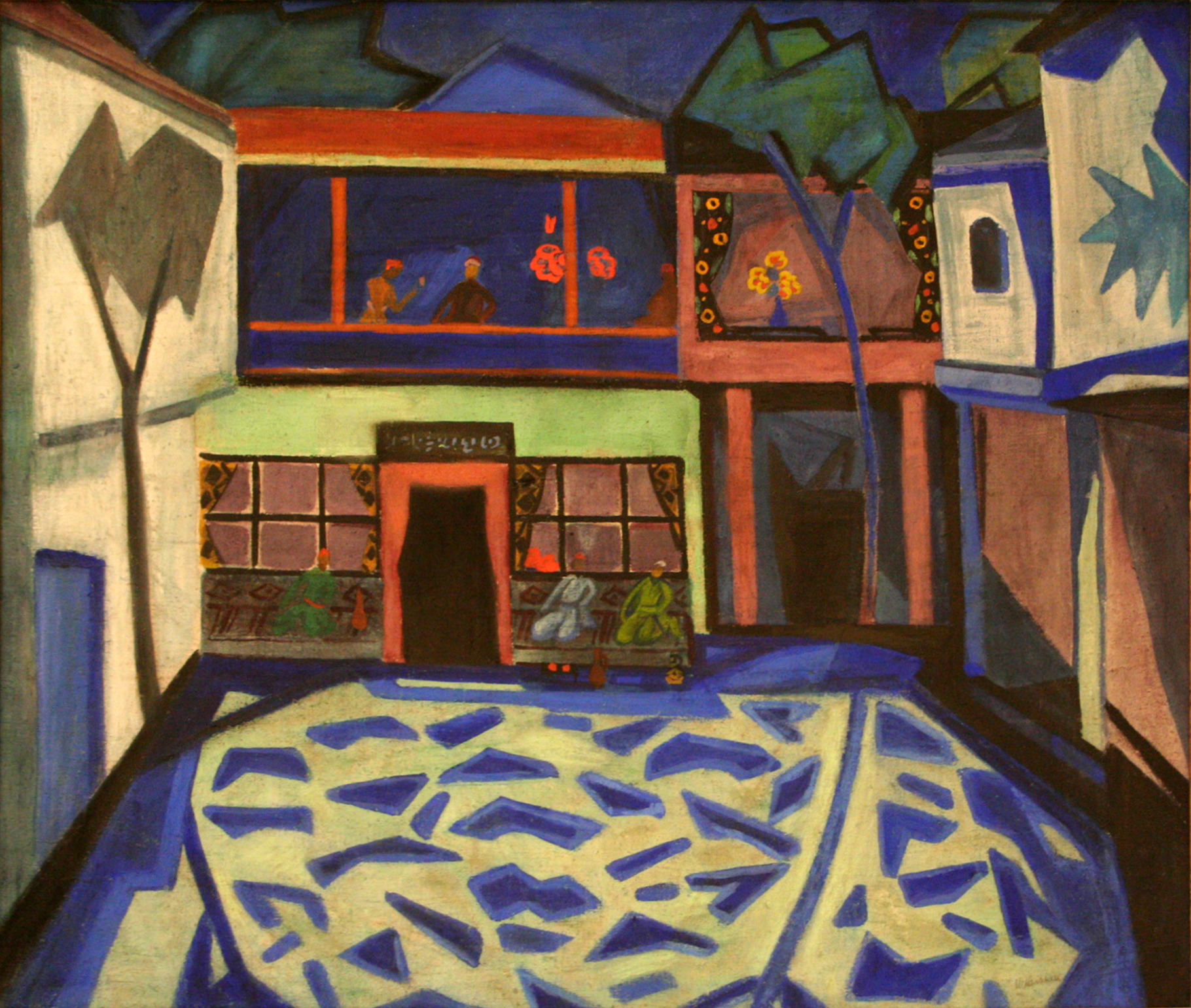
Iosif Shkol'nik, "The Turkish Central Courtyard," 1917.

== Alumni Photos ==
(Selection was limited by availability.)

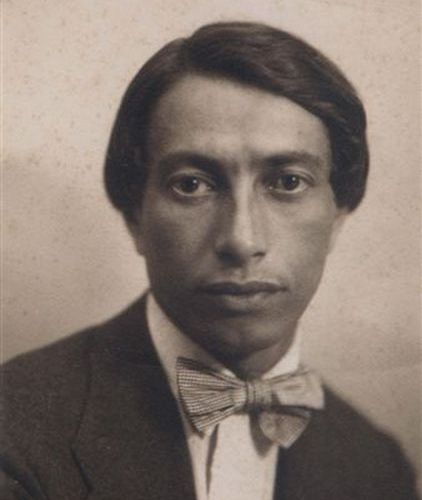
Nathan Altman, 1911.

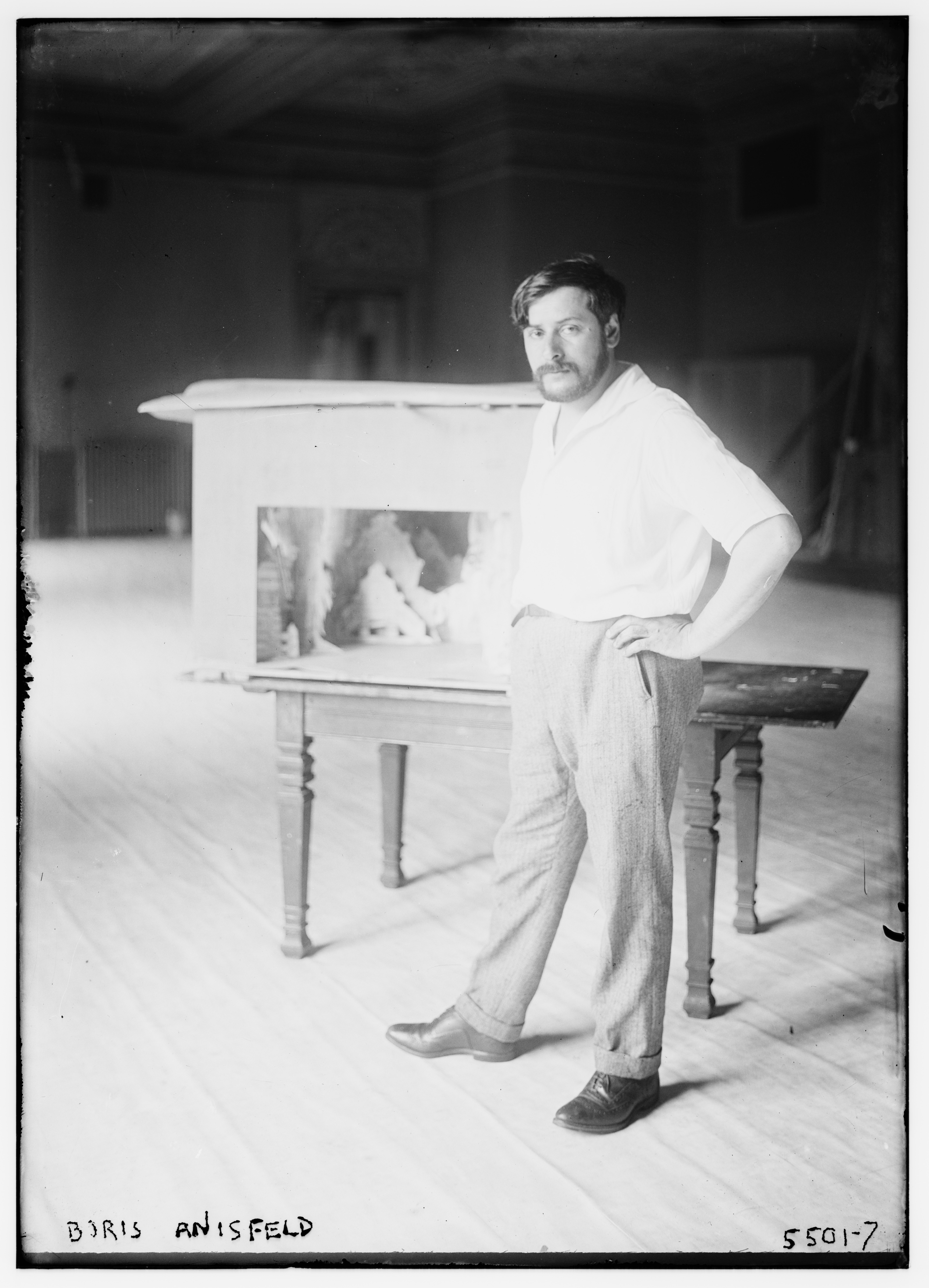
Bois Anisfeld, 1900.

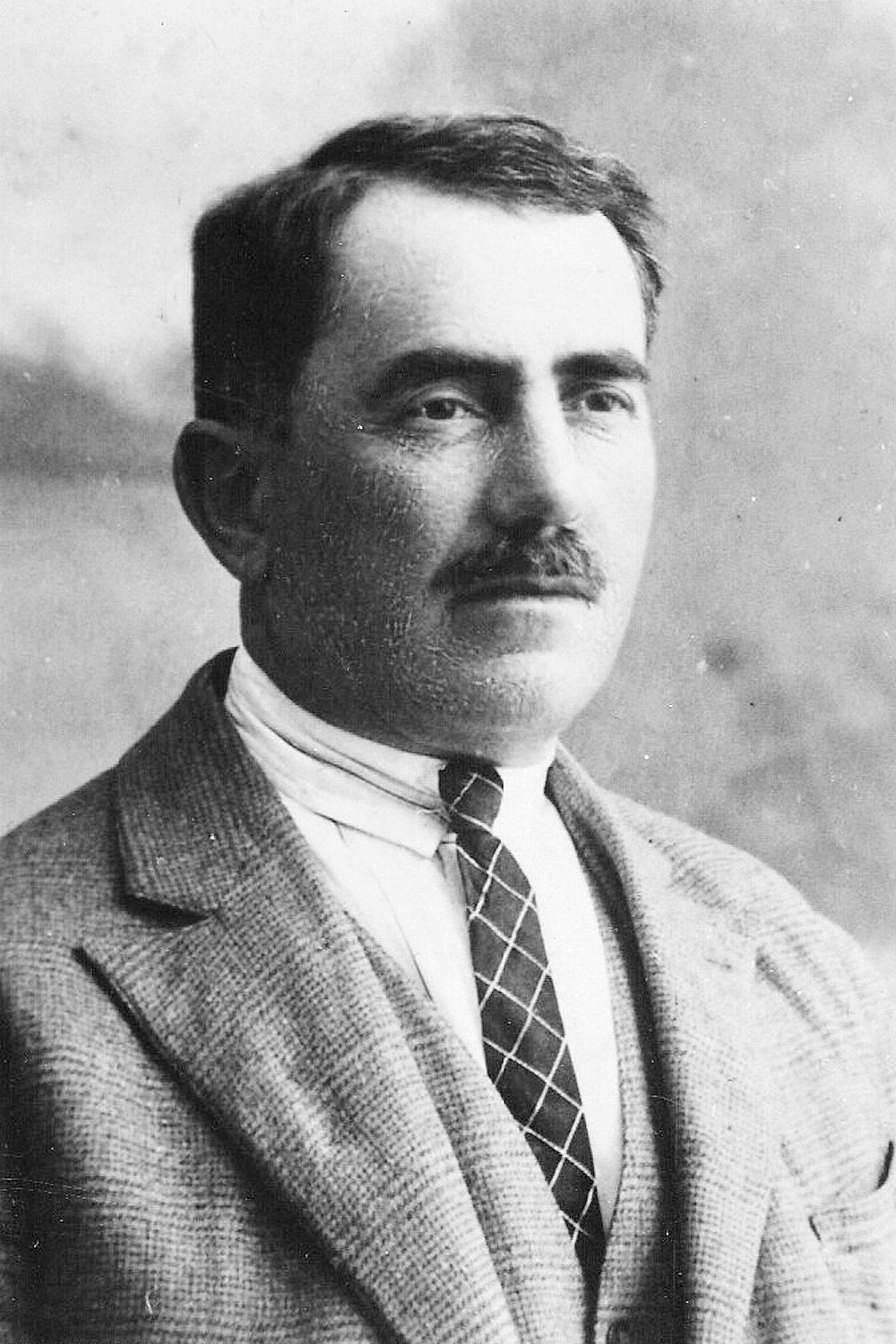
Joseph Barsky, 2025.

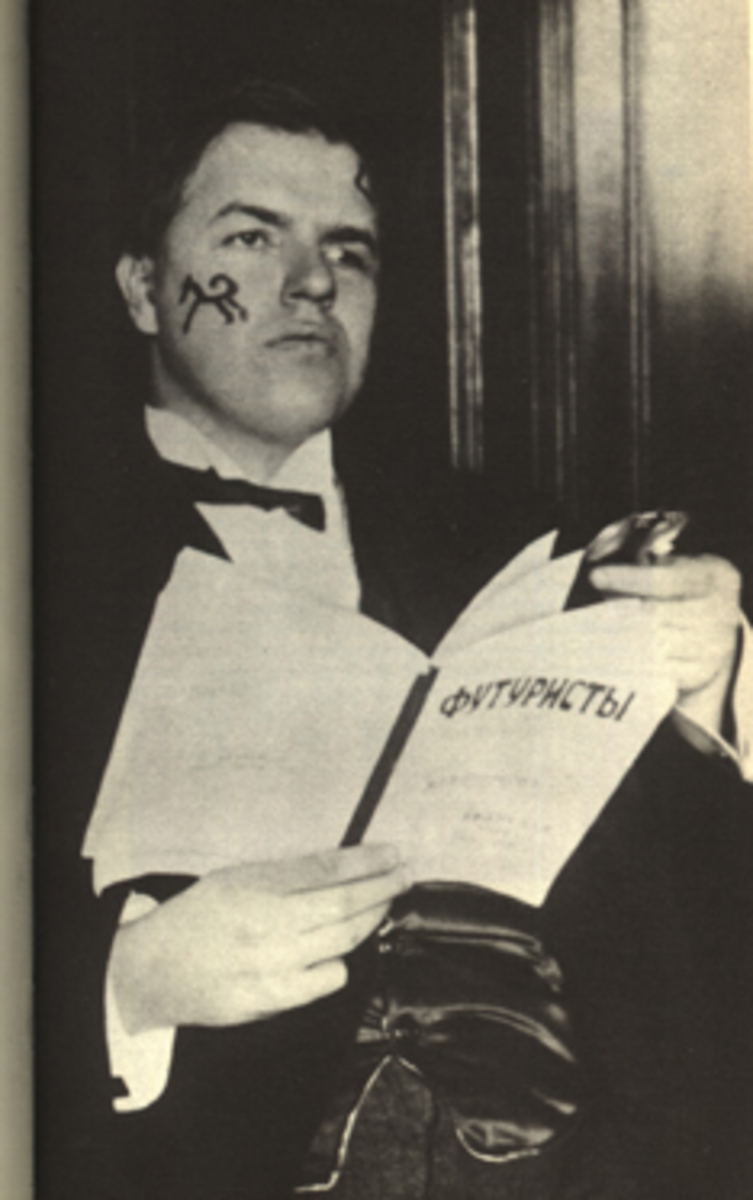
David Burliuk, 1914.

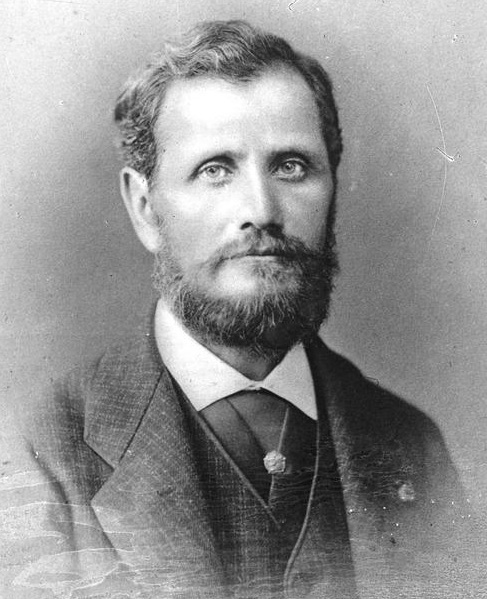
Stanisław Chlebowski,1879.

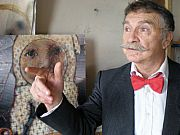
Lucien Dulfan, 2012.

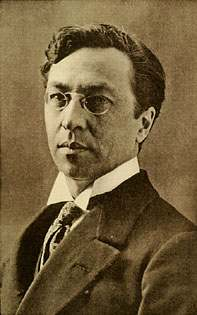
Wassily Kandinsky, 1913.

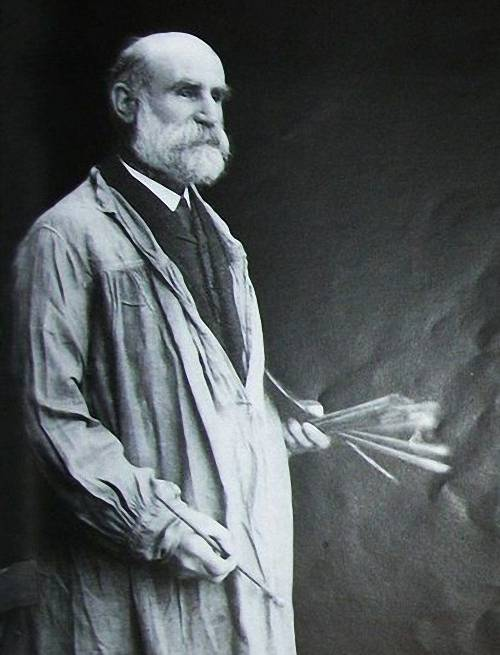
Kiriak Kostandi, 1910.

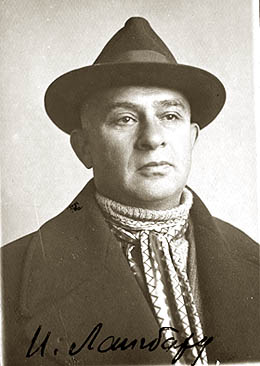
Iosif Langbard, Architect, ca. 1941.

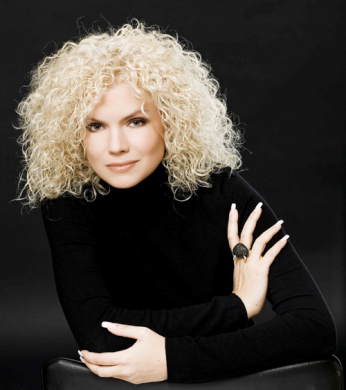
Oksana Mas, 2009.

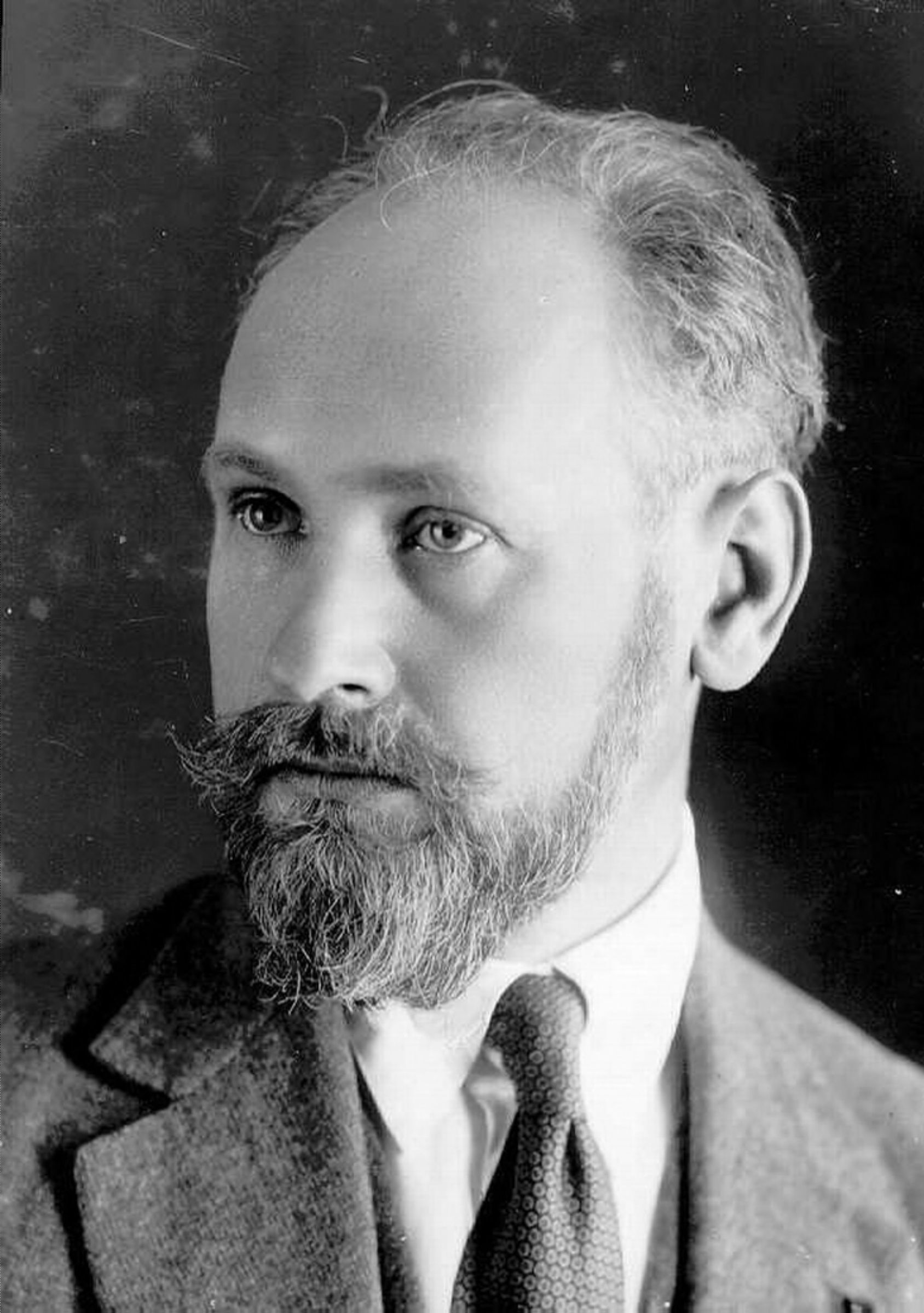
Abel Pann, 1912.

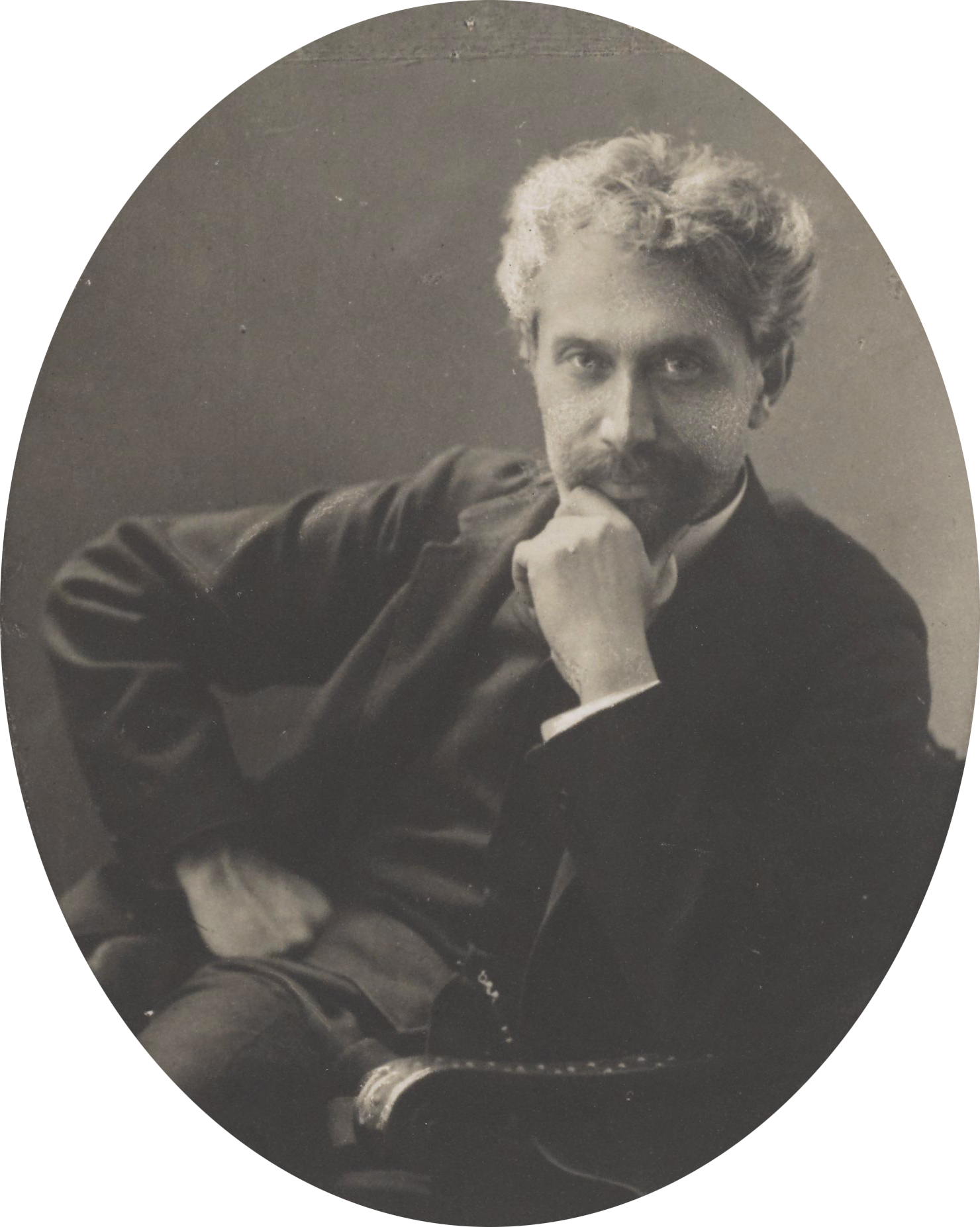
Leonid Pasternak, 1905.

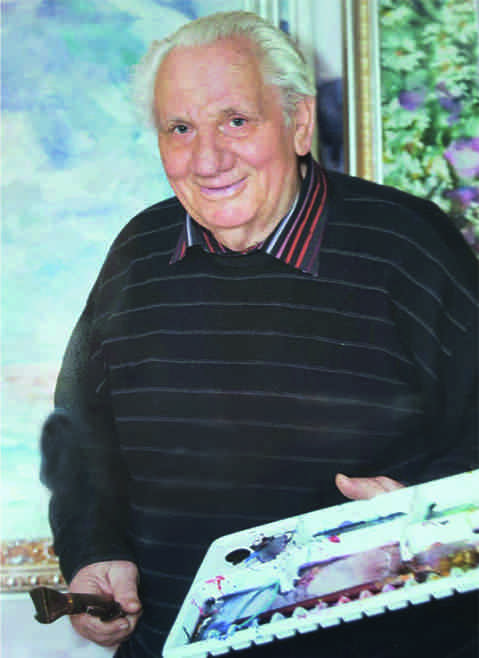
Vasyl Ponikarov, 2008.

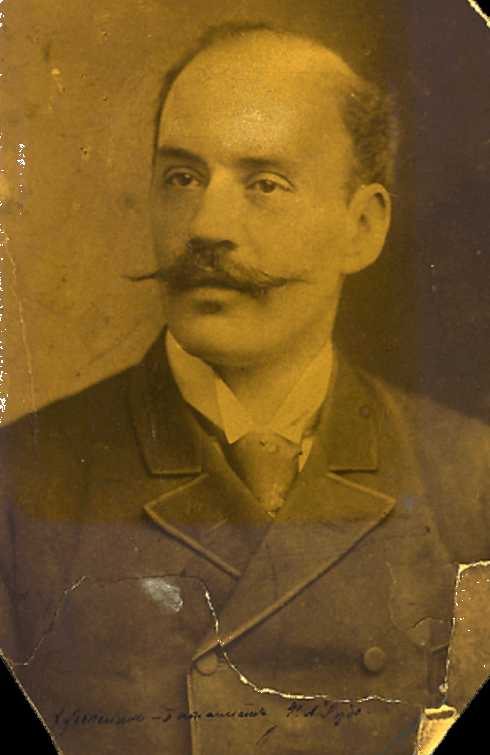
Franz Roubard, ca. 1890.

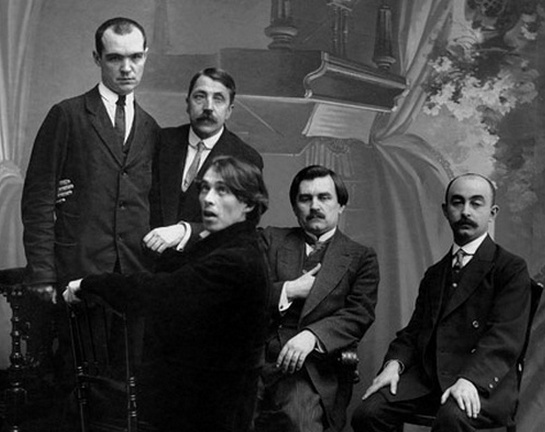
Pavel Filonov, Mikhail Matyushin, Alexei Kruchenykh, Kazimir Malevich, Iosef Shkolnik, 1913.

Oleksii Shovkunenko, n.d.

== Notable alumni ==
- Nathan Altman
- Boris Anisfeld
- Joseph Barsky
- Isaak Brodsky
- David Burliuk
- Yakov Chernikhov
- Stanisław Chlebowski
- Lucien Dulfan
- Samson Flexor
- Vladimir Gorb
- Wassily Kandinsky
- Valentin Khrushch
- Kyriak Kostandi
- Sasha Krasny
- Iosif Langbard
- Oksana Mas
- Michael Matusevitch
- Lev Meshberg
- Leonid Mezheritski
- Pyotr Nilus
- Amshey Nurenberg
- Abel Pann
- Leonid Pasternak
- Vasyl Ponikarov
- Aleksandr Razumny
- Franz Roubaud
- Vasiliy Ryabchenko
- Yuri Salko
- Sergey Savchenko
- Nikolay Sednin
- Iosif Shkolnik
- Oleksii Shovkunenko
- Alexander Stovbur
- Stanislav I. Sychov
- Alexander Telalim
- Oksana Zhnikrup
