= Michael Matusevitch =

Ukrainian painter

Michael Matusevitch (1929–2007) was a painter. He started his painting career at school, where he was the class painter.

== Early life and wartime ==
Matusevitch was born in Odesa, Ukraine in 1929. In 1941, Matusevitch and his brothers went for a summer vacation in the country with their grandparents. After two weeks, war broke out and it was impossible to return to his parents in Odesa, resulting in a long separation from their parents. The war period was hard. Matusevitch fled from the Nazis, making his way on foot and later by train, often exposed to bombing attacks. He passed cities in flames, suffered hunger and was wounded in the leg.

In the end, the group reached Tadzhikistan in Central Asia, and there Matusevitch finished grade school. The local population was made up of Moslems and a Russian minority, who suffered from an unfriendly, anti-Semitic and even cruel attitude, according to Matusevitch. Matusevitch spent many hours painting at that time; he made postcard copies of large paintings, and painted portraits from photographs. He tried to use oil colors for the first time, and since a few shades were missing, he mixed oil colors with gouache and acrylics. Matusevitch stood for hours watching the painters at work in the craft center beside his house.

== Odesa ==
At the end of the war, the family returned to Odesa in 1945. Matusevitch got a job as a welder in a factory, but he dreamed of being a painter, and to study in the Grekov Odesa Art school. At the age of 19, Matusevitch passed the entrance examinations and was accepted despite heavy competition and the unofficial restrictions regarding Jews. His dream had come true. Matusevitch began his studies with great enthusiasm, but they were cut short in the middle of the first course, as he was recruited into the Red Army. Matusevitch served four years as a sailor on the Baltic Sea. He never saw his parents, but despite that, he used his time well in study, painting portraits of his friends and taking part in group exhibitions.

== Study ==
In 1953, Matusevitch returned to his study for an additional five years. The students were required to paint in the Socialist Realism mode, an outcome of the well-known slogan that the arts belonged to the people, and therefore the artist was the servant of the people. Modern art was avoided, as it was regarded as bourgeois and therefore unacceptable.

In 1958, Matusevitch finished his studies. His parents, with whom he lived, helped him devote much of his time to painting. On this he says: "It was always important to me to paint what was close to my view on life. I was in a large Soviet city and from a Jewish family. My point of view was in a measure Jewish. I saw the closely packed life of the Jewish street, and this helped me to describe in painting the special atmosphere of Odesa. Some blamed me for painting Odesa as a village and not as a modern, official Soviet city. But this was the Odesa I loved. I felt that this atmosphere, so unique, was gradually disappearing."

== Influential painter ==
An important painter who greatly influenced Matusevitch was Vincent van Gogh. When an exhibition of Van Gogh arrived in Moscow from the Netherlands, Matusevitch hurried to see it. He found many things in common with the great artist: an outlook of the world, a total devotion to art and also a ritual inclination in painting.

In 1962, Matusevitch participated in a group exhibition of Odesa artists. An article written on the exhibition noted and praised his painting: "A Spring Day with Horses." Subsequently, the artist participated in many exhibitions organized by the confederation of painters in Odesa. The authorities were not enamored with his style and urged him to paint political subjects of note, but the public did like him very much, which was important for the artist. Pressure from the political establishment was the lot of many artists, among them several of Matusevitch's friends: the painters Lev Mezberg, Leonid Mezheritski, Yosef Ostrovsky, Shenkar and, closest to him, the excellent painter and poet, Alexander Richter.

== Israel ==
In 1974, he arrived in Israel and immediately felt a deep affinity with the landscape, as though he had been there before, and he depicted the country in paint. Here, Matusevitch met Rima Kravitz, a doctor who loved art. In 1975, he married her, and he relates: "Rima admires me and helps me. I give her the credit for many of my successes." Matusevitch received a warm welcome in Israel. A long list of exhibitions, a lecturer's post at the People University and membership in the painters’ confederation, while he continued to create and establish himself in the Israeli family of artists.

In 1987, Matusevitch finally opened his own gallery in Tel Aviv. He had people passing by, events, he sold some of his paintings, and he kept painting new ones. It was a dream that came true for Matusevitch.

== Death and legacy ==
Matusevitch died in 2007, after an illness he suffered for the last few years of his life. Matusevitch left behind him more than 400 paintings, which stayed since then in the gallery, that was close the whole time. Rima Kravitz, he's wife, didn't have the time and courage to manage the gallery, as a full-time doctor, although she wanted very much.

In 2017, Matusevitch's grandson – Bar Matusevitch, in his twenties, decided to take responsibility for the gallery. As times changed, he created an online gallery, together with Rima, as they realized that was what Matusevitch would have want the most – all of his paintings are available worldwide.
