= Sasha Krasny =

Russian poet and writer

Sasha Krasny Саша Красный
- Born: 28 September [O.S. 16 September] 1882; Sevastopol, Russian Empire
- Died: 2 March 1995 (aged 112 years, 155 days); Moscow, Russia
- Other names: Aleksandr Davydovich Bryansky (penname)
- Education: Grekov Odessa Art school
- Occupations: poet, songwriter
- Children: Boris Bryansky (1928－1972)
- Awards: Cross of St. George

Sasha Krasny (Russian: Саша Красный, literally Alexander the Red) was the pen-name of Aleksandr Davydovich Bryansky (Russian: Александр Давыдович Брянский; 28 September [O.S. 16 September] 1882 – 2 March 1995), a Russian poet and songwriter. His first book was published in Odessa in 1912 and the last in 1993. His son Boris Bryansky (1928–1972) was also a poet and songwriter.

== Biography ==
Bryansky said he was born in 1882 in Sevastopol, into a Jewish family. After graduating from Grekov Odessa Art school which he entered in 1908, Bryansky performed on stage under the pseudonym of Sasha Krasny. In 1914 he was drafted into Russian Army and fought in World War I. According to his own account, he was wounded and awarded with a St. George's Cross, 4th Degree.

After the October Revolution he joined the Red Army and became one of Vladimir Lenin's bodyguards. Along with fellow Odesite writers such as Ilya Ilf and Yevgeni Petrov he published his poems in the Gudok newspaper, a mouthpiece for the Soviet Ministry of Transport. He helped initiate the agitprop movement of "Blue shirts" which took its name from his 1923 collection of poetry, "The Blue Blouse" (Russian: Синяя блуза).

In the mid-1920s Krasny led a circle of amateur performers who sought to popularize Bolshevik ideology by touring the country with skits, songs, and recitations of poems. The show was called the Sasha Krasny Theatre and continued well into the 1930s. He also found time to publish several collections of songs.

Krasny was not active as a poet from that time until the 1980s. When he joined the USSR Union of Writers in 1984, he was already 102 years old. In his old age he concentrated on love themes. His collection "The Contrasts" appeared in 1990 and "Only About Love" three years later. This last collection of verse was published when he was 111.

== Death ==
Krasny died in 1995 at the claimed age of 112 in Moscow and was buried at the New Donskoy Cemetery there. His supercentenarian age was never independently confirmed. His final publication was a memoir about Sergei Yesenin.
