= Lucien Dulfan =

American painter (born 1942)

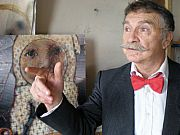
- Born: Lucien Veniaminovich Dulfan; 14 February 1942 (age 84); Frunze, Kyrgyz SSR
- Education: Grekov Odessa Art school
- Known for: Painting
- Movement: Dulfanism
- Spouse: Dinah Leonidovna Dulfan
- Awards: First prize (painting, 1975); USSR Ministry of Culture

Lucien Dulfan (Russian: Люсьен Вениаминович Дульфан) (born 14 February 1942, Frunze, Kyrgyz SSR) is a Soviet-born conceptualist artist, resident in the United States since 1990. During his career in the USSR, he was considered a Nonconformist artist.

== Biography ==
Lucien Dulfan was born in 1942 in Bishkek (then called Frunze, capital of Kyrgyz Soviet Socialist Republic) during World War II, where his family was evacuated. The family returned to Odessa in 1946. After finishing his school he was accepted to the Grekov Odessa Art school from which he graduated in 1963. He became a member of the Artists' Union of the USSR in 1973, while working as an illustrator for the newspaper "Komsomolskaya Iskra". Lucien Dulfan emigrated with his family to the United States in 1990, settling in New York City.

== Work ==
Lucien Dulfan works with objects and installation art and creates so called "wooden paintings".

== Exhibitions ==
- 2014 — Odessa's Second Avant-Garde: City and Myth (Zimmerly Art Museum, New Brunswick, USA)
- 2012 — Broadway Gallery at Fountain Art Fair (New York, USA)
- 2011 — Space. Mythogony (Gallery Tadzio, Kyiv, Ukraine)
- 1989 — Museum of Western and Eastern Art, Odessa, USSR

== Selected collections ==
Dulfan's work is included in the collections of The Museum of Odessa Modern Art and the Nancy Dodge Collection at Zimmerli Art Museum at Rutgers University in New Brunswick., and Tretyakov gallery in Moscow, Tomskiy Oblastnoy Khudozhestvennyy Muzey

== Publications ==
- 1994 — Artists to "Literaturnaya Gazeta"
- 1992 — Glastnost Under Glass. Gorbachev from the artist's perspective
