= Oleksii Shovkunenko =

Soviet painter (1884–1974)

Oleksii Shovkunenko Олексій Шовкуненко PPUSSR
- Born: March 21, 1884; Kherson, Russian Empire
- Died: March 12, 1974; Kyiv, Ukrainian SSR
- Resting place: Baikove Cemetery, Kyiv
- Education: Saint Petersburg Academy of Arts
- Occupation: Painter
- Awards: Shevchenko National Prize

Oleksii Oleksiiovych Shovkunenko (Ukrainian: Олексій Олексійович Шовкуненко; 21 March 1884 – 12 March 1974) was a Ukrainian Soviet painter and teacher, and from 1947 on a member of the USSR Academy of Arts.

Shovkunenko was born in the city of Kherson, in the Kherson Governorate of the Russian Empire (in the Kherson Oblast of present-day Ukraine).

Shovkunenko was a graduate of the Grekov Odesa Art School in 1908 and the Saint Petersburg Academy of Arts in 1917. He took part in the exhibitions of the Society of South Russian Artists from 1913 to 1919 and was a member of the Kostandi Society of Artists from 1924 to 1929. He taught at the Odessa Art Polytechnic from 1926 to 1929 and at the Art Institute from 1929 to 1935 and later at the Kyiv State Art Institute from 1936 to 1963.

Shovkunenko painted many portraits, including some of prominent Ukrainian cultural figures (such as Pavlo Tychyna, Mykola Lysenko, and Oleksandr Bohomolets) and also he painted landscapes of Ukraine, Moscow and other areas.
