= Nikolay Sednin =

Russian painter

Nikolay Sednin Николай Седнин
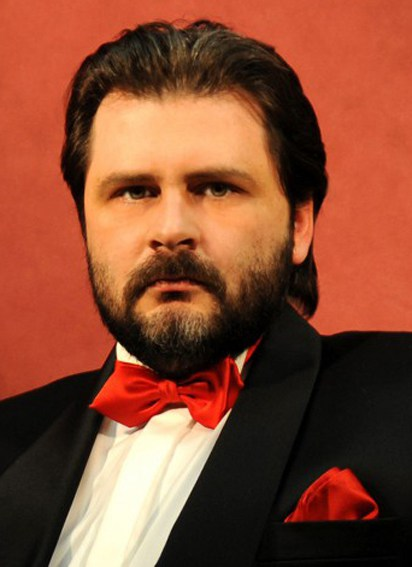
- Born: 25 December 1968 (age 57); Izmail, Ukraine
- Citizenship: Russian
- Education: Grekov Odesa Art School
- Occupation: Artist
- Style: painting, photography, design, literature, art history, public figure
- Website: www.sedninmuseum.com

Nikolay Nikolaevich Sednin (Russian: Николай Николаевич Седнин, born 25 December 1968) is a Russian painter, founder of Di-Art and the Heliography style, writer, art historian, public figure. General Director of the Professional Union of Artists of Russia (from 2013 to 2018), Academician of the Russian Academy of Art Criticism (from 2013), Chairman of the Editorial Board of the ELITARCH National Award (since 2013), Chairman of the jury of the international competition Art. Excellence. Awards (since 2015), chief production designer of the Moscow theater "Avalon Ars Terra" (since 2015) , Honored Artist of Russia (since 2016), Honorary President of the International Academy of Contemporary Arts (2019), People's Writer of Russia (since 2019), Doctor of Arts.

== Biography ==
Nikolay Sednin was born in Izmail, Ukraine. He began painting in 1974, and in 1979 he became a participant in the first major exhibition. From 1987 to 1991, he studied at the Grekov Odesa Art School. A few years later he was elected to the Board of the Odesa Art Fund. From 1989 to 1992, Nikolai conducted an art experiment, which culminated in the creation of a poetry collection, Drawings from Words (Publishing House Versiya, Odesa, 1996). Nikolai first came to Moscow in 1994 to participate in a major art project, Mystical Reality. In 1996, the State Tretyakov Gallery's Art Council granted Nikolai Sednin the right to open a personal exhibition in this museum. In 1998, Nikolai Sednin moved to Russia and currently works in Moscow. Work on custom painted portraits began after the artist moved to Moscow. In 2000, Nikolai Sednin – the author of the first full-length portrait of the President of the Russian Federation Vladimir Putin.

In 2002, in the State Duma of the Russian Federation, works from the series Portraits were presented in the project «Dee-Art – Art of the 21st Century. In 2012, the portrait of Vladimir Etush The Great Illusionist is exhibited as part of the international art project of the Ardena Gallery Masterpieces of the Future and the Present. The works of outstanding contemporary artists and antique paintings of the XVIII – XX centuries.

Since 2002, Nikolai Sednin has been involved in photography at the Sednin Studio Company that he created. The beauty of the images of the female body was reflected in the cycles of his photocompositions Cocoon, Cell, Mystical Sisters.

In 2011, in Paris, at the largest in Europe competition PX3 PRIX DE LA PHOTOGRAPHIE PARIS, photocompositions from the Cell cycle were awarded two gold medals in the categories Fine Art / Nudes – Professional and People's Choice Awards. In 2012, works from this cycle were awarded the Trierenberg Super Circuit Gold Medal Of Excellence at the World Photographic Oscars Competition. In 2012, the name of the artist was included in the international Internet project of the Unified Artistic Rating The Greatest Artists of the World of the 18th–21st Centuries. In 2016, world sales of the book Encyclopedia Art Parallels were launched. The book covers the 30-year period of Nikolai Sednin's work and is a cultural encyclopedia based on a comparison of artifacts and masterpieces of art from different eras with the works of the master. The electronic version of the virtual museum, created on the basis of the book, is available in 50 countries of the world.

== Dee-Art ==
Dee-Art (Greek dis – twice, art – art) is a post-modern trend in art, founded by Nikolai Sednin in 1994.

In 1993, Nikolay Sednin conducted a creative experiment in which the task was to test the idea that he designated as the effect of a released hand. The works were created blindfolded by brush on paper, and each image was completed within a few seconds. Later, the works were collected in a single cycle, called drawings for meditation.

As a result of the experiment, Nikolay Sednin came up with the idea of a possible purposeful change in consciousness in the process of creativity. The author was interested in the specifics of the appearance of visual images in adults with an uncontrolled psyche, which led to the idea of creating a creative group in a specialized institution. In 1994, Sednin volunteered to organize an art studio called Healing with Art at the psychoneurological boarding school No. 20 of Moscow. In the process of training, he created the basic principles and practical method of the program for the rehabilitation of the psyche.

The result of his creative activity was the opening in 1999 of the Gallery, which most fully represents the works of painting and graphics from those created in the studio Healing by Art. In 2000, thanks to the constant updating of the collection of works, the studio received wide publicity in the media and attracted the attention of the Russian Association of Art Critics. Since the author’s methodology and style of the works was recognized as individual and non-standard, there was a need for definition for the artistic direction. So the term Dee-Art appeared.

In 2001, under the patronage of the Association of Art Critics, the album Dee-Art – Art of the 21st Century was released. The results of the program were presented in 2002 in the State Duma of the Russian Federation, where an exhibition of the artist and his students was held.

== Sednin N.N. House Museum ==
In 2018, the Moscow Region non-governmental cultural institution SEDNIN NIKOLAY NIKOLAYEVICH'S HOUSE-MUSEUM was created. The Nikolai Sednin Museum presents a collection of exhibits and events: exhibitions – original works of painting, graphics and sculpture in a constantly updated exposition; presentations – the opening of new expositions of works of art; Awarding at the Museum of laureates and diploma winners of the international competition Art. Excellence. Awards; Concert performances of famous Russian singers, poets and composers; Master classes and demonstration lessons in drawing, painting and composition from famous Russian artists; performances and lectures at the Museum of famous Russian art critics. The museum conducts regular excursions for all age categories.

== Gallery ==
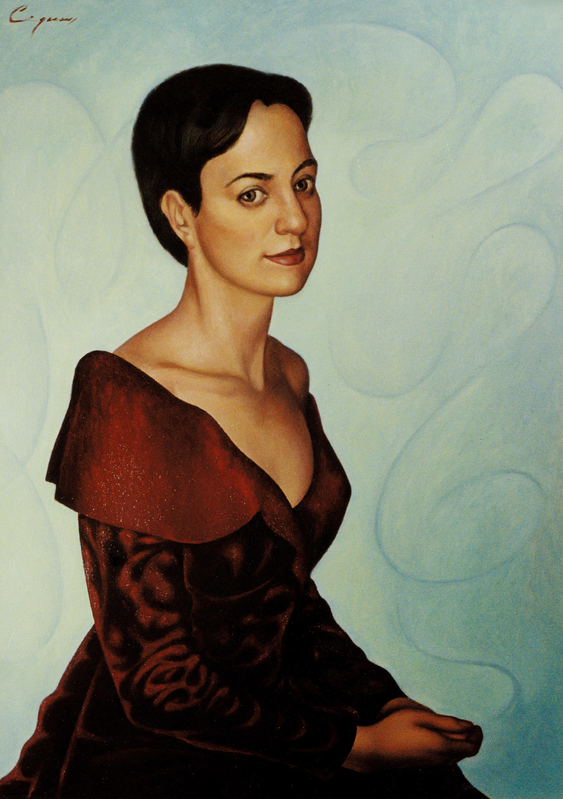
«Varvara». 2000, 80×60.

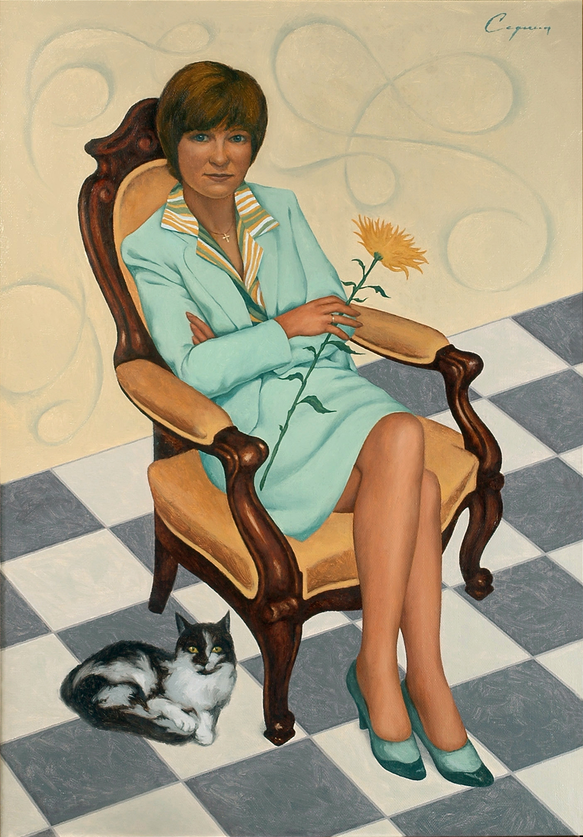
«Lady with chrysanthemum» 2006, 100×70.

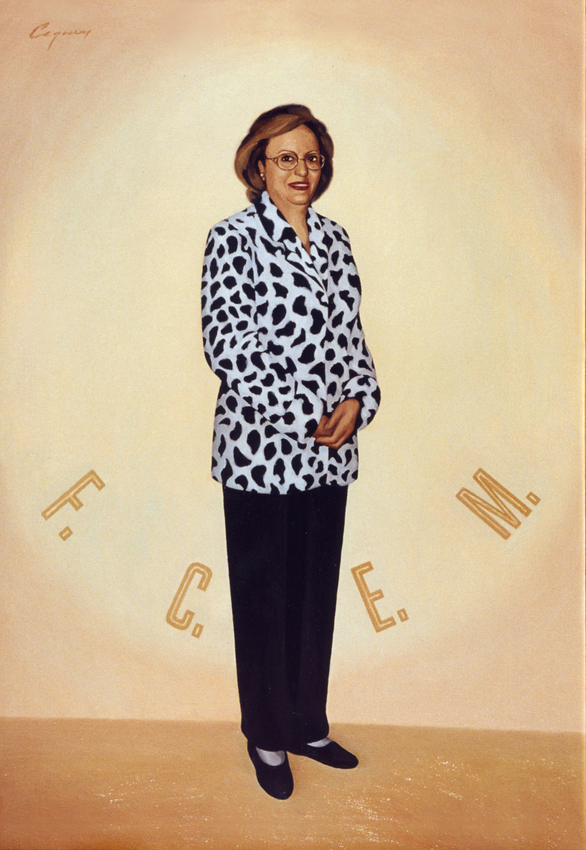
«Mrs. Leila Hayat» 2002, 100×70.

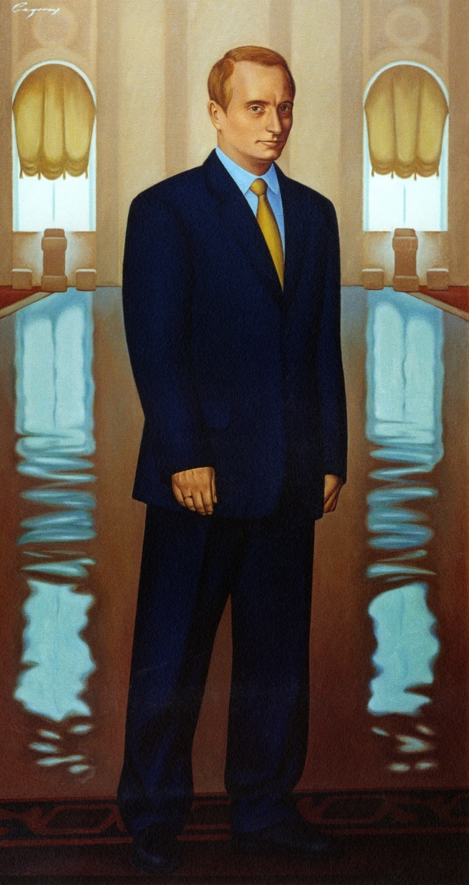
«Russian President in the Kremlin Putin». 2000, 150×80.

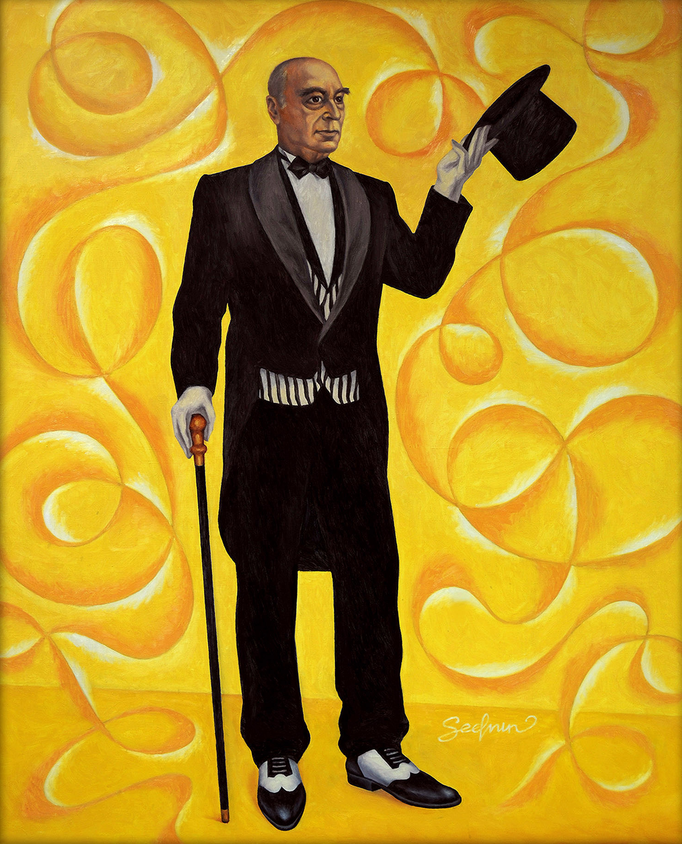
«Portrait Of Vladimir Etush». 2012, 120×100.

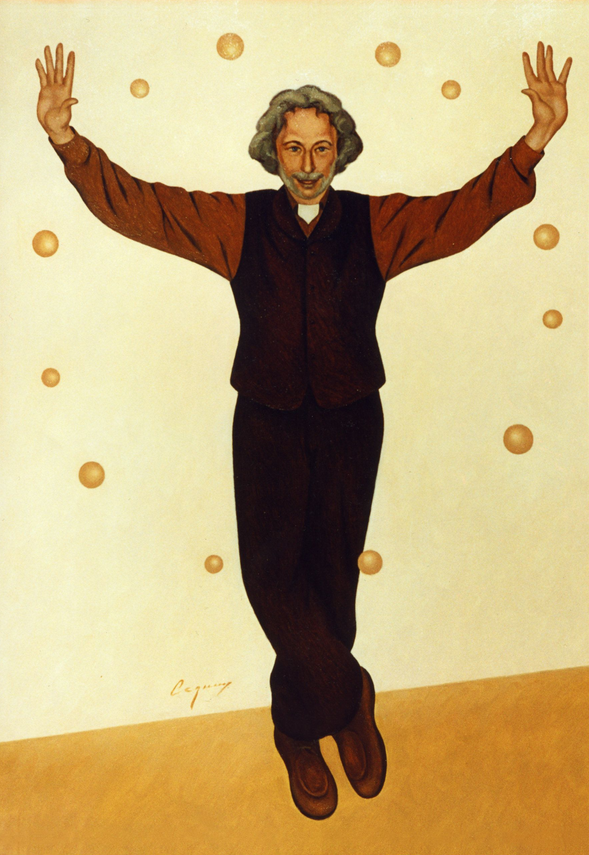
«The Magic Of Pierre Richard». 2001, 100×70.

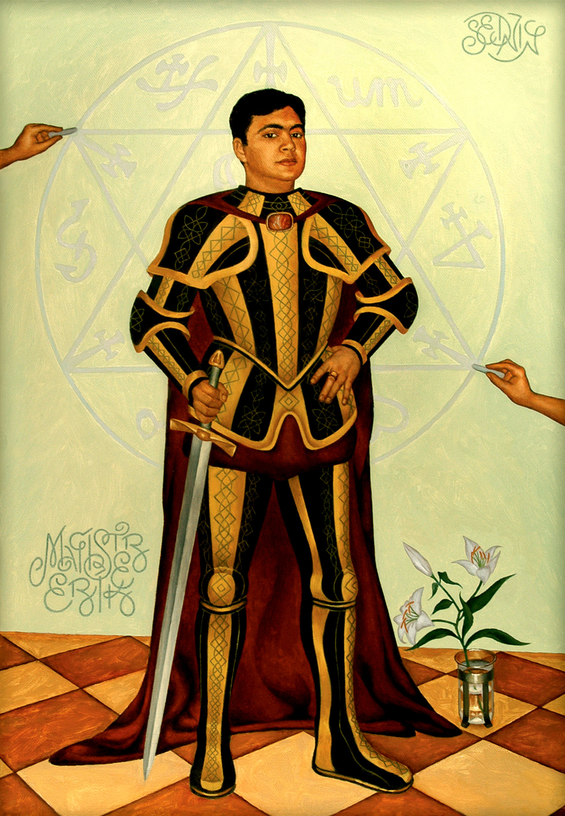
«Magister Erik». 2006, 100×70.

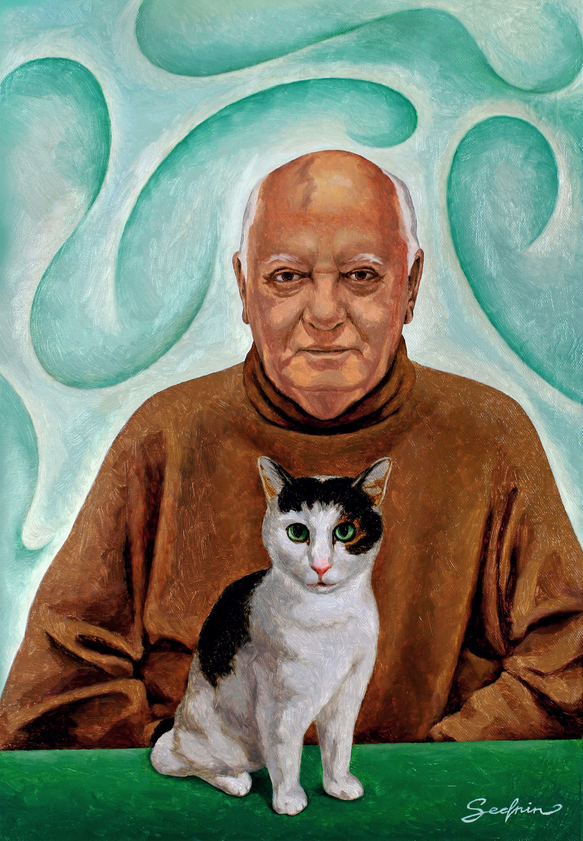
«Mikhail Gorbachev and cat Willy». 2018, 100×70.

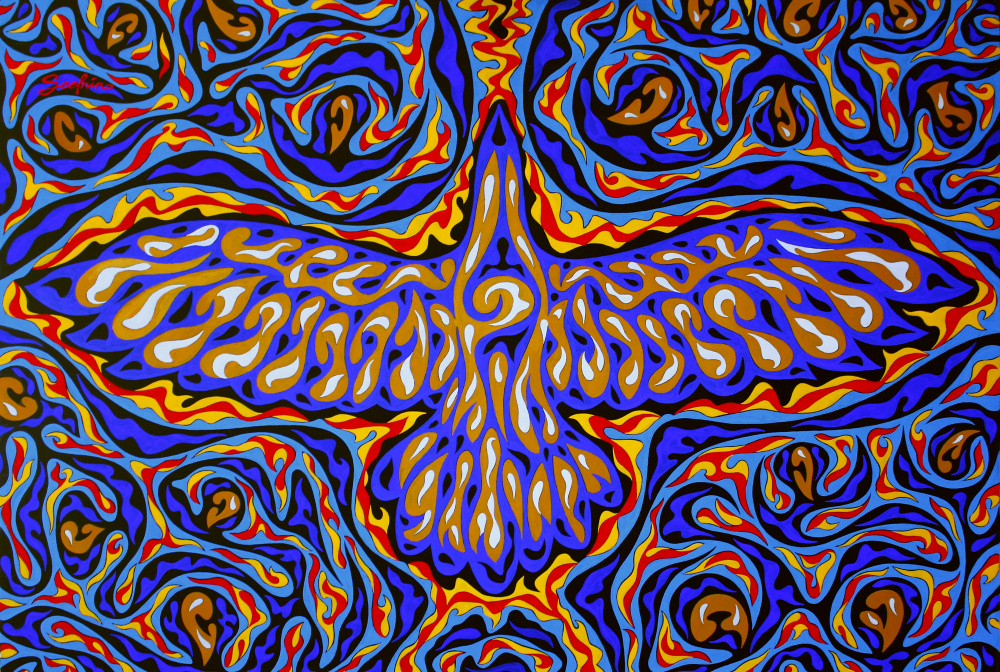
«Fenix». 2018, 100×140.

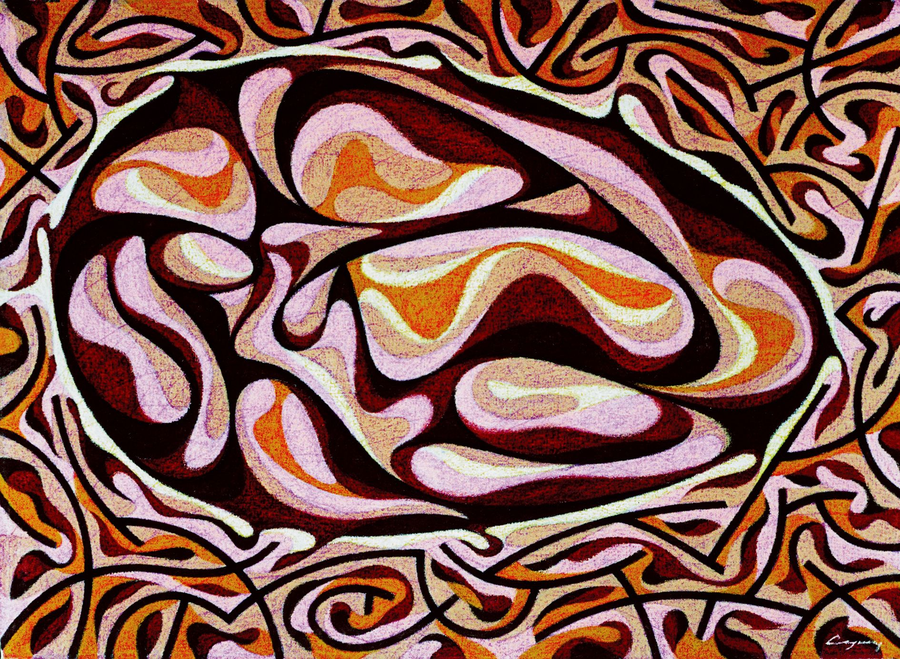
«Creation». 1999, 70×100.

== Literary work ==
Books of Nikolay Sednin were awarded literary prizes of the Union of Writers of Russia: a gold medal and the Literary Olympus Prize, a medal of A. S. Pushkin, the Literary Prize «For Fidelity to Word and Work", the Order of «M. Y. Lermontov ”, with the awards of the Union of Writers of Battle of Russia: the medal «Generalissimus A. V. Suvorov” and the medal «General M. D. Skobelev”. In 2019, Nikolai Sednin was awarded the highest public title «People's Writer of Russia”.

Books and Encyclopedias:

«Drawings from Words” (Poetic collection). 1996 «The Gospel of the Artist" (Collection of copyright quotes). 2005 «Elitarch" (Encyclopedia of Architecture). 2011–2013 «Art Parallels" (Encyclopedia of artifacts). 2013–2016 «BDSM as an Art" (Theater of Secret Desires). 2015 «Recipes of restaurateur Zhory" (Encyclopedia of Culinary). 2016 «The Great Ocean Way" (Pages from diaries). 2017 «Drawings from events" (Stories about life in art) 2019

== Awards ==
- Awarded the gold medal of the Professional Union of Artists of Russia for the series «Portrait heliography.» Moscow, Russia (2018);
- Awarded the gold medal GOLD MEDAL OF EXCELLENCE of the international photography competition «Trierenberg Super Circuit», Austria (2012);
- Awarded a gold medal in the nomination Fine Art / Nudes – Professional. Photo Contest «PX3 PRIX DE LA PHOTOGRAPHIE PARIS», Paris, France (2011);
- Awarded the honorary INTERNATIONAL PHOTOSHOW «BLACK AND WHITE SPIDER AWARDS» Prize, Los Angeles, United States (2011);
- Laureate of the international competition «Black-and-White Nude», «Photo Competition.ru», Moscow, Russia (2010);
