= Yuri Salko =

Ukrainian visual artist

Salko Yury
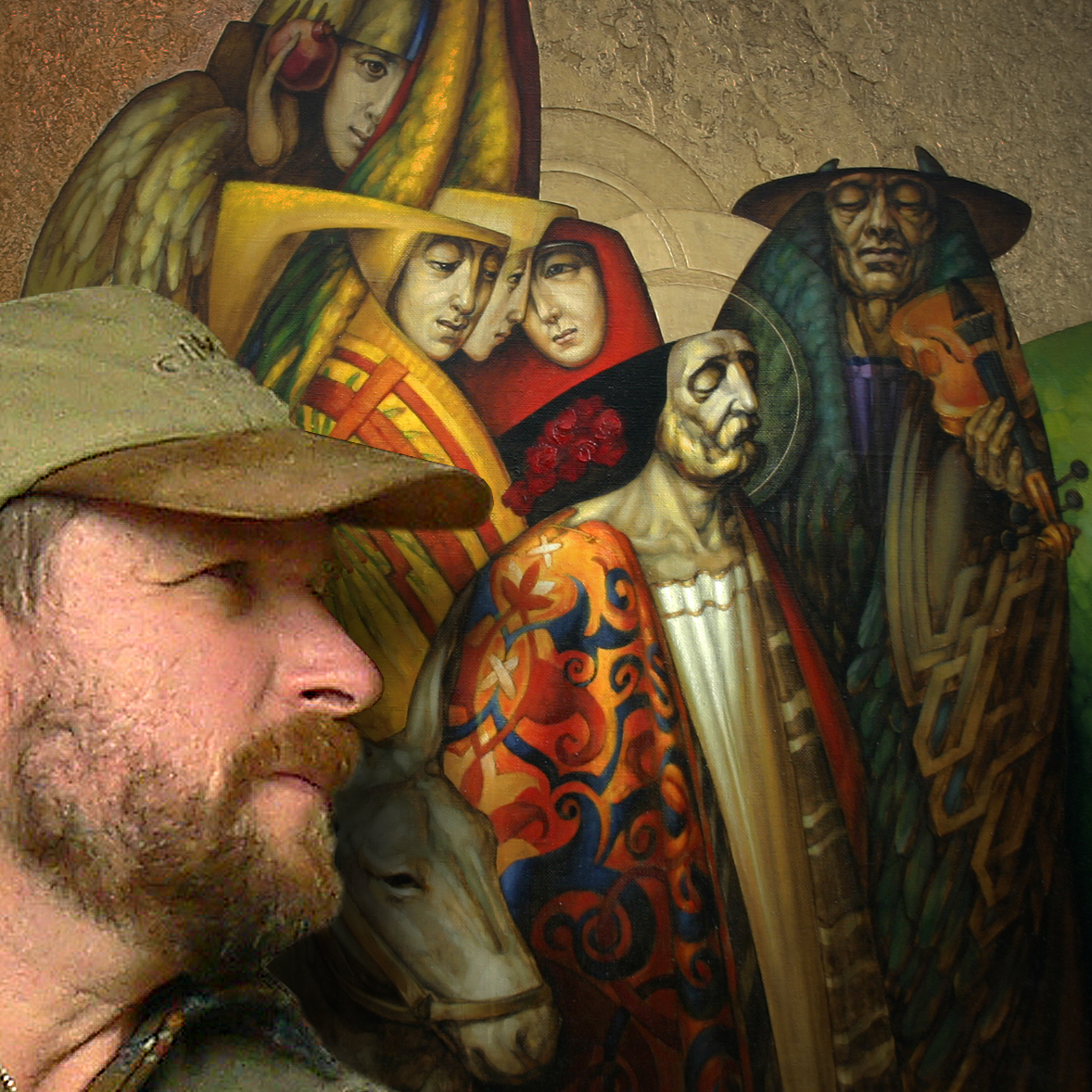
- Born: 20 April 1964; Kryvyi Rih, Ukraine
- Known for: Painting, Graphics, and Sculpture
- Style: Expressive and romantic symbolism

Yuri Salko (Russian: Ю́рий Ива́нович Салко́, born 1964) is a Ukrainian visual artist. He graduated from the Grekov Art College, Odesa, Ukraine in 1984 and Shevchenko Transnistria State University, Tiraspol, Transnistria in 1999.

He works in different areas of fine arts such as (painting, graphics, sculpture).

Yuri Salko is a member International Academy of Modern Art, Rome, Italy; Peter's Academy of Arts and Sciences, St. Petersburg, Russia; International Association "Union of Designers of Transnistria"; International Association of Culture and Art; The National Union of Artists of Moldova; The National Union of Artists of Ukraine, the author and co-organizer of the International Project artists «Kam Art».

According to the artist's works were issued stamps with the flora and fauna of Transnistria.

== Exhibitions selectively ==
- 2007-2010: Residence "Excel Roma Montemario", Rome, Italy;
- 2011: Federation for Peace and Conciliation, Moscow, Russia;
- 2012: Museum of Jewish Culture, Szydłów, Poland;
- 2013: Ministry of Foreign Affairs, Tiraspol, Moldova; Gallery of the European Commission, Brussels, Belgium;
- 2014: Art-gallery "Victory Gardens", Odesa, Ukraine; International charitable Senior Services Art Show and Elberson Fine Arts Center, Winston-Salem, North Carolina, United States; Rotterdam International Art Fair, medieval "De Laurenskerk", Netherlands;
- 2015: Art Revolution Taipei, World Trade Center, Taipei, Taiwan;

Participated in more than 200 exhibitions and symposiums.

== Art awards ==
- 2000: Crystal sphere «POAART for peace», Slovenia;
- 2007: Silver Medal, Medusa Aurea Trophy, Rome, Italy^{,};
- 2008: Full Member of Academic Senate, International Academy of Modern Art, Rome, Italy;
- 2008: Honored Worker of Arts, Kyiv, Ukraine;
- 2009: Gold Medal, Intern. Art Competition NAFA, Pocos de Caldas, Brasília, Brazil;
- 2009: Honour Member, National Academy of Fine Arts, Brasilia;
- 2011: Merit Award, Palm Art Award, Art Domain Group, Leipzig, Germany;
- 2011: Full Member, Peter's Academy of Arts and Sciences, Saint Petersburg, Russia;
- 2014: State honorary title "People's Artist of Transdniestria", Moldova; Whois Publisher Priсe, Palm Art Award, Art Domain Group, Quedlinburg, Germany;
- 2015: Medal Intercession of the Theotokos, Diocese, Moldova; Award, Art Revolution Taipei International Competition, Taiwan International Contemporary Artist Association, Taiwan.

== Artworks in public collections ==
- Lviv National Museum, Ukraine;
- Kyiv-Mohyla Academy, Kyiv, Ukraine;
- Historical Museum, Lviv, Ukraine;
- History and Art Museum, Bacău, Romania;
- Memorial Museum of Dostoevsky, Saint Petersburg, Russia;
- International Academy of Modern Art, Rome, Italy;
- Affendi Museum, Yogyakarta, Indonesia;
- State Art Museum of Transnistria, Bender, Moldova;
- Senior Services Inc. of Winston-Salem and Forsyth County, United States

== Selectively Projects ==
- 2006-2015 KAM ART - "Spirit of art" - International Project, includes artists symposiums: «Kam Art» in Transnistria (MD) and "In the name of Saint Andrei Rublev" in Russia and Abkhazia. This is Plein Air with health recovery symposium participants in the popular resort, scientific and artistic conferences, workshops, pilgrimages to monasteries and churches, art exhibitions in museums and galleries, charitable activities for schools and orphanages.
