= Oksana Mas =

Ukrainian artist

- Oksana Mas is posing with her artwork from "Heart Transplant" series
- Born: 1969 (age 56–57); Chornomorsk, Ukraine
- Education: Chornomorsk School of Fine Arts, Grekov Odesa Art School
- Known for: Installation art, Painting, Video art
- Notable work: Altarpiece of nations, "Look into Eternity"

Oksana Mas is a Ukrainian contemporary artist and the organizer of "ArtTogether", a global interactive art project aimed at visualizing the new cultural code of the modern generation and uniting people at a time of political and social turmoil.

Working with a variety of mediums, Oksana employs painting and graphic art techniques, creates sculptures, installations and large-scale photo works and partakes in urban construction and space design workshops across Europe.

== Biography ==
Born in 1969 in Ukraine, Oksana graduated from the Mitrofan Grekov Odesa State Art School in 1992. In the 1990s, she played a part in the decade's painting revival and later investigating relational art and scientific art practices. Already an established artist, in 2003 she earned a Bachelor of Philosophy from Odesa University. Oksana is working on a PhD on problems of art in the social media.

Highlights of Oksana's work include the POST-VS-PROTO-RENAISSANCE project (a prototype of the "ArtTogether" installation) presented at the 54th Venice Biennale in 2011 which became one of the most attended and widely covered pavilions of the Biennale. In 2013 the artist participated in the Collateral Events program of the 55th Venice Biennale with the "Quantum Prayer" project in the "Glasstress 2013" group exhibition . In 2012, Oksana won the Independent Critics Prize at the 65th Locarno International Film Festival.

Oksana's art has been shown at multiple exhibitions worldwide, including the "Women and Art" Biennial at the Sharjah Art Museum in 2014, the "Modus R. Russian Formalism Today" (part of the Art Basel Miami non-commercial program, 2006); the "MAS" exhibit at the Moscow Museum of Modern Art in 2008, as well as in FRIEZE (London), ARCO (Madrid), Fiac (Paris), The Armory Show (New York), Vienna Fair, Art Dubai and Art Karlsruhe.

Works by Oksana have been sold at the Sotheby's, Christie’s and Phillips auction houses. Her art-works can be found in museum and private collections in France, the United States, Great Britain, Italy, Switzerland, Japan, Ukraine, Arab Emirates, Russia and Australia.

Actor Kevin Spacey selected Oksana's work "Mandala Dance", together with pieces by Tracey Emin, Banksy, Jake and Dinos Chapman, Michael Craig-Martin for a charity auction, "Illuminating the Future", held by Christie's on February 10, 2014 to support the legendary Old Vic Theater. The ruling Prince of Monaco Albert II chose Oksana’s "Spheres of Good" installations to decorate Avenue Henri Dunant in the center of Monte-Carlo.

Oksana gives lectures on contemporary art at leading universities in the United States, the UK (Cambridge) and Germany. She is also a frequent guest speaker on history of art and philosophy.

Oksana currently lives and works in Spain, Poland and Ukraine.

== Work philosophy ==
In her art works, Oksana elaborates an aesthetic perception of a human being in times of drastic social and geo-political change that are irrespective of the era or geographical placement. Oksana cites that her academic studies in such fields as science, the philosophy of digital technologies, the history of religions and art history along with her own multiculturalism have created the foundation of her artistic identity and enabled her to create versatile artworks, immune to trends. Her work is a visual exploration of the search for this generation's cultural code with the intention to facilitate a creative dialogue between different religions and social groups. The artist manages to combine vivid non-literal figurativeness based on eternal values in visually and formally distinct works lending themselves to a perviousness of interpretations, The symbolic images in her paintings are consistently ambiguous. Multi-layered meanings intertwined in every artwork attempt to immerse the audience in a discovery process exploring ideas and images found in both European and Eastern cultures.

== Works ==
=== ArtTogether ===
Post-vs-Proto-Renaissance - 1st stage of ArtTogether project This art installation became the first stage in ArtTogether project. It was presented under the title of "Altarpiece of Nations" (22 m. in height by 38 m. in width) at the Sophia Square in Kyiv and as part of the main program of the 54th Venice Biennale in 2011. The installation represented fragments of the Ghent Altarpiece by the 15th-century Flemish artists, the Van Eyck brothers. Each of them was assembled from hand-painted wooden eggs, referencing the Ukrainian folk pysankas". As the famous art historian, curator and critic Achille Bonito Oliva, who was curating the exhibition Post-vs-Proto-Renaissance at the 54th Venice biennale, put it: "In the art-works of the last years Oksana Mas has switched the optics from timeless, metaphysical perception of sculpture towards collisions between the path of history and subjective time, doing so through the transformation of individual creativity into a collective one. This is the way of true spiritual democracy. Art as an emancipation of personal "self" and of general "us"."

ArtTogether stages At the current 2nd stage of the project people from all over the world contribute via Internet platform ArtTogether.com their drawings to allow them to become part of a new cultural code of a generation. They manifest their vision of and aspirations for an ideal world. New parts of installation are created using digital technologies on plastic eggs. No curator is supervising co-creators. To date, 380.000 people from 42 countries have taken part in the project. At the 3rd stage scheduled for 2017-2019 the global community will complete the project, creating 3.640.000 drawings via Internet platform and the entire installation will be demonstrated on all continents.

=== Paintings ===
Biomorphic Realism As with the series They Are Among Us, in Biomorphic Realism the artist continues to look at random objects, strangers on the street, fleeting signs of a higher existence that cannot be captured by a glimpse or a name. The artist’s technique of applying dozens of interlacing layers of paint and lacquer gives the canvas surfaces a glassy glossiness, underlining the fluidity of the shapes of art and of life.

Red Expression In this series of paintings created in 2012, Mas takes the spectator into her experience of seeing the world in a rhythmic, pulsating dimension. The artist depicts her own environment with the intimacy of a diary: people feeding pigeons in a park, cyclists, a couple having a rest or awaiting for someone. Mas combines the spontaneity of an instant with a timeless validity that can never be obliterated.

=== Sculptures, Installations and Video ===
Phenomenon of Epidermism Created in 2006, this series of sculptures is made out of brand new wheels and tires covered with latex, giving the appearance of human bodies turned into formless esh. The biomass of body fragments is perceived as a suggestion of car-wrecked humanity. Mas’ installation challenges conventional attitudes towards life, referencing pervasive fears and self-destruction. With the premonitory video Phenomenon of Epidermism, Mas won the Independent Critics Prize at the prestigious Locarno Film Festival in 2012.

Helium-3 This series of objects (created in 2010) made of metal and plastic and assembled in a high-scale spatial installation engages with the theme of the duality and ambiguity of any phenomenon. Helium-3, which is considered a potential fuel of the future, is an extremely rare substance on Earth, unlike the Moon where it is abundant. The work uses it to symbolize the hopes and fears of humanity.

=== Photo ===
Quantum Prayer Oksana’s Quantum Prayer was a title piece at the Glasstress 2013 exhibition, a collateral event of the 55th Biennale di Venezia. The Glasstress organizers inspire modern artists to create works of art in collaboration with the best Murano glass blowers. Oksana combined several personally important topics in this project – an interest in science and motor vehicles, alongside a study of the tremendous potential of freedom and unity to be found in art. Under her supervision, the Murano maestro covered car engines with liquid glass. The high temperature of the glass melted the metal, just as the power of thought changes the world.

== Mas Studio ==
In 2012 Oksana established the Mas Studio, where she oversees the creation of artistic concepts for jewelry, architecture, urban space design and photography. Mas Studio has offices in London, Zurich and New York.
