= Iosif Shkolnik =

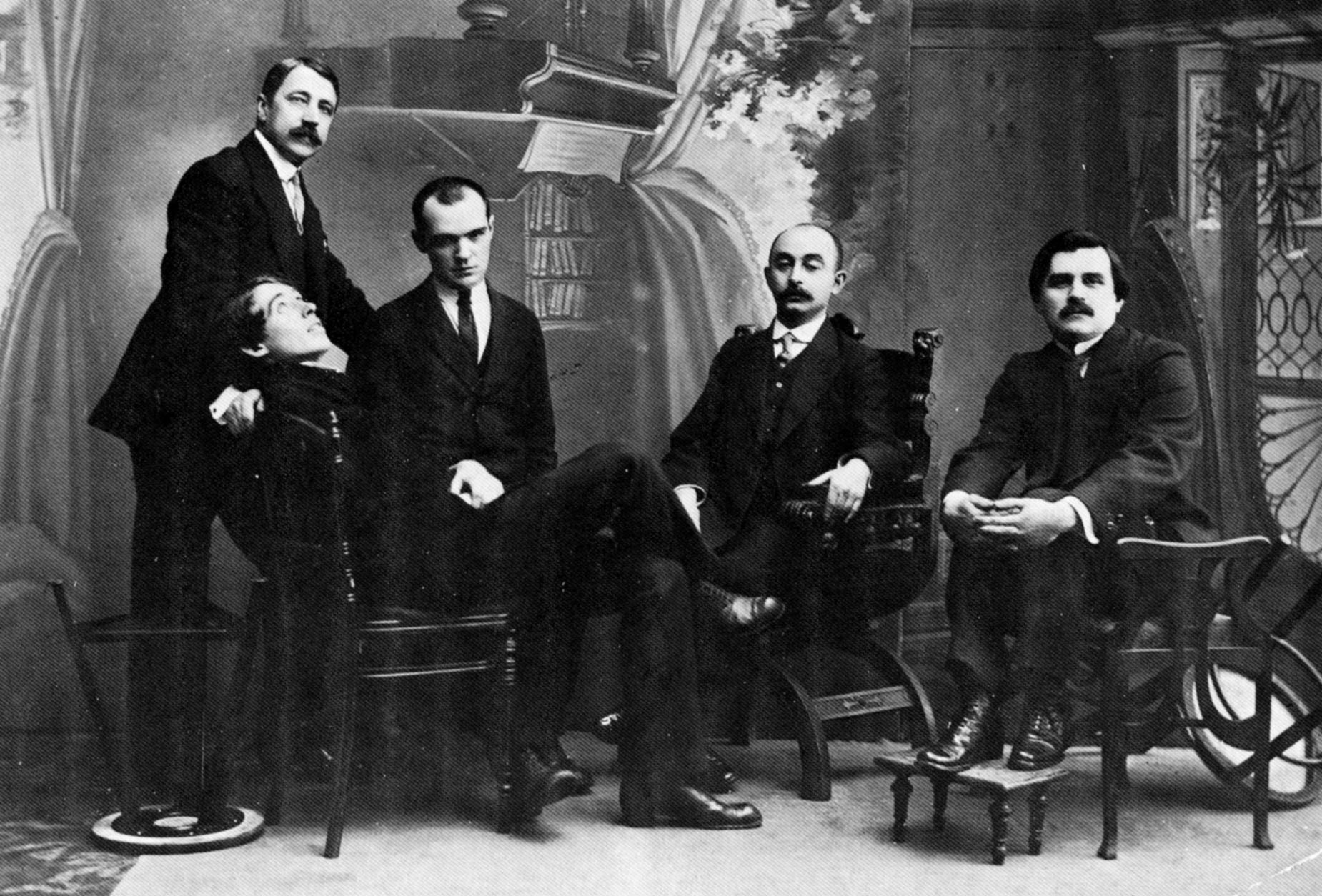
Mikhail Matyushin, Aleksei Kruchenykh, Pavel Filonov, Shkolnik, Kazimir Malevich, 1913 (photograph by Karl Bulla)

Iosif Solomonovič Shkolnik (30 November 1883 in Balta – 26 August 1926 in Leningrad) was a painter and set designer from the Russian Empire and later the Soviet Union.

He studied at the Grekov Odessa Art school.

In 1908 he exhibited in the New Trends in Art exhibition.

He was one of the co-founders of Soyuz Molodyozhi (Union of Youth). He worked with Pavel Filonov on the design of the set for Vladimir Mayakovsky: A Tragedy, a play staged by the futurists on 2 December 1913.

== Gallery ==
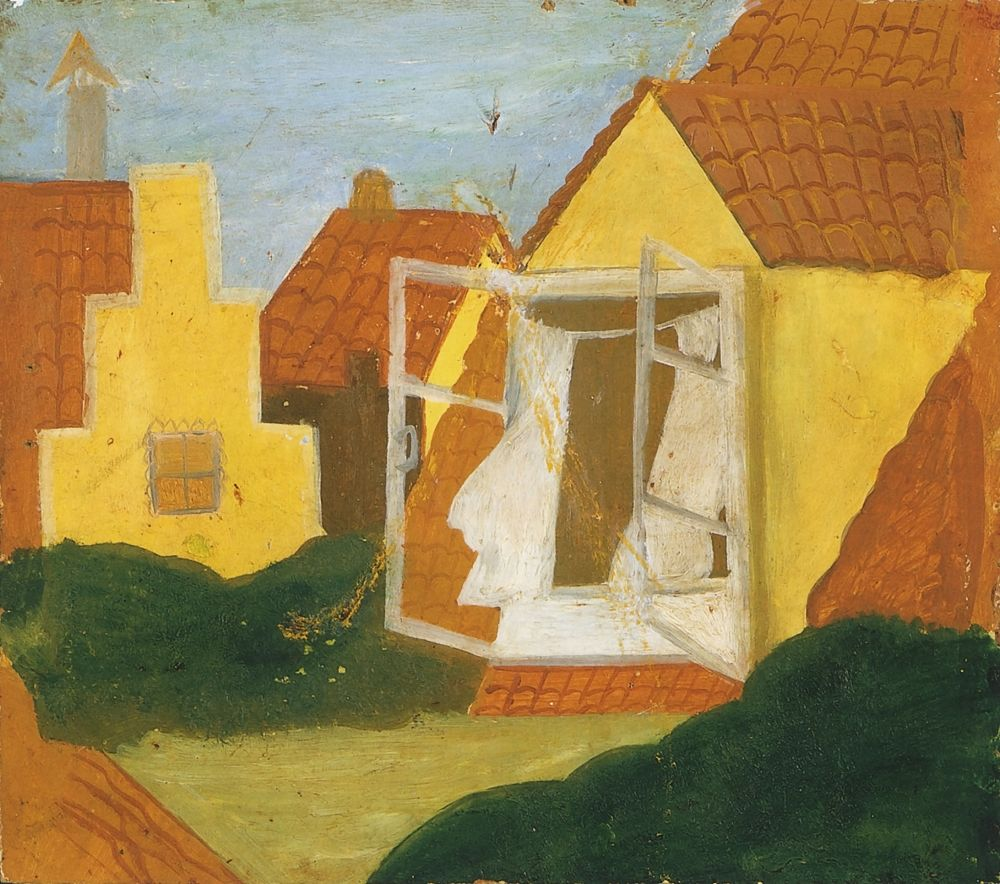

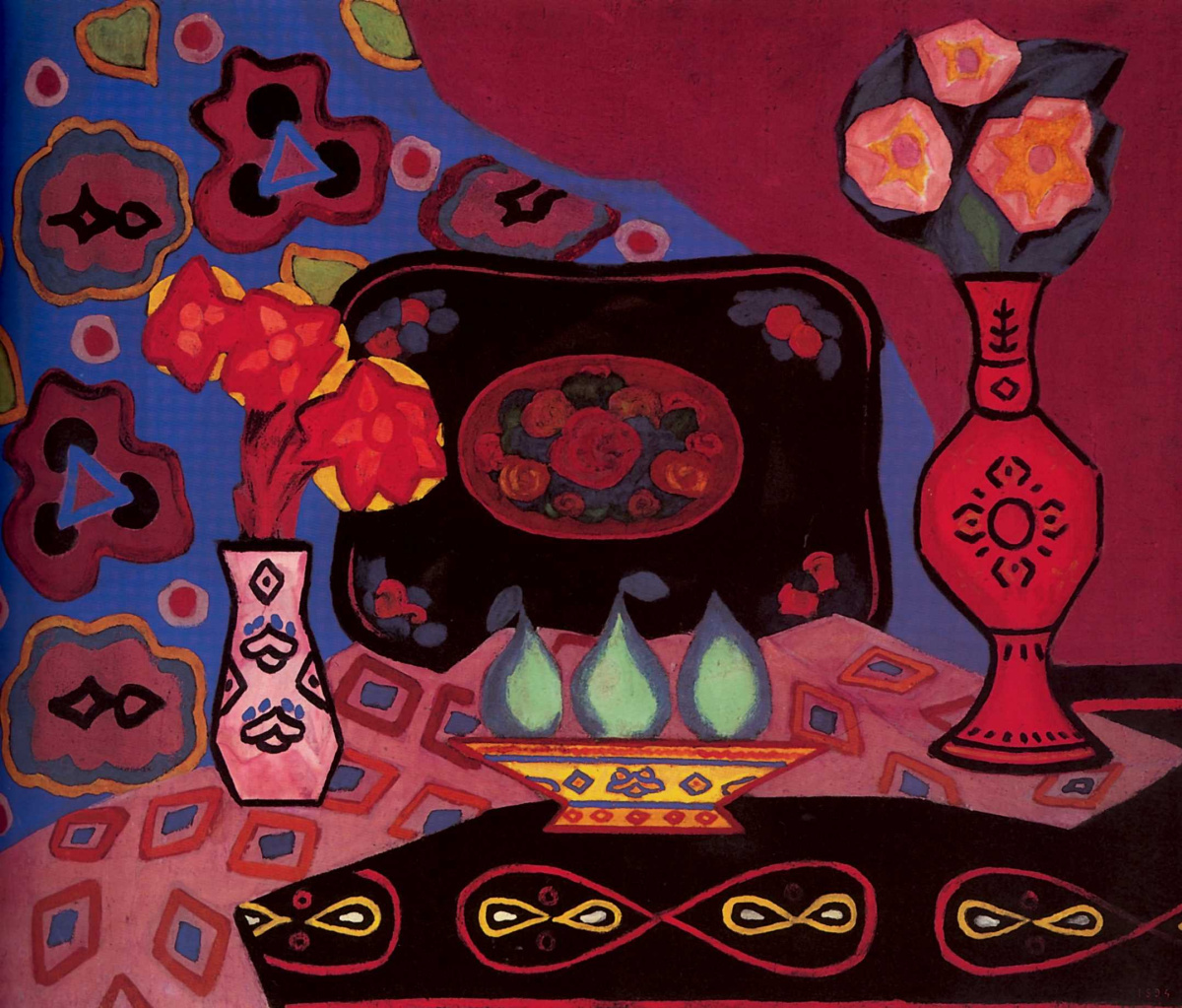

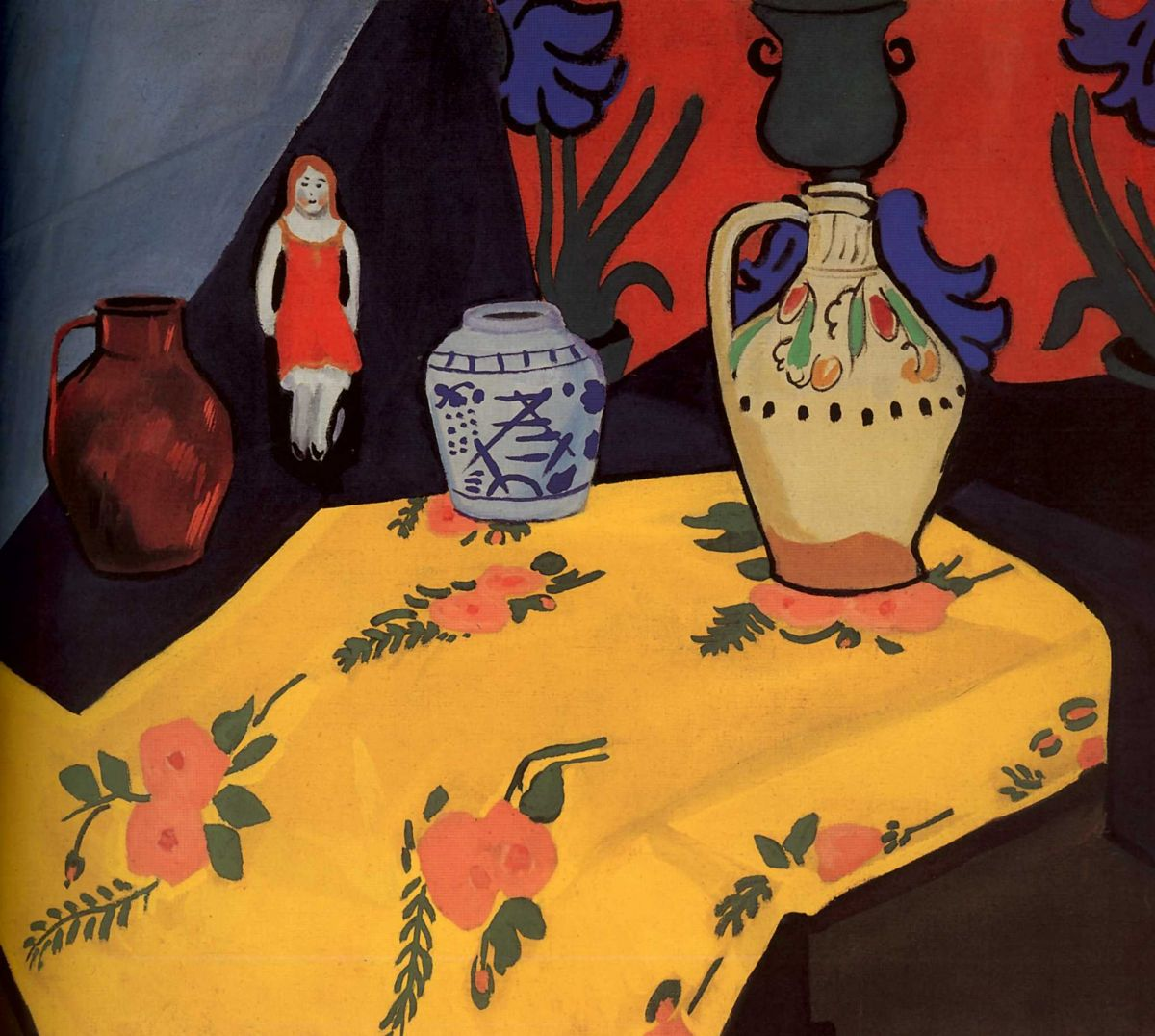

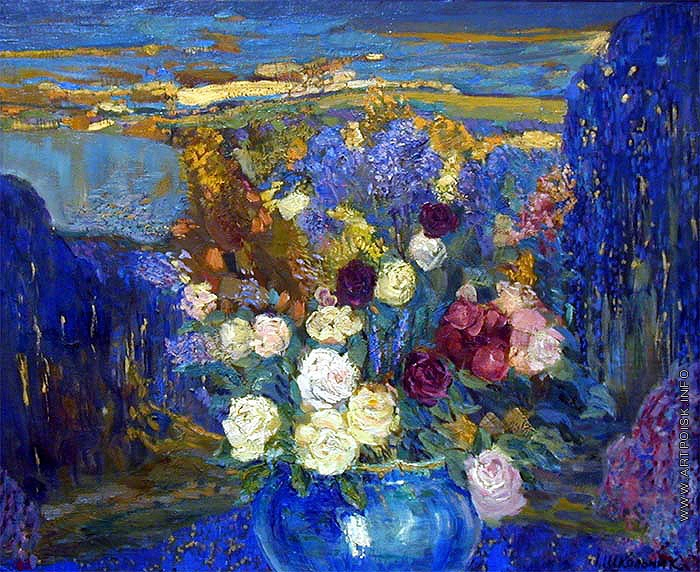
