= Samson Flexor =

French-Brazilian abstract artist

Samson Flexor (born Samson Modestovich Flexor; 9 September 1907, in Soroca, Bessarabia, Imperial Russia – 31 July 1971, in São Paulo, Brazil) was a French and Brazilian artist, and founder of the Brazilian abstract art.

== Period of apprenticeship ==
Samson Flexor was born in Soroca in a wealthy Jewish family. His father, Modest Flexor, the son of merchant agricultural colony in Zguritsa (now Soroca District of Moldova) was known throughout the province as an agronomist, a landowner and one of the richest men. His mother Marie-Georgette (née Kleiner) was born in France. Samson was educated at a private school in Soroca, then in the Odessa Art School and school in Bucharest, where she moved the whole family. In 1922-1924 he studied at the Belgian Royal Academy of Fine Arts (Academie Royale des Beaux-Arts) in Brussels, and since 1924 in the Paris National School of Fine Arts (École Nationale des Beaux-Arts) Lucien Simon (Lucien Simon, 1861-1945), and also attended lectures on art history at the Sorbonne University. In 1926 he studied fresco technique in private Academie Ranson. In the late 1920s, his parents also settled in Paris, and in 1929 the family received French citizenship.

== Paris period and conversion to Roman Catholicism ==
Flexor began to paint with Sorokskaya landscapes, to the 1920s, almost entirely focused on portretistike, first performed in a realistic manner. Over the years, portrait work appear more pronounced expressionist features. The first solo exhibition of works by Flexor held 22 April 1927 in Brussels in the gallery Campagne Premiere, followed by a part in group exhibitions in Paris, during the 1930s, he regularly exhibited at the Salon des Surindépendants. In 1933 his wife died in Flexor's childbirth Tatiana Yablokov. This tragedy led to a creative and existential crisis: in the same year Flexor adopted Roman Catholicism and some time to painting. When he began to paint again, his works have appeared distinctly religious motives. The relationship of the artist with his family at this time dramatically cooled and financial situation deteriorated. In 1939 he married again with Magda Mezhicher, and in the same year his first son was born and he restored relations with the family. In the next year his father bought for him a house in Normandy, where, after a brief participation in the French Resistance movement, the artist has retired with his family and spent the entire World War II years.

== Brazilian period ==
After the war Flexor did not remain in France. In 1946 he first visited Brazil, and in the spring of 1948 he left France for good and settled in São Paulo. Since moving to Brazil realism completely disappeared from the works of the artist, and all his further work was abstract. In 1951 Flexor opened the first abstractionist studio in Brazil called Atelier-Abstração, where the exhibited works are united around him a group of Brazilian contemporary abstract painters Jacques Douchez, Norberto Nicola, Leopoldo Raimo, Alberto Teixeira, Wega Nery, p. 1912), Anésia Pacheco e Chaves, Charlotta Adlerová, Ernestina Karman, Iracema Arditi and Gisela Eichbaum. In 1961 Flexor opened the second abstractionist studio. The only exception to the whole abstractionist art in Brazil during the frescoes were made by him in 1948 for the church of Nossa Senhora de Fátima and in 1958-1960 for the Church of Nossa Senhora do Perpétuo Socorro in São Paulo. In the last years of his life and during the 1970s the work of Samson Flexor regularly exhibited in Brazil in recent years has increased interest in his work and abroad. A comprehensive exhibition of one hundred paintings by the artist to the centennial of his birth, "One Hundred Years / one hundred works" ( 100 de ani/100 de opere ) was held from 11 to 28 September 2007 at his home in the National Art Museum of Moldova in Chișinău, where in October moved in Bucharest and beyond - repeating the career of the artist - in Brussels, London, Paris, Rio de Janeiro and other cities in Brazil - Belo Horizonte, Salvador, Poços de Caldas and São Paulo.
