= Lev Meshberg =

Soviet and American painter (1933–2007)

- Born: August 24, 1933; Odesa, Odesa Oblast, Ukraine
- Died: July 17, 2007 (aged 74); Carrara, Tuscany, Italy
- Education: Grekov Odessa Art School
- Known for: Painting
- Movement: Modernism

Lev Meshberg (August 24, 1933, Odesa, Ukraine – July 17, 2007, Carrara, Italy) was a Soviet-American painter. Meshberg's paintings are autobiographical, filled with enigmatic personal symbols. A figurative painter, his paintings are a combination of discernible objects and ethereal renderings of other objects with dream-like light and color. He built up pigments and other materials to add a sculptural dimension and depth to his paintings. The subtlety of color, originality of composition, and uniqueness of his three-dimensional method of painting brought Meshberg world-wide attention. His works were widely exhibited and purchased by numerous museums and private collectors all over the world.

== Early life ==
Lev Meshberg was born in Odesa, Ukrainian SSR, on April 15, 1933. He started painting and drawing in his early childhood. In 1946 he received First Prize in the Ukrainian Annual Art Contest.In 1950 he began studying painting and drawing at Odessa College of Fine Art. At graduation in 1958 he received the school's highest honors.

== Career ==
In 1960 he was accepted as a full member of the Union of Soviet Artists. In the Soviet Union, Meshberg participated in more than forty solo and group exhibitions, winning prizes at two All-Union Art Exhibitions for Best Painting (1965, 1967). He was named in 1967 as one of six best painters in Russia. In 1973 he, his wife and their son Andrew emigrated to the US to escape the difficulties of being an "unofficial" artist during a time when the dominant style of socialist realism prevailed in Soviet society.

In the United States, Meshberg was represented first by Eduard Nakhamkin Fine Arts Gallery and then by the Franklin Bowles Galleries in New York and San Francisco. During his lifetime he also taught art privately; his principal students were John Currin, Andrew Meshberg, and Leon Lumelsky.

Meshberg worked in Darien, Connecticut, from the years of 1973 to 2001. In 2001 he moved to Carrara, Italy, where he lived until his death on July 17, 2007.
