= Leonid =

Leonid (Russian: Леонид [lʲɪɐˈnʲit]; Ukrainian: Леонід [leoˈn⁽ʲ⁾id]; Belarusian: Леанід, romanized: Leaníd [lʲɛaˈnʲit]) is a Slavic version of the given name Leonidas. The French version is Leonide.

People with the name include:

== Business ==
- Leonid Boguslavsky (born 1951), Soviet-Canadian entrepreneur
- Leonid Dovladbegyan (born 1985), Russian-Armenian entrepreneur
- Leonid Fedun (born 1956), Russian billionaire
- Leonid Ihorovych Krasnopolskyi (1971–2018), Ukrainian entrepreneur
- Leonid Kozik (1948–2023), Belarusian trade unionist
- Leonid Kryuchkov (born 1979), Ukrainian entrepreneur
- Leonid Lebedev (born 1956), Cypriot-Russian entrepreneur
- Leonid Mikhelson (born 1955), Russian-Israeli billionaire
- Leonid Reiman (or Reyman) (born 1957), Russian businessman and government official, currently Minister of Communications and Information Technologies of the Russian Federation
- Leonid Teyf, Russian-Israeli businessman

== Religion ==
- Leonid Feodorov (1879–1935), a bishop and Exarch for the Russian Catholic Church, and survivor of the Gulag
- Leonid of Georgia (1861–1921), Catholicos-Patriarch of All Georgia
- Leonid Gorbachov, (born 1968), Russian Orthodox Bishop
- Leonid Ieronimovich Turkevich, birth name of Leontius Turkevich (1876–1965), Russian Orthodox clergyman

== Academia ==
- Leonid Abalkin (1930–2011), Russian economist
- Leonid Burlachuk (1947–2022), Ukrainian psychologist
- Leonid Grinin (born 1958), Russian philosopher
- Leonid Hurwicz (1917–2008), Russian-born American economist and mathematician who shared the 2007 Nobel Prize in Economics
- Leonid Kamarovsky (1846–1912), Russian law professor
- Leonid Milov (1929–2007), Russian historian
- Leonid Murzin (1930–1996), Soviet linguist
- Leonid Petrov, Russian historian
- Leonid Pitamic (1885–1971), Slovene academic
- Leonid Potapov (ethnographer) 1905-2000), Russian ethnographer
- Leonid Rudnytzky (1935–2024), Ukrainian-American linguist
- Leonid Stolovich (1929–2013), Russian-Estonian philosopher
- Leonid Vasiliev (1891–1966), Soviet parapsychologist
- Leonid Vasilyev (1930–2016), Russian historian and sociologist
- Leonid Zankov (1901–1977), Soviet psychologist

== S.T.E.M. ==
- Leonid Andrussow (1896–1988), Baltic German chemical engineer
- Leonid Assur (1878–1920), Russian engineer
- Leonid Berlyand, Soviet-American mathematician
- Leonid Bodnarchuk (1938–2015), Ukrainian scientist
- Leonid Bunimovich (born 1947), Soviet-American mathematician
- Leonid Voskresensky (1913–1965), Soviet rocket engineer and launch director for Sputnik
- Leonid Dushkin (1910–1990), Soviet rocket engineer
- Leonid Elenin (born 1981), Russian astronomer
- Leonid Frankfurt (born 1941), Russian-Israeli physicist
- Leonid Glazman, Ukrainian-American theoretical physicist
- Leonid Grcev (born 1951), Macedonian electrical engineer
- Leonid Kadeniuk (1951–2018), first and only astronaut of independent Ukraine to fly into outer space
- Leonid Kantorovich (1912–1986) Soviet and Russian mathematician, economist, and only winner from the USSR of the Nobel Prize in Economics
- Leonid Keldysh (1931–2016), Russian physicist
- Leonid Kerber (1903–1993), Soviet radio engineer
- Leonid Khachiyan (1952–2005), Russian-American computer scientist
- Leonid Kraizmer (1912–2002), Soviet cybernetician
- Leonid Kruglyak, American evolutionary geneticist
- Leonid Krushinsky (1911–1994), Soviet biologist
- Leonid Kulik (1883–1942), Russian mineralogist
- Leonid Kupriyanovich (1929–1996), Soviet engineer
- Leonid Lazebnik (born 1941), Russian physician
- Leonid Leibenson (1879–1951), Soviet physicist
- Leonid Levin (born 1948), Soviet-American computer scientist
- Leonid Libkin (born 1965), American computer scientist
- Leonid Mandelstam (1879–1944), Soviet physicist
- Leonid Manevitch (1938–2020), Russian professor, engineer, and mathematician
- Leonid Minin (born 1947), Ukrainian arms trafficker
- Leonid Mirsky (1918–1983), Russian-British mathematician
- Leonid Moroz, Russian-American neuroscientist
- Leonid Pastur (born 1937), Ukrainian physicist
- Leonid Perlovsky, Russian-American computer scientist
- Leonid Peshkin (born 1970), Russian biologist
- Leonid Polterovich (born 1963), Soviet-Israeli mathematician
- Leonid Poretsky (born 1954), Russian-born American endocrinologist
- Leonid Portenko (1896–1972), Soviet ornithologist
- Leonid Radvinsky (1982–2026), Ukrainian-American entrepreneur
- Leonid Ramzin (1887–1948), Russian engineer
- Leonid Rogozov (1934–2000), Russian doctor who performed an appendectomy on himself
- Leonid Roshal (born 1933), Russian pediatrician
- Leonid Rudin, American computer scientist
- Leonid Pavlovich Sabaneyev (1844–1898), Russian zoologist
- Leonid Sazanov, Belarusian-Austrian structural biologist
- Leonid Schneider (born 1977), Ukrainian-German science journalist
- Leonid Sedov (1907–1999), Russian astrophysicist
- Leonid Shafirov (born 1973), Russian entrepreneur
- Leonid Shkadov (1927–2003), Russian aeronautical engineer
- Leonid Shkolnick (born 1945), Ukrainian scientist
- Leonid Shulpin (1905–1942), Russian ornithologist
- Leonid Petrovich Tatarinov (1926–2011), Russian palaentologist and evolutionary biologist
- Leonid A. Umansky (1890–1957), Russian-born American electrical engineer
- Leonid Ustrugov (1877–1938), Russian railway engineer
- Leonid I. Vainerman (born 1946), Ukrainian-French mathematician
- Leonid Vaserstein, Russian-American mathematician
- Leonid Yatsenko (born 1954), Ukrainian physicist
- Leonid Zakharov (born 1947), Russian physicist

== Television and film ==
- Leonid Barats (born 1971), Russian-Ukrainian actor
- Leonid Bronevoy (1928–2017), Soviet actor
- Leonid Bykov (1928–1979), Soviet and Ukrainian actor, film director, and script writer
- Leonid Desyatnikov (born 1955), Soviet and Russian opera and film composer
- Leonid Filatov (1946–2003), Soviet and Russian actor, director, poet, and pamphleteer
- Leonid Gaidai, (1923–1993), Soviet comedy film director
- Leonid Gubanov (1928–2004), Soviet actor
- Leonid Heifetz (1934–2022), Russian stage director
- Leonid Kanevsky (born 1939), Soviet-Israeli actor
- Leonid Kanter (1981–2018), Ukrainian documentary filmmaker
- Leonid Kharitonov (actor) (1930–1987), Soviet actor
- Leonid Kinskey (1903–1998), Russian-American actor
- Leonid Kirensky (1909–1969), Soviet physicist
- Leonid Kizim (1941–2010), Soviet cosmonaut
- Leonid Kmit (1908–1982), Soviet actor
- Leonid Kulagin (born 1940), Russian actor
- Leonid Kuravlyov (1936–2022), Soviet and Russian actor
- Leonid Kvinikhidze (1937–2018), Russian screenwriter
- Leonid Leonidov (1873–1941), Soviet actor and director
- Leonid Lukov (1909–1963), Soviet director and screenwriter
- Leonid Markov (1927–1991), Soviet actor
- Leonid Mashinskiy (born 1963), Russian actor and director
- Leonid Nechayev (1939–2010), Russian film director
- Leonid Obolensky (1902–1991), Soviet actor
- Leonid Osyka (1940–2001), Ukrainian filmmaker
- Leonid Prudovsky, full name of Leon Prudovsky (born 1978), Soviet-Israeli filmmaker
- Leonid Shvartsman (1920–2022), Russian animator
- Leonid Trauberg (1902–1990), Russian director
- Leonid Yakubovich (born 1945), Russian television host
- Leonid Yarmolnik (born 1954), Russian actor and producer
- Leonid Yengibarov (1935–1972), Soviet clown and actor

== Music ==
- Leonid Agutin (born 1968), Russian pop musician and songwriter
- Leonid Chizhik (born 1947), Moldovan jazz pianist
- Leonid Dukhovny (1938–2022), Soviet-American singer-songwriter
- Leonid Gorokhov (born 1967), Russian-born British-German cellist
- Leonid Grin (born 1947), Soviet-born American conductor
- Leonid Hambro (1920–2006), American concert pianist
- Leonid Hrabovsky (born 1935), Ukrainian composer
- Leonid Karev (born 1969), Russian musician
- Leonid Kharitonov (singer) (1933–2017), Soviet and Russian bass-baritone singer
- Leonid Kogan (1924–1982), Soviet and Russian violinist
- Leonid Korchmar (born 1943), Russian conductor
- Leonid Kreutzer (1884–1953), Russian pianist
- Leonid Kuzmin, Belarusian-American pianist
- Leonid Malashkin (1842–1902), Russian composer and conductor
- Leonid Margolin (1957–2026), Russian musician and composer
- Leonid Nikolaev (conductor) (1940–2009), Russian conductor and professor
- Leonid Rezetdinov (born 1961), Russian composer
- Leonid Rudenko (born 1985), Russian DJ
- Leonid Sabaneyev (1881–1963), Russian musicologist
- Leonid Sagalov (1910–1940), Soviet pianist
- Leonid Serebrennikov (born 1947), Russian singer
- Leonid Sigal, Russian violinist and conductor
- Leonid Soybelman (born 1966), Moldovan-German musician
- Leonid Utyosov (Leyzer (Lazar) Vaysbeyn, or Weissbein) (1895–1982), Soviet and Russian jazz singer and comic actor
- Leonid Vainshtein (1945–1994), Azerbaijani composer

== Military & intelligence ==
- Leonid Artamonov (1859–1932), Russian general and explorer
- Leonid Azgaldyan (1942–1992), Armenian physicist and military commander
- Leonid Beda (1920–1976), Soviet commander
- Leonid Belakhov (1907–1975), Soviet military general
- Leonid Georgievich Belousov (1909–1998), Soviet flying ace
- Leonid Butkevich (1918–1985), Soviet military sniper
- Leonid Bykovets (1921–1997), Soviet airman
- Leonid Chigin (1914–1943), Soviet colonel
- Leonid Dembowsky (1838–1908), Russian military general
- Leonid Eitingon, Russified name for Nahum Eitingon (1899–1981), Soviet intelligence officer
- Leonid Erin (born 1951), Belarusian-Russian security official
- Leonid Gobyato (1875–1915), Russian lieutenant-general and designer of the modern, man-portable mortar
- Leonid Golikov (1926–1943), Soviet partisan
- Leonid Ivanov (pilot) (1909–1941), Soviet pilot
- Leonid Ivanov (test pilot) (1950–1980), Soviet pilot
- Leonid N. Kartsev (1922–2013), Russian major general
- Leonid Khrushchev (1917–1943), missing aviator
- Leonid Kolobov (1907–1993), Soviet lieutenant general
- Leonid Kurchevsky (1890–1937), Soviet weaponry designer
- Leonid Kvasnikov (1905–1993), Russian chemical engineer and spy
- Leonid Lesh (1862–1934), Russian general
- Leonid Petrovsky (1897–1941), Soviet lieutenant general
- Leonid Punin (1892–1916), Russian military officer
- Leonid Raikhman (1908–1990), Soviet security officer
- Leonid Petrovich Reshetnikov (born 1947), Russian secret agent
- Leonid Sandalov (1900–1987), Soviet colonel-general
- Leonid Ivanovich Shcherbakov (1936–2021), Soviet-Russian military officer
- Leonid Shebarshin (1935–2012), Soviet KGB spy
- Leonid Smirnov (politician) (1916–2001), Soviet statesman and director of munitions production
- Leonid Sobolev (1844–1913), Russian army general
- Leonid Solarević (1854–1929), Serbian military officer
- Leonid Solodkov (born 1958), Russian naval officer
- Leonid Stupnyckj (1891-1944), Commander and Figure in the Ukrainian People's Republic and the Ukrainian Insurgent Army
- Leonid Velilayev (1916–1971), Crimean Tatar-Soviet soldier

== Politics ==
=== Politicians ===
- Leonid Brezhnev (1906–1982), leader of the USSR from 1964 to 1982
- Leonid Bujor (1955–2021), Moldovan politician
- Leonid Chernovetskyi (born 1951), Ukrainian politician
- Leonid Dashuk (born 1938), Belarusian lawyer and politician
- Leonid Derkach (1939–2022), Ukrainian politician
- Leonid Dzapshba (born 1961), Abkhazian politician
- Leonid Enik (born 1960), Abkhazian politician
- Leonid Filimonov (1935–2022), Russian politician
- Leonid Gorbenko (1939–2010), Russian politician
- Leonid Gornin (born 1972), Russian politician and defense minister
- Leonid Gozman (born 1950), Russian politician
- Leonid Hrach (1948–2025), Ukrainian-Russian politician
- Leonid Ilyichev (politician) (1906–1990), Soviet politician
- Leonid Ivashov (born 1943), Russian government official
- Leonid Klimov (born 1953), Ukrainian banker and politician
- Leonid Komogorov (1927–2020), Soviet diplomat
- Leonid Korotkov (born 1965), Russian politician
- Leonid Kostandov (1915–1984), Soviet politician
- Leonid Kozachenko (born 1955), Ukrainian politician
- Leonid Kozhara (born 1963), Ukrainian politician
- Leonid Krasin (1870–1926), Soviet and Russian engineer and politician
- Leonid Kuchma (born 1938), second President of Ukraine
- Leonid Lakerbaia (born 1947), Prime Minister of Abkhazia
- Leonid Lubennikov (1910–1988), Soviet politician
- Leonid Marinich, Belarusian diplomat
- Leonid Markelov (born 1963), Russian politician and Head of Mari El
- Leonid Melnykov (1906–1981), Soviet politician
- Leonid Moiseyev (born 1948), Russian diplomat
- Leonid Novokhatko (born 1954), Ukrainian politician
- Leonid Pasechnik (born 1970), Head of state of the Luhansk People's Republic
- Leonid Pilunsky (1947–2021), Ukrainian politician
- Leonid Polezhayev (born 1940), Russian politician
- Leonid Potapov (1935–2020), Russian politician
- Leonid Roketsky (born 1942), Russian-Ukrainian statesman
- Leonid Sabsovich, Soviet urban planner
- Leonid Safronov (1938–2025), Russian politician
- Leonid Serhienko (born 1955), Ukrainian politician
- Leonid Sharayev (1935–2021), Soviet-Ukrainian politician
- Leonid Skotnikov (born 1951), Russian judge
- Leonid Slutsky (politician) (born 1968), Russian politician
- Leonid Talmaci (born 1954), Moldovan politician
- Leonid Tibilov (born 1951), President of South Ossetia
- Leonid Tisminetski, birth name of Leonte Tismăneanu (1913–1981), Romanian communist propagandist
- Leonid Vokuyev (born 1948), Russian ombudsman
- Leonid Yachenin (1897–1952), Soviet politician
- Leonid Yakovyshyn (1939–2025), Ukrainian politician and publicist
- Leonid Yemets (born 1979), Ukrainian politician
- Leonid Yurkovskiy (born 1995), Swedish-Russian politician
- Leonid Zamyatin (1922–2019), Soviet ambassador and diplomat
- Leonid Zyuganov (born 1988), Russian politician

=== Dissidents ===
- Leonid Georgievsky (born 1980), Russian activist
- Leonid Kannegisser (1896–1918), Assassin of Moisei Uritsky
- Leonid Martynyuk (born 1978), Russian journalist and opposition activist
- Leonid Nikolaev (1904–1934), Assassin of Sergei Kirov
- Leonid Poleshchuk (1938–1986), Russian counterintelligence officer
- Leonid Razvozzhayev (born 1973), Russian left-wing activist
- Leonid Serebryakov (1890–1937), Soviet politician and Great Purge victim
- Leonid Stark (1889–1937), Soviet revolutionary, diplomat and victim of the Great Purge
- Leonid Veyner (1897–1937), Soviet general and victim of the Great Purge
- Leonid Volkov (born 1980), Russian opposition politician, IT specialist, Alexei Navalny аssociate
- Leonid Zakovsky (1894–1938), Latvian Bolshevik revolutionary and victim of the Great Purge

== Tangible arts and design ==
- Leonid Berman (1896–1972), one of the Berman brothers, Russian painters
- Leonid Brailovsky (1867–1937), Russian architect
- Leonid Chernishyov (1875–1932), Russian architect and Holodomor victim
- Leonid Denysenko (1926–2020), Ukrainian-Australian graphic artist
- Leonid Efros, Russian oil painter and enamelist
- Leonid Khizhinsky (1896–1972), Soviet illustrator
- Leonid Komskyi (born 1964), Ukrainian art collector
- Leonid Lazarev (1937–2021), Russian photojournalist
- Leonid Mezheritski (1930–2007), Soviet and Israeli still-life, portrait and landscape painter
- Leonid Molodozhanyn, birth name of Leo Mol (1915–2009), Ukrainian-Canadian artist
- Leonid Nosyrev (born 1937), Russian children's media creator
- Leonid Papara (1906–1984), Ukrainian painter
- Leonid Pasternak (1862–1945), Russian Impressionist painter
- Leonid Pozen (1849–1921), Russian-Ukrainian artist
- Leonid Šejka (1932–1970), Serbian painter and architect
- Leonid Sherwood (1871–1954), Russian-English sculptor and architect
- Leonid Sokov (1941–2018), Russian sculptor
- Leonid Solomatkin (1837–1883), Russian realist painter
- Leonid Tkachenko (artist) (1927–2020), Russian painter
- Leonid Tskhe (born 1983), Russian contemporary artist
- Leonid Uspensky (1902–1987), Russian painter and historian
- Leonid Vavakin (1932–1919), Russian architect and urban planner
- Leonid Vesnin (1880–1933), Soviet architect
- Leonid Yanush (1897–1978), Russian painter

== Chess people ==
- Leonid Gerzhoy (born 1987), Soviet-born Israeli-Canadian chess player
- Leonid Gofshtein (1953–2015), Soviet-Israeli chess grandmaster
- Leonid Kritz (born 1984), Russian chess grandmaster
- Leonid Kubbel (1891–1942), Russian chess player
- Leonid Maslov (born 1935), Uzbekistani chess player
- Leopold Mitrofanov (1932–1992), Soviet chess player
- Leonid Sawlin (born 1999), German chess player
- Leonid Shamkovich (1923–2005), Soviet chess grandmaster
- Leonid Stein (1934–1973), Soviet chess grandmaster from Ukraine among the top ten players in the 1960s
- Leonid Yarosh (born 1957), Russian chess composer
- Leonid Yudasin (born 1959), Soviet-Israeli chess grandmaster
- Leonid Yurtaev (1959–2011), Kyrgyzstani chess grandmaster

== Performing arts ==
- Leonid Kozlov (born 1947), Russian ballet dancer
- Leonid Lavrovsky (1905–1967), Soviet ballet dancer
- Leonid Fyodorovich Myasin, Russian spelling of Léonide Massine (1896–1979), Russian-French choreographer and ballet dancer
- Leonid Sarafanov (born 1982), Ukrainian ballet dancer
- Leonid Skirko (1939–2012), Ukrainian-born Canadian opera singer
- Leonid Smetannikov (born 1943), Russian baritone opera singer
- Leonid Sobinov (1872–1934), Russian opera singer
- Leonid Yakobson (1904–1975), Russian ballet choreographer
- Leonid Zhdanov (1927–2009), Russian dancer and photographer

== Literature ==
- Leonid Andreyev (1871–1919), Russian playwright and short-story writer who led the Expressionist movement in the national literature
- Leonid Bershidsky (born 1971), Berlin-based Russian journalist
- Leonid Corneanu (1909–1957), Moldovan playwright
- Leonid Derbenyov (1931–1995), Russian poet and lyricist
- Leonid Gubanov (poet) (1946-1983), Soviet poet
- Leonid Hlibov (1827–1893), Ukrainian writer
- Leonid Latynin (born 1938), Russian writer
- Leonid Makhnovets (1919–1993), Ukrainian liturgical historian
- Leonid Martynov (1905–1980), Russian writer
- Leonid Mosendz (1897–1948), Soviet writer and poet
- Leonid Parfyonov (born 1960), Russian journalist
- Leonid Pervomayskiy (1908–1973), Soviet poet
- Leonid Polonsky (1833–1913), Russian journalist and writer
- Leonid Rabichev (1923–2017), Russian-Soviet writer
- Leonid Solovyov (writer) (1906–1962), Russian playwright
- Leonid Topchiy (1913–1974), Soviet writer and journalist
- Leonid Tsypkin (1926–1982), Soviet writer
- Leonid Volodarsky (1950–2023), Russian translator
- Leonid Yandakov (1933–2025), Russian journalist
- Leonid Yuzefovich (born 1947), Russian writer
- Leonid Zorin (1924–2020), Russian playwright
- Leonid Zuborev (born 1943), Belarusian author

== Sportspeople ==
- Leonid Akulinin (born 1993), Ukrainian footballer
- Leonid Arkayev (born 1940), Russian gymnast
- Leonid Baranovskyi (1953–2013), Ukrainian footballer
- Leonid Barkovskyy (born 1940), Soviet long jumper
- Leonid Bartenyev (1933–2021), Soviet sprinter
- Leonid Bazan (born 1985), Bulgarian wrestler
- Leonid Bogdanov (1927–2021), Soviet fencer
- Leonid Boyev (born 1986), Russian footballer
- Leonid Buryak (born 1953), USSR/Ukraine-born Olympic-medal-winning soccer player and coach
- Leonid Cherevko (born 1974), Belarusian discus thrower
- Leonid Chuchunov (born 1974), Russian wrestler
- Leonid Derevyanko, Soviet sprint canoer
- Leonid Dobroskokin (born 1952), Russian swimmer
- Leonid Drachevsky (born 1942), Soviet rower
- Leonid Fyodorov (1928–1993), Soviet ski jumper
- Leonid Geishtor (born 1936), USSR (Belarus)-born Olympic champion Canadian pairs sprint canoer
- Leonid Gerchikov (born 2001), Russian footballer
- Leonid Gissen (1931–2005), Soviet rower
- Leonid Gulov (born 1981), Estonian rower
- Leonid Haidarzhy (born 1959), Ukrainian football manager
- Leonid Husak (born 1987), Ukrainian footballer
- Leonid Ilyichev (swimmer) (born 1948), Soviet freestyle swimmer
- Leonid Ivanov (footballer) (1921–1990), Soviet footballer
- Leonid Ivanov (rower) (1938–2019), Soviet rower
- Leonid Ivanov (runner) (born 1937), Soviet long-distance runner
- Leonid Kamburov (born 1982), Russian skater
- Leonid Kamlochuk (born 1974), Ukrainian canoeist
- Leonid Kaznakov (born 1963), Soviet figure skater
- Leonid Khokhlov (born 1980), Russian swimmer
- Leonid Kiyenko (born 1974), Russian football manager
- Leonid Klimovsky (born 1983), Russian futsal player
- Leonid Kolesnikov (1937–2010), Soviet swimmer
- Leonid Kolumbet (1937–1983), Soviet and Ukrainian Olympic cyclist
- Leonid Koshelev (born 1979), Russian-Uzbekistani footballer
- Leonid Kostylev, Russian boxer
- Leonid Kovel (born 1986), Belarusian football player and coach
- Leonid Krasnov (born 1988), Russian cyclist
- Leonid Krayzelburg, birth name of Lenny Krayzelburg (born 1975), American Olympic gold medalist and swimmer
- Leonid Krupnik (born 1979), Ukrainian-born American-Israeli former soccer player and current soccer coach
- Leonid Krylov (born 1980), Russian paracanoeist
- Leonid Kudayev (1971–2026), Russian footballer
- Leonid Kuchuk (born 1959), Belarusian football manaager
- Leonid Labzov (born 1973), Russian ice hockey player
- Leonid Lazaridi (born 1980), Russian footballer
- Leonid Lobachev (born 1966), Belarusian weightlifter
- Leonid Lytvynenko (born 1949), Soviet decathlete
- Leonid Machitski (born 1983), Russian racing driver
- Leonid Markevich (born 1973), Russian footballer
- Leonid Martuchev (1880–1937), Russian fencer and Great Purge victim
- Leonid Masunov (born 1962), Ukrainian long-distance runner
- Leonid Metalnikov (born 1990), Kazakhstani ice hockey player
- Leonid Kravchuk (1934–2022), Ukrainian politician and first President of Ukraine
- Leonid Mina (born 2004), Greek footballer
- Leonid Mironov (born 1998), Russian footballer
- Leonid Moseyev (born 1952), Soviet and Russian long-distance runner
- Leonid Musin (born 1985), Ukrainian footballer
- Leonid Mykytenko (1944–2019), Ukrainian long-distance runner
- Leonid Nagornoff (1925–2011), Finnish Olympic sailor
- Leonid Nazarenko (born 1955), Russian football coach
- Leonid Novikov (born 1984), Russian orienting competitor
- Leonid Novitskiy (born 1968), Russian rally driver
- Leonid Oleinicenco (born 1981), Moldovan football administrator
- Leonid Osipov (1943–2020), Soviet water polo player
- Leonid Ostrovski (1936–2001), Latvian football manager
- Leonid Pakhomov (born 1943), Russian football manager
- Leonid Pavlovski (born 1949), Russian field hockey player
- Leonid Pumalainen (born 1970), Russian high jumper
- Leonid Rakovshchik (born 1938), Russian rower
- Leonid Ratner (born 1937), Ukrainian handball coach
- Leonid Reshetnikov (footballer) (born 1986), Russian footballer
- Leonid Rivkind (born 1991), Russian-Israeli curler
- Leonid Rodionov (born 1993), Russian footballer
- Leonid Romanov (born 1947), Soviet fencer
- Leonid Rumyantsev (1916–1985), Russian footballer
- Leonid Saar (1913–2010), Estonian athlete
- Leonid Sagayduk (1929–1998), Soviet swimmer
- Leonid Shaposhnikov (born 1969), Ukrainian rower
- Leonid Sharf (born 1982), Ukrainian-American footballer
- Leonid Shchukin (1945–2026), Russian multi-sport coach
- Leonid Shevchenko (1932–2017), Russian football coach
- Leonid Shmuts (born 1948), Soviet footballer
- Leonid Shvetsov (born 1969), Russian long-distance runner
- Leonid Slutsky (football manager) (born 1971), Russian football coach
- Leonid Smirnov (footballer) (1889–1980), Russian footballer
- Leonid Solovyov (footballer) (1917–2004), Russian footballer
- Leonid Spiridonov (born 1980), Kazakhstani wrestler
- Leonid Spirin (1932–1982), Soviet Olympic gold medalist
- Leonid Srdić (born 2002), Swiss-Bosnian footballer
- Leonid Svirid (born 1967), Belarusian judoka
- Leonid Taranenko (born 1956), 1980 Olympic weightlifting champion for the Soviet Union
- Leonid Tcaci (born 1970), Moldovan football manager
- Leonid Teliga (1917–1970), Polish navigator and the first from his country to circumnavigate the globe
- Leonid Tiukhtyaev, rider of the Two Eagles Balloon
- Leonid Tkachenko (footballer) (1953–2024), Russian football manager
- Leonid Todorovski (born 1998), Macedonian basketball player
- Leonid Toropchenko (1968–2017), Russian ice hockey player
- Leonid Tyagachyov (born 1946), Russian sports administrator
- Leonid Urlichich, better known as Crazy Leo (born 1985), Russian-Canadian rally driver
- Leonid Vershinin (born 1977), Belarusian hurdler
- Leonid Voloshin (born 1966), Russian Olympian
- Leonid Yachmenyov (1938–2021), Russian basketball coach
- Leonid Yekimov (born 1987), Russian sport shooter
- Leonid Zakharov (rower) (born 1930), Soviet rower
- Leonid Zaslavsky (born 1969), Ukrainian-Australian wrestler
- Leonid Zayko (born 1948), Russian volleyball player
- Leonid Zhabotinsky (1938–2016), Soviet weightlifter and Olympic gold medalist
- Leonid Zolkin (1892–1958), Russian footballer
- Leonid Zuyev (born 1991), Russian footballer

== Fictional characters ==
- Leonid, the protagonist in Alexander Bogdanov’s 1908 Russian science fiction novel Red Star
- Leonid, the protagonist in the Labyrinth trilogy of cyberpunk novels written in the late 1990s by Russian science fiction writer Sergei Lukyanenko (Labyrinth of Reflections, False Mirrors, and Transparent Stained-Glass Windows).
- Leonid, the protagonist in Jonathan Hickman's S.H.I.E.L.D. comic
- Leonid Gorbovsky, in Arkady and Boris Strugatsky's series of science fiction novels set in the Noon Universe
- Leonid Kovar, Russian superhero also known as Red Star
- Leonid McGill, Manhattan private detective in fiction written by Walter Mosley
- Leonid Pavel, Russian nuclear scientist in The Dark Knight Rises

== Miscellaneous ==
- Leonid Karnov (born 1976), Russian serial killer responsible for the death of five individuals between 2005 and 2008
- Leonid Aleksandorovich Kuvayev (born 1972), Russian e-mail spammer and convicted child molestor
- Leonid Rozhetskin (1966–20??), Russian-American financier and lawyer who disappeared in 2008; remains found in 2013
- Leonid Sednev (1903–1942), Chef's assistant to Tsar Nicholas II
- Leonid Stadnyk (1970–2014), Ukrainian man named "world's tallest living man" by Guinness World Records 2008
- Leonid Toptunov (1960–1986), reactor control engineer killed in the Chernobyl disaster

== See also ==
- Alvis Leonides, a British air-cooled radial piston aero-engine
- Leonidas (disambiguation)
- Leonid (crater)
- Leonīds Beresņevs
- Leonids Dreibergs
- Leonīds Kalniņš
