= Leonides =

Leonides is a Greek name and may refer to:

== People ==
- Leonides of Alexandria (died AD 202), Christian martyr and father of Origen
- Leonidas of Alexandria (fl. 1st century AD), Greek epigrammatist active in Rome

== Other ==
- Alvis Leonides, 1930s British piston aircraft engine
- Leonides, junior synonym of the noctuid moth genus Erocha

== See also ==
- Leonide
- Leonids
- Leonid (disambiguation)
- Leonidas (disambiguation)
