= Bodnarchuk =

Bodnarchuk (Cyrillic: Боднарчук) is a Ukrainian surname. Notable people with the name include:

- Andrew Bodnarchuk (born 1988), Canadian professional ice hockey defenceman
- Basil Bodnarchuk (1925–2006), Ukrainian Orthodox metropolitan bishop
- Ioann Bodnarchuk (1927–1994), Ukrainian Orthodox hierarch
- Leonid Bodnarchuk (1938–2015), Ukrainian scientist
- Mariola Bodnarchuk (born 2002), Ukrainian former rhythmic gymnast
