= Asymptote (disambiguation) =

An asymptote is a line that a curve approaches as the independent variable tends to some value.

Asymptote may also refer to:

- Asymptote Architecture, an architectural design firm
- Asymptote (journal), an online magazine featuring literature translations

== Science and Technology ==
- Asymptote (vector graphics language)
- Asymptotic analysis, a method for describing limiting behaviour
- Asymptotic computational complexity, in theory of computation
- Asymptotic curve, a concept in differential geometry
- Asymptotology, which studies limiting cases in applied mathematical systems
- Asymptotic expansion
- Method of matched asymptotic expansions, a method in mathematics for computing the solution to a singularly perturbed problem such as a boundary layer in a fluid flow
