= Labzov =

Labzov (Russian: Лабзов), Labzoff or Labzow (masculine), or Labzova (Лабзова; feminine) is a surnames in Russia and former Soviet states. The surname comes from the word labza, the Old Russian name for a barn or flour rows. Another meaning is flatterer or deceiver.

== People with the surname ==
- Artsiom Labzov, Belarus ice hockey referee on International competitions in 2020, 2018, 2017
- Leonid Labzov (born 1973), Soviet and Russian ice hockey player
