= Leonid Manevitch =

Russian physicist, mechanical engineer, and mathematician (1938–2020)

- Леонид Исакович Маневич
- Born: Leonid Isakovich Manevitch; 2 April 1938; Mogilev, Soviet Union
- Died: 20 August 2020 (aged 82); Mytishchi, Russia
- Resting place: Volkovskoye Cemetery, Mytishchi
- Citizenship: Soviet Union (1938–1991) → Russian Federation (1991–2020)
- Education: Dnipro National University
- Scientific career
- Fields: Physics
- Workplaces: Yuzhnoe Design Bureau, Semenov Institute of Chemical Physics, Moscow Institute of Physics and Technology

Leonid Isakovich Manevitch (Russian: Леонид Исакович Маневич; 2 April 1938 – 20 August 2020) was a Soviet and Russian physicist, mechanical engineer, and mathematician. He made fundamental contributions to areas of nonlinear dynamics, composite and polymer physics, and asymptotology.

== Biography ==
Manevitch was born on 2 April 1938 in Mogilev (USSR, now Belarus). He received his M.S. with great distinction in mechanics (1959) and his Candidate of Sciences (PhD, 1961) and Doctor of Sciences (1970) from Dnipro National University.

From 1959 to 1964, Manevitch worked on missile design as an aerospace engineer and head of the Stress Analysis Team under Mikhail Yangel at the Yuzhnoye Design Office.

In 1964, he became an associate professor at Dnipro National University. His doctoral thesis was devoted to asymptotic and group-theory methods in the mechanics of deformable solids. He was promoted in 1973 to Full Professor in the Department of Applied Theory of Elasticity.

After moving to Moscow in 1976, he worked as a senior research fellow and later as head of the Division of Polymer Physics and Mechanics at the Semenov Institute of Chemical Physics of the Russian Academy of Sciences. In 1984, he was appointed a professor of polymer physics and mechanics at the Department of Molecular and Chemical Physics of the Moscow Institute of Physics and Technology.

== Scientific activity ==
Several of his works are devoted to the connections between physics and mathematics, and in particular, asymptotology.

Manevitch made significant contributions to the theory of nonlinear normal oscillations in essentially nonlinear systems, to nonstationary dynamics of nonlinear oscillatory systems; to molecular dynamics and physics of polymers and composite materials. His research has numerous applications in various fields of mechanical science and engineering, polymer physics, and nanotechnology. Under his leadership, the Division of Polymer Physics and Mechanics became one of the world's leading research teams in its field. His team actively collaborated with leading research centers in the USA, Italy, France, Israel, and Germany.

A detailed review of the scientific activities of Prof. L.I. Manevitch can be found in

== Publications ==
L.I. Manevitch was an active participant at many Russian and international symposia, conferences and congresses. As a guest speaker he repeatedly appeared at seminars of famous universities in the USA, European countries and Israel.

His scientific results are presented in 20 monographs and in more than 400 publications.

=== Books ===
- Problems of Nonlinear Mechanics and Physics of Materials (book)
1. Manevitch L.I.: Interaction of Physics and Mathematics. Moscow-Izhevsk: Izhevsk Institute of Computer Researches (2018) (in Russian).
2. Manevitch L.I., Kovaleva A.S., Smirnov V.V., Starosvetsky Yu.: Nonstationary Resonant Dynamics of Oscillatory Chains and Nanostructures. Singapore: Springer Nature (2017).
3. Manevitch L.I., Gendelman O.V.: Analytically Solvable Models of Solid Mechanics. Moscow-Izhevsk: Izhevsk Institute of Computer Researches, (2016) (in Russian).
4. Manevitch L.I., Gendelman O.V.: Tractable Models of Solid Mechanics. Formulation, Analysis and Interpretation. Berlin, Heidelberg, London, New York, Springer (2011).
5. Manevitch L.I., Smirnov V.V.: Solitons in Macromolecular Systems. New York, Nova Science Publishers (2008).
6. Manevich A.I., Manevitch L.I.: The Mechanics of Nonlinear Systems with Internal Resonances. Imperial College Press, London (2005).
7. Andrianov I.V., Awrejcewicz J., Manevitch L.I.: Asymptotical Mechanics of Thin-Walled Structures. Berlin, Heidelberg, New York, Springer (2004).
8. Andrianov I.V., Barantsev R.G., Manevitch L.I.: Asymptotical Mathematics and Synergetics, Moscow, URSS (2004) (in Russian).
9. Manevitch L.I., Andrianov I.V., Oshmyan V.G.: Mechanics of Periodically. Heterogeneous Structures, Berlin, Heidelberg, New York, Springer (2002).
10. Andrianov I.V., Manevitch L.I.: Asymptotology. Ideas, Methods, and Applications. Dordrecht, Boston, London. Kluwer Academic Publishers (2002).
11. Awrejcewicz J., Andrianov I., Manevitch L.: Asymptotic Approaches in Nonlinear Dynamics: New Trends and Applications. Berlin-Heidelberg –New York, Springer-Verlag. (1998).
12. Vakakis A.F., Manevitch L.I., Mikhlin Yu.V., Pilipchuk V.N., Zevin A.A.: Normal Modes and Localization in Nonlinear Systems. New York: Wiley (1996).
13. Andrianov I.V., Manevich L.I.: Asymptotology: Ideas, Methods, Results, M., ASLAN (1994) (in Russian).
14. Manevitch L.I., Pavlenko A.V.: Asymptotic Method in Micromechanics of Composite Materials. Kiev, Vyshchaya Shkola (High School) (1991) (in Russian).
15. Andrianov I.V., Manevitch L.I.: Asymptotic Methods and Physical Theories. Moscow: Znanie (1989) (in Russian).
16. Manevitch L.I., Mikhlin Yu.V., Pilipchuk V.N.: The Method of Normal Oscillations for Essentially Nonlinear Systems. Moscow: Nauka (1989) (in Russian).
17. Andrianov I.V., Lesnichaya V.A., Loboda V.V., Manevitch L.I.: Investigation of Strength of Reinforced Shells of Engineering Structures. Kiev-Donetsk, Vyshchaya Shkola (High school) (1986) (in Russian).
18. Andrianov I.V., Lesnichaya V.A., Manevitch L.I.: The Averaging Method in Statics and Dynamics of Ribbed Shells. Moscow: Nauka (1985) (in Russian).
19. Manevitch L.I., Pavlenko A.V., Koblik S.G.: Asymptotic Methods in the Theory of Orthotropic Solids. Kiev: Vysshaya Shkola (High School) (1982) (in Russian).
20. Mossakovskii V.I., Manevitch L.I., Mil’tzin A.M.: Modeling of Strength of Thin Shells. Kiev: Naukova Dumka (1977) (in Russian).
