= List of ambassadors of Russia to Mauritania =

Ambassador of the Russian Federation to the Islamic Republic of Mauritania
- Emblem of the Russian Foreign Ministry
- Incumbent; Boris Zhilko since 4 February 2021
- Ministry of Foreign Affairs; Embassy of Russia in Nouakchott
- Reports to: Minister of Foreign Affairs
- Seat: Nouakchott
- Appointer: President of Russia
- Term length: At the pleasure of the president
- Website: Embassy of Russia in Mauritania

The ambassador extraordinary and plenipotentiary of the Russian Federation to the Islamic Republic of Mauritania is the official representative of the president and the government of the Russian Federation to the president and the government of Mauritania.

The ambassador and his staff work at large in the Embassy of Russia in Nouakchott. The post of Russian ambassador to Mauritania is currently held by Boris Zhilko, incumbent since 4 February 2021.

== History of diplomatic relations ==
Diplomatic relations between the Soviet Union and Mauritania were established on 12 July 1964. Ivan Lavrov was appointed ambassador on 8 March 1965. With the dissolution of the Soviet Union in 1991, the government of Mauritania recognized the Russian Federation on 29 December 1991. The Soviet ambassador, Vladimir Shishov, continued as representative of the Russian Federation until 1994.

== List of representatives (1965–present) ==
=== Soviet Union to Mauritania (1965–1991) ===
Name	Title	Appointment	Termination	Notes
Ivan Lavrov	Ambassador	8 March 1965	14 June 1968	
Vladimir Gnedykh	Ambassador	14 June 1968	12 July 1972	
Mirzo Rakhmatov	Ambassador	12 July 1972	12 February 1975	
Vladimir Startsev	Ambassador	12 February 1975	5 October 1981	
Ivan Spitsky	Ambassador	5 October 1981	16 October 1986	
Leonid Komogorov	Ambassador	16 October 1986	24 September 1990	
Vladimir Shishov	Ambassador	24 September 1990	25 December 1991	

=== Russian Federation to Mauritania (1991–present) ===
Name	Title	Appointment	Termination	Notes
Vladimir Shishov	Ambassador	25 December 1991	22 March 1994	
Tigran Karakhanov	Ambassador	22 March 1994	12 January 1998	
Valery Sukhin	Ambassador	12 January 1998	21 January 2003	
Leonid Rogov	Ambassador	21 January 2003	15 August 2008	
Vladimir Baybakov	Ambassador	15 August 2008	11 November 2014	
Vladimir Chamov	Ambassador	11 November 2014	4 February 2021	
Boris Zhilko	Ambassador	4 February 2021		
