= Maria Belakhova =

- Born: Мария Андреевна Белахова; 1903; Old Hops
- Died: 1969 (aged 65–66); Moscow
- Spouse: Leonid Belakhov

Maria Belakhova (Russian: Мария Андреевна Белахова, 1903–1969) was a Russian writer and educator known for her work in children's literature and education in the Soviet Union, mentorship of many of the country's prominent children's writers, and her own works. She was editor of the Soviet magazine Children's Literature and the head of the national commission for children's literature.

== Biography ==
Maria Belakhova (née Maria Bogoslovskaya) was born in the town of Old Hops near Michurinsk, Russia, in 1903. The thirteenth child in the family, she left the family to study. For several years, she taught in an elementary school, before continuing her studies with a master's degree in child education and literature. Then she worked at the Children's Literature magazine and eventually became its editor. Later, she was elected head of the commission of the national guild of writers for children's literature.

She wrote several books of her own, authored or edited numerous works by other writers, including Samuil Marshak, and mentored many writers.

A school and a street are named after Belakhova in her birth town, and a street in the city of Michurinsk.

Belakhova was married to Leonid Belakhov, a Soviet general and administrator, whose name she took.
