= Leonid Martynyuk =

Russian opposition author, video producer and journalist (born 1978)

Leonid Sergeyevich Martynyuk
- Леони́д Серге́евич Мартыню́к
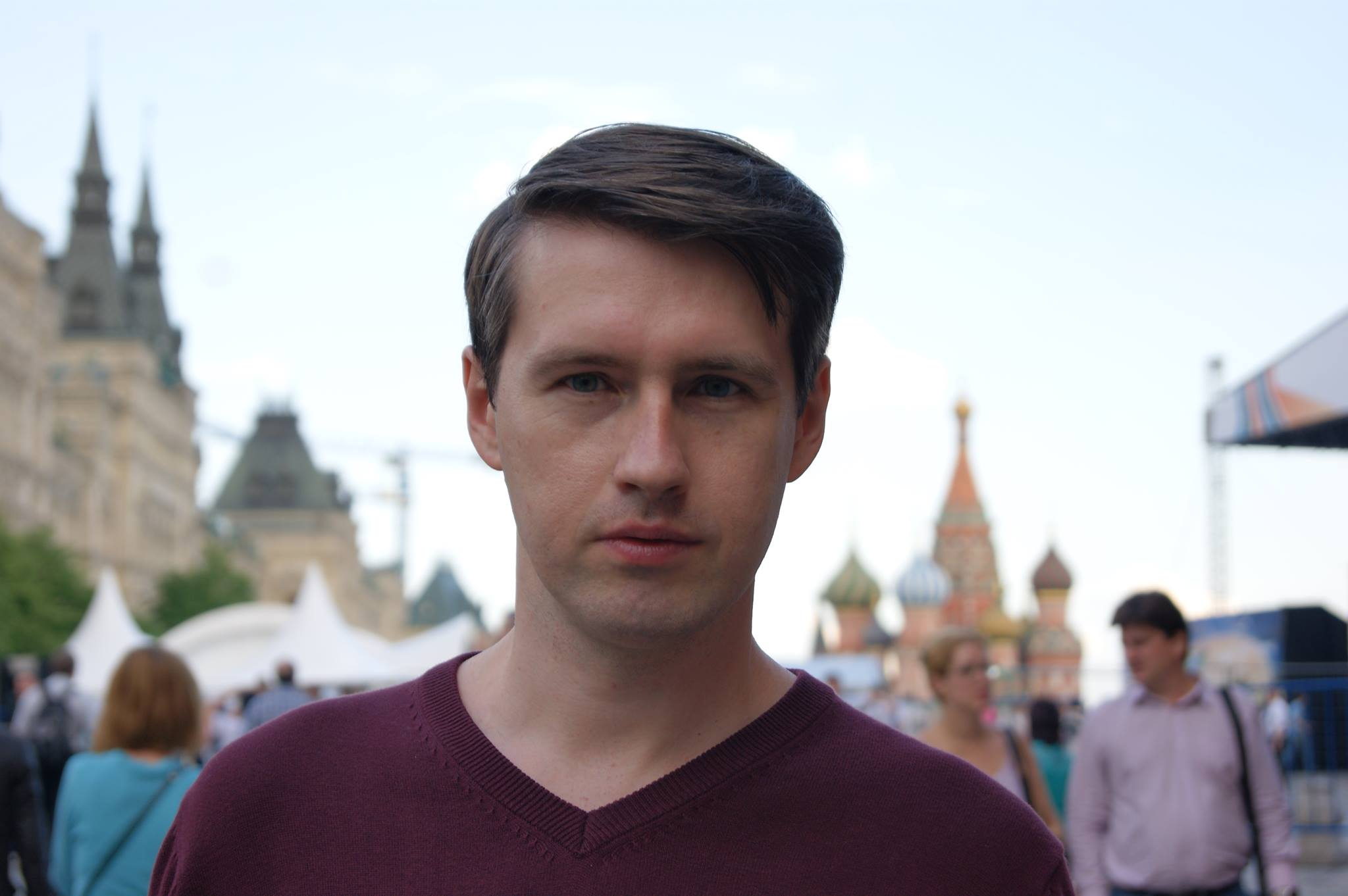
- Born: June 20, 1978 (age 48); Lviv, Ukraine
- Education: Kuban State University (MA) Bauman Moscow State Technical University Open Russia
- Political party: Solidarnost

YouTube information
- Channel: The Lies of Putin's Regime
- Years active: 2008–present
- Subscribers: 173,000
- Views: 62.7 million
- Last updated: 4 August 2026

Leonid Martynyuk (Russian: Леони́д Серге́евич Мартыню́к) (born June 20, 1978) is a Russian opposition author, video producer and journalist.

== Biography ==
Born in Lviv, Ukraine, Martynyuk graduated from Kuban State University (KubSU) with a Master's degree in Sociology in 2001. He graduated from Bauman Moscow State Technical University with Certificate of Business Administration and Management in 2004, and studied at the School of public policy of the Open Russia foundation in 2005-2006.

From 1999 to 2006 Martynyuk worked in the campaign headquarters and the executive committee of the Krasnodar branch of the Union of Right Forces party and represented the organization in election commissions. From 2006 to 2008 he worked as PR-manager on a Nokia project in the company Agency of Humanitarian Technologies - South.

== Political activity ==
Martynyuk is a member of the political councils of the Solidarnost (Solidarity) opposition movement and a former member of the political councils of the People's Freedom Party. He worked in the Krasnodar office of the Union of Right Forces party from 1999 to 2006.

He is a co-author of the reports The Life of a Galley Slave (Palaces, Yachts, Cars, Planes and Other Accessories), Winter Olympics in the Sub-Tropics: Corruption and Abuse in Sochi and Putin. War.

Martynyuk is the author of a viral YouTube channel titled The Lies of Putin's Regime, which has a total of over 55 million views for all the videos posted.

== Persecution in Russia ==
In August 2014, the Moscow arbitration court began hearings on the claim launched by Vladimir Yakunin, the head of Russian Railways, one of the largest state-owned companies, against the authors of the investigative report Winter Olympics in the Subtropics, Boris Nemtsov, a leader of the Russian opposition, and Leonid Martynyuk. The plaintiff asked the court to require the defendants to refute them and to pay jointly and severally to 3 million rubles. A representative of Russian Railways claimed: "Almost all of the Russian Railways' negative reputation abroad is due to the defendants' report. The media reprinted this report in whole or partially about 400 times, including statements about Russian Railways. This greatly distorted the entire news media image of Russian Railways. It became negative."

Leonid Martynyuk was arrested in Krasnodar, Russia, on August 23, 2014, when he and his wife were traveling on the commuter train from Sochi to Krasnodar, a provocateur attacked Leonid Martynyuk, but the police wound up seizing and accusing Leonid Martynyuk of "hooliganism" (Art. 20-1). He spent 10 days in jail. According to Boris Nemtsov, this incident was staged in retaliation against opposition activity of Leonid Martynyuk, triggered in particular by his movie "Who Shot Down the Boeing over Donbass?", which had collected a million hits. The co-сhairs of the People’s Freedom Party Boris Nemtsov and Mikhail Kasyanov issued a statement, in which they called the charges of hooliganism fabricated. They argued that "the court refused to view the security camera footage, which would have rendered Leonid's absolute innocence obvious."

On March 4, 2015, a complaint on the arrest was sent to the ECtHR. On May 26, 2015, Alexander Popkov, a lawyer of the human rights organization Agora, said that the Strasbourg Court had registered his complaint; and he received a respective notification of the ECtHR. "The complaint to the ECtHR concerns Martynyuk's unlawful detention and trial, which resulted in his 10-day arrest," the RAPSI quotes Popkov as saying. Martynyuk has won the case in 2019.

== Career in the United States ==
Since December 29, 2014 Leonid Martynyuk has been living in New York City.

In 2015, Leonid Martynyuk co-authored the independent report Putin. War, based on materials collected by the late Russian opposition leader Boris Nemtsov. He wrote a chapter on the downing of Malaysia Airlines Flight MH17 and conducted in-depth research into Russia’s military involvement in Ukraine. In 2016, Martynyuk participated in the report’s presentation in Atlantic Council in Washington, DC, and New York City, drawing attention to the Kremlin’s covert operations in Donbass.

Martynyuk began working as a journalist for Voice of America in June 2022, contributing articles and video reports that focus on Russian politics, disinformation, and international affairs. His work for VOA continues his long-standing commitment to investigative journalism and exposing authoritarian practices, particularly within the Russian government. Through in-depth reporting and analysis, Martynyuk provides insights into the Kremlin's narratives and their global impact.

On May 30, 2025, Leonid Martynyuk was among more than 500 Voice of America employees laid off by the U.S. Agency for Global Media (USAGM), which oversees the government-funded news outlet. Kari Lake, a senior adviser at USAGM, called Voice of America an example of government waste. All remaining VOA staff are expected to receive reduction-in-force notices in the summer of 2025, likely marking the end of the network founded over 80 years ago to counter National Socialist propaganda during World War II.
