= Leonid Sagayduk =

Soviet swimmer and coach

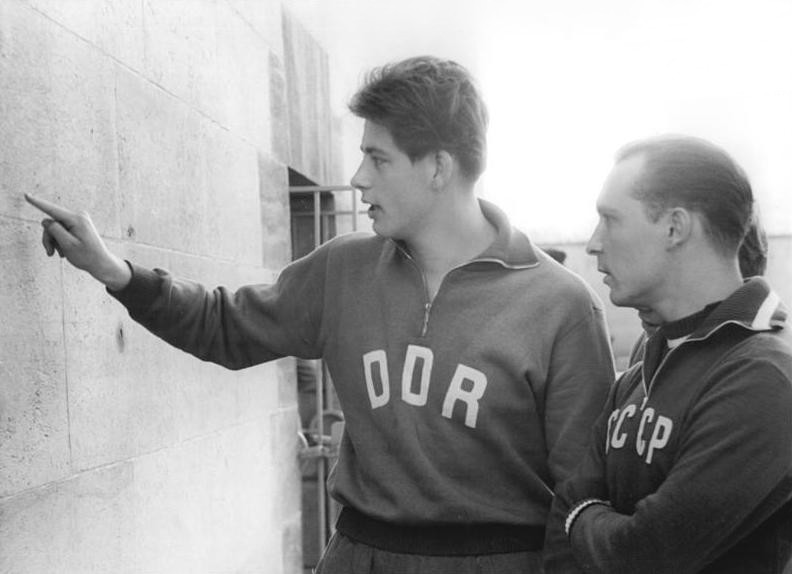
- Hans Zierold and Leonid Sagayduk (right) in 1957

Personal information
- Born: 1929
- Died: 1998 (aged approximately 69)

Sport
- Sport: Swimming

Leonid Georgiyevich Sagayduk (1929–1998) was a Soviet swimmer and swimming coach. He competed at the 1952 Summer Olympics in the 100 m backstroke, but failed to reach the final. He won four national backstroke titles in 1951, 1956, 1957 and 1959.

After retiring from competitions, between 1963 and 1991 he worked as a swimming coach and a teacher at the Lesgaft Institute of Physical Education in Saint Petersburg. During the last 20 years he was the head coach of Saint Petersburg team.
