= Leonid Bykovets =

Soviet airman (1921–1997)

Leonid Alexandrovich Bykovets
- Born: 14 December 1921; Kolomna, Soviet Union
- Died: 7 July 1997 (aged 75); Kolomna, Russian Federation
- Burial place: Old Cemetery, Kolomna
- Military career
- Allegiance: Soviet Union
- Branch: Soviet Air Force
- Service years: 1940–1960
- Rank: Colonel
- Unit: 28th Guards Fighter Aviation Regiment
- Conflicts: World War II; Operation Bagration
- Awards: Hero of the Soviet Union; Order of Lenin; Order of the Red Banner (4); Order of Alexander Nevsky; Order of the Great Patriotic War (2); Order of the Red Star (2)

Guards Colonel Leonid Alexandrovich Bykovets (Russian: Леонид Александрович Быковец, 14 December 1921 – 7 July 1997) was a Soviet airman who was awarded the title of Hero of the Soviet Union in 1945 for valour during the German-Soviet War.

== Early life ==
Bykovets was born in Kolomna, near Moscow in the Soviet Union in 1921 into a working class family. He graduated from high school in 1937 at the age of 16 and worked as a projectionist in his hometown. He got his pilot's licence two years later in 1939, and joined the Red Air Force as a volunteer in 1940.

== German-Soviet War ==
Just before the dawn of the German-Soviet War in 1941, he graduated from military flight school and was assigned to a combat unit in December 1942. He joined the Communist Party of the Soviet Union the following year.

From his first aerial combat engagement in late 1942 until May 1945, Bykovets made 220 sorties and shot down 19 enemy aircraft while flying solo and four as part of a group. During the course of the war he received the Order of Lenin, the Order of Alexander Nevsky, two Orders of the Great Patriotic War, both first class, two Orders of the Red Star and was awarded the Order of the Red Banner an unprecedented four times.

He also received the title of Hero of the Soviet Union in August 1945 for "the exemplary performance of command assignments at the front against the Nazi invaders and for displaying courage and heroism". He finished the war with the rank of Guards Senior Lieutenant.

== Later life ==
In 1947, he graduated from a military flight school in navigation skills, and was promoted to colonel in 1949. He was the vice-commanding officer of the 28th Guards Fighter Aviation Regiment until 1960, when he retired from the air force at the age of 39. He returned to Kolomna, where he worked in a factory until the late 1980s. He died aged 75 in his hometown in July 1997, which was then part of the Russian Federation.

== Posthumous recognition ==
In the aeroclub at Kolumna, there is a plaque dedicated to him.
