= Leonide =

Leonide or Léonide is a masculine given name which may refer to:

- Leonide or Leonid of Georgia (1861–1921), Catholicos-Patriarch of All Georgia
- Leonid Berman (1896–1976), Russian Neo-romantic painter and theater and opera designer
- Léonide H. Cyr (1926–2009), Canadian politician
- Léonide Massine, French transliteration of Leonid Fyodorovich Myasin (1896–1979), Russian choreographer and ballet dancer
- Léonide Moguy (1899–1976), born Leonid Mogilevsky, Ukrainian-born French film director, screenwriter and film editor

== See also ==
- Leonid, another given name
