= Leonid Marinich =

Belarusian diplomat

Leonid Marinich is a Belarusian diplomat who served as ambassador extraordinary and plenipotentiary of Belarus to Uzbekistan in 2018–2025. He was appointed on 5 March 2018 by president Alexander Lukashenko. He previously worked as First Deputy Minister of Agriculture and Food.
