= Leonid Vokuyev =

Russian ombudsman (born 1948)

Leonid Mikhailovich Vokuyev (Russian: Леонид Михайлович Вокуев; born June 10, 1948) was the Commissioner For Human Rights of the Komi Republic until 26 March 2007. In November 2006, he filed a lawsuit against the Russian pop duo T.A.T.u., stating that the title of their second studio album, Lyudi Invalidy, was insulting to handicapped people.

== Speeches ==
In November 2006, Vokuyev addressed the issue with various disability organizations. According to them, a text from the booklet of t.A.T.u.'s album Lyudi Invalidy contained derogatory remarks against handicapped people:

Люди инвалиды не знают, что значит быть человеком. Они – подделка на основе человекообразной болванки. Они не живут, а функционируют. Их функции описываются законами механики и ещё четырьмя признаками: жестокость, глупость, жадность, подлость.

"Disabled people" don't know what it means to be human. They are an imitation, based on an anthropoid template. They do not live—they merely function. Their functions are described by the laws of mechanics and by four traits: cruelty, stupidity, greed, meanness.

Vokuyev filed a complaint with the Public Prosecutor of Moscow, Yuri Syomin, which states that the inscription offends the honour and dignity of persons with disabilities. The appeal requests that "administrative measures" be taken. Vokuyev believes that the text annotation to the album is contrary to Article 21 of the Constitution, which stipulates that "nobody is to harm the dignity of any citizen" [paraphrased]. Vokuyev said that the group can be held criminally liable for slander and public insult, as well as to collect a million rubles in moral damages.

In an interview with a local newspaper, Vokuyev stated:

Я здесь у себя в кабинете через компьютер прослушал этот диск. Прослушал песню вместе с инвалидами. Её текст — тоже полная чушь. Припев там примерно такой повторяется постоянно: у инвалидов нет ночи любви, и просыпаются они без любви.

I have listened to this disc here in my office, on my computer. I listened to the song about disabled people. The text is also nonsense. The chorus is repeated constantly: the disabled spend their nights without love, and they wake up without love.

According to him, further release of the disc should be prohibited.
