= Leonid Filimonov =

Russian politician (1935–2022)

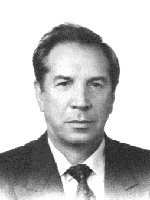

Minister of Oil and Gas of the Soviet Union
- In office 3 August 1989 – 22 July 1991
- Preceded by: Vasili Dinkov
- Succeeded by: Lev Churilov

Member of the Federation Council of Russia
- In office 11 January 1994 – 24 January 1996

Member of the Legislative Duma of Tomsk Oblast
- In office 1997–2001

Personal details
- Born: Leonid Ivanovich Filimonov; 22 August 1935 Davlekanovsky District, Bashkir ASSR, Russian SFSR, Soviet Union
- Died: 7 February 2022 (aged 86)
- Party: CPSU
- Education: Ufa State Petroleum Technological University

Leonid Ivanovich Filimonov (Russian: Леонид Иванович Филимо́нов; 22 July 1935 – 8 February 2022) was a Russian politician.

A member of the Communist Party, he served as Minister of Oil and Gas from 1989 to 1991. He also served in the Federation Council from 1994 to 1996 and in the Legislative Duma of Tomsk Oblast from 1997 to 2001. He died on 8 February 2022, at the age of 86.
