= Leonid Zakharov =

Russian physicist (born 1947)

Leonid Eremeyevich Zakharov (Russian: Леони́д Ереме́евич Заха́ров; born 14 January 1947) is a Russian physicist who is a researcher at Princeton University. He attended Lomonosov Moscow State University (1965–1971). He was awarded the status of Fellow in the American Physical Society, after they were nominated by their Division of Plasma Physics in 2007, for "contributions to the theory and numerical calculation of magnetohydrodynamic equilibria, stability, and transport in toroidal plasma confinement devices and for innovative ideas concerning the development of a lithium walled tokamak as an approach to an economic reactor."

He was in 2011 an invited speaker at the 53rd annual meeting of the Division of Plasma Physics of the American Physical Society held in Salt Lake City, Utah and in 2018 an invited speaker at the ENN Symposium on Compact Fusion Technologies held in Langfang, China.

== See also ==
- List of fellows of the American Physical Society (1998–2010)
