= Leonid Golikov =

Hero of the Soviet Union

- Леонид Александрович Голиков
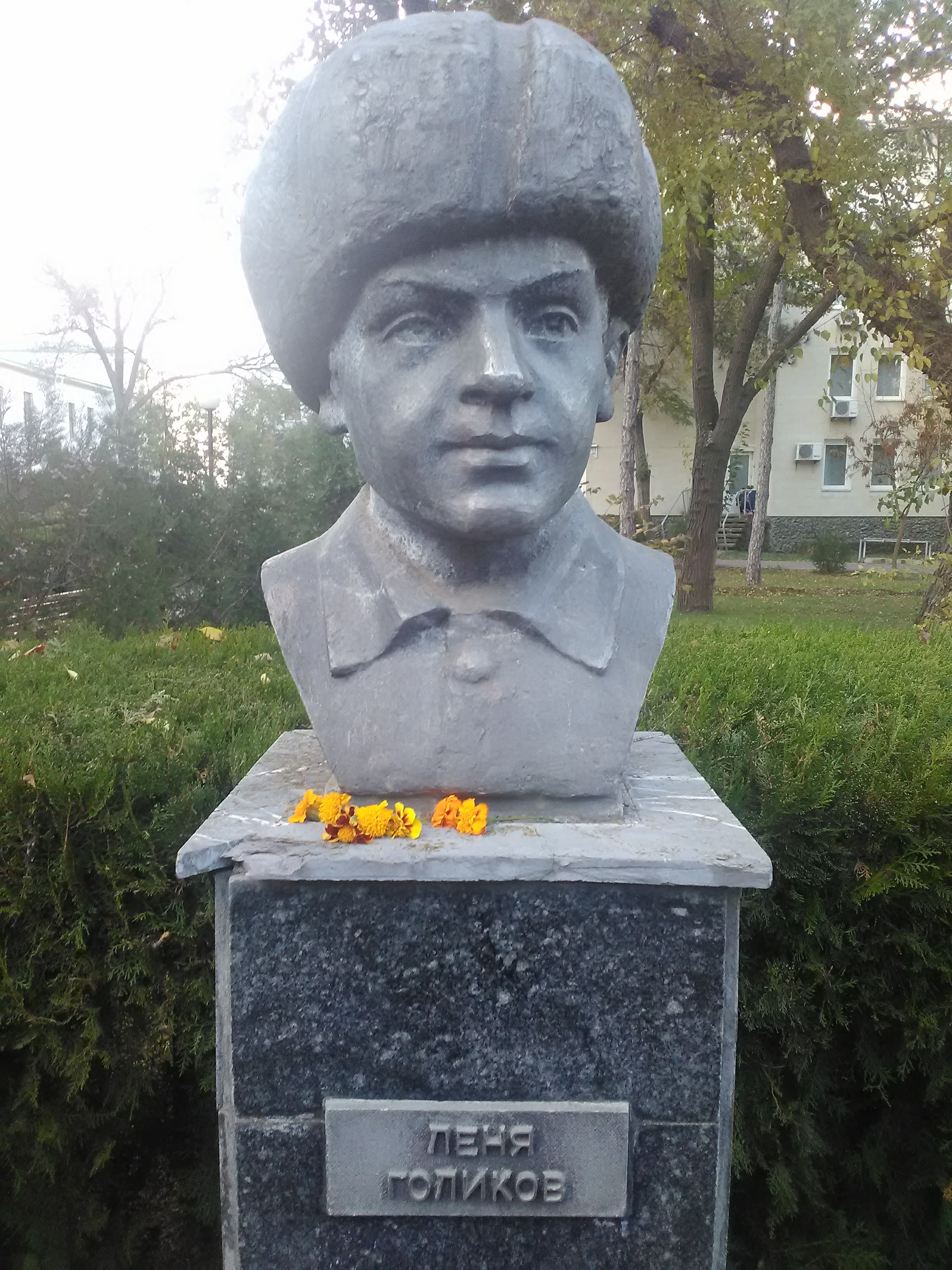
- Golikov2
- Born: Leonid Aleksandrovich Golikov; 17 June 1926
- Died: 24 January 1943 (aged 16)
- Occupation: partisan during World War II
- Known for: Hero of the Soviet Union (posthumously)

Leonid Aleksandrovich Golikov (Russian: Леонид Александрович Голиков); (17 June 1926 – 24 January 1943) was a Soviet partisan during World War II who was posthumously recognized as a pioneer hero and received the Hero of the Soviet Union.

== Biography ==
Golikov was born on 17 June 1926 in the village of Lukino, Starorusskiy uyezd, Novgorod Governorate (now Parfinsky District, Novgorod Oblast) to a working-class family. He graduated after seven years of school, and worked in a plywood factory in Parfino.

Golikov was a brigadier-scout of the 67th detachment of the Fourth Leningrad Partisan Brigade that operated in the Novgorod and Pskov regions. He participated in 27 military operations and distinguished himself in the takeover of German garrisons in the villages of Aprosovo, Sosnitsa, and North.

He killed 78 Germans and destroyed two railway bridges, twelve highway bridges, two food and fodder warehouses, and ten armed vehicles. Golikov accompanied a wagon train with 250 carts of food to besieged Leningrad. For his valor and courage he was awarded the Order of Lenin, the Order of the Red Banner, the medal "For Courage", and the medal of the Partisan of the Patriotic War II degree posthumously.

On 13 August 1942, Golikov returned from a reconnaissance mission along the Luga-Pskov highway near the village of Varnitsy in the Strugo-Krasnensky district, and reportedly tossed a grenade to blow up the car in which German Major General of the Engineering Troops Richard von Wirtz was travelling. The detachment commander's report indicated that in a firefight, Golikov shot the general, the officer, and driver. This report was disputed, as in 1943–1944, Wirtz commanded the 96th Infantry Division, and was captured in 1945 by American forces. The scout delivered a briefcase with documents to the brigade headquarters. Among them were drawings and descriptions of new samples of German mines, inspection reports to higher command, and other important military papers. Golikov was posthumously nominated for the title of Hero of the Soviet Union.

Golikov died in battle on January 24, 1943, in the village of Ostray Luka, Pskov Oblast. He was included in the list of pioneer heroes, though he was 15 years old at the beginning of the war.

== Golikov's photo ==
For a long time, it was believed that Golikov's photographs did not survive and that his sister, Lida, posed for the portrait created by Viktor Fomin in 1958. Golikov's original photo was found afterwards.

Essayist Anatoly Vakhov wrote about Golikov's accomplishments. During the Great Patriotic War, his first book of essays on partisans, Nine Fearless (Девять бесстрашных) (1944), was published. Vakhov's book contains a photograph of Golikov on page 61, taken behind enemy lines by a LenTASS correspondent, as evidenced by a stamp in the lower right corner. As G. Svetlov, a former political instructor of the reconnaissance company of the 3rd Leningrad Partisan Brigade, said,

...when the journalist Korolkov began collecting materials about Golikov, Vakhov's book was not in bookstores or libraries. And the readers who bought it tried to destroy it so as not to get into trouble. Why? ... Vakhov mentioned many leaders of the Leningrad party organization, who after the war were declared "enemies of the people." And it was dangerous to keep such literature during the time of Stalin's personality cult.

Svetlov reported that he “kept his archive in accordance with all the rules of conspiracy” and that his copy of the book is possibly “the only one that has survived from the entire circulation of ten thousand copies. There are two photographs of Golikov presented in the books of A. Vakhov and Y. Korolkov, but neither are a reliable photograph of him.

== Recognition ==
- In honor of Golikov, a children's camp was named in the city of Zelenogradsk, Kaliningrad Region. A monument is also erected there.
- A street in the city of Kaliningrad bears the name of Lenya Golikov.
- A street in the city of Omsk bears the name of Lenya Golikov.
- A street in the city of Donetsk bears the name of Lenya Golikov.
- In honor of Lenya Golikov, Golikov Lane was named and a monument was erected in the city of Yoshkar-Ola (Republic of Mari El).
- Secondary school № 13 in Yoshkar-Ola (Republic of Mari El) was named in honor of Golikov.
- A street was named in honor of Golikov in the Kirovsky district of St. Petersburg (between Veterans Avenue and Narodnogo Opolcheniya Avenue).
- Streets in Veliky Novgorod (boulevard, street), Pskov, Staraya Russa (lane), Okulovka, Kaliningrad, Donetsk, the villages of Pola and Parfino, and others are also named after Golikov.
- Golikov's name was borne by a children's camp in the Ramensky district of the Moscow Oblast, owned by SKTBE OJSC.
- One of the ships of the Novgorod Club of Young Sailors was named "Partizan Lenya Golikov".
- In the village of Yagodnoye, near Tolyatti, on the territory of the former pioneer camp «Алые паруса» ("Scarlet Sails"), a monument to Golikov was installed.
- The monument to Golikov was erected on the square in Veliky Novgorod.
- On the territory of the Exhibition of Achievements of National Economy, a bust by the sculptor N. Kongiser is installed at the entrance to Pavilion No. 8.
- Golikov was the prototype of the character of the Russian-Japanese-Canadian animated fantasy film First Squad.
- In 2015, the bas-relief of Golikov was installed on the Alley of Pioneer Heroes (Ulyanovsk).

== Sources ==
- Герои Советского Союза: Краткий биографический словарь / Пред. ред. коллегии И. Н. Шкадов. — М.: Воениздат, 1987. — Т. 1 /Абаев — Любичев/. — 911 с. — 100 000 экз. — ISBN отс., Рег. No. в РКП 87–95382
