= Leonid Rabichev =

Russian-Soviet writer (1923–2017)

Leonid Nikolayevich Rabichev (30 June 1923 – 20 September 2017) was a Soviet and Russian writer, graphic artist and World War II veteran. Rabichev authored thirteen poetry books and one memoir book.

== Military career ==
In 1942 Rabichev graduated from a military academy. In December of the same year he became a lieutenant and platoon commander of the 100th Separate Airborne Surveillance Army Company of the 31st Soviet Army. At the Central, 3rd Belorussian and First Ukrainian fronts Rabichev participated in the recaptures of several German-held Soviet cities (Rzhev, Sychev, Smolensk, Orsha, Barysaw, Minsk, Lida, Grodno). Later he fought in Eastern Prussia, Silesia and Czechoslovakia. He was awarded with two Orders of the Patriotic War, 2nd class, the Order of the Red Star and medals.

== Post-war life ==
In 1960 Rabichev became a member of the Artists' Union of the USSR. Together with his wife Victoria Shumilina Rabichev traveled on cargo ships along taiga rivers of the Russian North (such as Sukhona and Northern Dvina). Rabichev's graphic works were exhibited several times in Moscow. In 1993 he became a member of the Writers' Union of Moscow. In 2005, Rabichev's war memoirs Voyna vse spishet (The War Will Excuse Everything) were published in the Russian literary magazine Znamya. Rabichev is an important documented witness, promoting claims of sexual violence carried out by the Red Army in East Prussia during the Soviet offensive.
