= Leonid Tskhe =

Russian contemporary artist (born 1983)

Leonid Tskhe (born 1983) is a Russian draughtsman and painter of Korean descent. He is one of the leading artists of his generation to emerge in the Russian contemporary art scene in the 2010s. In his artistic practice, Leonid Tskhe consistently deconstructs the academic method and tradition in which he was originally trained. He lives and works between St. Petersburg, Russia, and Offenbach/Frankfurt am Main, Germany. He is a member of the art group Sever-7 (North-7).

He was born in St. Petersburg, Russia.

== Education and career ==
Between 1998 and 2001, he studied at the Boris Ioganson Art Lyceum in St. Petersburg. From 2001 to 2007, he received classical academic training at the Ilya Repin St. Petersburg State Academy of Arts, where he studied in the graphics department under Andrey Pakhomov. In 2013, Tskhe joined the Sever-7 art group and enrolled in the "School for Young Artists" at the Pro Arte Institute in St. Petersburg. These two developments introduced him to international contemporary art practices. Between 2010 and 2019, he taught at the Academy of Arts. In 2013, on the Academy's premises, Tskhe and other members of Sever-7 launched unofficial experimental classes, which soon became known as the School of Active Drawing & Performative Posing. Since 2022, he has been attending the "Conceptual Drawing" class of Professor Manfred Stumpf at the Hochschule für Gestaltung Offenbach am Main.

Tskhe's works are part of major public and private art collections in Russia and Europe, including the State Tretyakov Gallery (Moscow), the State Russian Museum (St. Petersburg), the Moscow Museum of Modern Art, the BREUS Foundation (Moscow), the Contemporary Art Museum ART4 (Moscow), and the M HKA (Antwerp).

== Cycles ==
Leonid Tskhe works in cycles. They can feature works created with different techniques, but sharing some common aspects: formal, emotional, conceptual. The artist's major art cycles include Embraces (2024), Las Meninas (2024), The Risk-taker (2023), Ivory black (2021–2022), Rehearsals (2021), The Boy and the Ball of Thread (2018–2020), NeoPetersburg (2014–2018), Sever-7 (2014–2018), Palaces (2017), and Performative Drawing (2010–2017).

== Select exhibitions ==
=== Solo shows ===
- 2024 OhNE. Ivan Zubarev & Leonid Tskhe. Offenbach am Main
- 2024 Capriccio. Vladey, Moscow
- 2023 The Risk-taker and the Magician. Vlad Kulkov & Leonid Tskhe. Vladey, Moscow
- 2022 Mono. Ovcharenko Gallery, Moscow
- 2019 The Boy and the Ball of Thread. Ovcharenko Gallery, Moscow
- 2019 Plays. Name Gallery, St Petersburg, 2019
- 2018 Stagings. MMOMA, Moscow
- 2017 Personal Summer House. Name Gallery, St Petersburg
- 2016 Form as a Story. Freud's Dream Museum, St Petersburg
- 2015–2017 NeoPetersburg. Name Gallery, St Petersburg; ART4Ru Museum, Moscow; Mikhail Nesterov State Museum, Ufa
- 2013 Levopisanie. The "North-7" gallery, St Petersburg

=== Group shows ===
- 2024 Returned Look. Vladey, Moscow
- 2021 Unnamable. Selected works from the collection of the MMOMA. Arsenal Centre of Contemporary Art, Nizhny Novgorod
- 2021 Law Start. Futuro Gallery, Nizhny Novgorod
- 2021 Millennials. The State Russian Museum, St Petersburg
- 2020 The XXI Generation. A Gift by Vladimir Smirnov and Konstantin Sorokin. State Tretyakov Gallery, Moscow
- 2020 Birds' Concert. Tsaritsyno Museum, Moscow
- 2020 Every Artist is Someone's Child. MOST Gallery, St Petersburg
- 2020 Luxury. The Foundation of Vladimir Smirnov and Constantin Sorokin, Moscow
- 2020 MorMir. Kunsthalle nummer sieben, St Petersburg
- 2019 Lost & Found. North-7 Expedition. M HKA, Antwerp
- 2019 Cosmorama XVIII. Museum of Moscow
- 2018 SHARPPS-7 (The School of Active Drawing & Performative Posing Sever-7). Ovcharenko Gallery, Moscow
- 2018 Drawing Lesson. Name Gallery, St Petersburg
- 2017 The Phantom Knight. Tsaritsyno Museum, Moscow
- 2017 The Seventh Part of the World. Name Gallery, St Petersburg
- 2016 New Space. The Change (Kazan); the Centre for Urban Culture "The Truth", Moscow
- 2016 Contemporary Drawing. PERMM, Perm
- 2015 Picture after Painting. NCCA & the Academy of Arts, St Petersburg
- 2015 Complex Issues. The 13th Festival "Contemporary Art in the Traditional Museum", St Petersburg
- 2015 No Time. Parallel programme of the 6th Moscow Biennial for Contemporary Art, The Winzavod, Moscow
- 2015 Star City. The graduate show of the Pro Arte Institute's "School for Young Artists". The New Museum, St Petersburg
- 2014 Places. The 3rd International Art-Prospect Festival, St Petersburg
- 2014 Tower. Parallel programme of the Manifesta 10, the "North-7" gallery, St Petersburg

== Bibliography ==
- 2025 Leonid Tskhe. Catalogue. Moscow: Ovcharenko Gallery
- 2022 Edward Lucie-Smith, Sergei Reviakin. Russian Art in the New Millennium. London: Unicorn
- 2021 Femme Fatale Special issue. St Petersburg: Grafikkabinett WöD
- 2021 Every Artist is Someone's Child. Works on Paper of the 2010s Generation. St Petersburg: Grafikkabinett WöD
- 2020 The XXI Generation. A Gift by Vladimir Smirnov and Konstantin Sorokin. Moscow: State Tretyakov Gallery
- 2020 Millennials in Contemporary Russian Art. St Petersburg: State Russian Museum
- 2019 North-7. Catalogue. 2 Vols. St Petersburg: Grafikkabinett WöD
- 2018 Leonid Tskhe. Stagings. Exhibition catalogue. St Petersburg; Moscow: Name Gallery & MMOMA
- 2016 Innovation Prize 2015. Catalogue. Moscow: NCCA
