= Leonid Mezheritski =

Russian painter (1930–2007)

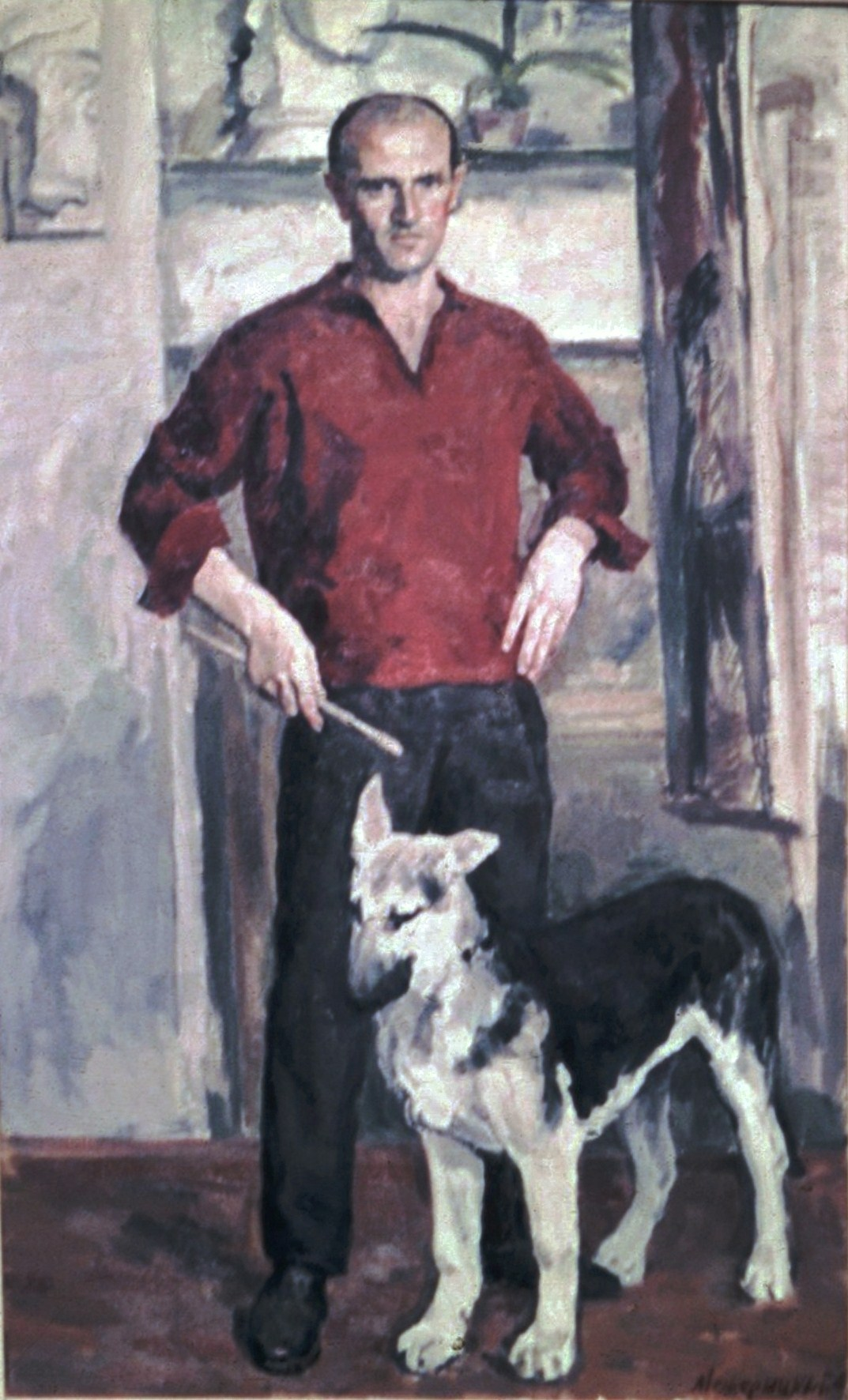
- Self Portrait with Dog, 1968. Chernihiv Art Museum
- Born: 11 December 1930; Odessa, Ukrainian SSR, Soviet Union
- Died: 12 November 2007 (aged 76); Berlin, Germany
- Known for: Painting: portrait, landscape, still life

Leonid Mezheritski (1930–2007) was a painter who lived and worked in Ukraine and Israel. His work is represented in the state museum collections of Ukraine and in international art discourse.

== Biography ==
Leonid Mezheritsky (Ukrainian: Леонід Якович Межерицький; Hebrew: לאוניד מז'ריצקי; Russian: Леонид Яковлевич Межерицкий) was born in Odesa on December 11, 1930.

In 1955, he graduated from the Odesa State Art School, easel painting studio of D. Frumina. His training was also supervised by L. Muchnik and M. Mutselmakher.

In 1971, Mezheritski joined the Union of Artists of the USSR (existing until 1991) and the Union of Artists of the Ukrainian SSR (after 1991 reorganized as the National Union of Artists of Ukraine). From 1955 onwards, he participated in numerous art exhibitions, including all-Ukrainian exhibitions in Kyiv and an all-Union exhibition in Moscow. Some of the works exhibited at these shows were acquired by the Union of Artists of Ukraine for transfer to a museum and cultural institution.

In the 1990s, the artist made creative trips to Germany, Israel, and Italy. From late 1998, he lived and worked permanently in the city of Karmiel (Israel). His Israeli period included a major series of landscapes (more than 60 works), several still lifes, and one portrait. In Germany, he created urban landscapes of Berlin and several pencil sketches; in Italy, he painted Tuscan landscapes.

Leonid Mezheritski spent the last year and a half before his death on November 12, 2007 in Berlin. He is buried at the Jewish cemetery Berlin-Weissensee. His artistic legacy is preserved and archived in Berlin and made available for art historical research.

== Artistic Style ==
Mezheritski worked primarily in oil painting in the genres of portraiture, still life, and plein air landscape. His artistic method was based on academic knowledge of drawing and composition, as well as on the study of coloristic systemsof French Impressionism and Post-Impressionism.

The artist is known for his psychologically nuanced portraits, distinguished by their attention to the inner state and character of the sitter. A significant part of his legacy consists of landscapes of Odesa and its Black Sea coast, northern Ukraine, the Israeli Galilee, Berlin, and Tuscany. Many works were created during plein air studies, characteristic of the Odesa painting tradition. Still Lifes runs as a continuous theme throughout the artist's work. Through concise compositional structure and his treatment of background and drapery, he resolved colouristic and plastic challenges. Occasionally, he introduced one of his favourite motifs - bouquets of blooming lilac - into his portraits, as seen, for example, in the canvas "Portrait of the Mother" (1966, oil on canvas, 70×90 cm).

Mezheritski's work was covered in Ukrainian and Israeli press and art publications. American artist and philosopher Adrian Piper wrote (2012) about his painting in Spike Art Magazine particularly noting the tension between realistic form and abstract energy of colour, the exceptional breadth of his palette, and the rhythmic, "musical" structure of his brushstrokes.

== Exhibitions and Collections ==
As an active participant in the institutional framework of art organizations during the 1950s–1970s, Mezheritski took part in Odesa regional and Ukrainian republican exhibitions and the Third All-Union Exhibition of Marine Painters in 1961 (the last of this level and direction in the USSR). Later, he significantly reduced his participation in official exhibitions. Some compositions created in the 1960s–1970s within the system of state art commissions were exhibited in public spaces of Soviet republics. In 1997, before leaving for Israel, he presented his work to the Odesa public at a retrospective exhibition at the Jewish Cultural Centre. In 1994 and 2000, he exhibited his works in Berlin, one in a solo show.

Mezheritski's work is represented in the collection of the Galagan State Art Museum in Chernihiv, Ukraine, by the work "Self-Portrait with a Dog" (1961, oil on canvas, 180×110 cm; included in the register of the Ukrainian Museum Fund). Works are also held in private collections in Ukraine, the United States, Canada, Germany, Great Britain, Israel, and Russia. Several landscape works were acquired in 1973 by the Japanese gallery Gekkōsō (Tokyo) and exhibited at exhibitions organized by the gallery.

== Gallery ==
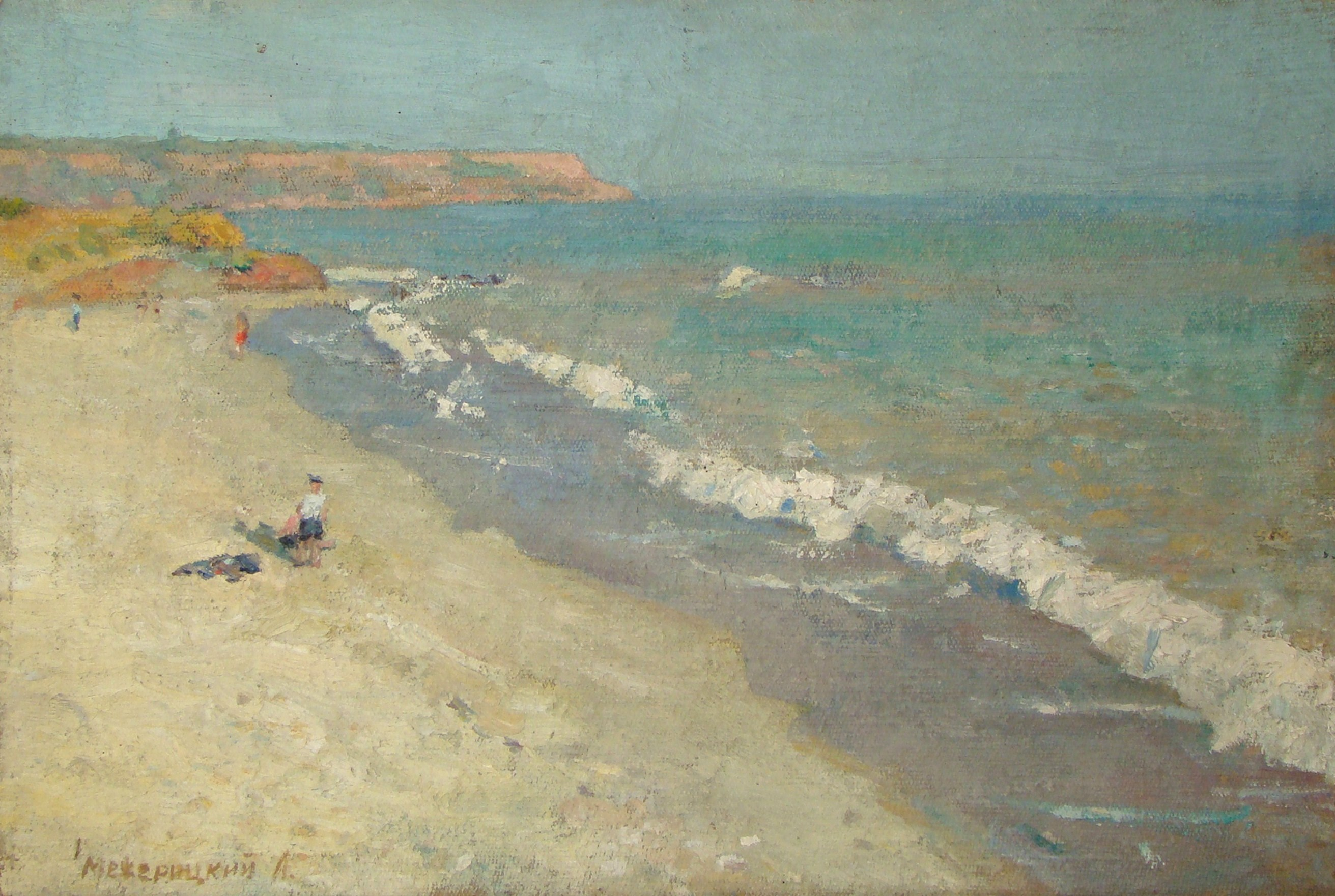
Springtime Sea Surf. 1970. Canvas, Oil, 28,5x43 cm

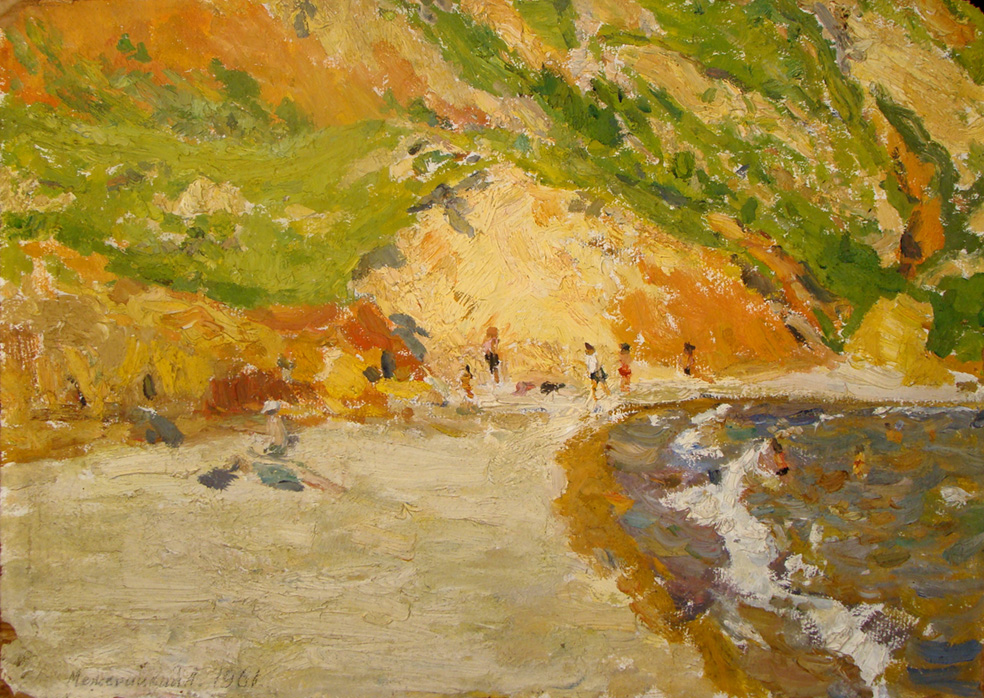
Beach of Bolshoy Fontan. 1961. Canvas, Oil, 49х71 cm

== Sources ==
- Lev Meshberg. "A Few Grateful Words About Odessa Artists", New York, 1985. The Blue Lagoon: Anthology of Modern Russian Poetry (in Russian). Vol. 3b. pp. 642 ff. (Russian: Лев Межберг. "Несколько благодарных слов об одесских художниках". Нью-Йорк, 1985. Антология новейшей русской поэзии У Голубой Лагуны). ISBN 978-0-89250-344-5.
- Dina Frumina. “My Memories”. Edition: “Galereya “Most”, Odessa. 2005 (in Russian). (Russian: Д. Фрумина. «Мои воспоминания»)
