= Leonid Dovladbegyan =

Russian and Armenian entrepreneur

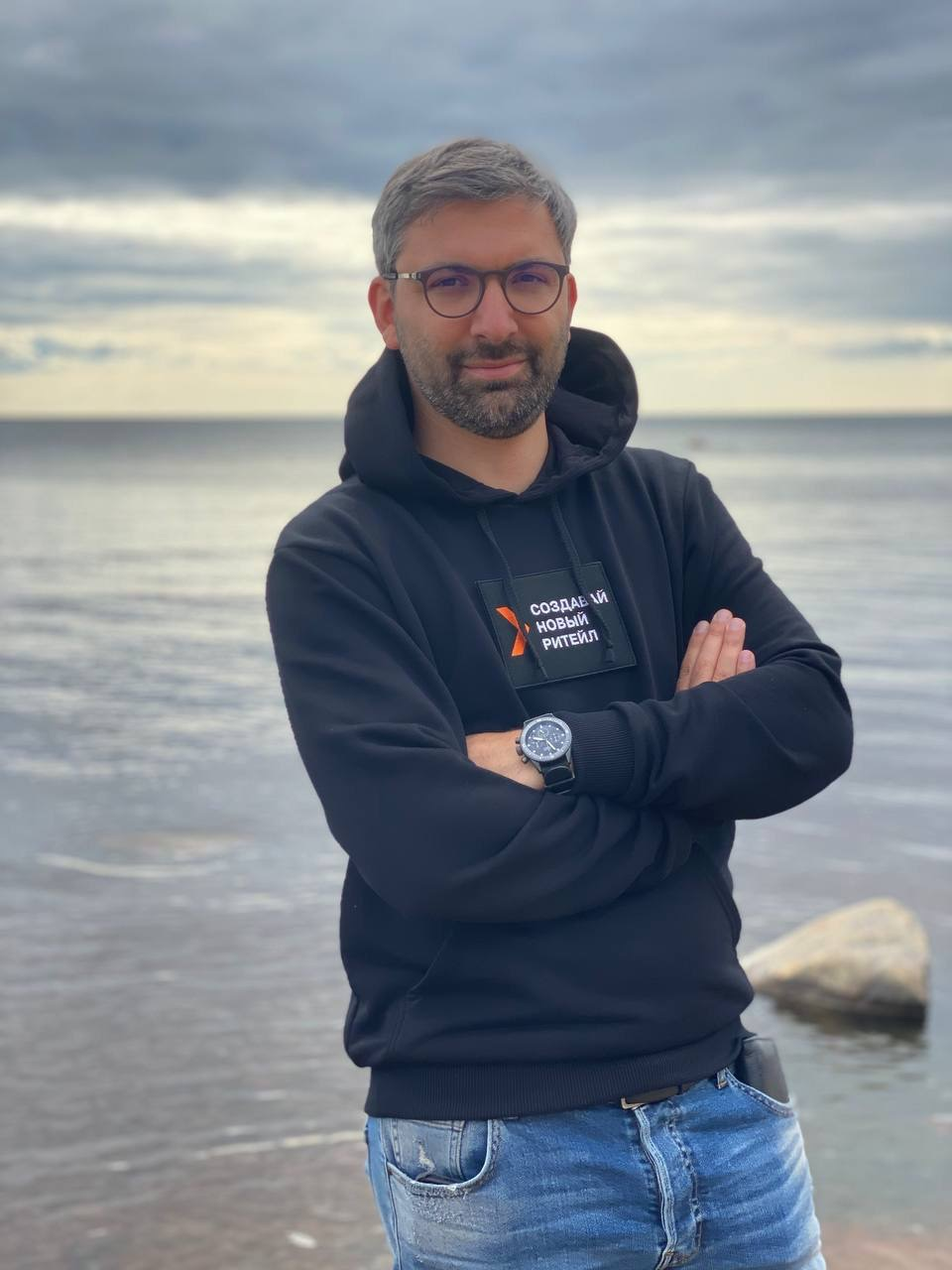
- Born: March 1, 1985 (age 41); Leningrad, USSR
- Education: St. Petersburg University (Master's degree in Commercial Law)
- Occupations: entrepreneur, top manager, venture capitalist

Leonid Dovladbegyan (born March 1, 1985, in Leningrad, USSR) is a Russian and Armenian entrepreneur, top manager, and venture capitalist. From 2019 to July 2022, he has been the CEO of Vprok.ru Perekrestok.

== Education ==
In 2008, he graduated from the St. Petersburg University Faculty of Law with a master's degree in Commercial Law.

== Career ==
Leonid Dovladbegyan's entrepreneurial career started with e-commerce. From 2012 to November 2016, he held senior positions at 220 Volt, a chain of electric tool stores: from deputy department head to online store director. In his two years as the director of the online store, he increased its turnover tenfold and saw it rise to 9th place in Forbes' 2014 ranking of Russia's largest online stores. In 2015, he was appointed first deputy general director of the 220 Volt chain. As a result, the company ranked 13th in Forbes' 2015 list of the most expensive Runet companies. In the same year, 220 Volt started offering outsourcing services to DIY brands for the development and maintenance of online stores, including the processing and delivery of orders.

In 2015, Leonid Dovladbegyan became co-owner of the DIY platform Mastergrad, one of the largest construction forums in the CIS.

In 2016, he created LED, a marketing agency specializing in Russia-wide online sales Cyber Monday and Real Black Friday.

In 2017–2018, he sat on the board of directors of the Orteka retail chain and acted as its consultant.

In November 2018, he was appointed director for strategy and e-commerce at the Perekrestok retail chain (owned by X5 Group), where he was responsible for developing and implementing the strategy of the Perekrestok.ru online hypermarket, boosting its economic efficiency, and expanding distribution channels. He was one of the first in Russia to use the dark store format.

In August 2020, under his leadership, the online store was rebranded and received a new name: Vprok.ru Perekrestok. It was later spun off as an independent business unit within X5 Group, and Leonid Dovladbegyan became CEO of the new online hypermarket Vprok.ru Perekrestok.

In 2020, Vprok.ru Perekrestok's retail turnover grew threefold to almost RUB 15 bn, and X5 Group became the leading provider of online grocery delivery services in Russia for the first time in 13 years.

In 2021, Leonid Dovladbegyan started transforming the online hypermarket into Russia's first FMCG marketplace. He says the company was considering building an ecosystem centered on food and featuring a number of additional services.

Revenues of the online store Vprok.ru Perekrestok reached 21.5 billion rubles in 2021, while the available SKUs exceeded 75,000 items.

In July 2022, he left his office as the CEO of Vprok.ru Perekrestok. This decision was motivated by the shift in the business vision: Vprok.ru Perekrestok was expected to be de-merged from the X5 Group and then sold, followed by an IPO or upscaling together with a new partner. However, the shareholders have opted for a less aggressive reorganization of the holding's e-comm chapter.

== Investments ==
In June 2021, he invested in the Swedish hyperlocal grocery delivery company Vembla and got a seat on its board of directors.

In August 2021, he invested in a similar startup in Portugal called Bairro and became the chairman of its board of directors.

In 2022, the media reported on Dovladbegyan's intentions to invest in food tech startups in the Armenian market along with other local entrepreneurs.

== Awards ==
=== Personal ===
In 2020, he was named Best Executive at the Bolshoy Oborot (Big Turnover) E-Commerce Awards.

In December 2021, he was named Retail Leader of the Year by the international jury of the Team Awards.

=== Corporate ===
In 2020, Vprok.ru Perekrestok mobile app won the Summer Tagline Awards 2020 in the category From Home: Best Mobile/AR/VR/IoT Project. It also placed first in the Runet Ranking in the category Trade and Services.

In 2021, Vprok .ru Perekrestok was named Best Online Grocery Store at the Retailer of the Year Awards.
