= Leonid Komogorov =

Soviet diplomat (1927–2020)

- Леонид Михайлович Комогоров

Ambassador of the Soviet Union to Mauritania
- In office 16 October 1986 – 24 September 1990
- Preceded by: Ivan Spitsky
- Succeeded by: Vladimir Shishov

Personal details
- Born: 28 July 1927 Moscow, Russian Soviet Federative Socialist Republic, USSR
- Died: 29 April 2020 (aged 92)
- Education: Moscow State University of Economics; Higher Diplomatic School of the Ministry of Foreign Affairs of the USSR
- Awards: Order of the Badge of Honour; Medal "For Distinguished Labour"; Medal "Veteran of Labour"

Leonid Mikhailovich Komogorov (Russian: Леонид Михайлович Комогоров; 28 July 1927 – 29 April 2020) was a Soviet diplomat. He served in various diplomatic roles from the 1950s onwards, particularly with former French colonies in Africa, ending his career as Ambassador of the Soviet Union to Mauritania.

== Career ==
Komogorov was born on 28 July 1927 in Moscow, then part of the Russian Soviet Federative Socialist Republic, in the Soviet Union. He lived throughout the Axis invasion and occupation of parts of the Soviet Union during the Second World War, during which time he worked as an apprentice fitter at the Moscow Tool Plant from the age of fourteen. He completed secondary school in 1949 and entered Moscow State University of Economics. Graduating in 1954, he went to work for the Ministry of Forestry and Woodworking Industry, and in roles in the State Planning Committee and the Supreme Economic Council.

In 1964 Komogorov enrolled in the Higher Diplomatic School of the Ministry of Foreign Affairs of the USSR, graduating in 1967 and joining the Ministry of Foreign Affairs. His first posting was as Second Secretary of the Ministry's 1st African Department, between 1967 and 1968, before heading overseas in 1968 to serve as Second Secretary, and later First Secretary, at the Soviet embassy in Morocco until 1973. He returned to the Soviet Union that year, becoming First Secretary of the Ministry's Personnel Department, before returning to Africa in 1976 as advisor to the Soviet embassy in Cameroon. He was back in the USSR in 1979, becoming an advisor at the 2nd African Department of the Ministry of Foreign Affairs, before taking up the post of Head of the Ministry's Personnel Department in 1981.

Komogorov's final postings were in African countries, serving as Consul General at Oran in Algeria from 1984 until 1986, and then from 1986 until his retirement in 1990, as Ambassador of the Soviet Union to Mauritania. Over his career he had received the awards of the Order of the Badge of Honour, the Medal "For Distinguished Labour", and the Medal "Veteran of Labour". In 2018 he was also awarded the title of Honorary Worker of the Russian Ministry of Foreign Affairs. In addition to his native Russian, Komogorov was also fluent in French.

Komogorov died on 29 April 2020. The Russian Ministry of Foreign Affairs announced his death, describing him as a "sensitive, sympathetic and friendly person."
