= Leonid Grcev =

Macedonian electrical engineer (born 1951)

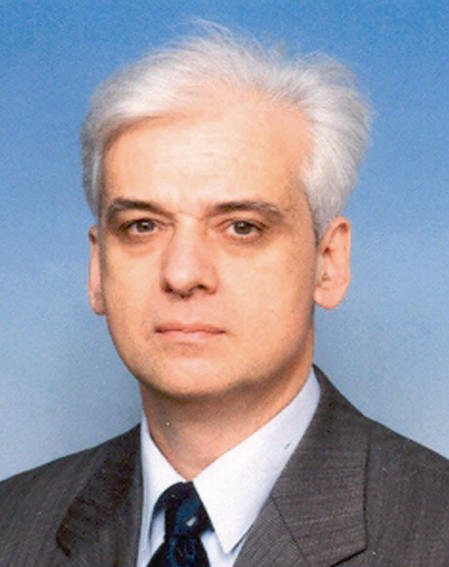
Leonid Grcev

Leonid Grcev (born 28 April 1951 in Skopje, FNR Yugoslavia) is an electrical engineer at Ss. Cyril and Methodius University in Skopje, North Macedonia.

Grcev was named a Fellow of the Institute of Electrical and Electronics Engineers (IEEE) in 2013 for his contributions to transient electromagnetic modeling of grounding systems.
