= Leonid Zuborev =

Belarusian author (born 1943)

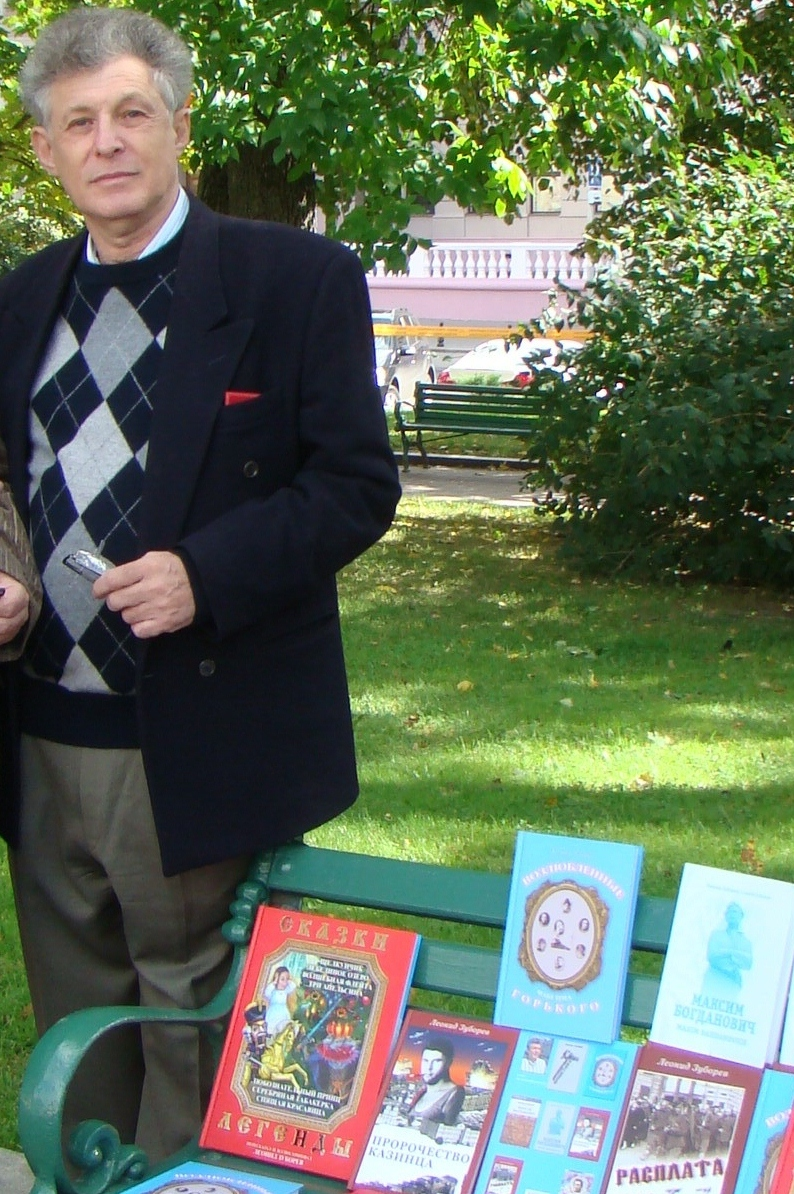
- Born: November 18, 1943 (age 82); USSR
- Education: Minsk State Linguistic University
- Occupations: Member of Union of Belarus Writers, Member of Association of USA Publishers
- Writing career
- Period: 1983–present
- Genres: Biographies, Historical Novels, and Children's Literature
- Notable works: Maxim Bahdanovich, Petrushka, The Curious Prince, Fairy Tales

Leonid Zuborev (Зуборев Леонид Иосифович, Зубараў Леанід Іосіфавіч, Зубарев; born November 18, 1943) is a Soviet born author and biographer from Minsk, Belarus. He has written 20 books (mostly in Russian) ranging from historical novels, biographies, and children's literature. He came to United States 25 years ago and continued to write in both English and Russian. Currently lives in Brooklyn, NY.

== Works ==
=== Books ===
- Maxim Bahdanovich (1989)
- The Curious Prince (2011)
- Petrushka (2011) + video
- Fairy-Tales (2011, Juliette, New York). ISBN 978-985-454-588-2
- Сказки Зубарева (2011)
- НесказАнная красота
- "Belarus" - Translation of U. Nyaklyaeu's verses - "Juliette, NY" (2015) ISBN 0-9722020-3-X
- Atomic Bomb For Russia
- Jews of Belarus
- Zmitrok Byadulya
- Artist Nataly Ivanchik
- MUSIC OF LOVE (Score & Lyrics) Minsk, 2016, ISBN 978-985-7101-88-7

=== Retold fables ===
- “The Nutcracker”
- “Swan Lake”
- “The Magic Flute”
- “Love for Three Oranges”
- “Sleeping Beauty”
- “Three Little Pigs”
- “Puss in Boots”
- “The Firebird”
- “By the Pike’s Command”
- “The Smoker & Death"
- "Petrushka"
- "What? Where? When?"
- "Thumbelina"
