= Leonid Ihorovych Krasnopolskyi =

Ukrainian entrepreneur (b. 1971, d. 2018)

Leonid Ihorovych Krasnopolskyi (February 9, 1971, Donetsk–February 4, 2018, Dnipro) was a Ukrainian entrepreneur, fashion designer, and volunteer in the Russian-Ukrainian war.

== Biography ==
Krasnopolskyi was born on February 9, 1971, in Donetsk. In 1994, he graduated from the Makiivka Civil Engineering Institute with a degree in civil engineering. In 1995, he started working in wholesale trade companies as a crisis manager and later as a commercial director. Since 2007, he has worked in the fashion industry, first as a director of the Donetsk branch of the Terra Nova chain, and since 2009 as the chairman of the board of a fashion factory he opened with the support of the famous fashion designer Mikhail Voronin.

With the outbreak of the war in Donbas, Krasnopolskyi and his wife began helping the Ukrainian army at checkpoints, but were imprisoned in the basements of the DPR due to a denunciation. He was released in an exchange and moved to Dnipro with his family. In Dnipro, as a volunteer, he started sewing military uniforms for the Ukrainian military and collected aid for prisoners of war.

== Death ==
Krasnopolskyi died in a car accident on February 4, 2018, in Dnipro. He was buried in accordance with Jewish traditions at the Zaporizhzhia Cemetery in Dnipro.
