= Leonid Murzin =

Russian linguist

- Leonid Murzin
- Born: May 27, 1930; Moscow, USSR
- Died: October 13, 1996; Perm, Russia

Academic background
- Education: Kuybyshev Pedagogical Institute (now Samara State Academy of Social Sciences and Humanities), 1952

Academic work
- Main interests: Linguistics, derivatology, culturology

Leonid Nikolayevich Murzin (Russian: Леони́д Никола́евич Мурзи́н, IPA: [lʲɪɐˈnʲit nʲɪkɐˈla(j)ɪvʲɪtɕ mʊrˈzʲin]; May 27, 1930 – October 13, 1996) was a Soviet and Russian linguist, the Dean of philological faculty at Perm State University (1964–1967), the founder and the head of General and Slavonic linguistics department at Perm State University; the head of Perm derivatology school; he founded the Institute of dynamic linguistics. Perm derivatology school encouraged the development of such linguistic school as "Computer based simulation of verbal communication".

== Sources ==
- Leonid Murzin at Russian Wikipedia: Мурзин, Леонид Николаевич // Википедия, свободная энциклопедия.
- Video with Leonid Murzin on YouTube
- The problems of dynamic linguistics: the proceedings of International conference, dedicated to the 80th Murzin's anniversary (in Russian) / отв. ред. В. А. Мишланов; Перм. ун-т. Пермь, 2010. С. 296—304. (Zip-архив материалов конференции).
