= Putin. War =

2015 report

Putin. War (Russian: Путин. Война) is a report based on materials prepared by the Russian opposition politician Boris Nemtsov about the 2014–present Russian military intervention in Ukraine. Published on the website Putin. Itogi on 12 May 2015, it covers the preparations for the annexation of Crimea by the Russian Federation and the involvement of Russian troops in the war in Donbas. The report includes testimonials of Russian soldiers taken prisoner in Ukraine and photos of Russian military personnel who died in the hostilities.

== Authors ==
Boris Nemtsov began working on the report at the end of January 2015. After Nemtsov's assassination, his close associate Ilya Yashin headed a team of opposition journalists and activists, who continued writing the report and prepared it for publication.

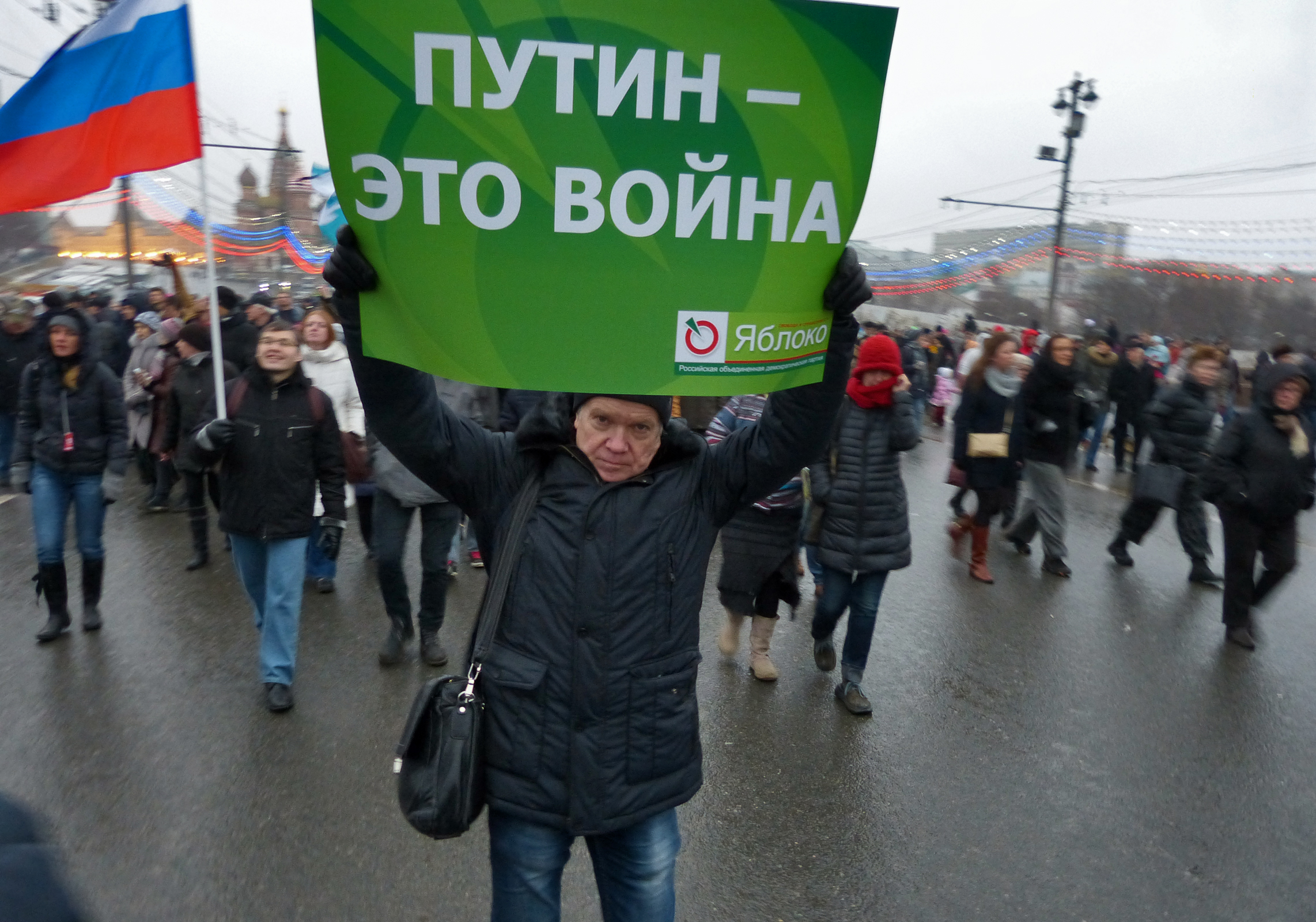
"Putin is war"

== Structure and content ==
The epigraph of the report is a post by Boris Nemtsov in Facebook on 31 January 2015:

The task of the opposition today is education and truth.
And the truth is that Putin is war and crisis.

The report consists of a preface, 11 chapters and a conclusion. It has 65 large-format pages with 46 color photographs and 8 charts.

Chapters:

1. Why Putin needs this war
2. Lies and propaganda
3. How they took Crimea
4. The Russian military in the east of Ukraine
5. Volunteers or mercenaries?
6. Cargo 200
7. Vladimir Putin's Army Depot
8. Who shot down the Boeing
9. Who rules the Donbas
10. The humanitarian disaster
11. What does the war with Ukraine cost?

Chapters cover the events from the beginning of Euromaidan when the Kremlin developed plans for the "annexation of Crimea" up to the start of 2015. The report includes information from relatives of Russian servicemen who died in Ukraine. The authors write that Putin's "hybrid war" involves doublethink, falsehoods and сowardliness, concluding:

The cowardly and despicable war unleashed by Putin will cost the country a lot. We will be paying for this adventure with the lives of our soldiers, economic crisis and political isolation.

We will pay with enmity from our long-time allies. No people are closer and more like kin to the Russians than the Ukrainians. These are our brothers - without any pathos -- and the war between Russians and Ukrainians in Donbas is impossible to characterize in any other way except as fratricide.

This war is the shame of our country. But the problem will not go away by itself. Putin must be stopped. And this can only be done by the Russian people themselves.

Let us stop this war together.

== English version ==
A special issue of the European Union Foreign Affairs Journal (EUFAJ) from Germany includes an English translation of the entire report as well as the original text in Russian (publication date 21 May 2015).

An American NGO, the Free Russia Foundation, also published a translation of the report into English. It was presented on 28 May 2015 at the Atlantic Council in Washington, D.C.

== Reactions ==
In Russia, 14 printing companies refused to publish the report. PayPal blocked an account raising funds for the report.

=== Statement to the Prosecutor General ===
The head of the NGO "Officers of Russia" Anton Tsvetkov sent a statement to the Prosecutor General of the Russian Federation with a request to verify the report Putin. War for the presence of false information. Tsvetkov said that the facts in the report are based on distorted and anti-Russian sources.

== Links ==
- Putin. War (in English)
- Доклад Немцова on putin-itogi.ru (in Russian)
- pdf-file of investigation on Google Drive (in Russian)
- Boris Nemtsov's parting shot
- Nemtsov's Report Finally To Be Published
