= Leonid Yandakov =

Russian journalist (1933–2025)

Leonid Loginovich Yandakov (Russian: Леонид Логинович Яндаков; 10 December 1933 – 6 August 2025) was a Russian journalist and playwright.

== Life and career ==
Yandakov was born in Yansitovo, Morkinsky District on 10 December 1933. He began his career in 1958, with his writings being published in the literary and art magazine "Onchyko", in particular, the story of Sarkysh (1975). Subsequently, stories and novels were written, such as "Chotkar" (2000), "Mamich Berdey" (2001) and "Onar" (2004), "Man from Space" (2007) and "Sar kysha" (2020). In addition to prose works, Yandakov is the author of dramatic works and plays, such as the comedies "Flower Festival" (1985), "Laugh, So Laugh" (1987), the drama "Cuckoo" (1989), staged on the stage of the Chuvash Drama Theater named after K. V. Ivanov, the musical comedy "Commotion in Pusaksol" (1994), "King Sow Thistle Pointer" (1995) and the comedy "Love? Love! Love..." (2002), staged on the stage of the Mari National Drama Theater named after M. Shketan.

In 1994, he was awarded the honorary title of Honored Journalist of Mari El, in 2008 - People's Writer of the Republic of Mari El (2008). In 2005, for the historical novels "Chotkar" and "Mamich Berdey", Yandakov was awarded the State Prize of the Republic of Mari El in the field of literature named after S. G. Chavain.

He was a Member of the Union of Writers of Russia since 2002.

Yandakov died on 6 August 2025, at the age of 91.
