= Leonid Petrov =

Russian historian

- Education: ANU; St. Petersburg State University
- Occupations: Academic researcher author

Leonid Petrov is a university academic and researcher in the study of North Korea and international relations in North East Asia. He is also has expertise in Asian history, Asian cultural studies, tourism management and multicultural studies.

== Education ==
Petrov graduated in 1994 from the St. Petersburg State University with a MA degree in Korean History and Language. He has a PhD from the Australian National University in 2003.

== Career ==
Petrov has worked as a translator for the Korean Soccer Team, he has also worked in academia at the university of Sydney, lecturing Korean History at the Intercultural Institute of California in San Francisco. as well as ANU College for Asia and the Pacific.

== North Korean expertise ==
He is a sought after media commentator in the inner workings of North Korea and the current regime. In early 2017, he said the current isolationist regime is in a state of war mentality and is pursuing a nuclear programme to prevent regime change. North Korea has not been integrated in the world economy system, hence it is able to survive the Communist bloc collapse of 1989, global and financial crisis in the Asian region and world in 2008. North Korea wants parity with the United States as a nuclear power.

=== China ===
His views included that China has very limited influence in North Korea. China has a vested interest in preventing a collapse of the north Korean regime as this would mean a refugee crisis on its border and a potential for US troops at the doorsteps of China's borders. China is still North Korea's closet ally.

=== Russia ===
Petrov mentioned Russia wants cooperation and stability in North Korea. If there is a collapse of the North Korean regime, there will be a power struggle between China, Russia and United States for influence in the North Asia sphere.

=== United States ===
Petrov said the rocket launches by North Korea is a gift to President Trump, it diverts attention away from him. The Obama Administration had a no negotiation strategy during its tenure. He thinks they miss an opportunity to do things differently avoid the current escalating situation it finds itself in now with the Stalinist regime.

=== Korean reunification ===
Petrov stated reunification will cost $10 trillion after the heightened fire and fury rhetoric between President Trump and supreme leader Kim Jong Un.

== Selected works ==
- Petrov, L 2012, 'Cyber Attacks May Spark New War in Korea', in 38 North, U.S.-Korea Institute at the Paul H. Nitze School of Advanced International Studies, Johns Hopkins University, (9 July 2012), pp. 1–3.
