= Leonid Frankfurt =

Russian-Israeli physicist

Leonid Lev Frankfurt (Russian: Леонид Львович Франкфурт; born 1941) is a Russian-Israeli physicist from Tel Aviv University. He was awarded the status of Fellow in the American Physical Society, after they were nominated by their Division of Nuclear Physics in 2007, for seminal contributions to high energy and high momentum transfer probes of hadrons and nuclei including: inventing the additive quark model, deriving the light front approach to nuclei, showing how to observe nucleon-nucleon corrections, and discovery of high-energy color transparency.

He graduated from Leningrad University.

== See also ==
- List of fellows of the American Physical Society (1998–2010)
