= Leonid Vasiliev =

Russian parapsychologist (1891–1966)

Leonid Vasiliev Леонид Васильев
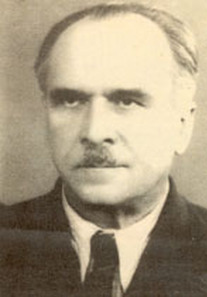
- Born: 1891
- Died: 1966 (aged 74–75)
- Occupation(s): Parapsychologist, physiologist

Leonid Leonidovich Vasiliev (Russian: Леонид Леонидович Васильев; 1891–1966) was a Russian Soviet parapsychologist and physiologist.

== Career ==
Vasiliev worked as a professor of physiology at Leningrad University. He helped establish the first parapsychology laboratory at Leningrad.

Vasiliev conducted experiments with subjects into telepathy and reported successful results. After Vasiliev's main experiments were completed, his laboratory staff made an official statement declaring "We have not established whether telepathy exists. We want to find out. Then we can say yes or no." His research was discontinued. Vasiliev's book Experiments in Mental Suggestion was translated into English in 1963 and was popular with Western parapsychologists.

Robin Waterfield stated that from the reports it was difficult to ascertain what controls there were in the experiments. The psychologist C. E. M. Hansel has criticized Vasiliev's experiments, stating that he "made little attempt to control the human factor in his experiments... insufficient information is given in Vasiliev's book about the precise conditions under which his experiments were carried out... The chief weakness lies in the lack of precautions against errors in recording and against the experimenter being affected by what he knows about the experiment."

Such criticism was echoed by the parapsychologist Stephen E. Braude, who stated that on the whole, "Vasiliev's experiments are not described in the kind of detail one would expect from a thoroughly scientific publication. Moreover, the long distance experiments are clearly preliminary in nature and invite various refinements in design, some of which were already planned when Vasiliev wrote his book. Nevertheless, his experiments are suggestive and deserve attempts at replication."

== Publications ==
- Mysterious Phenomena of the Human Psyche (1959)
- Experiments in Mental Suggestion (1963)
- Experiments in Distant Influence (1976)
