= Leonid Kryuchkov =

Ukrainian entrepreneur

- Born: 18 September 1979 (age 46)
- Occupation: entrepreneur

Leonid Kryuchkov (born September 18, 1979, in Kyiv) is a Ukrainian entrepreneur and the owner of one of the largest privately held tug fleet operations in Ukraine. Investor in projects and companies, involved in litigation funding and non-performing loans business. Mr. Kryuchkov is the owner of Contour Development and a co-owner of HEMPY.UA.

== Biography ==
=== Education ===
Kryuchkov graduated from the Kyiv National Economic University in 2001 with a master's degree in International business administration.

From 2001 to 2006 he studied at Igor Sikorsky Kyiv Polytechnic Institute majoring in “Industrial Marketing”.

2006 — Ph.D. in economics: “Mergers and acquisitions in high-tech sectors”.

=== Career ===
From 2001 to 2003, Leonid Kryuchkov worked at Raiffeisenbank Ukraine.

In 2003, he began collaborating with his brother, Dmytro Kryuchkov. Together, they became active participants in Ukraine's mergers and acquisitions market.

Between 2005 and 2008, the Kryuchkov brothers acquired a broad portfolio of construction companies across various sectors, including civil construction, energy, telecommunications, and oil and gas. Notable acquisitions included:

- Kyivrekonstruktsia – One of Ukraine's oldest construction firms. Leonid Kryuchkov was appointed CEO in 2004 and held the position until 2008, stepping down following the sale of a controlling stake in the company.
- JSC Naftogazbud – The largest oil and gas construction enterprise in Ukraine;
- SVEMON – The leading contractor for telecom network construction in Ukraine, where Leonid served as chairman of the supervisory board.
- CJSCo Ukrnaftogazbud – An oil and gas construction firm with international contracts
- Kharkivskii Enerhoproekt – The Kryuchkovs acquired a 30% stake in this key design institute for the South Ukraine and Zaporizhzhia Nuclear Power Plants.
- A number of principal construction companies engaged in the development of the Rivne, Khmelnytskyi, and Zaporizhzhia Nuclear Power Plants, among others.

Following the separation of business interests with his brother in 2009, Leonid Kryuchkov has independently managed projects primarily in real estate development, the energy sector, and maritime logistics.

He established ORUM to oversee the management of projects across multiple sectors.

=== Nuclear Fuel Production Plant ===
The joint Ukrainian-Kazakh-Russian enterprise "Ukrainian Nuclear Fuel Production Company" (JV UkrTVS) was established in 1995. In 2017, the State Property Fund of Ukraine held an auction at which it sold its 33% stake in JV UkrTVS to Weiss Trade LLC for UAH 56 million.

The primary investors were Leonid Kryuchkov, Serhii Tron, and Nurulislam Arkalaiev. Weiss Trade LLC planned to act as the financial partner in a project to construct a nuclear fuel production plant aimed at meeting the fuel needs of Energoatom and reducing Ukraine's dependence on Russian nuclear fuel. In addition to the construction of the plant, the project also envisioned the acquisition of a license from Rosatom for the production of nuclear fuel assemblies.

From 2018 to 2020, Kryuchkov, Tron, and Arkalaiev served on the supervisory board of UkrTVS.

=== Maritime logistics ===
In 2016, he founded a management company overseeing a group of enterprises offering comprehensive cargo logistics and ship maintenance services in the Mykolaiv port area. These services include towage, mooring, vessel bunkering, rail freight logistics within the port (including delivery/removal, dispatching, and maintenance of rolling stock), and stevedoring operations (cargo transshipment).

Additionally, his companies initiated the development of an investment project aimed at constructing grain and liquid cargo transshipment terminals at the Mykolaiv Sea Port.

=== Litigation funding and the non-performing loans ===
Leonid Kryuchkov is frequently cited in the media as an investor and co-owner of various projects and companies, particularly those engaged in litigation funding and the management of non-performing loan portfolios. His notable investment activities include:

- Participation in the bankruptcy proceedings of DIALIR, a major real estate development project in Kyiv;
- Legal actions resulting in the recovery of US$65 million from Ukrtransgas;
- Legal actions resulting in the recovery of US$125 million from Ferrexpo;
- Acquisition of a 33% equity stake in UkrTVS, a development company involved in the production of nuclear fuel for Ukraine's power plants.

In 2025, Sky-Development LLC, part of the ORUM Group, purchased from the Deposit Guarantee Fund claims worth over US$90 million against the enterprises of Kostyantyn Zhevago's Arterium pharmaceutical corporation.

=== Real estate development ===
In 2013 Kryuchkov founded Contour Development, a Kyiv-based real estate development company. The company owns several business and commercial centers in Kyiv and is engaged in the implementation of multiple real estate projects at various stages of development.

=== Hemp processing ===
In May 2024, Leonid Kryuchkov became a shareholder in HEMPY.UA, an industrial park focused on research and development, cultivation, and processing of industrial hemp. The company is engaged in the systematic breeding of new hemp varieties and the production of a wide range of hemp-based products.

=== Political Activity ===
From 2006 to 2007, Leonid Kryuchkov served as a member of the Kyiv City Council.

In 2019, he was a candidate for the Verkhovna Rada (Ukrainian Parliament) in the parliamentary elections.

=== Family ===
Leonid Kryuchkov is divorced and has a daughter, Varvara, and a son, Fedor.

His father, Vasyl Kryuchkov, was a scientist who worked at the National Academy of Sciences, and his mother was an engineer employed at "Kyivproekt."

His brother, Dmytro Kryuchkov, is a businessman and served as a Member of Parliament, representing Yulia Tymoshenko.
