= Leonid Margolin =

Russian musician (1957–2026)

Leonid Margolin Леонид Марголин
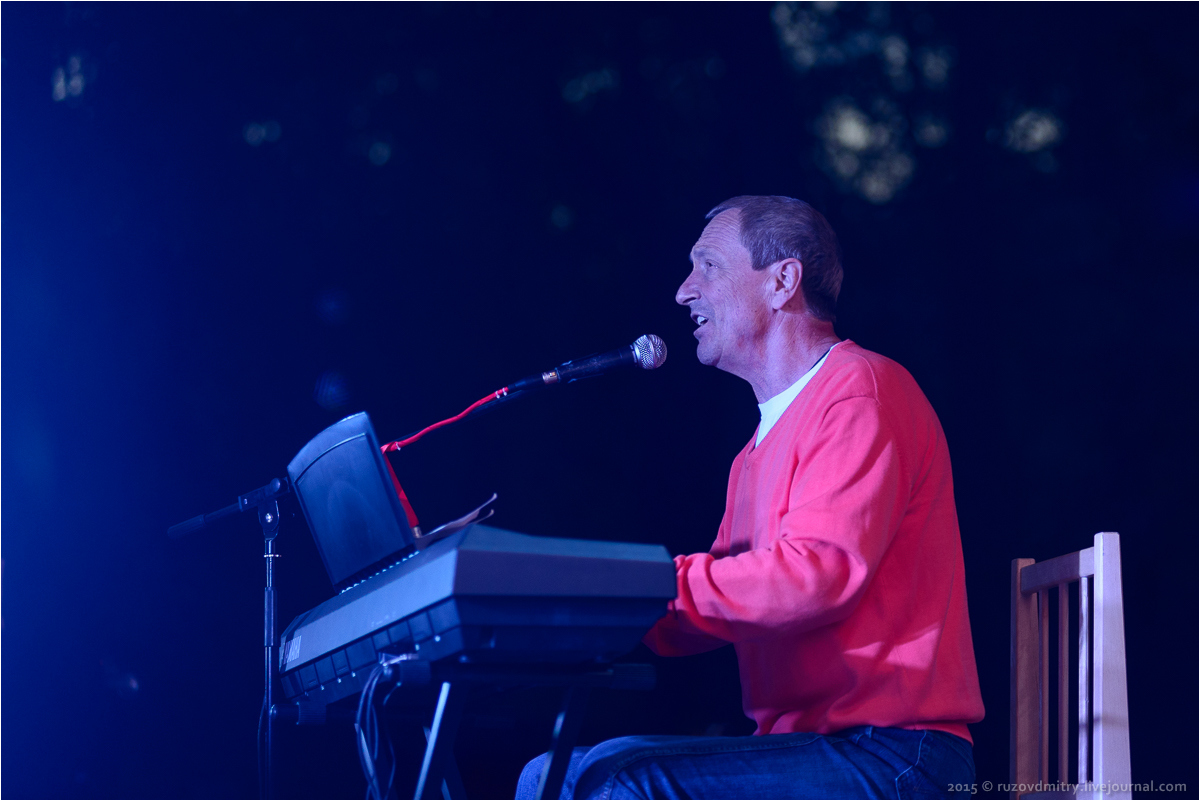
- Margolin in 2015

Background information
- Born: Leonid Yuryevich Margolin; 5 September 1957; Zhitkovichi, Gomel Oblast, Byelorussian SSR, Soviet Union
- Died: 25 July 2026 (aged 68)
- Genre: Bard
- Website: margolin.ru

Leonid Yuryevich Margolin (Russian: Леонид Юрьевич Марголин; 5 September 1957 – 25 July 2026) was a Russian musician, composer and arranger, who was known for his long-term collaboration as an arranger for Oleg Mityaev.

== Early life and career ==
Leonid Margolin was born in Zhitkovichi, Byelorussian SSR on 5 September 1957. He was the youngest among the five children of Yuriy Margolin, and his wife, a secretary typist.

Margolin started getting interested where he studied the Bayan. In 1972, after finishing eight grades of secondary school, he studied in a music college in the Mozyr, graduating and became a music director. His work was greatly influenced by the groups such as Pesniary and Deep Purple.

From 1978 to 1980, Margolin served in the Soviet Armed Forces. He was mistakenly assigned to the Construction troops after losing a copy of his music school diploma. At his place of service, in Romantsevo, he founded the vocal and instrumental ensemble "Impulse" at the Romantsevo House of Culture, which he continued to lead even after his discharge from the reserve. Under his direction, "Impulse" won a prize at the All-Union Competition of Vocal and Instrumental Ensembles and was awarded the title of People's Ensemble.

From 1998, Margolin participated in the recording of all of Oleg Mityaev's albums as an arranger, accompanist, and backing vocalist. He wrote the music for the album based on Joseph Brodsky's poems such as "Neither Country nor Churchyard...", and for Oleg Mityaev's songs "Chelyabinsk" and "Grace".

== Personal life and death ==
Leonid Margolin was married to Olga Margolina, who died in 2008 in a road traffic collision. They had two daughters together, Natalia and Zhanna.

Margolin died on 25 July 2026, at the age of 68.
