= Leonid Belakhov =

Soviet military general (1907–1975)

- Born: Leonid Yulianovich Belakhov; June 9, 1907; Vinnytsia, Russian Empire
- Died: June 9, 1975 (aged 68); Moscow, Soviet Union
- Awards: Order of Lenin

Leonid Yulianovich Belakhov (Russian: Леонид Юлианович Белахов; June 9, 1907 – June 9, 1975) was a general and a senior Soviet administrator at the time of World War II, and managed several strategic logistical programs that influenced the course of the war, including the transportation of war aid from the US through the Lend-Lease program and of troops and fuel for the beginning of the offensive against the Nazi Germany's invasion of the USSR.

== Biography ==
Arctic exploration

In 1937, after finishing the air force command academy, Belakhov was appointed head of political administration of the Chief Directorate of the Northern Sea Route (GlavSevMorPut), one of the largest Soviet agencies, governing the Soviet territory north of the Arctic Circle and east of the Ural mountains. In this role, Belakhov oversaw the internal affairs of the agency and the logistics of the Arctic exploration programs.

The agency was at that time headed by Otto Schmidt. Belakhov continued as the political chief under Ivan Papanin, the new chief of CDNSR after Otto Schmidt's resignation from the agency's leadership in 1939.

World War II

In 1940, Belakhov was appointed head of political administration and deputy minister of the Soviet Merchant Fleet. In this capacity, Belakhov was commissioned to manage several key projects, reporting to Anastas Mikoyan, the deputy head of the government and a stalwart of Soviet politics. The projects included the organization of transportation of war aid to the USSR from the U.S. through the Lend-Lease program, supply of fuel and transportation of troops for the Battle of Stalingrad.

== Family ==
Belakhov was married to Maria Belakhova, a writer and educator known for her work in children's literature and education in the Soviet Union, mentorship of many of the country's prominent children's writers, and her own works.
