= Leonid Pilunsky =

Ukrainian politician (1947–2021)

Leonid Petrovych Pilunskyi

Member of the Verkhovna Rada of Crimea
- In office 2006–2014

Personal details
- Born: 15 September 1947 Simferopol, Russian SFSR, Soviet Union
- Died: 21 November 2021 (aged 74) Sevastopol, Crimea
- Party: People's Movement of Ukraine

Leonid Petrovych Pilunskyi (Ukrainian: Леонід Петрович Пілунський; 15 September 1947 – 21 November 2021) was a Ukrainian politician, who served as a member of the Crimean Regional Parlament between 2006 and 2014.

== Early life ==
He was born on 15 September 1947 in the city of Simferopol, which was then part of the Russian SFSR in the Soviet Union. Prior to entering politics, he received a higher education.

== Political career ==
In 1996 he became the leader of the Crimean regional organization for the People's Movement of Ukraine. He served in the Verkhovna Rada of Crimea from 2006 to 2014, when the territory was annexed by Russia. In the Rada for AR Crimea, he served as deputy head of the People's Movement of Ukraine.

On February 21, 2014, during a live interview with the Russian government-affiliated TV channel Russia-24 about the events in Crimea during the Euromaidan, Pilunskyi criticized pro-Yanukovych elements within the ruling Party of Regions, and pointed out that there were no pro-Russian or Anti-Maidan protests in the Autonomous Republic of Crimea, and that only some pro-secessionist lawmakers within local authorities were stirring up tensions. A minute and a half later, the transmission of the interview was suddenly interrupted, and the host, who was seemingly caught by surprise, explained that the interruption was caused by a communication problem. Pilunskyi himself later stated that during the conversation with him, the television crew “simply stopped the interview without explanation”, which in his opinion indicated that Moscow “does not want to hear the truth”.

Pilunskyi spoke out against Russia's annexation of Crimea and subsequently stopped attending parliamentary sessions. After leaving politics in 2014, he focused on his writing career, particularly in writing poetry and a multi-volume literary project about Crimean stories. Later in an interview, he stated he was in self-imposed isolation as he felt on the verge of a mental breakdown after what he observed of other former Crimean deputies "integrating into the Russian occupation system", and called them werewolves. He confirmed he would not return to politics, believing his political style that he called "non-opportunistic" was unneeded in Crimean or Ukrainian politics.

== Personal life and death ==
Pilunsky died on 21 November 2021, in Sevastopol, Crimea, after suffering from COVID-19. He was 74 years old.
