= Leonid Labzov =

Russian ice hockey player

- Born: October 23, 1973 (age 51); Kazan, Russian SFSR, Soviet Union
- Height: 5 ft 11 in (180 cm)
- Weight: 190 lb (86 kg; 13 st 8 lb)
- Position: Defence
- Played for: Neftyanik Almetyevsk; Itil Kazan; Ak Bars Kazan; HC Neftekhimik Nizhnekamsk; Neftyanik Leninogorsk
- Playing career: 1990–2006

Leonid Labzov (born October 23, 1973) is a Russian and Soviet former professional ice hockey defenceman. He is a one-time Russian Champion.

== Awards and honors ==
Award	Year
Russian Superleague
Champion (Ak Bars Kazan)	1998
