= Leonid Bodnarchuk =

Ukrainian scientist

Leonid Ivanovich Bodnarchuk
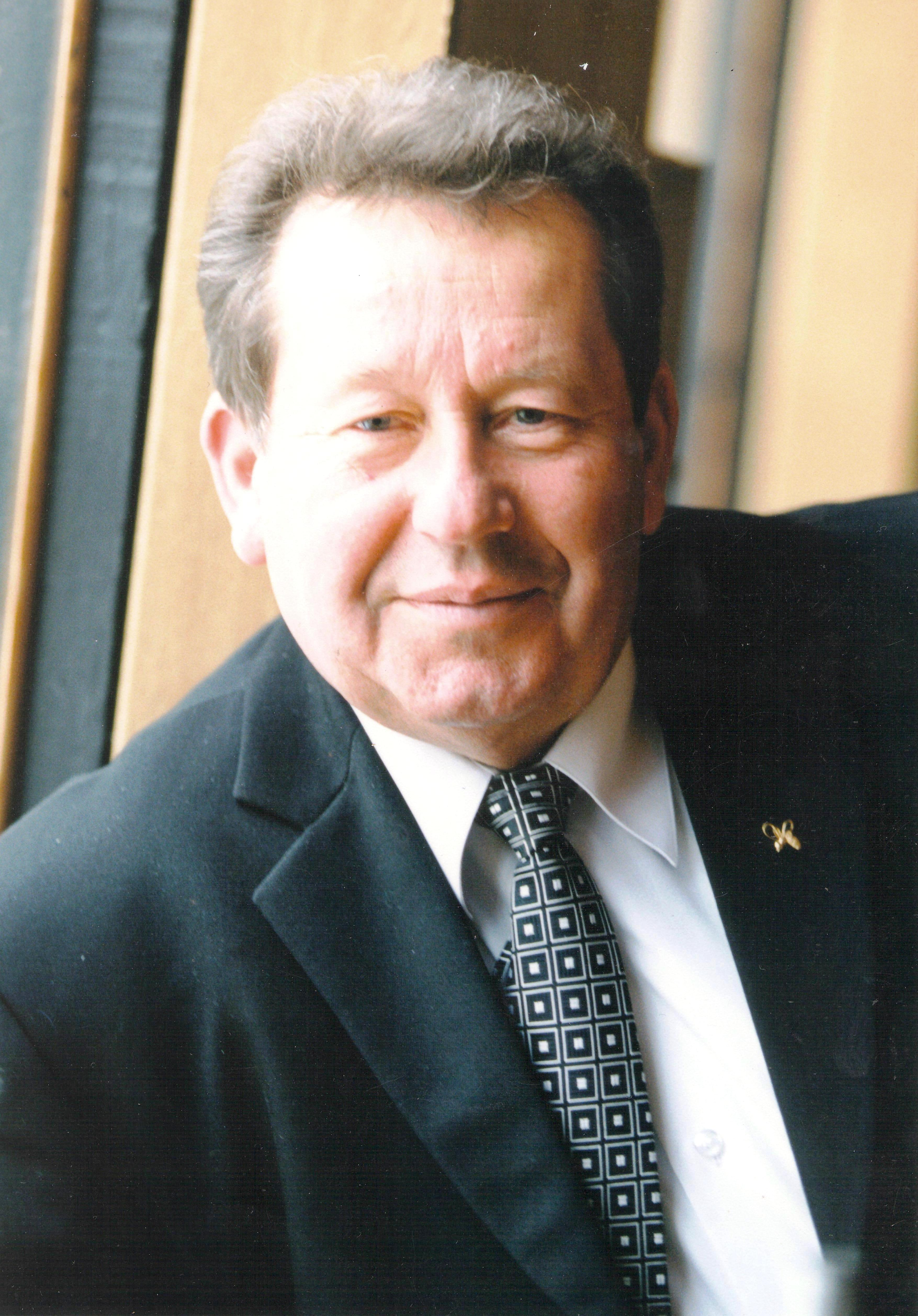
- Born: January 13, 1938
- Died: March 24, 2015 (aged 77)
- Education: National University of Life and Environmental Sciences of Ukraine
- Awards: Order of Merit (Ukraine), three times, 1st, 2nd and 3rd classes (2003, 2008, 2009); Honored Man of agriculture of the Ukraine (1998)
- Scientific career
- Fields: Beekeeping
- Workplaces: P.I. Prokopovych Institute of beekeeping

Leonid Ivanovich Bodnarchuk (Russian: Леонид Иванович Боднарчук; 13 January 1938 – 24 March 2015) was a Ukrainian scientist, Correspondent Member of the National Academy of Agrarian Sciences of Ukraine since 1999. From 1989 to 2012, he was Director of the Ukrainian Research Institute of Apiculture "P.I. Prokopovych Institute of beekeeping". In 1997 he received the title of Professor.

He graduated from the National University of Life and Environmental Sciences of Ukraine in 1961.

In 1974, Bodnarchuk defended his dissertation and earned the degree of Candidate of Biological Sciences in 1975.

From 1974 to 1989 he work at the I. I. Schmalhausen Institute of Zoology.

Since 1997 he was a professor at his alma mater.

Professor Bodnarchuk is the author of 10 monographs and more than 350 articles. He is the author of works about apitherapy.

He was awarded:

- Order of Merit, three times, 1st, 2nd and 3rd classes (2003, 2008, 2009)
- Medal "Veteran of Labour" (1987)
- Honored Man of agriculture of the Ukraine (1998)
