= Asymptotology =

Dealing with applied mathematical systems in limiting cases

Asymptotology has been defined as “the art of dealing with applied mathematical systems in limiting cases” as well as “the science about the synthesis of simplicity and exactness by means of localization".

== Principles ==
The field of asymptotics is normally first encountered in school geometry with the introduction of the asymptote, a line to which a curve tends at infinity. The word Ασύμπτωτος (asymptotos) in Greek means non-coincident and puts strong emphasis on the point that approximation does not turn into coincidence. It is a salient feature of asymptotics, but this property alone does not entirely cover the idea of asymptotics and, etymologically, the term seems to be quite insufficient.

== Perturbation theory, small and large parameters ==
In physics and other fields of science, one frequently comes across problems of an asymptotic nature, such as damping, orbiting, stabilization of a perturbed motion, etc. Their solutions lend themselves to asymptotic analysis (perturbation theory), which is widely used in modern applied mathematics, mechanics and physics. But asymptotic methods put a claim on being more than a part of classical mathematics. K. Friedrichs said: “Asymptotic description is not only a convenient tool in the mathematical analysis of nature, it has some more fundamental significance”. M. Kruskal introduced the special term asymptotology, defined above, and called for a formalization of the accumulated experience to convert the art of asymptotology to a science. A general term is capable of possessing significant heuristic value. In his essay "The Future of Mathematics", H. Poincaré wrote the following.

The invention of a new word will often be sufficient to bring out the relation, and the word will be creative.... It is hardly possible to believe what economy of thought, as Mach used to say, can be effected by a well-chosen term.... Mathematics is the art of giving the same name to different things.... When language has been well chosen, one is astonished to find that all demonstrations made for a known object apply immediately to many new objects: nothing requires to be changed, not even the terms, since the names have become the same.... The bare fact, then, has sometimes no great interest ... it only acquires a value when some more careful thinker perceives the connection it brings out, and symbolizes it by a term.

In addition, “the success of ‘cybernetics’, ‘attractors’ and ‘catastrophe theory’ illustrates the fruitfulness of word creation as scientific research”.

Almost every physical theory, formulated in the most general manner, is rather difficult from a mathematical point of view. Therefore, both at the genesis of the theory and its further development, the simplest limiting cases, which allow analytical solutions, are of particular importance. In those limits, the number of equations usually decreases, their order reduces, nonlinear equations can be replaced by linear ones, the initial system becomes averaged in a certain sense, and so on.

All these idealizations, different as they may seem, increase the degree of symmetry of the mathematical model of the phenomenon under consideration.

== Asymptotic approach ==
In essence, the asymptotic approach to a complex problem consists in treating the insufficiently symmetrical governing system as close to a certain symmetrical one as possible.

In attempting to obtain a better approximation of the exact solution to the given problem, it is crucial that the determination of corrective solutions, which depart from the limit case, be much simpler than directly investigating the governing system. At first sight, the possibilities of such an approach seem restricted to varying the parameters determining the system only within a narrow range. However, experience in the investigation of different physical problems shows that if the system's parameters have changed sufficiently and the system has deviated far from the symmetrical limit case, another limit system, often with less obvious symmetries can be found, to which an asymptotic analysis is also applicable. This allows one to describe the system's behavior on the basis of a small number of limit cases over the whole range of parameter variations. Such an approach corresponds to the maximum level of intuition, promotes further insights, and eventually leads to the formulation of new physical concepts.

It is also important that asymptotic analysis helps to establish the connection between different physical theories. The aim of the asymptotic approach is to simplify the object. This simplification is attained by decreasing the vicinity of the singularity under consideration. It is typical that the accuracy of asymptotic expansions grows with localization. Exactness and simplicity are commonly regarded as mutually exclusive notions. When tending to simplicity, we sacrifice exactness, and trying to achieve exactness, we expect no simplicity. Under localization, however, the antipodes converge; the contradiction is resolved in a synthesis called asymptotics. In other words, simplicity and exactness are coupled by an “uncertainty principle” relation while the domain size serves as a small parameter – a measure of uncertainty.

== Asymptotic uncertainty principle ==
Let us illustrate the “asymptotic uncertainty principle”. Take the expansion of the function $f(x)$ in an asymptotic sequence ${\phi_n(x)}$:
$f(x) = \sum_{n=0}^{\infty} a_n \phi_n(x)$, $x$ → $0$.

A partial sum of the series is designated by $S_N(x)$, and the exactness of approximation at a given $N$ is estimated by $\Delta_N(x) = |f(x) - S_N(x)|$. Simplicity is characterized here by the number $N$ and the locality by the length of interval $x$.

Based on known properties of the asymptotic expansion, we consider the pair wise interrelation of values $x$, $N$, and $\Delta$. At a fixed $x$ the expansion initially converges, i.e., the exactness increases at the cost of simplicity. If we fix $N$, the exactness and the interval size begin to compete. The smaller the interval, the given value of $\Delta$ is reached more simply.

We illustrate these regularities using a simple example. Consider the exponential integral function:
$\operatorname{Ei}(y) = \int_{-\infty}^y e^{\zeta} \zeta^{-1} d{\zeta}, y < 0$.

Integrating by parts, we obtain the following asymptotic expansion
$\operatorname{Ei}(y) \sim e^y \sum_{n=1}^{\infty} (n-1)! y^{-n}, \; y$ → $-\infty$.

Put $f(x) = -e-y \operatorname{Ei}(y)$, $y = -x-1$. Calculating the partial sums of this series and the values $\Delta_N(x)$ and $f(x)$ for different $x$ yields:

 
  
    
      
        x
      
    
    {\displaystyle x}
  
	
  
    
      
        f
        (
        x
        )
      
    
    {\displaystyle f(x)}
  
     
  
    
      
        
          Δ
          
            1
          
        
      
    
    {\displaystyle \Delta _{1}}
  
      
  
    
      
        
          Δ
          
            2
          
        
      
    
    {\displaystyle \Delta _{2}}
  
      
  
    
      
        
          Δ
          
            3
          
        
      
    
    {\displaystyle \Delta _{3}}
  
      
  
    
      
        
          Δ
          
            4
          
        
      
    
    {\displaystyle \Delta _{4}}
  
      
  
    
      
        
          Δ
          
            5
          
        
      
    
    {\displaystyle \Delta _{5}}
  
	
  
    
      
        
          Δ
          
            6
          
        
      
    
    {\displaystyle \Delta _{6}}
  
      
  
    
      
        
          Δ
          
            7
          
        
      
    
    {\displaystyle \Delta _{7}}
  

 1/3	0.262	0.071	0.040	0.034	0.040	0.060	0.106	0.223
 1/5	0.171	0.029	0.011	0.006	0.004	0.0035	0.0040	0.0043
 1/7	0.127	0.016	0.005	0.002	0.001	0.0006	0.0005	0.0004

Thus, at a given $x$, the exactness first increases with the growth of $N$ and then decreases (so one has an asymptotic expansion). For a given $N$, one may observe an improvement of exactness with diminishing $x$.

Finally, is it worth using asymptotic analysis if computers and numerical methods have reached such an advanced state? As D. G. Crighton has mentioned,

Design of computational or experimental schemes without the guidance of asymptotic information is wasteful at best, dangerous at worst, because of the possible failure to identify crucial (stiff) features of the process and their localization in coordinate and parameter space. Moreover, all experience suggests that asymptotic solutions are useful numerically far beyond their nominal range of validity, and can often be used directly, at least at a preliminary product design stage, for example, saving the need for accurate computation until the final design stage where many variables have been restricted to narrow ranges.
