= Odessa Group =

The Odessa Group of exiled and dissident artists take their name from the Ukrainian city of Odesa.

They are:

- Andrey Antoniuk (1943 – 2013)
- Alexander Anufriev (1940-2024)
- Valery Basanietz
- Valentin Khrushch (1943 – 2005)
- Michail Kowalski
- Ruslan Makoev
- Viktor Mariniuk
- Volodymyr Naumez
- Nikolay Novikov (1936 – 199?)
- Evgeni Rakhmanin
- Sergey Savchenko
- Vitaly Sazonov (1947 – 1986)
- Valentin Shapavlenko
- Oleg Sokolov (1919 – 1990)
- Nikolai Stepanov (1937 – 2003)
- Alexander Stovbur (1943 – 2019)
- Vladimir Strelnikov
- Stanislav Sychov (1937 – 2003)
- Vladimir Tzupko
- Alexander Voloshinov
- Ludmilla Yastreb (1945 – 1980)
- Yuri Yegorov (1926 – 2008)
- Vasiliy Sad
