= Alexander Stovbur =

Ukrainian artist (1943–2019)

- Born: May 15, 1943; Omsk
- Died: June 4, 2019 (aged 76); Odesa
- Education: Grekov Odesa Art School
- Known for: painting, graphic
- Movement: abstract art, minimalism
- Awards: Honored Artist of Ukraine

Alexander Stovbur (May 15, 1943, Omsk – June 4, 2019, Odesa) was a Ukrainian artist, known for his abstract minimalism. He was one of the active participants in the Odesa non-conformist movement. Honored Artist of Ukraine.

== Biography ==
Alexander Stovbur was born on May 15, 1943, in Omsk.

In the 1960s in Odesa, the young artists Alexander Anufriev, Vladimir Strelnikov, Valery Basanets, Ludmila Yastreb, Viktor Marinyuk, for the first time in Ukraine, began "non-conformist" traditions of fine art, unacceptable for the prevailing back then aesthetic tastes and views. Artists developed, first of all, their own artistic and aesthetic opposition to art engaged by the state. During his military service in Odesa, Alexander Stovbur becomes close to members of this group. It was during the period when the creative and ideological foundations of the artistic language of Alexander Stovbur began to form.

In 1971 he graduated from the Grekov Odesa Art School. L. Lukin was his teacher of painting.

In 1973 he began exhibition activities, actively taking part in unofficial "apartment" exhibitions held in the apartments-studios of artists. At that time, the circle of like-minded people was spreading and the group, in addition to Alexander Stovbur, was joined by Vladimir Tsyupko, Valentin Khrushch, Stanislav Sychev, Ruslan Makoev, Yevgeny Rakhmanin, Igor Bozhko.

In 1987 the artist became a member of the Union of Artists of the USSR, later the National Union of Artists of Ukraine.

In the 1990s, Sergey Savchenko, Vasily Sad, Nikolai Stepanov joined the group. At first the group performs under the name "Path". In 1992, Alexander Stovbur was one of the founders of the Choven art gallery, and in 1998 – the Mamai creative association.

Since 1991 - an honorary member of the Kyiv-Mohyla Academy.

In 2013, the artist received the title of "Honored Artist of Ukraine".

Alexander Stovbur died on June 4, 2019, in Odesa.

== Exhibitions ==
Alexander Stovbur took part in unofficial "apartment" exhibitions of the 1970s; in the unofficial exhibition “Contemporary Art from Ukraine. Munich – London – New York – Paris ”(1979). Since the late 1980s, he has been taking part in exhibitions of contemporary art in Ukraine and abroad.

== Collections ==
Museums Collections

- National Art Museum of Ukraine (Kyiv, Ukraine)
- National University of Kyiv-Mohyla Academy (Kyiv, Ukraine)
- Odesa Fine Arts Museum (Odesa, Ukraine)
- Museum of Odesa Modern Art (Odesa, Ukraine)
- Ivano-Frankivsk Regional Art Museum (Ivano-Frankivsk, Ukraine)
- Khmelnytskyi Museum of Ukrainian Contemporary Art (Khmelnytskyi, Ukraine)
- Museum of Contemporary Ukrainian Art Korsakiv (Lutsk, Ukraine)

== Prizes ==
- 2010 - Laureate of the first all-Ukrainian triennial of abstract art "ART-ACT"
- 2006 - Laureate of the international art exhibition "High Castle"
- 1993 - Laureate of the International Biennale "Impreza-93" in the category of painting

== Literature ==
- Alexander Stovbur. Color, or the plot of painting / [Author's introduction to the article by V. Savchenko] / Museum provulok № 2 (10), 2008
- Mamai. Painting, graphics, sculpture, ceramics. Exhibition catalog / [Author's article by V. Basanets]. - Odesa, 1999
- Contemporary art in Ukraine. Exhibition of painting - drawings - sculpture. Directory / [Auto Entry Articles and Comp. M. Mudrak]. - Munich; London, New York; Paris, 1979
- Creative association "Mamai". Painting, sculpture. Catalog / [Author's article by R. Yatsiv]. - Odesa, 2002
