= Volodymyr Petrashyk =

Ukrainian art historian, art critic (born 1985)

- Володимир Ігорович Петрашик
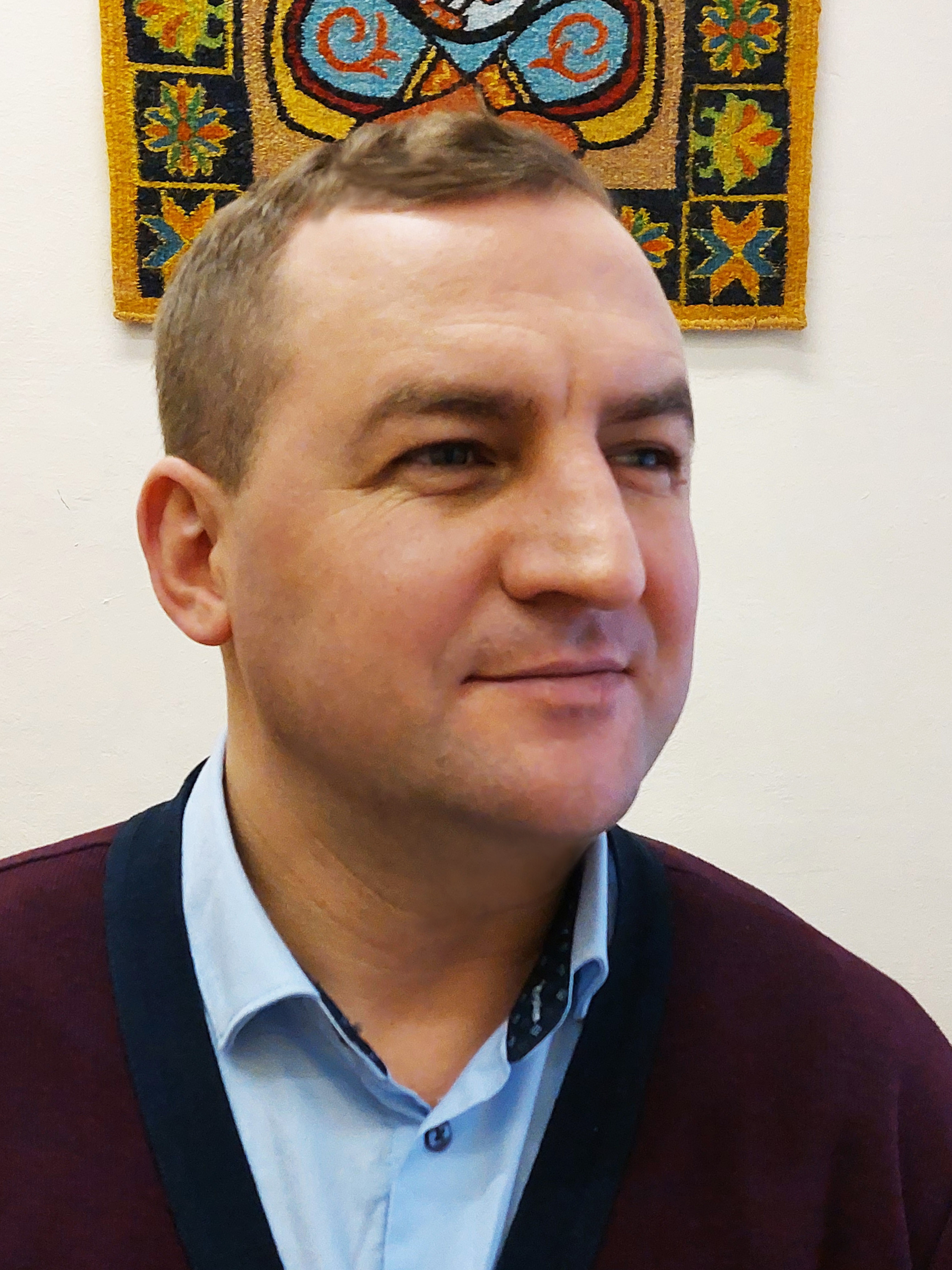
- Born: 25 July 1985 (age 41); Chortkiv, now Ternopil Oblast, Ukraine
- Education: National Academy of Visual Arts and Architecture
- Occupations: Art historian, art critic
- Awards: Merited Figure of Arts of Ukraine

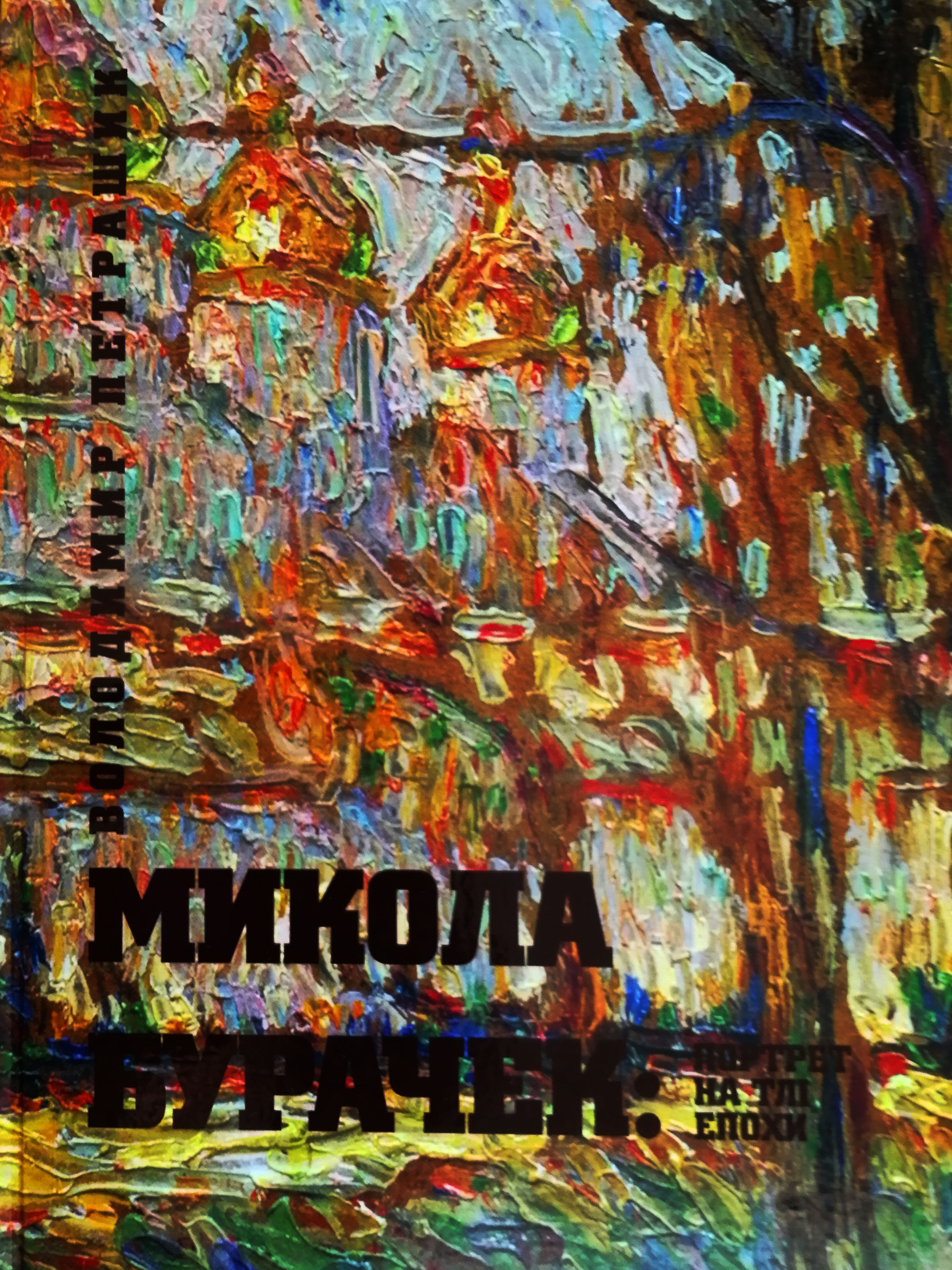
Cover of V. Petrashyk's book "Mykola Burachek: portret na tli epokhy", 2014

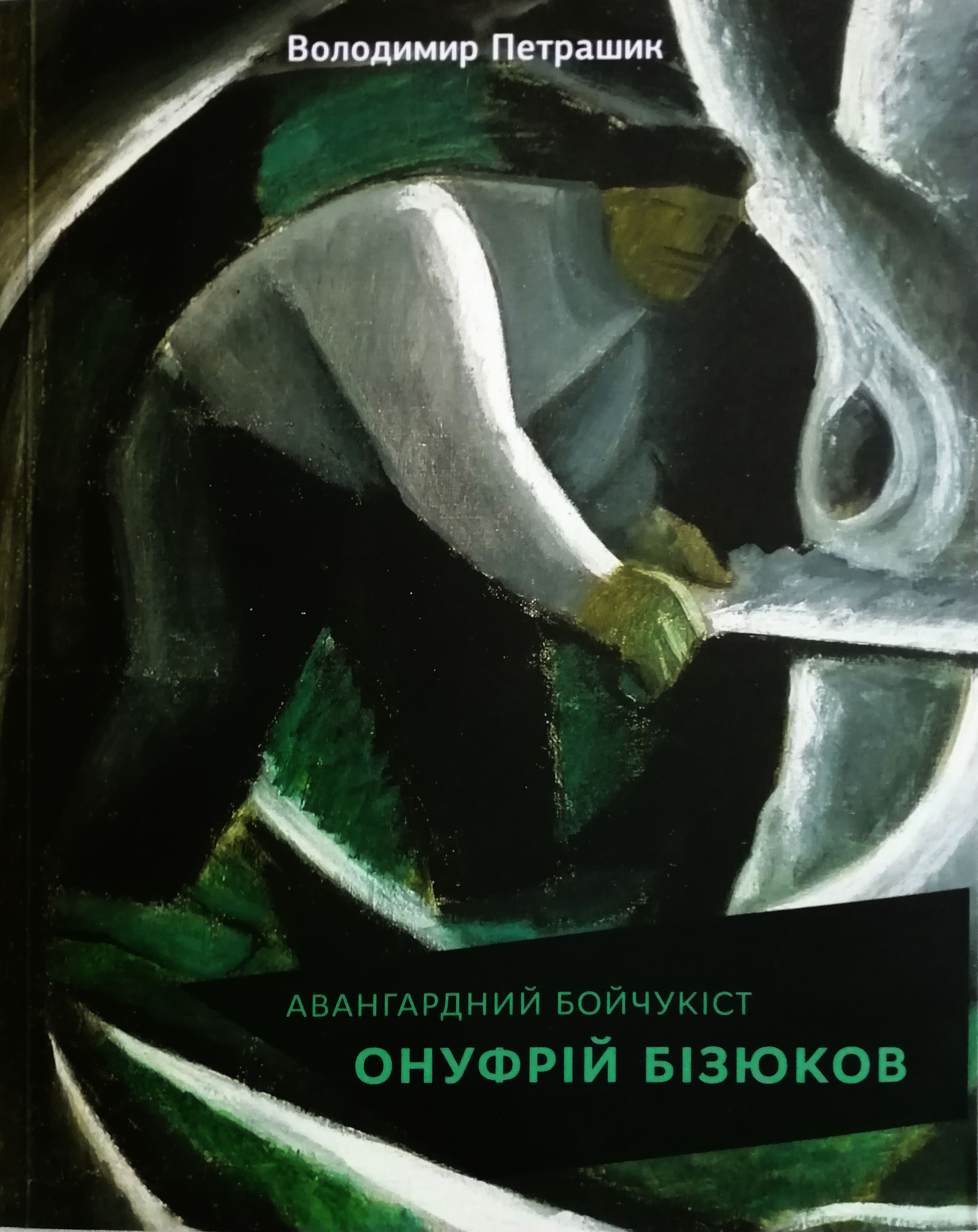
Cover of V. Petrashyk's book "Avanhardnyi boichukist Onufrii Biziukov", 2018

Volodymyr Petrashyk (Ukrainian: Володимир Ігорович Петрашик; born 25 July 1985) is a Ukrainian art historian, art critic, participant in the Russo-Ukrainian War. In 2008, he became a member of the National Union of Artists of Ukraine. From 2012, he has been a candidate of art history, and in 2015, he became an docent.

== Biography ==
Volodymyr Petrashik was born on 25 July 1985 in Chortkiv, Ternopil Oblast (now Ukraine).

In 2008, he graduated from the National Academy of Visual Arts and Architecture in Kyiv, where his teachers were Oleksandr Fedoruk, Volodymyr Mohylevskyi, and Liudmyla Miliaieva. In 2010, he began working at his alma mater, where he has been head of the Department of Art Theory and History from 2022. From 2019 to 2020, he was a senior researcher at the Research Department of the Kyiv National University of Culture and Arts.

In 2006, he began collaborating with the magazine Obrazotvorche Mystetstvo, and in 2020, he was appointed its editor-in-chief. From 2012 to 2015, he was the scientific secretary of the Fine Arts Department of the National Academy of Arts of Ukraine.

In 2022, after the start of the Russian invasion, he joined the defense of the Ukrainian state.

== Works ==
Author of a number of scientific and popular science publications, articles in the Encyclopedia of Modern Ukraine.

Petrashyk's oeuvre includes a gallery of creative portraits of artists Valentyna Vyrodova-Hotie, Yakiv Hnizdovskyi, Oleh Holosii, Taras Danylych, Viktor Maryniuk, Heorhii Narbut, Dmytro Paruta, Serhii Riepka, Stepan Riabchenko, Yurii Skandakov, Mykola Storozhenko, Okhrim Sudomora, Oleh Tistol, Oleksandr Khrapachov, and Volodymyr Tsiupko.

Monographs:

- Mykola Burachek: portret na tli epokhy (Kyiv, 2014)
- Avanhardnyi boichukist Onufrii Biziukov (Kyiv, 2018)

His scientific interests include little-known pages of Ukrainian art history, its regional schools, the specifics of genres, and the work of set designers, illustrators, and easel painters.

== Awards ==
- Prize of the XXI International Festival Napoli Cultural Classic, publishing section, Marigliano, Italy (2021).
- Laureate of the Platon Biletskyi Prize of the Kyiv Regional Organization of the National Union of Artists of Ukraine in 2024.
- Medal For sacrifice and love of Ukraine of the Orthodox Church of Ukraine from the Head of the Orthodox Church of Ukraine, Metropolitan Epiphanius of Kyiv, dated 14 September 2024.
- Medal For Military Service to Ukraine - for personal courage in defending the state sovereignty and territorial integrity of Ukraine, selfless performance of military duty, dated 1 November 2024.
- Award from the Presidium of the National Academy of Arts of Ukraine for significant contribution to Ukrainian art science and its popularization, dated 30 January 2025.
- War Veteran Badge (Україна) (2025)
- Merited Figure of Arts of Ukraine (2025)
