= NT-Art Gallery =

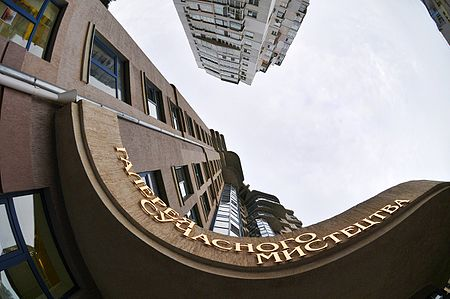
- NT-Art Gallery
- Established: 2007
- Location: Odesa, Ukraine
- Director: Anatoliy V. Dymchuk
- Public transit access: Lidersovskyy Boulevard
- Website: nt-art.net

Non-commercial NT-Art Gallery was opened by Anatoliy Dymchuk in Odesa on December 20, 2007, based on the collection of more than 3,000 paintings, drawings, sculptures, photographs and installations from the 1950s to the present day. Diversity is the key theme of the collection. It includes several collections within the collection.

== Collections within the collection ==
• The largest and the most generically diverse collection features works by the leader of the Odesa painting school Yuriy Yegorov.

• One of the largest collections of works by Odesa nonconformist (underground) artists (Oleksander Anufriev, Volodymyr Strelnikov, Valeriy Basanets, Viktor Marinjuk, Lyudmyla Yastreb, Volodymyr Naumets, Valentin Khrushch, Stanislav Sychov, Oleg Voloshinov, Yeugene Rakhmanin, Ruslan Makoyev, Oleksander Stovbur, Volodymyr Tsjupko, Sergey Savchenko, Vasyl’ Sad), who were the first in Ukraine to flag the way to informal art, free from ideological pressure and biased aesthetics, in the 1970s. The collection includes artworks collected by F. Kokhrykht, V. Arsiyev, M. Knobel, and those bought from the artists. It features both works from the 1960s–1980s, originally presented at apartment exhibitions, and later artworks.

• Impressionist paintings of contemporary successors of the Southern Russian School of the late 19th century like Konstantin Lomykin, Mykola Sheljuto, Albin Gavdzinskiy, Volodymyr Litvinenko, Orest Sleshinskiy, Adolf Loza, and Viktor Zhurakovskiy.

• Contemporary Ukrainian art from the 1990s to the present day (Olexandr Gnylyts'kiy, Arsen Savadov, Vasyl’ Tsagolov, Igor Gusev, Illya Chichkan, Oleksander Roytburd, Maksym Mamsikov, Oleg Tistol, Volodymyr Kozhuhar, Yuriy Solomko, Mykola Matsenko, Les’ Podervyanskyi, Larysa Trubina, Sergiy Zarva, Artem Volokitin, Zhanna Kadyrova, etc.).

== Activities gallery ==
The collection also features a number of works of the Transcarpathian school of painting (Yosyp Bokshay, Adalbert Erdeli, Andriy Kotska, Zoltan Sholtes, Adalbert Boretskyi, Ernest Kontratovych), Lviv school of painting (Roman Selskyi, Karlo Zvirynskyi, Zenoviy Flinta), Soviet socialist realism, and Odesa conceptualism. The gallery regularly lends its work for exhibitions, particularly, to the National Art Museum of Ukraine, Odesa Museum of Contemporary Art, and Art Arsenal.

The gallery does not have the status of a museum. However, as some authoritative experts claim, a large part of its collection is worth being exhibited at museums and is not intended for sale.

Works from the collection were published in such editions as Odesa Modernists, Ukrainian Art of the Sixties, Focus on the Ground, and Modern Ukrainian art. Portraits of the artists.

NT-Art organized some large-scale group exhibitions that brought together more than 40 Ukrainian artists. These are “RESTART ODESA”, “RESTART KYIV”, “Star Wars”, “Save the President”, and “Odesa School. Traditions and Actuality” (Donetsk, Kyiv, Dnipro).

NT-Art Gallery is also involved in publishing. Over the past years, more than 30 catalogues, books, and poetry collections were published, including Hypostasis novel by Bondero, as well as catalogues to “Bebel str. 19. Apartment Exhibitions" and “RESTART” exhibitions.

NT-Art Gallery is the center of Odesa art life as it hosts not only exhibitions, but also poetry readings, concerts, book presentations, and lectures.

== See also ==
- Dymchuk Gallery
- Yuriy N.Yegorov
- Anatoliy V. Dymchuk
