= Valentin Khrushch =

Ukrainian artist (1943–2005)

- Валентин Хрущ
- Valentin Khrushch
- Born: Валентин Дмитрович Хрущ; January 24, 1943; Odesa
- Died: October 24, 2005 (aged 62); Kimry
- Occupation: Artist
- Known for: painting, graphic, sculpture, photography
- Style: Expressionism, abstract art
- Movement: Nonconformism, modernism

Valentin Khrushch (Ukrainian: Валентин Дмитрович Хрущ, romanized: Valentyn Dmytrovych KhrushchJanuary 24, 1943, Odesa – October 24, 2005, Kimry, Tver region) was a Ukrainian artist, one of the central figures of the Odesa school of unofficial art.

== Biography ==
Valentin Khrushch was born on January 24, 1943, in occupied Odesa. In the 1950s he studied at the Odesa Art School (teachers Zaitsev, Yegorov, Pavlyuk, Fraerman).

Valentin Khrushch was one of the key figures in non-conformist and underground art in Odesa, and then in Moscow, which was developing in the 1960s and 1970s. He was the main organizer of the so-called open-air exhibitions — works were hanging on fences along the streets. The "Fence Exhibition" organized by artists Valentin Khrushch and Stanislav Sychev in 1967 "Sychik + Hrushchik" on the Odesa Opera Theater fence became the starting point for "Odesa nonconformism". This exhibition lasted only three hours.

Later the artist became the central catalyst in Odesa and Moscow behind the "apartment exhibitions", shows of unofficial artists that took place in people's homes. Since the late 1970s, name of Valentin Khrushch, as well as his colleagues of the "Odesa nonconformism" Alexander Anufriev, Vladimir Strelnikov, Lyudmila Yastreb, Victor Marinyuk, Stanislav Sychov, Valeriy Basanets began to appear in foreign catalogs and exhibitions. In 1979 he participated in the unofficial exhibition "Contemporary Art from Ukraine" (Munich-London-Paris-New York).

In 1982, Valentin Khrushch moved from Odesa to Moscow. He has exhibited in Paris at UNESCO.

Last years, Valentin Khrushch spent in Kimry, Tver region, where he died from cancer on January 24, 2005. He was buried there in the St. Nicholas Church fence.

== Сollections ==
Works by Valentin Khrushch are in the permanent exhibition of UNESCO in Paris, the National Museum of Vienna (Austria), National Art Museum of Ukraine, Odesa Fine Arts Museum, Museum of Odesa Modern Art, Odesa Literary Museum, NT-Art Gallery (Odesa, Ukraine), Grynov Art Collection, the Kimry Local History Museum and the Zimmerli Art Museum (New Jersey, USA).
