= Mykola Marychevskyi =

Ukrainian art historian (1961–2005)

- Микола Миколайович Маричевський
- Born: 26 February 1961; Kaharlyk, Kyiv Oblast
- Died: 18 October 2005 (aged 44); Kyiv
- Education: Taras Shevchenko National University of Kyiv
- Occupations: Journalist, publicist, art historian, editor, publisher

Mykola Marychevskyi (Ukrainian: Микола Миколайович Маричевський; 26 February 1961 – 18 October 2005) was a Ukrainian journalist, publicist, art historian, editor, publisher.

== Biography ==
Born on 26 February 1961 in Kaharlyk, Kyiv Oblast.

In 1985, he graduated from the Faculty of Journalism at Taras Shevchenko National University of Kyiv. He served as the Editor-in-Chief of the magazine Obrazotvorche Mystetstvo from November 1990, the almanac Artaniia (from 1995), and the newspaper Mystets (from 1997).

He was an active member of several professional unions: the National Union of Artists of Ukraine (a member from 1984, where he also served as Secretary and Deputy Chairman), the National Union of Journalists of Ukraine (from 1984), and the National Writers' Union of Ukraine (from 1997).

In 1992, on Marychevskyi initiative and with his direct participation, the first art association, the "National Association of Artists", was organized. This association sponsored three All-Ukrainian exhibitions of contemporary art – "Khutir I," "Khutir II," and "Khutir III" – held in Kyiv, Lviv, and Khmelnytskyi.

He died on 18 October 2005, in Kyiv.

== Creative achievements ==
During his career, he prepared 55 issues of Obrazotvorche Mystetstvo for publication, 6 books of the Artaniia almanac, and approximately 100 art albums, books, and catalogues. He was the editor and publisher of two multi-volume series:

- "Nash Chas – Nash Prostir" – monographic albums about the work of outstanding Ukrainian artists Roman Selskyi, Volodymyr Patyk, Mykola Maksymenko, Maria Prymachenko, Andrii Antoniuk, Vasyl Yarych, Borys Buriak, Mykhailo Demtsiu, Roman Romanyshyn, Volodymyr Yemets, Liubomyr Yaremchuk, Mykola Mazur, Yevhen Leshchenko, Viktor Hontariv, Petro Pechornyi, and Oleksandr Sadovskyi.
- "Skryzhali dukhu" (about the work of Ukrainian artists outside their homeland) — Aka Pereima, Oleksa Bulavitska, Anatolii Kolomiets, Lidiia Bodnar-Balahutrak.

Catalog editor:

- 1999 — "Danylo Narbut";
- 2000 — "Emma Andiievska", "Mykola Bidniak";
- 2002 — "Yevhen Manyshyn", "Kamynnyi Tsvit Luhanskoi Zemli", "Valentyn Altanets", "Dmytro Paruta";
- 2003 — "Taras Danylych";
- 2004 — "Oleksandr Filbert", "Rodyna Pryimachenkiv", "Andrii Bulanyi";
- 2006 — "Dmytro Syrovatka".

Editor and compiler of the book "Alla Horska: Chervona tin kalyny: lysty, spohady, statti" (1996).

Compiler and author of the foreword to the album "Volodymyr Chupryna" (1995).

== Family ==
His wife, Alla Volodymyrivna Marychevska (born 1963), is a philologist, teacher, and editor-in-chief of the magazine Artania. They had two daughters, Oksana and Olena.

== Bibliography ==
- Маричевська Оксана. Простір і час Миколи Маричевського // Obrazotvorche Mystetstvo. — 2010-2011. — № 4-1. — С. 118-119.
- Медвідь В'ячеслав. Спомин: мистецька бутність Миколи Маричевського // Артанія. — 2011. — № 1. — С. 94-99.
- Пам'яті Миколи Маричевського // Образотворче мистецтво. — 2005. — № 4. — С. 2-5.
- Хоменко Олександр. Двоє в розширеному просторі // Артанія. — 2011. — № 1. — С. 102-104.
