= Volodymyr Hurin =

Contemporary Ukrainian impressionist artist

Volodymyr Vasylovich Hurin (Ukrainian: Володимир Васильович Гу́рін) (born February 6, 1964) is a Ukrainian artist and pedagogue who has exhibited domestically and internationally since 1988.

== Biography ==
Volodymyr Hurin was born in the settlement of Moshchun in Bucha Raion, the son of People's Artist of Ukraine, Vasyl' Hurin (1939–2018). Volodymyr matriculated at the Kyiv Art Institute (National Academy of Visual Arts and Architecture) and there he received his tertiary education, graduating in the year 1990.

His father, Vasyl' Hurin, belonged to a generation of artists known as the '1960-iers', who repudiated the constraints of Socialist Realism and embraced individual expression, nonconformism and the revival of the repressed national style Like Volodymyr, Vasyl' Hurin graduated from the Kyiv Institute of Arts in 1958, and came under the tutelage of Karpo Trokhymenko, Leonid Chychkan, and Mykola Storozhenko.

== Artistic Career & Oeuvre ==
Hurin's body of works extends across landscape, portraiture and still life. Exposed to the classical tradition of painting from a young age, Hurin is a representative of the Kyiv school of painting 'en plain air', initiated by Ukrainian masters such as Mykola Pymonenko and Vasyl Krychevsky. Hurin's artistic lyricism, movement and dexterous brushstrokes are reminiscent of the Impressionism movement.

In 2019 an immersive multimedia exhibition combining Hurin's work with the compositions of Volodymyr Mashika was held. The compositions of Uzhhorod Music College graduate, Mashika, were performed by Hurin's daughter, Maria.

== Works ==
Notable paintings by Volodymyr Hurin include:

- In the Carpathians (1987)
- Noon (1997)
- Carpathian Motif (1998)
- Poltava Women (1999)
- On the Bank of the Psel River (1999)
- Bakhchisarai (2004)
- Balaclava (2004)
- Sunflowers (2005)
- Kyiv Motives (1990–2003)
- Herbarium of Feelings (1992–1999).
