= Sergey Savchenko =

Ukrainian artist

- Born: 25 August 1949 (age 76); Odesa
- Education: Grekov Odesa Art School
- Movement: Abstract expressionism
- Awards: Honored Artist of Ukraine

Sergey Savchenko (born August 25, 1949) is a Ukrainian artist, a representative of abstract expressionism. He works in the field of painting, graphics, sculpture and monumental art and is a Member of the Odesa nonconformist movement. Savchenko is a recipient of Honored Artist of Ukraine award.

== Biography ==
Serhiy Savchenko was born on August 25, 1949, in Odesa.

He received his art education at the Grekov Odesa Art School from 1969 to 1974. His teacher of painting was Adolf Loza.

He began his creative activity in the 1970s, exhibition one in 1976. In the early 1980s he joined the group of Odesa nonconformists. Since the late 1980s he has been participating in exhibitions of contemporary art in Ukraine and abroad.

In 1988 the artist became a member of the Artists' Union of the USSR, later the National Union of Artists of Ukraine.

Savchenko is one of the founders of the National Association of Artists (1993), creative association "Boat" (1992) and creative association "Mamay" (1998), honorary member of the National University of Kyiv-Mohyla Academy, Honored Artist of Ukraine (2009), member of the Shevchenko National Prize Committee of Ukraine (2016–2019).

Lives and works in Odesa.

== Work ==
Abstraction has the opportunity to enter the emotional space in which pure subtle energies roar, and art appears as a reflection, as it should be, clear and revealed at the level of impulsive entry into the image on the verge of possible insight.

- Sergey Savchenko, artist

== Collections ==
Museums collections

- National Art Museum of Ukraine (Kyiv, Ukraine)
- National University of Kyiv-Mohyla Academy (Kyiv, Ukraine)
- Museum of Modern Art of Ukraine (Kyiv, Ukraine)
- Odesa Art Museum (Odesa, Ukraine)
- Museum of Odesa Modern Art (Odesa, Ukraine)
- Ivano-Frankivsk Regional Art Museum (Ivano-Frankivsk, Ukraine)
- Khmelnytskyi Museum of Ukrainian Contemporary Art (Khmelnytskyi, Ukraine)
- Kaniv Museum of Taras Shevchenko (Kaniv, Ukraine)
- Lviv Art Palace (Lviv, Ukraine)
- Korsak's Museum of Ukrainian Modern Art (Lutsk, Ukraine)
- Novosibirsk Art Museum (Novosibirsk, Russia)
- Ukrainian Institute of Modern Art (Chicago, US)

== Awards ==
- 2002 - International Biennial of Contemporary Graphics (Novosibirsk, Russia)
- 1989 - Laureate of the UAZIS Award (Ukrainian Association for the Protection of the Historical Environment), Impreza International Biennale (Ivano-Frankivsk, Ukraine)
