= Oleksandr Fedoruk =

Ukrainian art historian (1938–2025)

- Олександр Касіянович Федорук
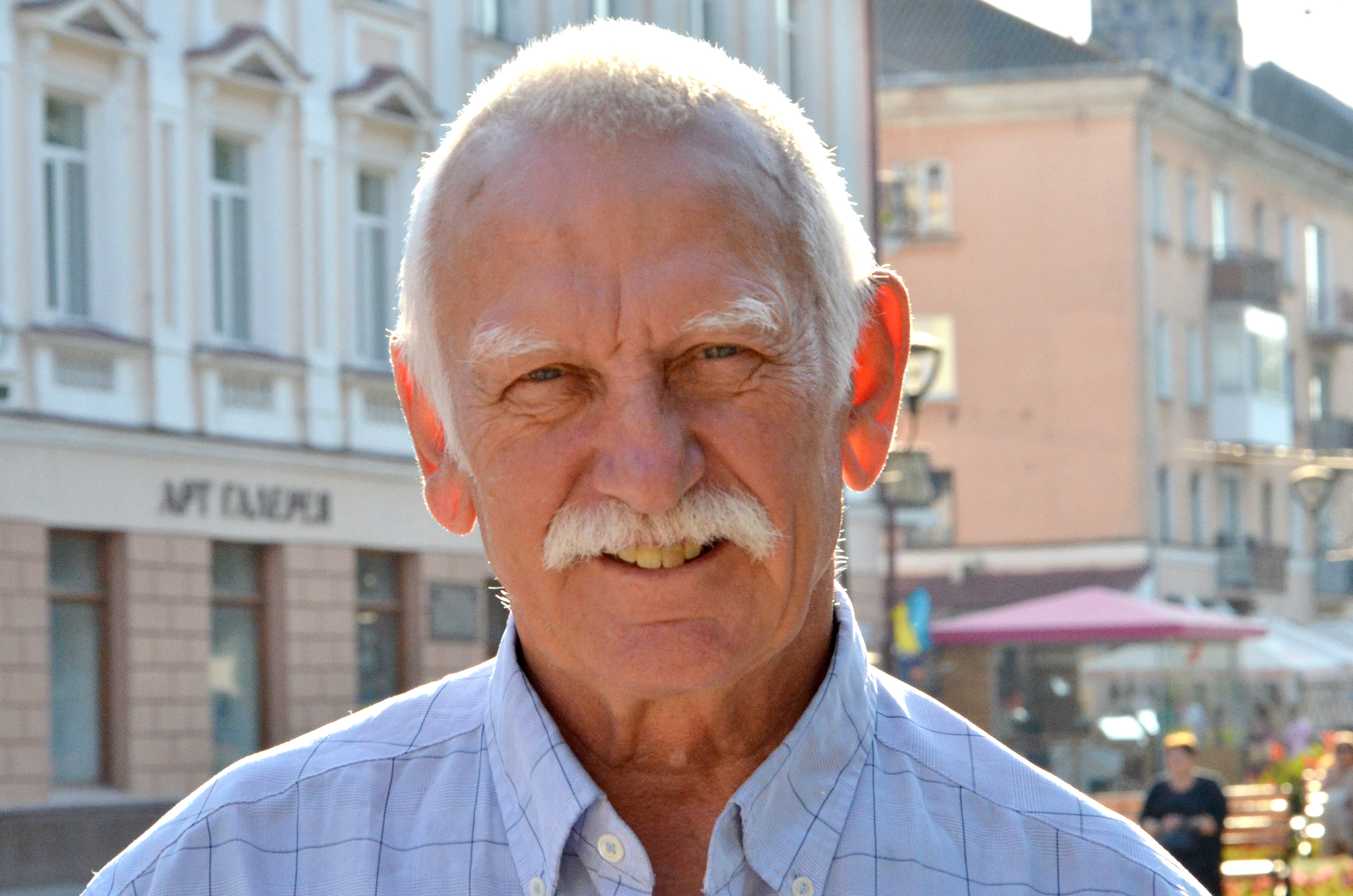
- Oleksandr Fedoruk in Ternopil on 26 August 2016.
- Born: 27 September 1938; Méricourt, France
- Died: 1 June 2025 (aged 86); Kyiv, Ukraine
- Education: University of Lviv
- Occupation: Art historian
- Awards: Order of Prince Yaroslav the Wise, 5th degree

Oleksandr Fedoruk (Ukrainian: Олександр Касіянович Федорук; 27 September 1938, Méricourt – 1 June 2025, Kyiv) was a Ukrainian art historian. Member of the National Union of Journalists of Ukraine, the National Union of Artists of Ukraine (1978), and the National Union of Masters of Folk Art of Ukraine (1990). He served as the Head of the All-Ukrainian Branch of the International Association of Art Critics (1996). He was a Meritorious Activist of Culture of Poland (1977) and a Merited Figure of Arts of Ukraine (2003). He held a Doctor of Arts degree (1996) and the title of Professor (2004). He was an Academician (2000) and a Corresponding Member (1997) of the National Academy of Arts of Ukraine.

== Biography ==
He was born into a family of Ukrainian and Polish emigrants in France, in the town of Méricourt in the Pas-de-Calais department. His father, Kasian Fedoruk (1906–1972), left for France in the spring of 1929 and worked as a miner. He was born in the village of Koshliaky, Zbarazh Powiat. His mother, Olena (née Levandovska) (1911–2002), left for France in 1936. She was born in the village of Potok Wielki near Lublin. They married on 2 April 1937.

In 1945, he started school in France. At the end of 1947, the family moved to Ukraine. From Odesa, the family was sent to Donbas, where Kasian worked in a mine near Yenakiieve. They experienced famine. After half a year of living in Donbas, the family moved to the village of Koshliaky, where Oleksandr continued his schooling.

In 1950, Kasian left the village for work in Ternopil, where he soon moved his family. In the same year, Oleksandr entered the sixth grade of Ternopil Secondary School No. 6 and also studied at a music school (violin).

From 1955 to 1960, he studied at the Faculty of Journalism of Ivan Franko University of Lviv. In September 1958, as a student, he worked on virgin lands to help his parents.

From 1960 to 1962, he served as the head of the letters department in a Raion newspaper in the village of Velykyi Hlybochok, Ternopil Raion.

From 1964, he worked as a literary staff member at the editorial office of the Uzhhorod newspaper "Zakarpatska Pravda".

From 1964 to 1966, he was the deputy responsible secretary of the editorial office of the Ternopil Oblast newspaper "Vilne Zhyttia". From 1966 to 1968, he was the head of the student and school youth department of the Ternopil newspaper "Rovesnyk".

From 1971 to 2005, he worked at the Rylsky Institute of Art Studies, Folklore and Ethnology (starting 1971, as acting junior researcher in the fine arts department; from 1974, as a junior researcher in the same department; from 1974, as the academic secretary of the institute; from 1982, as the head of the socialist countries art sector; from 1987, as the deputy director of the Institute for scientific work (part-time from 1992 to 1993); and from 1993 to 2005, as the head of the department of art and folk art of foreign countries (part-time)). On 1978, he was awarded the academic title of senior researcher. He was the secretary and a board member of the National Union of Artists of Ukraine.

From 1991, he was a member of the National Commission for UNESCO Affairs. From 1992, he served as the deputy head of the Collegium for Humanitarian Policy of the State Duma of Ukraine.

From 1992 to 2000, he was the head of the National Commission on the Return of Cultural Values to Ukraine.

From 1995 to 2001, he was a member of the Commission on the Restoration of Outstanding Historical and Cultural Monuments under the President of Ukraine.

From 1997 to 1998, he was the deputy head of the Council for the Preservation of National Cultural Heritage under the President of Ukraine.

From 2000 to 2004, he was the head of the State Service for Control over the Movement of Cultural Values across the State Border.

From 2001 to 2010, he was a member of the committee for the Taras Shevchenko National Prize of Ukraine (by decrees on the composition of the Shevchenko Committee from 2001 – chairman Ivan Dziuba; 2005 – chairman Roman Lubkivskyi; 2008 – chairman Mykola Zhulynskyi). From 2004 to 2017, he served as the head of the Department of Theory and History of Arts at the National Academy of Visual Arts and Architecture.

From early 2005, he was a freelance advisor to the Minister of Culture and Arts of Ukraine.

From 2006 to 2019, he was the editor-in-chief of the magazine "Obrazotvorche Mystetstvo".

From 2018 to 2020, he was the chief researcher at the Institute of Contemporary Art of the National Academy of Arts of Ukraine.

From March 2020 to 2022, he was a professor at the Department of Art History Expertise of the Institute of Practical Culturology and Art Management of the National Academy of Government Managerial Staff of Culture and Arts; from 2020, he was the head of this department.

From 2023 to 2025, he was the chief researcher at the Institute of Contemporary Art of the National Academy of Arts of Ukraine.

Author of academic publications, monographs, and other editions.

He died on 1 June 2025. He was buried in the Petropavlivska Borshchahivka cemetery.

== Awards ==
- 1977 — Meritorious Activist of Culture of Poland.
- 1988 — Oleksandr Biletskyi Prize.
- 1993 — Olena Pchilka Prize.
- 2002 — Honorary Award of the Ukrainian Culture Foundation "For Endeavor in Culture".
- 2003 — Merited Figure of Arts of Ukraine.
- 2004 — Honorary Diploma of the Verkhovna Rada of Ukraine.
- 2004 — Gold Medal of the National Academy of Arts of Ukraine.
- 2007 — Art Prize in Hajdúszoboszló (Hungary).
- 2007 — Oleksandr Osmiorkin Prize.
- 2009 — Order of Prince Yaroslav the Wise, 5th class.
- 2010 — Award of the Ministry of Culture and Tourism of Ukraine "For Many Years of Fruitful Work in the Field of Culture".
- 2019 — Full Member of the Shevchenko Scientific Society in Lviv.
- 2021 — National Union of Journalists of Ukraine Medal "For Creative Achievements".
- 2021 — Paisius Velichkovsky Prime of the OCU.
- 2024 — Award of the Public National Prize "Skarb Natsii" — "For Responsible Parenthood".

== Bibliography ==
- Мистецтво України : Біографічний довідник. / упоряд.: А. В. Кудрицький, М. Г. Лабінський ; за ред. А. В. Кудрицького. — Київ : «Українська енциклопедія» імені М. П. Бажана, 1997. — С. 700 с. . — ISBN 5-88500-071-9. — С. 602–603.
- (in Ukrainian) Дуда І., Ханас В., Федорук Олександр Касянович // Ternopil Encyclopedic Dictionary: in 4 v. / editorial board: H. Yavorskyi and other, Ternopil: "Zbruch", 2008, V. 3: П—Я, S. 513. — ISBN 978-966-528-279-2.
- Федорук Олександр Касіянович: Біобібліографічний покажчик / Упоряд. Я. Федорук, В. Ханко; перед. сл. В. Сидоренка; вступ. ст. В. Ханка. — К., 2010. —126 с.
- Державний архів Тернопільської області, фонд Р–3452: «Федорук Олександр Касянович (1939) — мистецтвознавець».
- Центральний державний архів-музей літератури і мистецтва України, фонд 1302: «Федорук Олександр Касьянович (1939 р.н.) мистецтвознавець і громадсько-культурний діяч».
