= Potocki Palace, Ivano-Frankivsk =

Former palace in Ukraine

Coordinates: 48.9244°N 24.7134°E

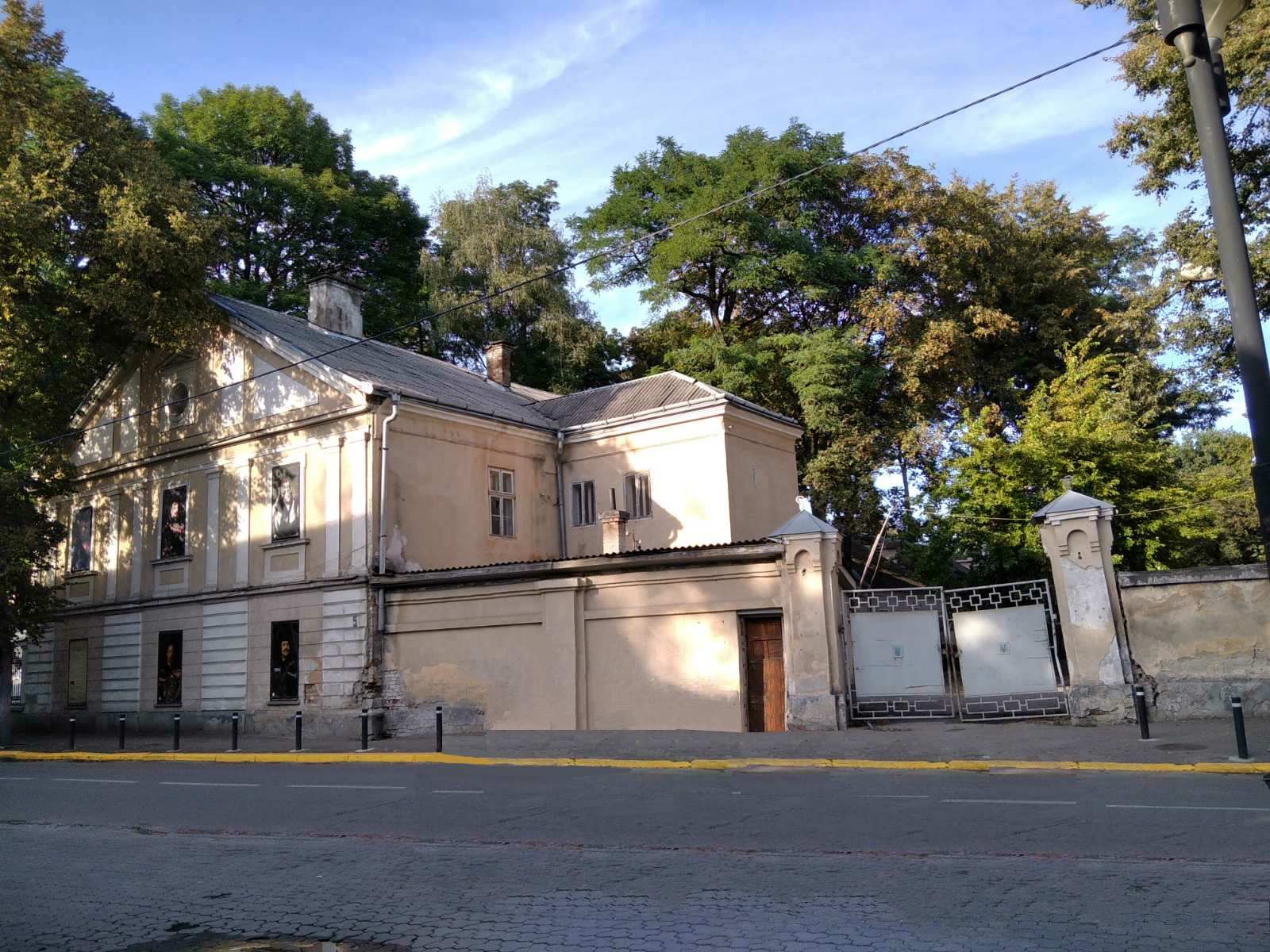
Front side the palace

Potocki Palace is a former residence of the Potocki family in the Ukrainian city of Ivano-Frankivsk, formerly known as Stanislaviv (Polish: Stanisławów). The palace was erected by the city's founder Andrzej Potocki and later served as a military hospital. Since 2024 a museum has been functioning on its premises.

== History ==
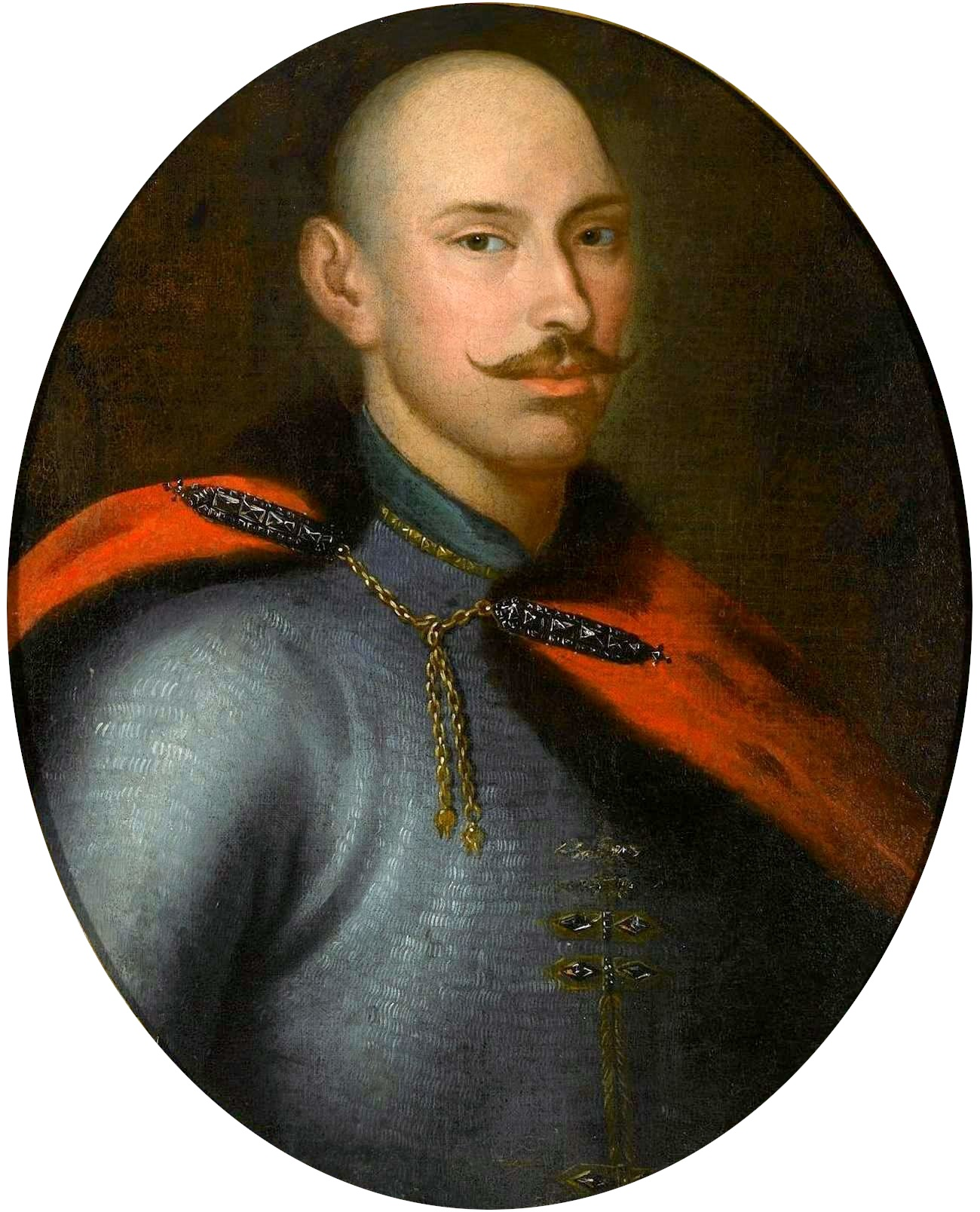
Portrait of Andrzej Potocki (d. 1691)

The palace, initially a wooden structure, was established in 1672 by future Crown hetman Andrzej Potocki and functioned as part of the fortifications of the newly established fortress of Stanisławów. In 1682 a new stone palace was constructed. It was separated from the city with a wall and a moat. The palace functioned as a residence of the Potocki family, and guests who were at different times received there included king Jan Sobieski, Transylvanian ruler Francis II Rakoczi, the wife and daughters of hetman Pylyp Orlyk, as well as Austrian emperor Franz Joseph I.

After the last owner of the palace from the Potocki family went bankrupt in 1801, the structure along with the whole city became property of the Austrian monarchy. The palace's fortifications were dismantled, and the building itself started functioning as a military hospital, preserving that role until 2004. During that time most decorative elements were removed, and in modern days the three-story main edifice of the palace looks more or less like a regular building.

Between 2004 and 2017 the palace was privately owned, and during that time the structure suffered significant damage due to disuse and lack of heating. Since 2017 the building has been part of the municipal property and is currently undergoing renovation. In 2024 remains of the original palace wall were discovered by archaeologists. The only part of the palace which has been fully restored is the 19th century entrance gate. Parts of the palace complex currently house a multimedia museum exhibition, a congress hall, a sound studio and an analogue photo laboratory.

== Architecture ==
Originally, the palace was planned to have three wings, but only one was built, meanwhile the other two parts had solely their foundations erected. No historical plan or visual depiction of the original palace has been found. In the 18th century the structure was described as having six rooms, a round staircase, a big hall with wooden floors and two glazed doors providing access to the defensive wall, several bedrooms and wardrobes, a coffee room and a residential space. The walls of the rooms were covered with textiles and wooden panels, and the white double doors were decorated with gilded leaves. The floors were made of oak wood and there was a fireplace in the palace. Currently nine structures from the palace and later hospital complex have been preserved.

== Gallery ==
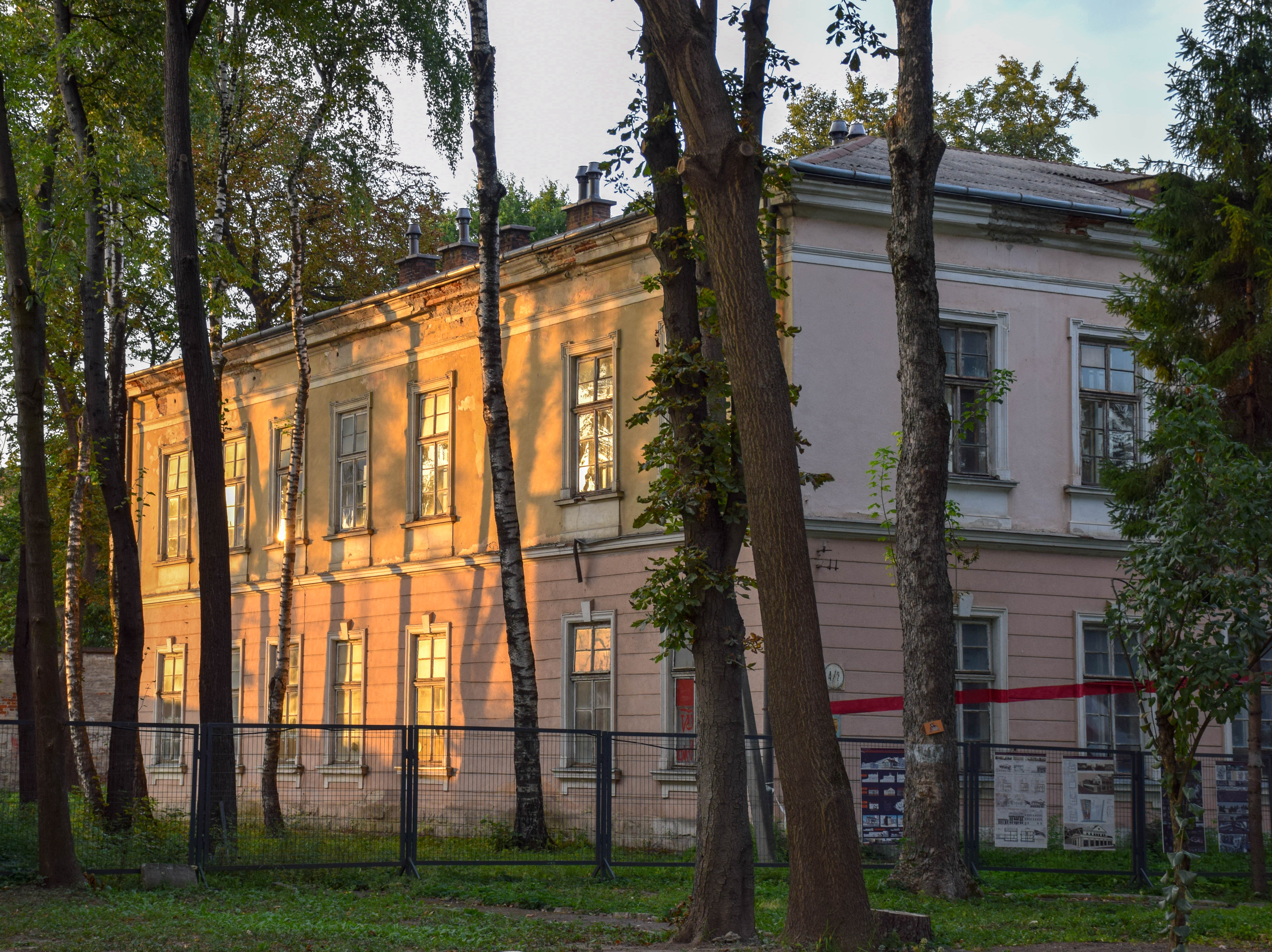
Main palace building as seen from the nearby park

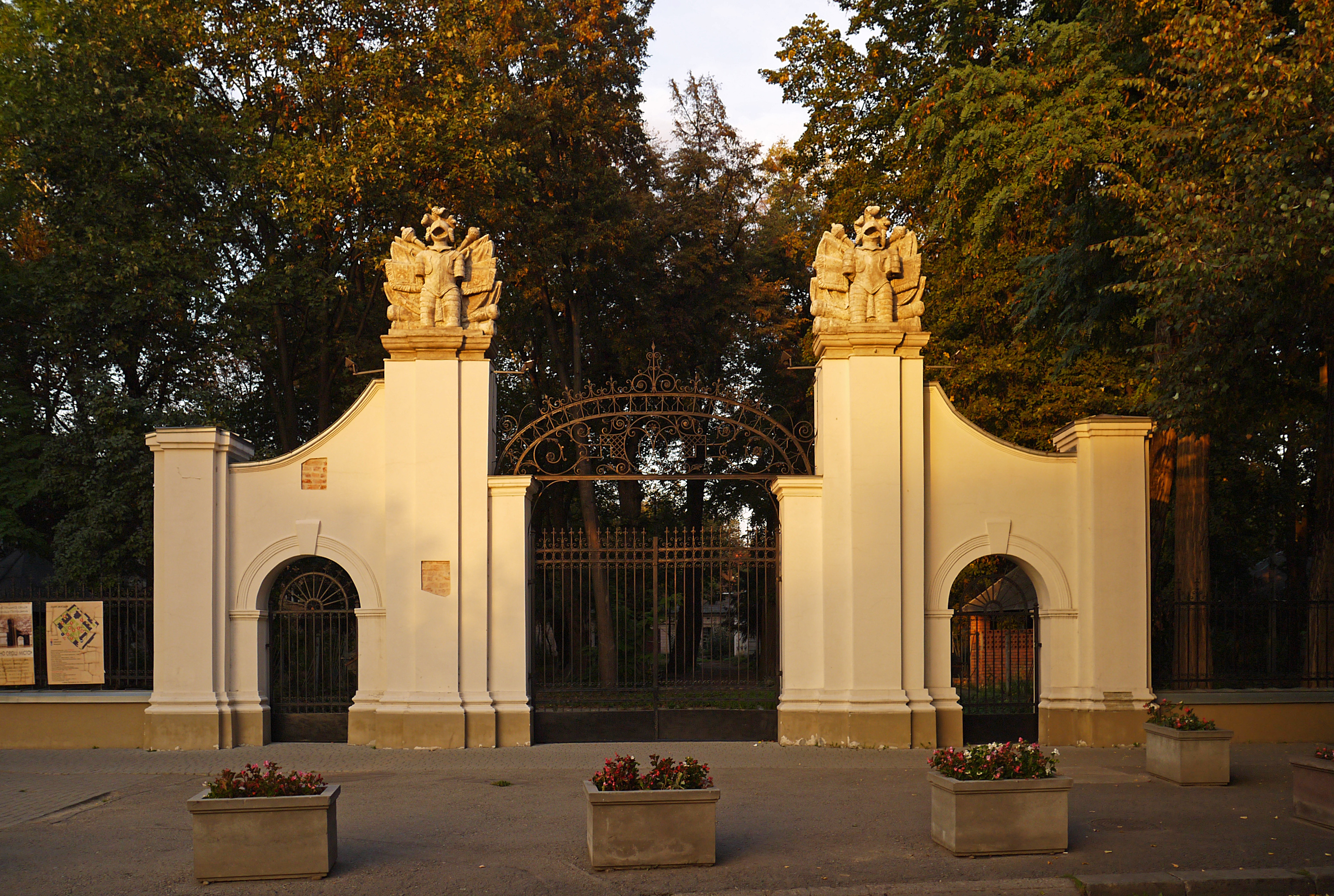
Palace gate

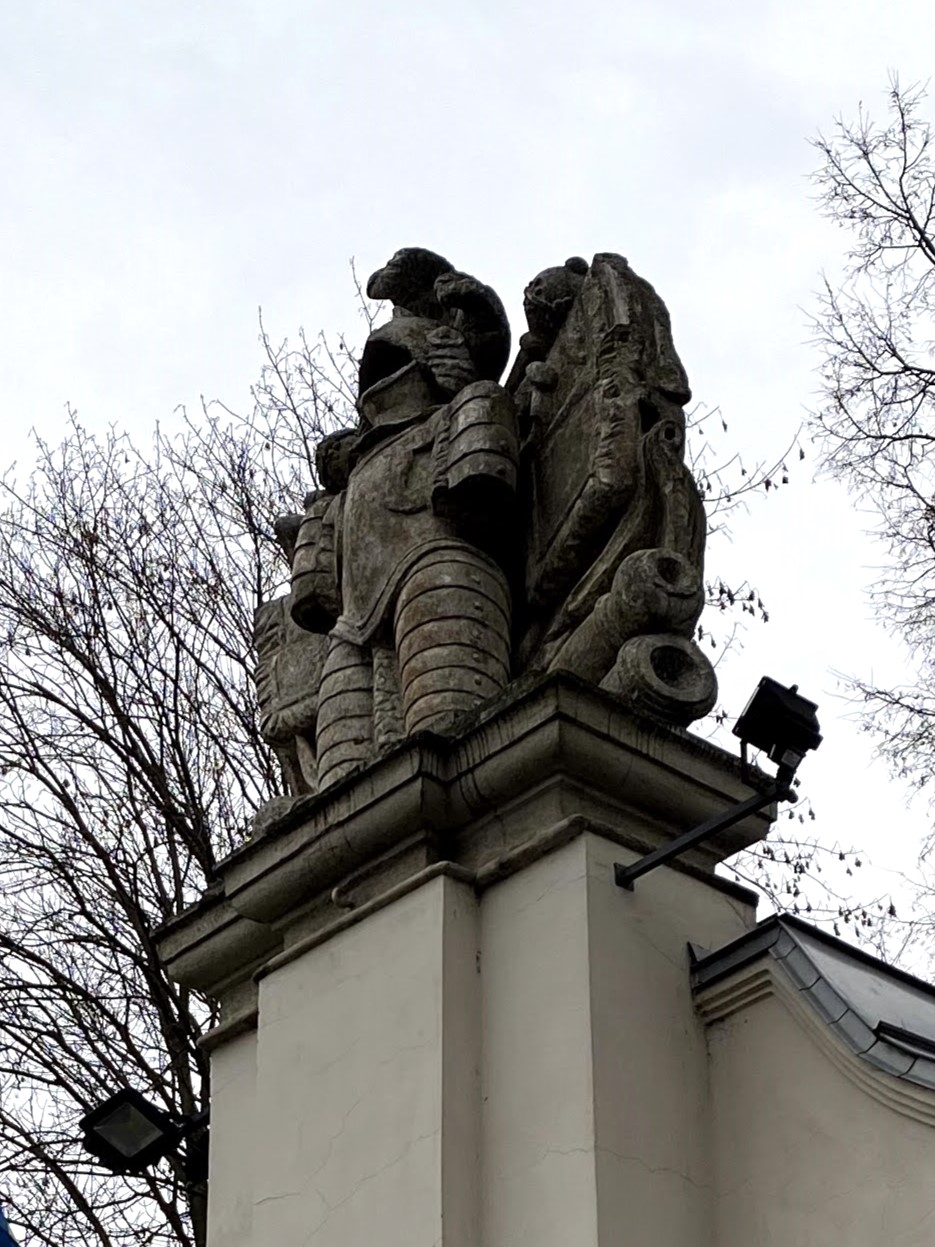
Gate detail

== See also ==
- Potocki Palace
