= Fence exhibition =

Unauthorized painting exhibition in 1967

- Date: 8 May 1967
- Duration: 3 hours
- Location: Odesa Opera House, Odesa, Ukraine; 46.485556°N 30.741667°E
- Participants: Stanislav Sychov, Valentin Khrushch

The fence exhibition is an exhibition of young artists Stanislav Sychov and Valentin Khrushch, organized in Odesa on 8 May 1967, on the fence of the Odesa Opera House.

== History ==
On 8 May 1967, Odessa artists Stanislav Sychov and Valentin Khrushch decided to show their paintings to the public. A boardwalk fence at The Palais Royal Park, installed in connection with the renovation of the Opera House, was chosen to accommodate the unauthorized exhibition. The artists signed their names on the fence in chalk. The fence exhibition lasted only three hours and was dispersed by police. This event in Odesa took place seven years before the famous Bulldozer Exhibition in Moscow, it is considered the beginning of the public activity of Soviet nonconformism.

There was a precedent in the history of Russian futurism: in 1919, the futurist Anton Sorokin held three "Fence Exhibitions" in Omsk. Omsk at that time was the capital of Kolchak, and despite the ban of the Kolchak authorities, Sorokin was given the right to hold these exhibitions for the signature of David Burliuk, a graduate of the Grekov Odesa Art School.

== Eyewitness account ==
"Naturally, the way to the official exhibition halls for authors professing 'alien' forms of painting and sculpture was closed. The way out of the current situation was found in the actions of 'apartment exhibitions' to which crowds of interested people flocked. At the centre of this movement were L. Hawk, A. Anufriev, V. Strelnikov, V. Khrushch, S. Sychev. The energy of the artists was aimed at creating images devoid of any ideological and political colouring. Attention was focused on the improvement of pure art, in which content and form are an object of aesthetic pleasure and in no way political commentary. This feature distinguished Odesans from the movement of Soviet nonconformists, many of whose ideas were, of course, close to them. The exhibition lasted for only three hours on the fence at the Opera House during the Spring of 1967".

Neither Stanislav Sychev nor Valentin Khrushch are alive today. But the resonance of their audacious act, the first act of public defiance against the Soviets, was huge. It went far beyond Odesa, undoubtedly served as an example of Moscow exhibitions, in particular, the Bulldozer Exhibition.

== Memory ==
- In 1997 the exhibition, Sychyk+Khrushchik, a modern version of this well known event was held. Young artists recreated the events of the fence exhibition with their own work.
- During 2010, in the city of Odesa, in memory of the events of 1967 there was held Fence Exhibition – 2 in which Sergey Anufriev, Sergey Bogolyubov, Vadim Greenberg, Vadim Bondarenko, Leonid Ouitzechov, Dmitry Dulfan and others were involved. The exhibition was placed on the restoration forests of the Maritime Museum.
- Another reconstruction of the Fence Exhibition was made for the large-scale exhibition Odessa School, which was held from 12 to 30 June 2013.
- In the Museum of Contemporary Art of Odesa, the "Festival Exhibition" has a memorial hall which reconstructed this very exhibition, including the inscription on the fence Sychik.

== Sources ==
- Евгений Голубовский Из истории одесского авангарда: «ЗАБОРНАЯ ВЫСТАВКА» Information about the fence exhibition.
- Hall 4. The Legend of the Odessa Underground Valentin Khrushch and Stanislav Sychev Information about Stanislav Sychov and Valentin Khrushch.
- Art of Ukraine: Art of Odessa Fine Paintings Gallery Artwork from the Art Odessa.
- "Одесу можна обійти за три години" Impact of fence exhibition on Odessa.
- Из истории одесского авангарда: «Заборная выставка» : Одесса : Новости : Викна-Одесса The beginning of Soviet nonconformism.
