= Potocki Palace =

Potocki Palace is a palace of the Potocki family:

- Potocki Palace, Warsaw
- Potocki Palace, Lviv
- Potocki Palace, Ivano-Frankivsk
- Potocki Palace, Natolin
- Potocki Palace, Odesa
- Potocki Palace, Tulchyn
- Potocki Palace, Krzeszowice
- Potocki Palace, Międzyrzec Podlaski
- Potocki Palace, Chervonohrad
- Potocki Palace, Brody

== Other former properties of the Potocki family ==
- Wilanów Palace
- Łańcut Palace
- Pomoriany Castle
- Zator Castle
- Livadia Palace
- Antoniny Palace, Antoniny, Ukraine – destroyed in the Russian Civil War in August 1919
