= Anatoliy Dymchuk =

Ukrainian cultural figure

Anatoliy Volodymyrovych Dymchuk (born December 25, 1965) is a Ukrainian cultural figure, collector, gallery owner, founder of Dymchuk Art Promotion, founder and owner of NT-Art Gallery (Odesa), as well as Dymchuk Gallery (Kyiv). He is also the co-founder of the Foundation named after Yuriy Yegorov and Commander of the Public Order of Merit of the 3d degree.

He was born on December 25, 1965, in the city of Rivne. He lives and works in Odesa and Kyiv.

== Education ==
- Hydraulic Engineer at National University of Water and Nature;
- Master of Philosophy at Odesa I. I. Mechnikov National University

== Activity as a gallerist ==
Non-commercial NT-Art Gallery opened in Odesa on December 20, 2007, based on the collection which includes more than 3,000 paintings, drawings, sculptures, photographs and installations from the 1950s to the present day.

Dymchuk Gallery was founded in 2008 in Kyiv. It focuses on contemporary Ukrainian art, including Ukrainian transavantgarde, Southern Wave, and Odesa conceptualism.

Dymchuk Gallery is one of the few Ukrainian galleries that regularly participates in international art forums, exhibitions of contemporary art, and biennials, including, KUNSTART 2009 (Bolzano); ART KYIV Contemporary 2009, 2010, 2011, 2012 (Kyiv); First Kyiv International Biennale of Contemporary Art ARSENALE 2012 (Kyiv); Berliner Liste 2013 (Berlin); VOLTA 10 (Basel); KOLNER LISTE 2015 (Cologne), Art Copenhagen 2015 (Copenhagen). Thus, the Gallery actively promotes Ukrainian contemporary art abroad and arouses interest for it among Western European collectors.

NT-Art Gallery held exhibitions of such classics of contemporary Ukrainian art as Igor Gusev, Oleksander Roytburd, Oleg Tistol, Vasyl’ Tsaholov, Illya Chichkan, Mykola Matsenko, etc. From 2013 to 2015, the Gallery organized around forty solo and group projects.

The mission of Dymchuk Gallery is to promote Ukrainian contemporary art market by organizing exhibitions, presentations, participating in auctions and art fairs in Ukraine and worldwide.

In addition, Dymchuk Gallery is enthusiastically involved in educational activities. To provide deeper understanding of contemporary art, the Gallery publishes exhibition catalogues, booklets and books, delivers lectures; conducts work-shops, literary evenings, and artist talks.

== Curatorial projects ==
Dymchuk initiated and curated several high-profile projects, which brought together the best contemporary Ukrainian artists. These are «RESTART» (Odesa, Kyiv), “Star Wars" (Odesa), "Odesa school. Traditions and actuality" (Donetsk, Kyiv, Dnipropetrovsk), "Bebel str. 19. Apartment Exhibitions" (Kyiv, Odesa).

== Publishing ==
Dymchuk and NT-Art Galleries published around 50 exhibition catalogues, books, poetry collections, including unique editions such as Art Raiders. The Chronicles of Odesa Actionism, Art Training magazine, Igor Gusev's poetry collection "Likehokku", the catalogue of the “Bebel str. 19. Apartment Exhibitions" and “Odesa school. Traditions and actuality” exhibitions, as well as the catalogue to the personal exhibition of Yuriy Yegorov.

== Support for cultural projects ==
Anatoliy Dymchuk is also involved in organization of gigs, including concert of the guitarist Mark Ribot and his band Ceramic Dog (Odesa, 2014). He was the investor and producer of Pavlik Morozov and Humanists 2 theatrical projects by the famous Ukrainian playwright and artist Les’ Podervyanskyi. He also supported the play Buna at the Pasika theatrical center (Kyiv-Mohyla Academy, 2014).

== See also ==
- NT-Art Gallery
- Yuriy N.Yegorov
- Dymchuk Gallery
