= Viktor Marynyuk =

Ukrainian artist (1939–2025)

- Віктор Маринюк
- Born: 10 April 1939; Kazavchyn, Odesa Oblast, Ukrainian SSR, USSR
- Died: 6 November 2025 (aged 86); Odesa, Ukraine
- Occupation: Artist
- Known for: Painting, graphic, sculpture
- Movement: Modernism
- Honours: Honored Artist of Ukraine

Viktor Vasyliovych Marynyuk (Ukrainian: Ві́ктор Васи́льович Мариню́к; 10 April 1939 – 6 November 2025) was a Ukrainian artist known for his painting, graphics, and sculpture. An Honored Artist of Ukraine, he was one of the central figures of Odesa unofficial art.

== Life and career ==
Marynyuk was born on 10 April 1939, in the village of Kazavchyn, Odesa Oblast (now in Holovanivsk Raion, Kirovohrad Oblast).

In 1959, he graduated from the Odesa Automobile and Road Technical School. In 1967, he graduated from the Odesa Art College named after M. B. Grekov. His teacher was Lyubov Tokareva-Alexandrovich.

Marynyuk was one of the founders of the group of young non-conformist artists, which also included Alexander Anufriev, Vladimir Strelnikov, Valery Basanets. In 1971, their unofficial group exhibition took place in the premises of the Union of Artists, which had a wide resonance in the artistic circles of Odesa.

From 1975 to 1980, he organized and participated in many unofficial "apartment" exhibitions in Odesa and Moscow.

In 1979, he took part in an exhibition "Contemporary Art from Ukraine" - Munich - London - Paris - New York.

In 1987, Marynyuk became a member of the USSR Union of Artists, later the National Union of Artists of Ukraine.

In 1989, he took part in a group exhibition at the Bavarian State Ministry of Labor (Munich).

In the 1990s, he carried out active exhibition activities, participated in and formed the expositions of three international biennials. "Impreza" (Ivano-Frankivsk), was a member of the jury.

From 1991, he was an honorary member of the Kyiv-Mohyla Academy.

In 1992, he was one of the founders of the Choven creative association, and in 1998, the Mamai creative association.

On 10 October 2008, Marynyuk was awarded the title of Honored Artist of Ukraine for a significant personal contribution to the development of national fine arts, significant achievements in professional activities and on the occasion of the 70th anniversary of the founding of the National Union of Artists of Ukraine.

Marynyuk lived and worked in Odesa. He died on 6 November 2025, at the age of 86.

== Work ==
The artist's work is characterized by a synthetic variability of the formal features of the national, Renaissance-Baroque and modern figurative language. The figurative and abstract images created by him are saturated with bright decorativeness and metaphor. He was the creator of a number of paintings, mosaics, stained-glass windows in Odesa and other cities.

== Museum collections ==
- Zimmerli Art Museum at Rutgers University (New Jersey, United States)
- Museum of Modern Art of Ukraine (Kyiv, Ukraine)
- National University of Kyiv-Mohyla Academy (Kyiv, Ukraine)
- Odesa Fine Arts Museum (Odesa, Ukraine)
- The Museum of Odesa Modern Art (Odesa, Ukraine)
- Odesa Literature Museum (Odesa, Ukraine)
- Khmelnytskyi Museum of Ukrainian Contemporary Art (Khmelnytskyi, Ukraine)
- Museum of Contemporary Ukrainian Art Korsakiv (Lutsk, Ukraine)
