= Obrazotvorche Mystetstvo =

Ukrainian oldest art magazines

Obrazotvorche Mystetstvo; Образотворче мистецтво
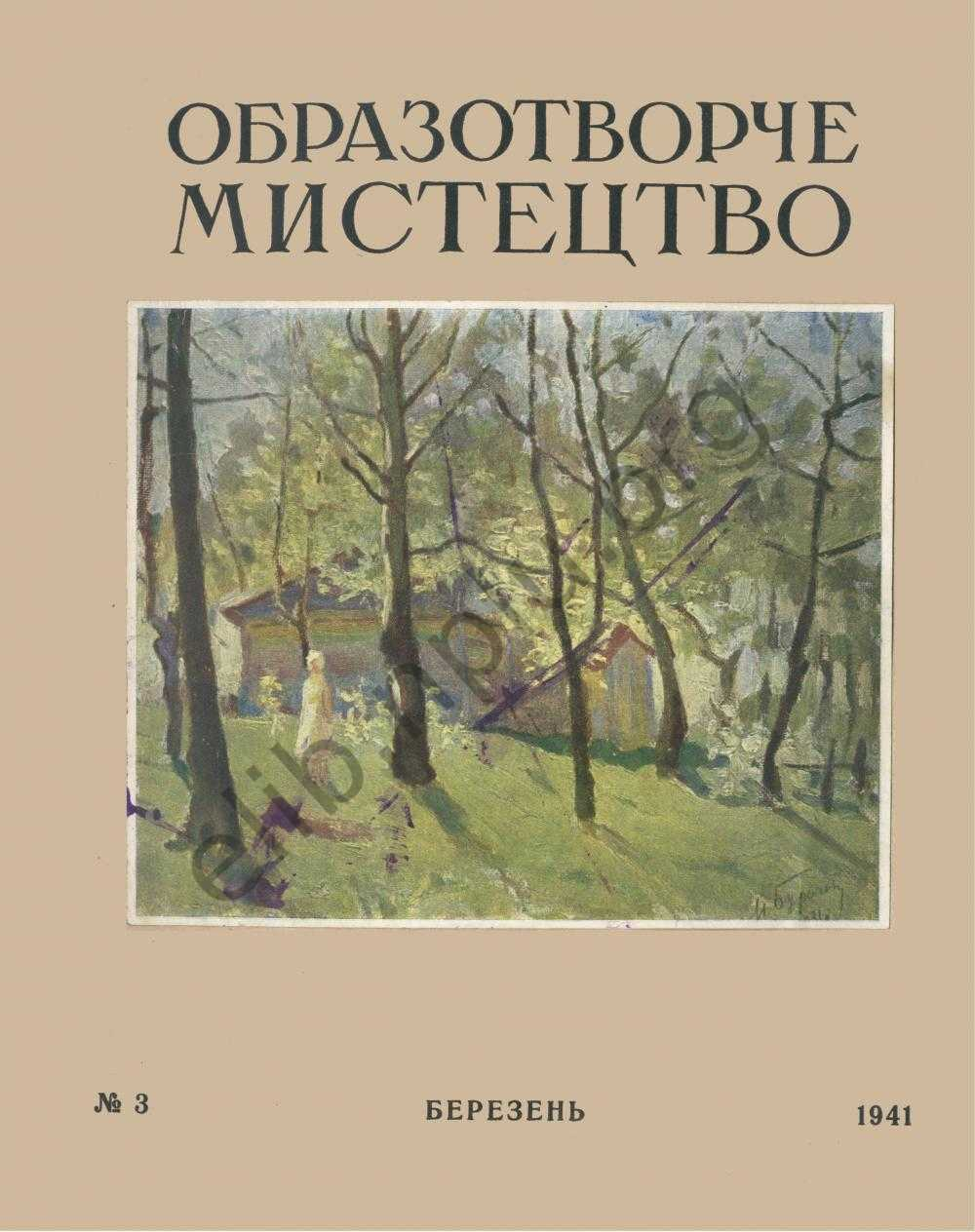
- Cover of the magazine Obrazotvorche Mystetstvo for 1941. Mykola Burachek. Landscape.
- Editor: Volodymyr Petrashyk
- Categories: Fine art
- Frequency: Bimonthly
- First issue: 1935
- Company: National Union of Artists of Ukraine
- Country: Ukraine
- Based in: 1-5 Sichovykh Striltsiv, Kyiv
- Language: Ukrainian

Obrazotvorche Mystetstvo (Ukrainian: Образотворче мистецтво, lit. ''Fine Art'') is one of the oldest art magazines in Ukraine, founded in 1935 under the name Maliartstvo i Skulptura.

== History ==
In 1939–1941, it had its modern name. With the outbreak of World War II, the magazine ceased publication. In 1954, the revived magazine, now called Mystetstvo, featured articles on the visual arts, as well as music and theater. From 1991, it has been published by the National Union of Artists of Ukraine.

Currently, the magazine publishes articles on Ukrainian visual art, contemporary artists' practices, exhibitions, and other topics.

== Editors ==
- 1935–1941 – Yevhen Kholostenko
- 1954–1969, 1970–1986 – Petro Hovdia
- 1987–1991 – Oleksii Zhuravel
- 1991–2005 – Mykola Marychevskyi
- 2006–2020 – Oleksandr Fedoruk
- from 2020 – Volodymyr Petrashyk

== See also ==
List of magazines in Ukraine
