= Mykola Storozhenko (painter) =

Ukrainian painter (1928-2015)

Mykola Storozhenko PAU
- Микола Стороженко
- Born: 24 September 1928; Viazove, Konotop Raion, Sumy Oblast, Ukraine
- Died: 15 April 2015 (aged 86); Kyiv, Ukraine
- Education: Odessa State Art College, Kyiv State Institute of Arts
- Occupations: Painter, writer, academic
- Awards: Shevchenko National Prize

Mykola (Nikolay Andreyevich) Storozhenko (24 September 1928 – 15 April 2015) was a Ukrainian painter, author and academic.

Storozhenko won the 1988 Shevchenko National Prize among other awards. His works were exhibited in Asia, Europe and the United States. He was a professor and department head at the National Academy of Visual Arts and Architecture in Kyiv for several decades.

== Early years ==
Storozhenko was born on 24 September 1928, in the village of Viazove, Konotop District, in what was then the Soviet Union. In 1945, after completing his 7th year of school, Storozhenko entered Odessa State Art College where his teachers included M. A. Sheliuto [uk], and L. Y. Muchnyk [uk],. After graduating in 1950, he entered the Kyiv State Institute of Arts (now National Academy of Visual Arts and Architecture.) His teachers were Tetyana Yablonska, M. A. Sharonov, and S. O. Hryhoriev, all of whom are recognised as outstanding Ukrainian painters.

While studying in the institute, in 1953–1954, Storozhenko visited Kazakhstan and Altai and created more than eight hundred sketches of farmers in those areas. Upon completion of his studies at the institute in 1956, Storozhenko wrote a thesis entitled "The First Shoots". In 1957, this work was exhibited at the 6th International Festival of Youth and Students in Moscow; Storozhenko was a participant in the festival's international fine arts studio.

== Career ==
Upon graduating from the institute, Storozhenko started working on a new technology of mosaic, hot and cold encaustic, and tested the new approaches to the color circle and monotype making. He created works such as "Kyiv Mohyla Academy of the 17th—18th centuries" (Kyiv, Feofania), mosaic "Scythian Ukraine: Hellas of the Steppes" (Gilea Hotel, Kherson region), mosaic "Brightened with the Light" (Kyiv), hot encaustic, "The Trinity murals in the cupola of St. Mykola Prytyska Church (Kyiv), cold encaustic and others.

From 1974, Storozhenko taught at the National Academy of Visual Arts and Architecture holding professor office at the Subfaculty of Painting and Composition. In 1994, he was made the head of the Studio of Painting and Iconographic Art and of the Department of Training at the same academy.

== Works ==
- "Light from Darkness" at the National Taras Shevchenko Museum, Kyiv;
- "Birch Tree" in Sevastopol;
- "Fata Morgana" in Chernihiv;
- "Shevchenko" in Yahotyn;
- illustrations for works by T. Shevchenko in Kaniv;
- "Girl in Pink" in Moscow.
- "Chuhaister", Canada;
- "Ukrainian Folk Tales", "Images of Virgin Land Tillers", De Sanctis, Italy;
- "The Son of the God", "The Battle", "The Cap", Amazonia, collection of H. Voskobiynyk, the USA;
- "Orpheus and Eurydice", "Sacrifice", "Honta", private collections in the USA;
- "The Hutsul", Croatia.

== Awards ==
- Storozhenko's works were exhibited in different countries, receiving the 1st grade, 2nd grade awards or special diplomas. These include "The First Shoots" ("The Agronomist"), "The Birch Tree", "Amidst the Steppes" (based on a novel of the same name by Panas Myrny), "Fata Morgana", "Anaconda" a.
- 1979 2nd silver medal at the 12th-International Contest in Sofia (Bulgaria) for his Bulgarian Folk Tales series.
- In 1988, Shevchenko National Prize of Ukraine for his Ukrainian Folk Tales series and graphics.
- 1990 – honorary citizen of Winnipeg and Brandon (Canada).
- 1997 – People's Artist of Ukraine.
- 1999, Honorary Diplomas of the American (USA) and Cambridge (Great Britain) Biographical Institutes; his biography was included in the reference book "The Life of the Famous".
- 2000, Gold Medal of the Ukrainian Academy of Arts for his works "The Trinity", "The Seraphim", "St. Mykola the Miracle Man" and the architectonic design of the central part of St. Mykola Prytyska Church.
- 2001, elected academician secretary of the Department of Fine Arts and member of the Presidium of the Ukrainian Academy of Arts.
- 2004, the 3rd degree Order of Merit by the Ukrainian State.

== Written work ==
- "The Fairy Tale: A Winged Reality", Detskaya Literatura magazine, Moscow, 1984;
- "Truthful Sketchy Thoughts on the Creative Work of A. Marchuk", Kraków, 2001;
- essay reflections and preface to "Kobzar" by T. Shevchenko "I Can Read Logos in His Look", Kyiv: Dnipro Publishers, 2004;
- "Creative Work is Independent of Earthly Blessings", in "I. Sharov, 100-Contemporaries: Reflections on Ukraine", Kyiv, 2002;
- "Thoughts Beneath the Vault", Mystetski Obrii anthology, issue 1, 2002, Kyiv,

== Major exhibitions ==
- 1956 – The First Shoots (The Agronomist). The 5tn All-union exhibition of diploma works. Moscow.
- 1957 – Amateur Art, The First Shoots. The 6 World Festival of Youth and Students. Moscow. Participant in an international fine-arts studio. Moscow.
- 1958 – After Work. All-Union exhibition commemorating the 40th anniversary of the VLKSM (Komsomol). Moscow.
- 1961 – Shevchenko and Contemporaries. Art exhibition devoted to the life and activities of T. H. Shevchenko. Kyiv.
- 1965 – Republican exhibition "Berizka". Kyiv.
- 1965 – All-union exhibition "Beryozka". Moscow.
- 1969 – For the Earth. The 1st exhibition of monumental decorative art. Kyiv.
- 1975 – Anaconda by H. Quiroga. International book exhibition. Moscow.
- 1976 – Fortress by L Brazov, Anaconda by H.Quiroga. Ukrainian Soviet books for children. Prague.
- 1977 – Kyiv-Mohyla Academy of the 17th-18th centuries. Republican exhibition. Kyiv.
- 1977 – Bulgarian Folk Tales. Republican exhibition-contest: Art of designing books for children and youth. Kyiv.
- 1979 – Bulgarian Folk Tales. The 12th international exhibition-contest: "Best Foreign Publications of Bulgarian Authors." Sofia, Bulgaria.
- 1980 – Fata Morgana by M. Kotsiubynsky. Republican art exhibition. Kyiv.
- 1980 – Amidst the Steppes by P. Myrny. Republican art exhibition "The Artist and the Book". Kyiv.
- 1981 – Amidst the Steppes by P. Myrny. International exhibition. "Days of Ukrainian Culture". Leipzig.
- 1983 – Sonnets by I. Franko. The 4th republican exhibition "The Artist and the Book". Kyiv.
- 1985 – Brightenet with the Light. Art exhibition "The Artist and the City". Poland.
- 1988 – Personal exhibition. Kyiv.
- 1989 – Ukrainian Folk Tales, Fortress by L. Brazov. "Ukrainian Books for Children", Prague.
- 1990 – Ukrainian Folk Tales. "Synergos-1", University Gallery, Winnipeg, Canada.
- 1990 – Ukrainian Folk Tales. Biennale. "International Exhibition of Children's Books Artists". Seoul, Korea.
- 1993 – 5000-4000 B.C., The World of Trypillia. "Ukraine and Images". New York.
- 1994 – Wife's Portrait. "Svitovyd", gallery of the Artists' League of Ukraine. Kyiv.
- 1995 – "The Master and His Pupils". Kyiv-Mohyla Academy. Art gallery. Kyiv.
- 1996 – "From School to Temple". Kyiv.
- 2000 – "Images in Religious Culture". "Studio of Painting and Iconographic Art". Philharmonic Society. Kyiv.
- 2004 – Personal exhibition. National Art Museum of Ukraine. Kyiv.
- 2004 – Kobzar, Symbols of Prychornomorya. Consulate General, Embassy of Ukraine in the
- United States, gallery of the Ukrainian Institute of America. New York, Washington, DC. Annual exhibitions at the exhibition hall of the Artists' League of Ukraine and the Lavra Gallery; exhibitions by the Academy of Arts of Ukraine in Kyiv and Vinnytsia.

== Major publications and press reviews ==
- Monumental Decorative Art in the Architecture of Ukraine, Kyiv, 1989.
- From Concept to Implementation, 1989.
- M. Storozhenko, Creative Work is Independent of Earthly Blessings. //I. Sharov, 100-Contemporaries: Reflections on Ukraine, 2002.
- Who Is Who. Vol. 2. 2000/2001, p.176.
- I Can Read Logos in His Look. Preface. Reflections. Essays. //T. Shevchenko, Kobzar. Kyiv: Dnipro Publishers, 2004.
- Chronicle—2000/2001, 1995.
- V. Scherbak, St. Mykola the Miracle Man; Mykola Storozhenko. – Mystetski Obrii, 1999.
- "The Best Publications. The 24th All-Union Contest: The Book Art". Moscow, 1982.
- Graphical Works by Ukrainian Artists. Mystetstvo Publishers, 1989.
- Korean Works 1990, 5, 90. The 2nd International Exhibition of Picture Book Illustrations for Children, Seoul, Korea.
- The Monumental and Applied Decorative Art of Kyiv, 1991.
- M. Storozhenko, From School to Temple; O. Solovey, The School of M. Storozhenko, – Suchasnist, issue 5, 2002.
- Andriy Yaremchyk, Ptakh Neba. – Ukrainska Kultura, issue 5, 2003.
- V. Scherbak, St. Mykola the Miracle Man Facilitates Success. – Obrazotvorche Mystetstvo, issue 1–2, 1999.
- Mykola Storozhenko is 75. – Obrazotvorche Mystetstvo, issue 4, 2003.
- M. Storozhenko, The Unfading Soul of O. Zakharchuk. – Obrazotvorche Mystetstvo, issue 1, 2004.
- Mykola Storozhenko, Monologues, Those that Hush Truth with Untruth. – Muzeiny Provulok, issue 1, 2004.
- Sumy Oblast in Names, AS-Media Editing and Publishing Association, 2004.
- From Baroque to Baroque [Mykola Storozhenko]. Iren Gallery. Kyiv. Who Is Who in Ukraine, 2001.
- Oksana Zabuzhko. Report from the Year 2000. Kyiv, 2001. – p. 10.
- Olena Golub. Academician's M. Storozhenko Baroque entertainments//Den (the Day) 2004, - 15 April
- Sonnets. – Khudozhnyk і Knyha, issue 4, 1986.
- M. Storozhenko, O Grey Pigeon [I. M. Honchar]. – Kyiv, issue 5, 2003.
- O. Avramenko, Light of Faith through a World of Images. – The "2000th Anniversary of the Birth of Christ", 12–19 September 1999.
- 500 Influential Personalities. – The 21st Century Leaders. Kharkiv, 2000.
- Valentyna Shkliar, Kobzar in the Light of Storozhenko's Candle. – Suchasnist, issue 5, 2004
- M. Storozhenko, The Golden Artistic Thread of O. Babak. – Ukrainska Kultura, issue 1, 2003.
- Renaissance: Christian Motifs in Works by Kyiv Artists, 1998.
- Tamara Hudesh, You Don't Feel Too Merry when Facing Eternity. – Ukrainske Slovo, 28 October 1999.
- O. Melnyk, The Divine Talent of Mykola Storozhenko, – Ukrainska Hazeta, 8 June, 22 June 2000.
- M. Tsivirko, Prophet Daniel's Materialized Dream, – Evening Kyiv, 19 January 2000.
- R. Hreba, Kyiv and Kyivites. Painting Temples in a Blindfolded and Head-over-heels Manner. – Segodnia, 7 August 2000.
- O. Avramenko, The Heaven of Mykola's Temple.//Vlada, 21–27 March 2000.
- A. Udovychenko, The Master's Rescuing Fall. – Kievskie Vedomosti, 8 February 2000.
- L. Prosiatkivska, His Hand is Guided by the Lord Himself. – Stolytsia, issue 12, 19–25 March 2004.
- L. Fesenko, The Guardian. – Khreschatyk, 19 March 2004.
- V. Holoborodko, Public Love and Authorities' Love. – Pravda Ukrainy, 25–31 March 2004.
- M. Storozhenko, Thoughts beneath the Vault. – Mystetski Obrii, issue 2, 2000.
- M. Storozhenko, Life Wedged into the Body of Creative Work. – Khronika, issue 1, 2000.
- Calendar 2001, Dnipro Publishers, 2000.
- M. Storozhenko, Between Two Worlds. – Gegensatze 12. Malerei und Glas, 2003.
- V. Sikalov, With Fire and Brush. – Stolichnye Novosti, 23–29 September 2003.
- O. Kovalchuk, The Apple-Tree. – Obrazotvorche Mystetstvo, issue 3, 2003.

== Documentary films about M. A. Storozhenko ==
- The Prayer. Script by O. Avramenko, directed by P. Petrenko.
- T. Shevchenko and M. Storozhenko, directed by N. Barynova. – The program "Dzerkalo".
- The Unfading Stars [M. Storozhenko], directed by O. Biyma, 1999–2001.

== Sources ==
- V.Voytovych. Mykola Storozhenko. Album. Kyiv, Dnipro, 2008.
- Mykola Storozhenko. Premonition of Calvary. Kyiv, 2013.
