= Yuriy N. Yegorov =

Ukrainian artist

Yuriy Nikolaevich Yegorov (Ukrainian Єгоров Юрій Миколаєвич), January 27, 1926 Stalingrad (currently Volgograd), USSR – died October 12, 2008, Odesa, Ukraine) was one of the most prominent Ukrainian artists of the 2nd half of the 20 century, a classic of the Odesa school of painting. He created easel and monumental paintings, drawings, tapestries, ceramics, stained glass, and mosaics.

== Biography ==
Yuriy Yegorov was born in Stalingrad to a couple of ballet dancers. Romantic musical theater, which flings the human into sublime state, affected the impressionable boy’s identity, defining the personality of the characters of his future works. Influenced by theater as a synthetic art form, Yuriy Yegorov combined different monumental techniques, such as painting, mosaics, and tapestries.

In 1941, Yegorov’s family evacuated to Tashkent and then moved to Krasnoyarsk together with the Odessa Opera and Ballet Theater. In Krasnoyarsk, the future painter met Kyiv artists Stepan Kirichenko and Zinaida Volkovitskaya, who became his first teachers. They introduced the young man to the world of art and showed him albums of Cézanne, Velazquez, and other painters. When he was 16, the amateur painter joined the Union of Artists of Krasnoyarsk city. Having returned to Odesa in 1946, YuriyYegorov was accepted to the 4th year of the painting department of Odesa Art College, where he studied in the studio of Professor Theophilus Fraerman. In 1948, he entered the Leningrad Institute of Painting, Sculpture and Architecture named after Repin (USSR Academy of Arts). As a student of the 4th year, he moved to the faculty of monumental painting of the Art-Industrial College named after Mukhina(teachers: Johanson, Rublev, Savin). In 1955, Yegorov moved to Odesa to teach at the Grekov Odessa Art school until 1957. He was the rector of the Odesa Academy of Arts in 1995–1997.

Since the beginning of the 1960s, a group of creative young people, later regarded as the Odesa non-conformist artists, gathered around Yegorov. In fact, Yegorov himself was not a non-conformist artist; however, he strongly helped and supported young artists who have chosen the path of confrontation with the system. It was Yegorov who first spoke about the Odesa school of painting and formed its basic tenets, thus becoming its most prominent representative and theorist.

He participated in numerous domestic and foreign exhibitions of painting, graphics and monumental art. Since 1958, he was a member of the Union of Artists of the USSR. He was acknowledged as the Honored Artist of Ukrainian USSR in 1989 and the People's Artist of Ukraine in 2008.

After the artist's death, a permanent exhibition of his works was opened at the Museum of Contemporary Art in Odesa.

== Yegorov’s Sea ==
The sea is an integral part of the inner world of the artist. Yegorov writes about the sea in his memoirs: "... The three of us are standing on the edge of the cliff this summer morning; the giant shield of Sea sparkles with hot dazzling silver on the right and on the left, stretching away into endless distance. Somebody shrieked, and we started to descend one after another, leaning forward on a narrow path, to this immense, sparkling bliss... Many paintings began to slowly, invisiblyripen inside me when I, as a boy of ten, lived in the country of the Big Fountain. Lots of things existed back then as a possibility of which I myself had no idea. In some ways, this opportunity turned out to be a happy one, because something became real in the eternal drama between the possible, the supposed, and the real."

Yegorov’s creative method is characterized by multiple returns to the same motive. The artist does not focus on the search for a new narrative plot, but seeks the most expressive interpretation of the old subject. Hence, he often employs stable compositions coming from antique art and the Renaissance while creating his variations of eternal themes. Yegorov compared himself to a prospector who, having found a precious "lode", tries to develop it in full. When intuition and high artistic culture helped the painter feel he got close to a treasure, he developed these "lodes" for many years, advancing the found forms, postures, and positions of the figure in space.

The essential difference of Yegorov’s painting technique from earlier marine art is his active use of close-ups, when the sea is depicted closely to the viewer. Previously, the sea was usually represented panoramically: the water was harmonically framed with catchy elements of the landscape, such as mountains, rocks, cliffs, and, on the other hand, the halls of high heaven. Sometimes human figures appear on the canvas, mostly as staffage. Anyway, a perspective view of the sea is usually depicted; the latter is an object we perceive with eyes from a distance (this is typical both for academic artists of the 19th century – Aivazovskiy, Bogolyubov, Lagorio, Latri, Sudkovskiy and for the founders of Impressionism – Manet, Monet, Sisley, Whistler, as well for Russian artists of the late 19th – 20th century, such as Pokhitonov, Ladyzhenskiy, Nilus, Sinitskiy, Sheliuto, Malyshev, Morozov, Podobed, etc.). Yegorov, on the contrary, depicts the body of sea water close to the frame of the canvas. The sea often covers the most surface of the canvas. The artist, as a rule, paints it from a particular perspective – a view from above which captures a small section of the coast and a very narrow strip of sky. Because of this approximation, which often resembles a cinematic close-up, we can immediately see and feel the texture of "flesh", "cloth", "stratification" of the water, as Arseniy Tarkovskiy poetically puts it.

Due to such "close-ups", the sense of monumentality and the power of the sea become the fundamental and specific characteristic of the created image. Its integral part is a distinct feeling of the huge weight of water. It is generally a typical mood for a variety of Yegorov’s marinas, even those that are filled with lightness and ease, although the carefree and weightless atmosphere is not characteristic for the painter’s works. Contrasts, which become visible under the extremely bright and blinding light, as well as the game of light and shade, highlight the density of the deadly water mass. The fundamentally roundish lines of the skyline are also a typical feature of Yegorov’s marinas.

Aivazovskiy, for example, used to wander along the coast line for many hours, enthusiastically observing the mysterious field of water, so attractive at the time of the vague sunrise or clear afternoon, at the beginning of twilight or during the sonorous, even solemn sunset. Yegorov’s works, however, reveal something different. It seems that he, unlike his contemplative predecessors, was actively in love with the sea. He seemed to dive into the water and interact with it like a playful dolphin, as if he perceived it not from above, but from the depths. This attitudecan be symbolically called the perspective of a diver. It is the perspective of a person who feels comfortable, safe, and natural in the water, at the same time overcoming its resistance, feeling its tension and buoyancy, as if in a duel. The deep-felt powerful beauty of the sea, perhaps forever imprinted in the emotional memory, is the basis of both unity and variety of the representations of the sea in Yegorov’s works. It is the colossal energy of marine space hidden under the sparkling and shiny surface as in Morning, 1967 (Odesa Art Museum). Girl with a Flag, 1971 (Red Square Gallery. London). We’re Departing Soon, 1973 (Tretyakov Gallery. Moscow), By the Sea, 1974 (Odesa Art Museum). At the same time, it is the stormy, dynamic, suddenly exposed life of the whirlpools, which accidentally appear on the surface of deep currents and which suck everything into the abyss – as in Karolino-Bugaz, 1970 ( Red Square Gallery. London). It is also the cold breathtaking power of the majestic water field as in Lanzheron in November, 1979 (Odesa Art Museum), and, finally, the sapphire ultramarine shining of the sea in Evening in July, 1991 (M. Knobel’s private collection, Odesa).

== Solo exhibitions ==
- 2012 – NT-Art Gallery.Odesa, Ukraine.
- 2008 – NT-Art Gallery. Odesa, Ukraine (catalogue).
- 2006 – Odesa Art Museum. Odesa, Ukraine.
- 2001 – The Air Gallery, Art London.Com Ltd, London, England.
- 1996 – Odesa Art Museum. Odesa, Ukraine.
- 1991 – Red Square Gallery. London, England.
- 1990 – Red Square Gallery. London, England.
- 1989 – Central Exhibition Hall, Moscow, USSR .
- 1988 – The second exhibition of muralist artists. Exhibition hall of Artists` Union of Odesa. Odesa, USSR.
- 1987 – Central Exhibition Hall. Leningrad, USSR.
- 1977 – Central House of Artists. Moscow, USSR.
- 1977 – Odesa Art Museum. Odesa, Ukraine.
- 1976 – Odesa Art Museum. Odesa, Ukraine.
- 1961 – Art Gallery Odesa. Odesa, Ukraine.

== Group exhibitions ==
- 2015 – “Constellations. Yuriy Yegorov, Oleksander Roitburd”. Dymchuk Gallery. Kyiv, Ukraine.
- 2013 – “Odesa School. Traditions and Actuality”. Art Arsenal. Kyiv, Ukraine.
- 2013 – “Odesa School. Traditions and Actuality“. ArtDonbas Exhibition Hall Donetsk, Ukraine (catalogue).
- 2013 – “Bebelstr. 19. Apartment Exhibitions”.NT-Art Gallery. Odesa, Ukraine (catalogue).
- 2013 – “Bebel str. 19. Apartment Exhibitions″.IV Fine Art Ukraine. Art Arsenal. Kyiv, Ukraine (catalogue).
- 2012 – “The Middle Leg”. NT-Art Gallery. Odesa, Ukraine (catalogue).
- 2012 – “Music of the World”. NT-Art Gallery. Odesa, Ukraine (catalogue).
- 2010 – II Fine Art Ukraine. Art Arsenal. Kyiv, Ukraine.
- 2008 – “How young you were… Odesa nonconformist artists.1960s- 1980s in the collections of Felix Kohriht and AnatoliyDymchuk”.NT-Art Gallery. Odesa, Ukraine (catalogue).
- 2005 – “The Odesa Group. Paintings and Graphic Works by Six Major Artists of the Odesa School “
- Chambers Gallery. London, UK (catalogue).
- 2004 – “Odesa School nowadays. Half of the century together.”Odesa Art Museum. Odesa, Ukraine(catalogue).
- 1999 – “Exhibition of Odesa artists.” Exhibition Hall of the Artists` Union, Kyiv, Ukraine.
- 1999 – “Mamai”. Exhibition of the 4th World ‘Ukrainists’ Congress. Odesa Art Museum. Odesa, Ukraine.
- 1993 – Impreza-93 3d International Biennial. Ivano-Frankivsk.Ukraine (catalogue).
- 1987 – The first exhibition of muralists. Museum of Art, Museum of Western and Oriental Art. Odesa, USSR.
- Since 1965 – participated in republican and all-Soviet exhibitions.

== Works in museum collections ==
- Zimmerli Art Museum (New Jersey, USA)
- Odesa Art Museum (Odesa, Ukraine)
- Tretyakov Gallery (Moscow, Russia)
- Mykolaiv Art Museum (Mykolaiv, Ukraine)

== See also ==
- NT-Art Gallery
- Anatoliy V. Dymchuk
- Dymchuk Gallery
- Podolsky Art Gallery
