= Vasiliy Sad =

Ukrainian abstract painter (born 1948)

- Born: Velyki Telkovychi, Rivne oblast
- Education: Grekov Odesa Art school
- Movement: abstract art

Vasiliy (Vasily) Sad (born in 1948) is a Ukrainian abstract painter. He has been an active member "apartment exhibitions" in Odesa, which defended alternative forms of art against the Socialist Realism endorsed by the Soviet Union.

== Early artistic career ==
Born in the Velyki Telkovychi village (Rivne oblast) in Ukraine in 1948, Vasiliy Sad moved to Odesa where he then graduated from the Grekov College of Arts in 1977. Shortly after his graduation he joined the "Mamai" group, a collective of non-conformist abstract painters named after Ukraine's national hero. From the early 1970s, the members of the group took an active part in the dissident Odessa Group. They displayed their art on the occasion of illegal "apartment exhibitions" in Odesa and Moscow, as they championed Soviet Nonconformist Art in Ukraine.

== Collections and exhibitions ==
Works by Vasily Sad are in art collections of the National Art Museum (Kyiv, Ukraine); the Museum of Modern Art (Kyiv, Ukraine); the Khmelnitsky Museum of Modern Ukrainian art, Odesa Museum of Modern Art , Odesa Museum of Western and Eastern Art and international art collections in America, Canada, the UK, Italy, Monaco, UAE, Russia and Ukraine. Works by Vasily Sad have been sold at Phillips auction house, MacDougalls's Auction , Zurich International Contemporary Art Fair (Switzerland), Edinburgh Art Fair (Scotland) and Indian Art Summit (Delhi).

- 2012 15–28 February, Beauty in the Ordinary – solo exhibition, Mount Street Gallery, London
- 2011 25–27 June, Phillips de Pury Contemporary auction, London
- 2011 6–9 June, Auction MacDougall's, London
- 2011 12–15 April, AFTERMATH solo exhibition in commemoration of 25th Anniversary of Chernobyl Disaster; Embassy of Ukraine in the UK
- 2011 20-21 International Art Fair, Kensington Gore, Royal College of Arts, London
- 2010 Edinburgh Art Fair, Scotland
- 2010 Zurich International Contemporary ArtFair, Switzerland
- 2010 II Russian Art Fair, Hilton Park Lane, London
- 2010 Chelsea Art Fair, London
- 2010 20-21 International Art Fair, Kensington Gore, Royal College of Arts, London
- 2009 Russian Art Fair, Carlton Tower Hotel, London
- 2009 Solo exhibition, NT-Art gallery, Odesa, Ukraine
- 2005 “Mamai” art group exhibition, Museum of contemporary Ukrainian art, Khmelnitsky, Ukraine
- 2003 Odesa artists exhibition, Museum of Western and Easter Art, Odesa, Ukraine
- 2002 Graphic art exhibition, Odesa Sea Art gallery, Ukraine
- 2002 National art festival “Cultural heroes”, Odesa, Ukraine
- 2001 International Biennale of modern graphical art, Kyiv, Ukraine
- 2001 Ukraine Triennial “Art-2001″, Kyiv, Ukraine
- 2001 Odesa Sea Art gallery, Odesa, Ukraine
- 2001 “Mamai” art group exhibition, Odesa Contemporary Museum, Ukraine
- 2000 “Mamai” art group exhibition, Odesa, Ukraine
- 2000 Graphic art Triennial, Kyiv, Ukraine
- 1999 IV Ukrainian Art Congress exhibition, Odesa, Ukraine
- 1998 “Mamai” art group exhibition (Odesa’s Non-Conformist), across Ukraine
- 1998 Ukraine Triennial “Art-98″, Kyiv, Ukraine
- 1996 Art club-96 exhibition, Khmelnitsky, Ukraine
- 1995 Ukraine-95 Art exhibition, Dnipropetrovsk, Ukraine
- 1995 “Kandinsky life in Odesa” exhibition, Odesa, Ukraine
- 1994 Group exhibition of art group “Boat”, Odesa, Ukraine
- 1994 3rd Anniversary of Ukrainian Independence exhibition, Odesa, Ukraine
- 1991 Biennale “Impresa”, Ukraine
- 1987 Odesa monumental art exhibition, Odesa, Ukraine
- 1984 Ukrainian Art exhibition, Kyiv, Ukraine

In the 1970s Odesa nonconformist artists among whom was Vasily Sad took an active part in the unofficial, so called “apartment exhibitions”.
