= Stanislav Sychov =

Ukrainian underground artist (1937–2003)

- Born: Станіслав Іванович Сичов; December 19, 1937; Odesa
- Died: September 2, 2003 (aged 65); Odesa
- Education: Grekov Odesa Art School
- Known for: painting, graphic
- Movement: modernism

Stanislav Sychov (Ukrainian: Станіслав Іванович Сичов, romanized: Stanislav Ivanovych Sychov) (December 19, 1937, Odesa, USSR – September 2, 2003, Odesa, Ukraine) was a Ukrainian artist, one of the founders of the Odesa school unofficial (underground) art.

== Biography ==
Stanislav Sychov was born on December 19, 1937, in Odesa.

He graduated from the Odesa Art School in 1960.

Many critics believe that organized in 1967 "Fence exhibition" of young artists and Stanislav Sychev and Valentin Khrushch on the fence of the Odesa Opera House marked the beginning of the "Odesa nonconformism". This show lasted only three hours.

In 1970 took part in the informal exhibitions in Odesa and Moscow. In 1989, he participated in the international exhibition "Impreza" in Ivano-Frankivsk. In 1989, 1994 he had a personal exhibition at the Museum of Western and Eastern Art in Odesa. A significant amount of work is in private collections in Munich, Paris, London, New York, New Jersey, San Francisco.

Stanislav Sychov died on September 2, 2013, in Odesa.
