= Vladimir Strelnikov =

Ukrainian artist

Vladimir Leonidovich Strelnikov
- Born: 25 October 1939 (age 86); Odesa, USSR
- Known for: Painting, graphic
- Movement: Abstract art

Vladimir Leonidovich Strelnikov (Russian: Владимир Леонидович Стрельников) (born 25 October 1939, Odesa, USSR) is a Ukrainian artist, one of the central figures of the Second Odesa Avant-garde.

== Biography ==
From 1959 — 1962 he studied at the Odesa Art School, but did not complete his education. In the 1960s, he joined the group of young non-conformist artists. He took part in "apartment exhibitions" not only in Odesa. One of the founders of the creative association "Mamai".

In 1979, he took part in the unofficial exhibition "Contemporary Art from Ukraine" (Munich — London — Paris — New York). In the same year, Vladimir Strelnikov emigrated to Germany under pressure from the Soviet special services, which persecuted him for organizing "apartment" exhibitions.

Strelnikov lives and works in Munich. Since 1990, he has been coming to Odesa.

The art of Vladimir Strelnikov is reflected in the landscape and environment of the Black Sea. His work reflects formal ties with ancient Slavic icons, as well as "stone women" found in the steppes of the Black Sea.

== Quotes ==
"For me in art, freedom has always been the most important thing." — Vladimir Leonidovich Strelnikov

“I'm amongst those artists about whom in the West they say: the one who walks alone. One can surprise oneself, one can surprise others, but I am a slave, chained to a galley - I ought to create my own." — Vladimir Leonidovich Strelnikov

== Collections ==
=== Museums Collections ===
- Zimmerli Art Museum (New Jersey, United States)
- National Art Museum of Ukraine (Kyiv, Ukraine)
- Museum of Modern Art of Ukraine (Kyiv, Ukraine)
- Odesa Art Museum (Odesa, Ukraine)
- Museum of Odesa Modern Art (Odesa, Ukraine)
- Odesa State Literary Museum (Odesa, Ukraine)

== Awards ==
- 1993 – First Prize at the III International Biennale "IMPRESA - 93" (in the category of painting) (Ivano-Frankivsk, Ukraine)

== Interesting facts ==
Vladimir Strelnikov's grandfather taught calligraphy in Odesa.
