= Odesa Fine Arts Museum =

Art museum in Odesa, Ukraine

Coordinates: 46.4934°N 30.7288°E

Odesa National Fine Arts Museum; Odesa Art Museum
- Одеський національний художній музей

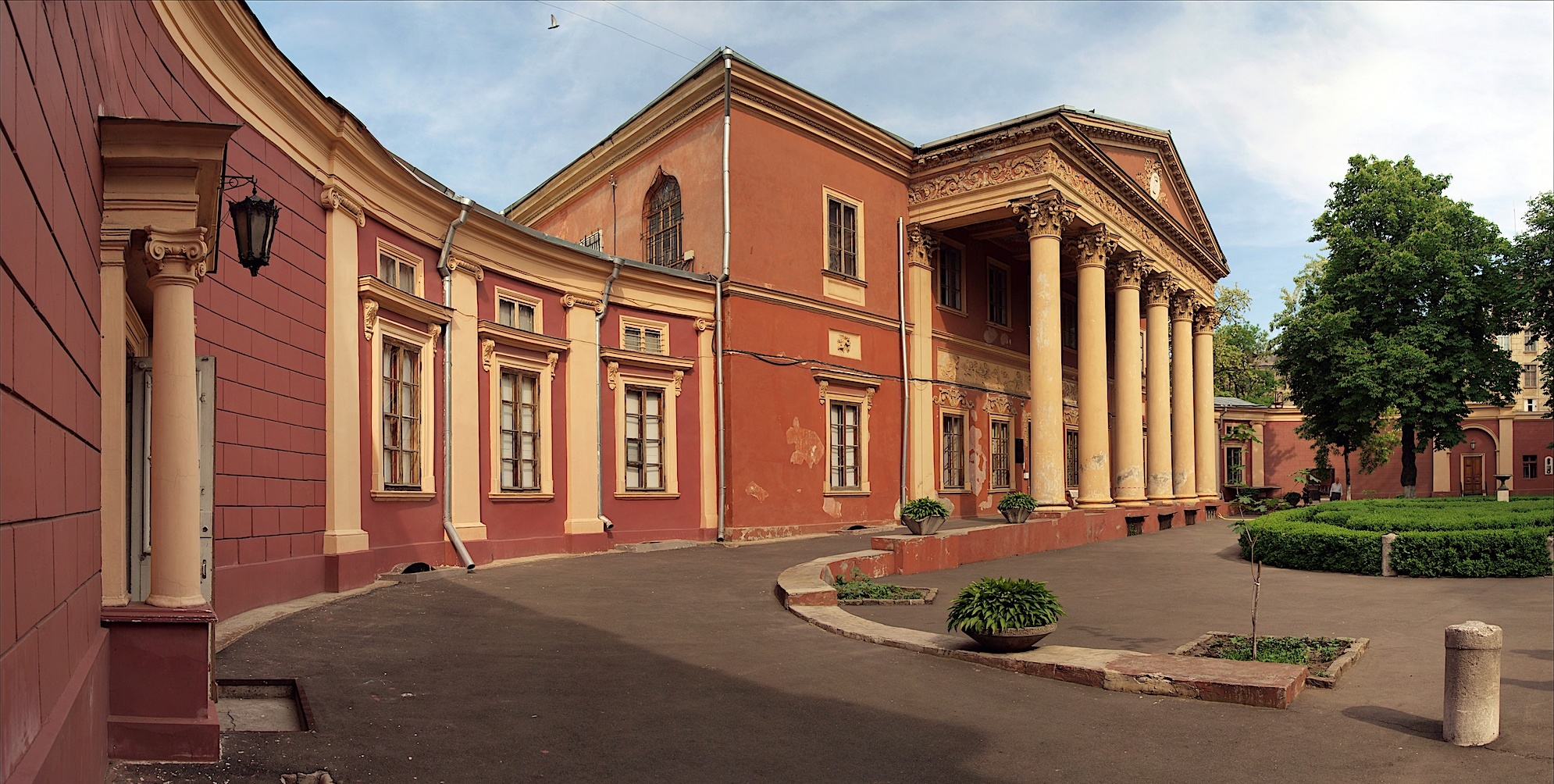
- Established: 6 November 1899
- Location: Sofiyska 5a, Odesa
- Type: Art museum
- Director: Kateryna Kulay
- Website: ofam.ua

The Odesa National Fine Arts Museum or Odesa National Art Museum (Ukrainian: Одеський національний художній музей, romanized: Odeskyi natsionalnyi khudozhnii muzei) is one of the principal art galleries of the city of Odesa in Ukraine. Founded in 1899, it occupies the Potocki Palace (Polish pronunciation: [pɔˈtɔt͡skʲi]), itself a monument of early 19th century architecture. The museum now houses more than 10 thousand pieces of art, including paintings by some of the best-known Russian and Ukrainian artists of late 19th and early 20th century. It is the only museum in Odesa that has free entrance day every last Sunday of the month.

== History ==
The palace that now houses the gallery is one of the oldest palaces of Odesa. It was ordered by Seweryn Potocki, a former member of the Polish Sejm who after the partitions of Poland became supervisor of the Kharkiv University. Potocki was also a wealthy landowner and one of his properties, the village of Severinovka named after him contained a quarry of light limestone, from which both the palace and most of Odesa's public buildings were built.

The construction started in 1805 and was supervised by Francesco Boffo, a noted Italian architect and the author of many palaces and public buildings in Odesa and the Crimea. Construction of the main building was ready by 1810, though due to Napoleonic Wars works on internal furnishing did not commence until 1824 and were finished by 1828.

The neoclassical building is a typical magnate residence of the epoch, with two floors, a large portico with a tympanum supported by six classical columns. The main building is joined to the side wings by semi-circular galleries, forming a Cour d'honneur in front of the palace. Behind it a small English-style landscape garden was created, with a romantic grotto. The interior design is mostly an eclectic mixture of various styles popular in early 19th century.

Seweryn Potocki, who died in 1829, did not see the palace completed. Instead, it was inherited by his distant relative, Olga Potocka, daughter to Stanisław Szczęsny Potocki. Potocka married Lev Naryshkin; although the palace remained her personal property, it is sometimes incorrectly referred to as Naryshkin Palace. In 1888 the building was sold to the mayor of Odesa, Grigorios Maraslis who then sold it in 1892 to the Odesa Society of Fine Arts. It took 9 more years to complete the first collection. Finally, Odesa Fine Arts Museum was opened on 6 November 1899. The core of the initial collection was formed by paintings donated to the museum by the St. Petersburg Imperial Academy of Arts. In 1920s, the museum was renamed Peoples Art Museum. After World War II, it was reopened as Odesa Art Gallery. It obtained its present name in 2021.

During the Russian invasion of Ukraine, the museum prepared itself for potential damage to the building and collections.

In 2022, the museum was included in the list of cultural institutions that became participants in the Museum for Change, receiving together a grant in the total amount of 98,000 US dollars.

On 30 November 2022, the Odesa City Council supported the decision to dismantle and temporarily move the Monument to the founders of Odesa to the Odesa National Fine Arts Museum.

On 5 November 2023, the museum building sustained significant damage following a Russian air attack. Images from inside the facility showed artwork ripped from walls and windows blown out by aerial bombardment. The museum, which was celebrating its 124th anniversary on the day of the attack, said none of its collections were destroyed but that it would be closed until further notice.

== Gallery ==
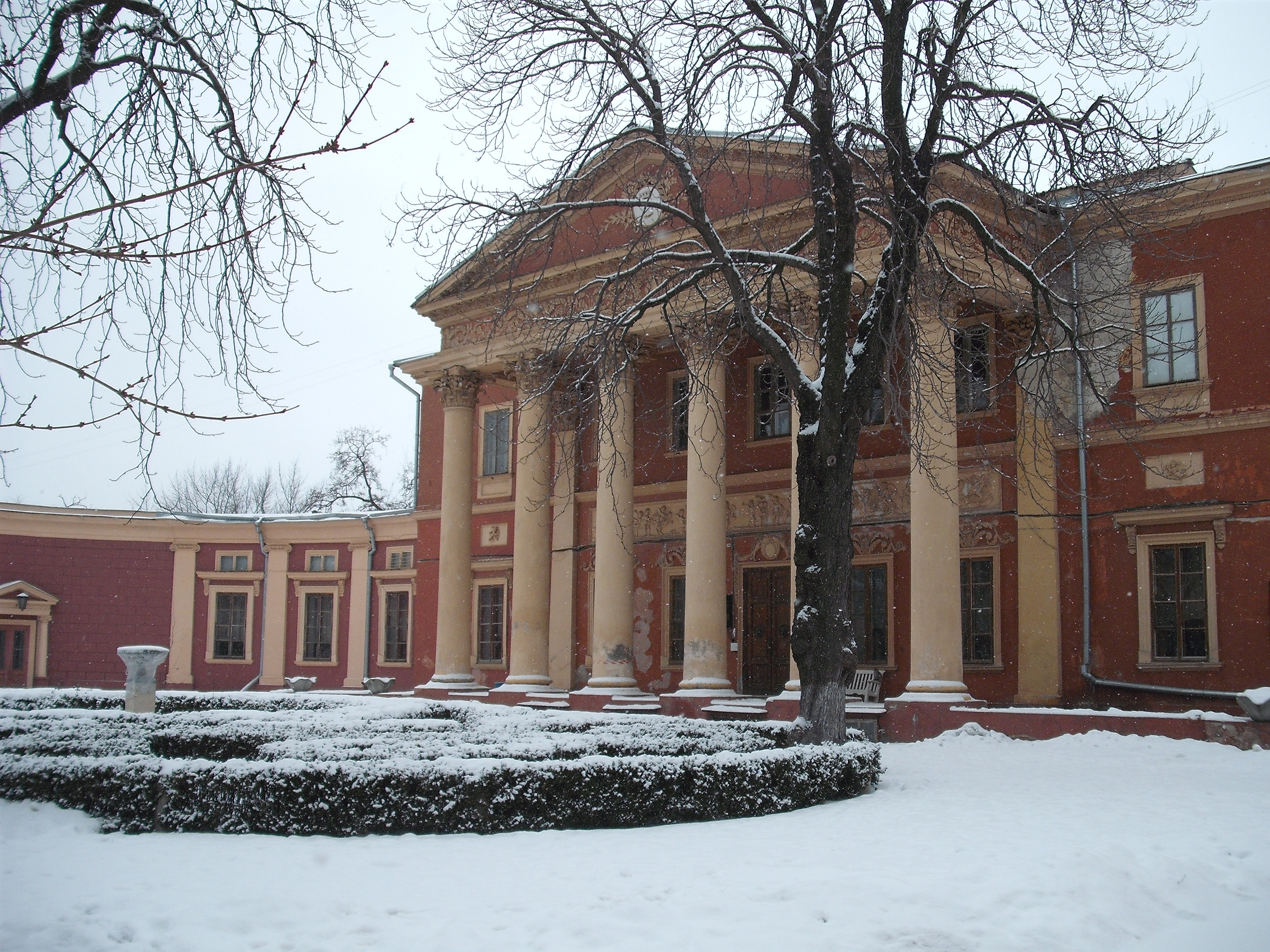
The Odesa Fine Arts Museum facade was repainted red in the 20th century.

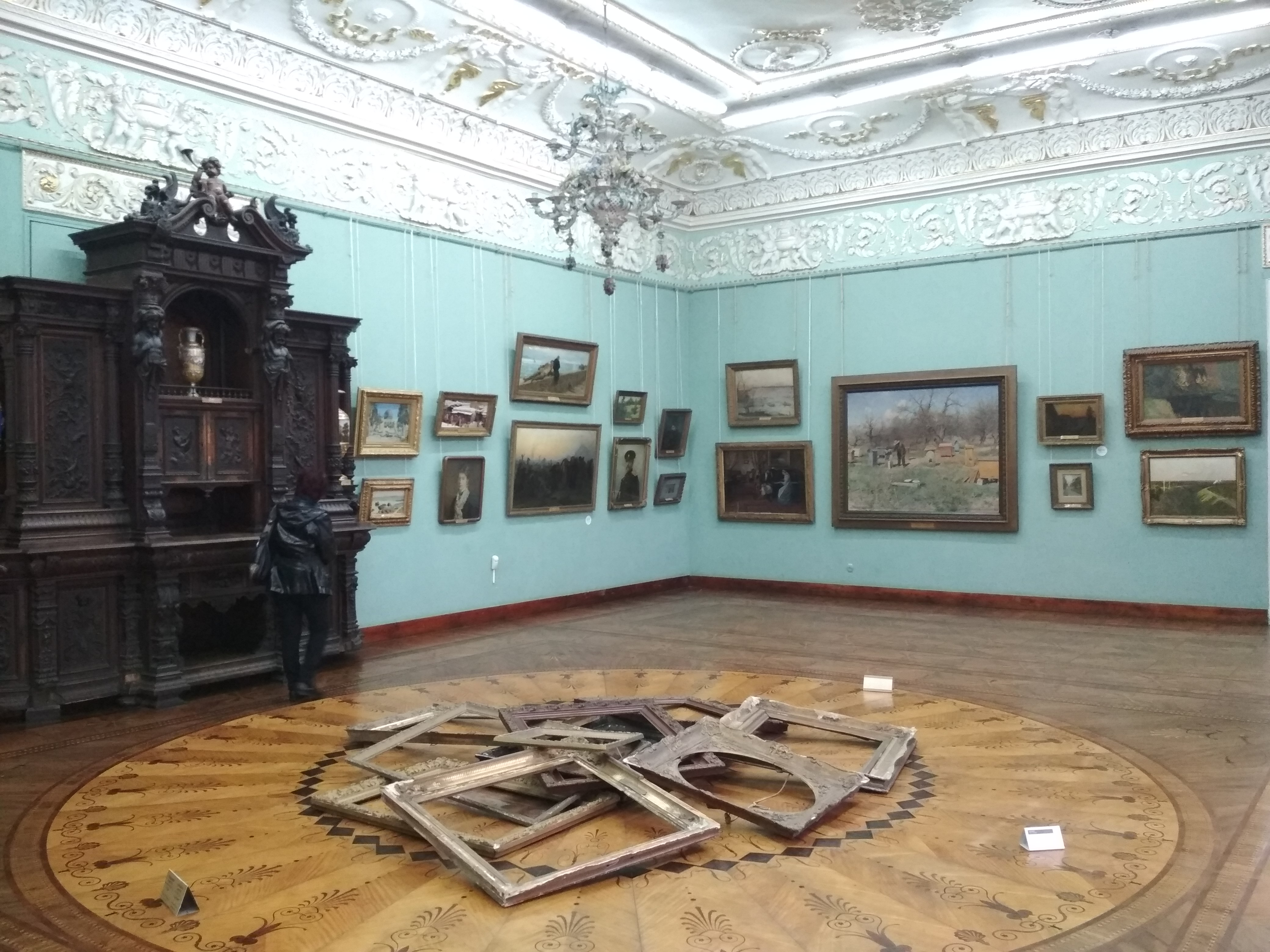
Interior of the Odesa Fine Arts Museum.

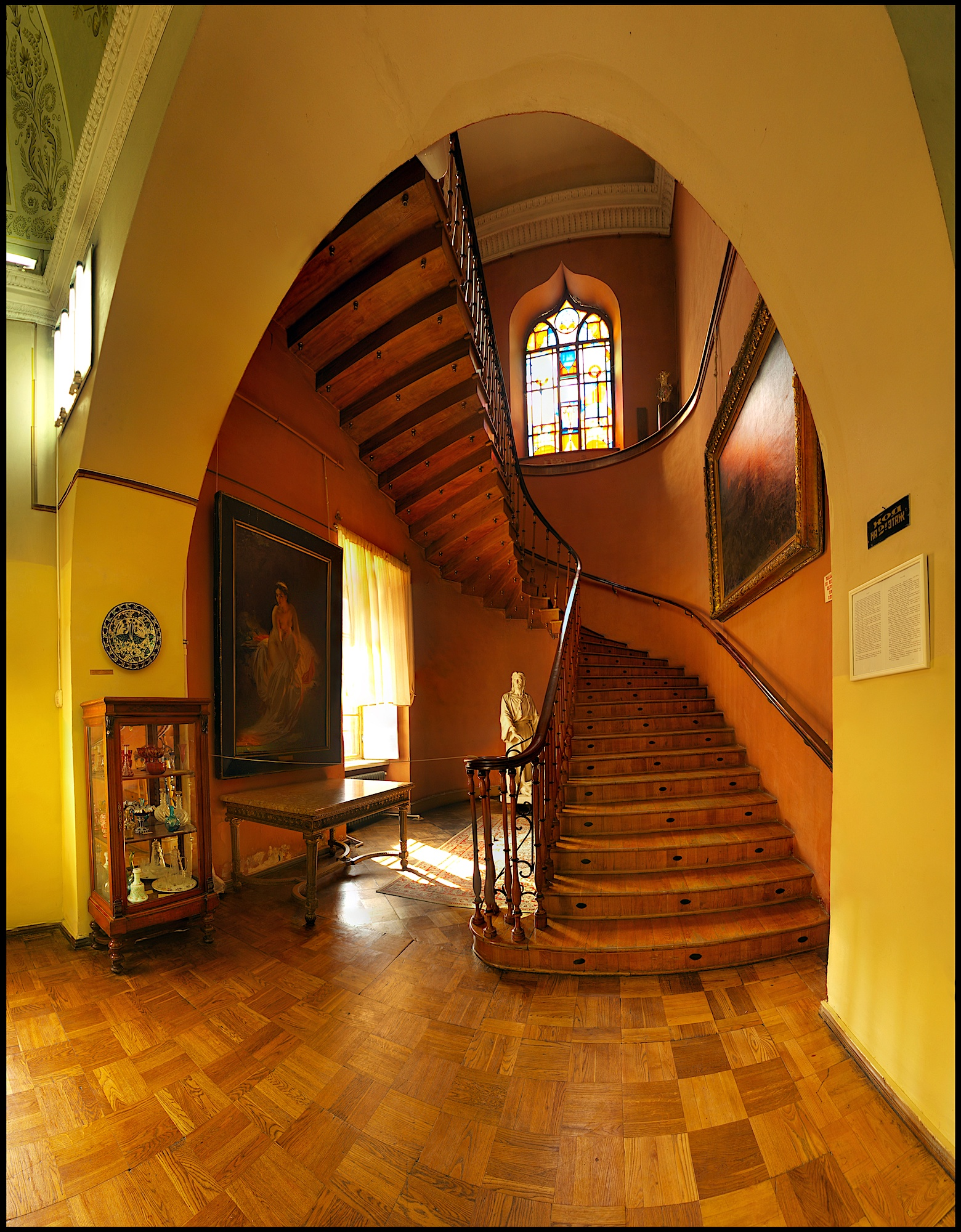
The interior of the palace is mostly eclectic.

== Collection ==
The collection of the Odesa National Fine Arts Museum covers all art forms: painting, drawing, sculpture, decorative arts and averaging more than 10,000 works. In the exhibition, located in 26 halls, are painter's works of the 16th–20th centuries and secular portraits of the 17th century.

Of note are numerous works of Ivan Aivazovsky and some early paintings of Wassily Kandinsky. There is also a large collection of the Peredvizhniki movement, as well as paintings and other works of art by, among others, Ivan Kramskoi, Alexei Savrasov, Isaac Levitan, Ivan Shishkin, Arkhip Kuindzhi, Ilya Repin, Vasily Surikov, Alexandre Benois, Valentin Serov, Mikhail Vrubel, Nicholas Roerich, Boris Kustodiev, Konstantin Somov.

The museum exhibits a large collection of works by the local school of painting – TURH (in Russian ТЮРХ), the main representatives of which are: Kyriak Kostandi, Yevgeniy Bukovetskiy, Gerasim Golovkov, Tit Dvornikov, Petr Ganskiy, Gennady Ladyzhensky, Aleksandr Stilianudi, Pyotr Nilus and Nikolai Kuznetsov.

Art museum houses the only collection of Soviet painting in Odesa, so-called social art, or social realism. The collection represented by paintings of both early and late Soviet art, both forbidden and officially approved: Teofil Fraerman, Yuri Egorov, Valery Geghamyan, Martiros Sarian, Leonid Muchnyk, Alexander Atzmanchuk, Anatol Petrytsky, Valentin Khrushch, Amshey Nurenberg.

== Grotto ==
Under the National Art Museum located several void cellars and galleries, in one of which an underground grotto was built under the central part of the building. In the 1960th of the last century, specialists of Odesa restoration workshops based on historical documents carried out a fundamental restoration of the grotto. Today the grotto is accessible for visiting and is part of an excursion dedicated to the history of the palace.

== See also ==
- Odesa Museum of Western and Eastern Art
- Potocki Palace
