= National Union of Artists of Ukraine =

National artist cooperative of Ukraine

- Formation: 1938
- Type: Voluntary organisation
- Location: 1–5 L'vivs'ka Square, Kyiv, Ukraine
- Leader: Kostiantyn Cherniavskyi
- Website: nuau.org.ua

The National Union of Artists of Ukraine (Ukrainian: Спілка художників України, romanized: Spilka khudozhnykiv Ukrainy) (NUAU) is an artist cooperative headquartered in Kyiv, Ukraine, since 1991. This voluntary creative association consists of painters, graphic artists, sculptors, masters of decorative art and art critics.

== Recognition of the Union ==
The original name was the Union of Soviet Artists of Ukraine (USRU). In 1933, an organizing committee was created in Kharkiv, which prepared the creation of this Union.

In 1938, at the 1st Congress of Artists of the Ukrainian SSR, the Union of Soviet Artists of Ukraine was created as a part of the Artists' Union of the USSR.

On 7 September 1939, the Ukrainian SSR approved the statute of the Union of Soviet Artists of Ukraine. The charter defined the status of the union as a voluntary organization uniting the workers of fine arts on the territory of the Ukrainian SSR (painters, graphic artists, sculptors, theatre artists, folk art masters), as well as persons conducting research and critical work in this recognised field.

After Declaration of Independence of Ukraine on 26 December 1991, USRU was renamed the National Union of Artists of Ukraine (NUAU).

Since 1991 the National Union of Ukrainian Artists has published a quarterly illustrated magazine Fine Arts. It covers the current state and trends, history, theory, methodology, aesthetics, art education, practice, and general information about the fine arts of Ukraine.

In 1998 the Union was awarded its National status.

On the initiative of the National Union of Artists of Ukraine and other Ukrainian creative unions, the law on professional creative workers and creative unions have been changed. By decree of the President of Ukraine, a professional holiday named Artists Day which is dedicated to art was established.

== Congress ==
Founded in 1938 (originally named the Union of Soviet Artists of Ukraine) as the republican branch of the Union of Artists of the USSR. The foundation was preceded by five years of preparatory work of a special organizing committee established in 1933 in Kharkiv, which was then the capital of the Ukrainian USSR. The 1st congress was held in Kharkiv, the rest were held in Kyiv.

=== Congresses ===
- 1st – 1938
- 2nd – 1956
- 3rd – 1962
- 4th – 1968
- 5th – 1973
- 6th – 1977
- 7th – 1982

== Past chairmen ==
Here is a list of all presidents of the Union since its creation in 1938.

Chairmen	Years
Ivan Boichenko	(1938–41)
Oleksandr Pashchenko	(1941–44)
Vasyl Kasiyan	(1944–49)
Oleksii Shovkunenko	(1949–51)
Mykhaylo Khmelko	(1951–55)
Mykhailo Derehus	(1955–62)
Vasyl Borodai	(1968–82)
Oleksander Skoblykov	(1982–83)
Oleksandr Lopukhov	(1983–89)
Volodymyr Chepelyk	(1990–2021)
Kostiantyn Cherniavskyi	(elected 2021)

== See also ==
- National Union of Composers of Ukraine

== Sources ==
- Lopukhov O.M. Union of Artists of Ukraine // Ukrainian Soviet Encyclopedia : 12 tons / head. M.P. Bazhan; redkol.: O.K. Antonov, etc. — 2nd kind. – K. : Main edition of the URE, 1983. — T. 10 : Salyut – Stohiviz. — 543, [1] p., [36] arch. Il. : ill., table, port, maps + 1 arc s. — p. 461.
- 70th anniversary of the National Union of Artists of Ukraine / redkol.: Chepelyk V.A. and others; Order: Voloshchuk I.M., Bokovnya O.V. — Kyiv : National. union skinny. Ukraine, 2009. – 504 p.
