= Museums in Kyiv =

Museums in Kyiv, Ukraine include museums of art, history, transportation, and religion. They constitute an important aspect of Kyiv's focus on knowledge, culture, and history.

== Art museums ==
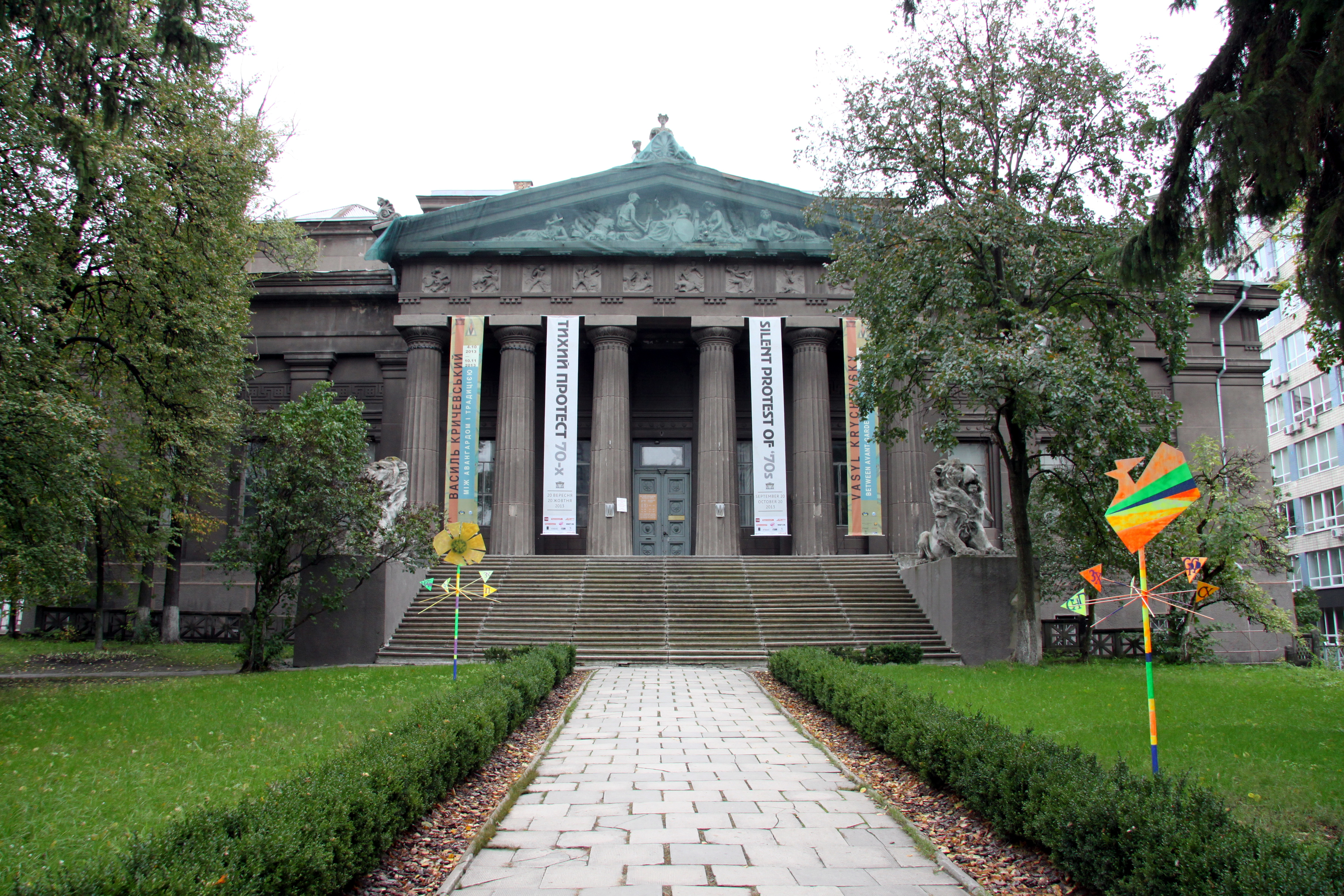
The National Art Museum of Ukraine

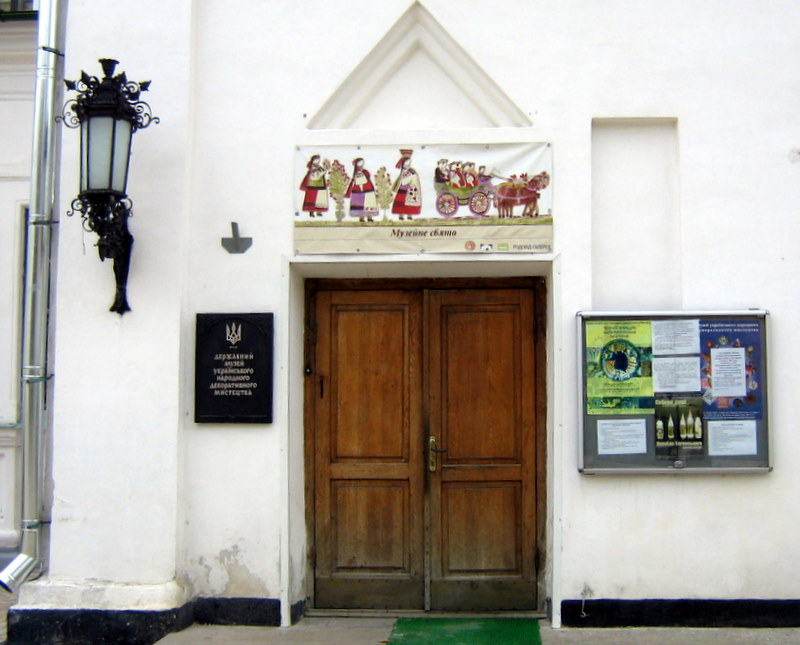
The National Folk Decorative Art Museum

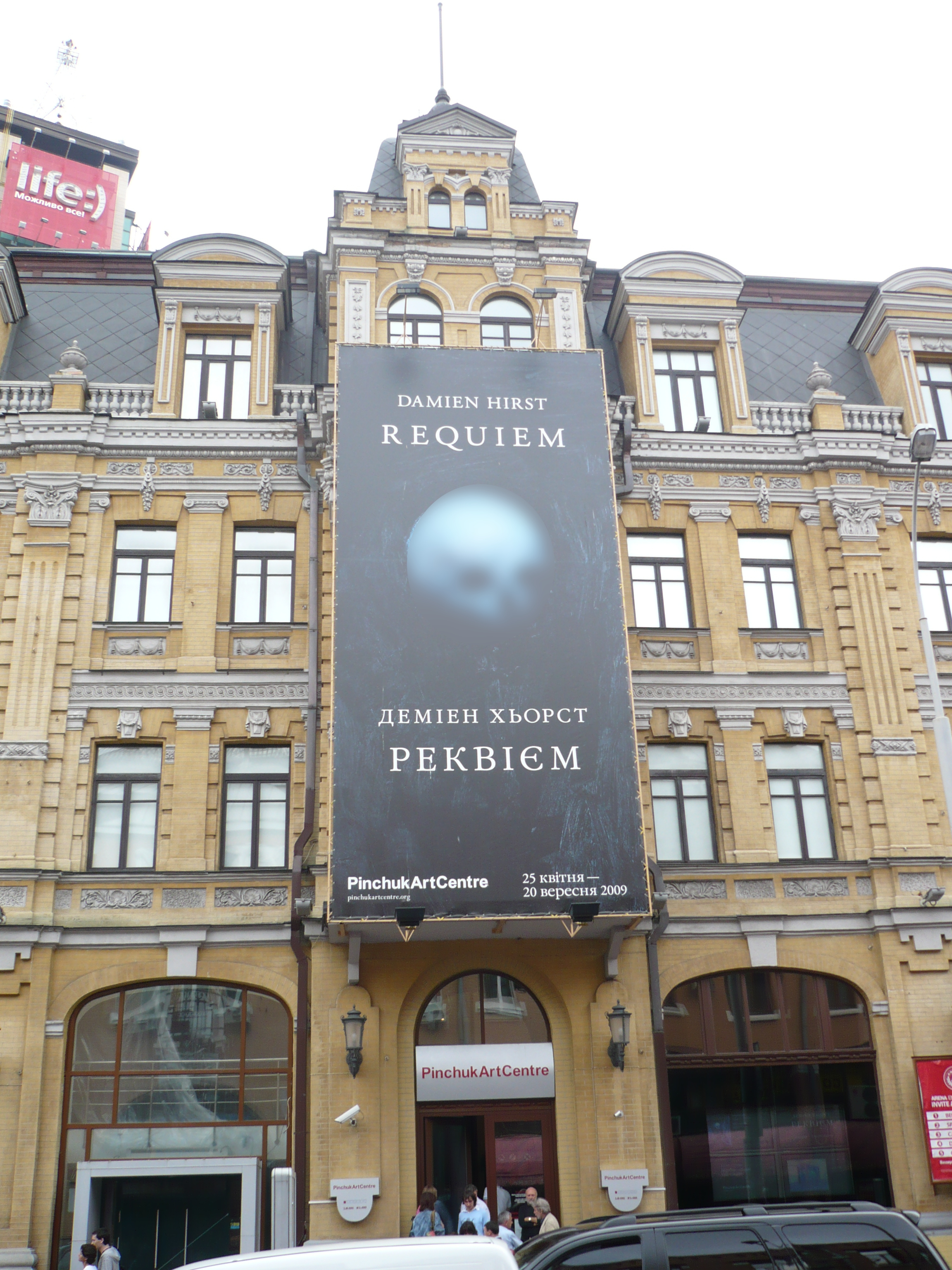
Pinchuk Art Centre

The National Art Museum of Ukraine is dedicated to Ukrainian art. Built in the 19th century, the museum has the appearance of a Greek temple. It was previously the Museum of History, which held many important historical artefacts. Following the nationalisation of all works of art in the Soviet Union, the museum acquired a large collection of artworks. The museum's exhibits are displayed in twenty-one galleries, representing the icons and sculpture of Ukraine, alongside paintings by artists such as Taras Shevchenko, Kyriak Kostandi, and Mykola Pymonenko. There are artefacts from the Medieval period (the 14th to 19th centuries),), the Romantic period (the 18th and 19th centuries), and the modern era. The museum possesses sketches by Shevchenko, paintings of the socialist era of the Soviet Union, and posters of the Revolutionary period. The museum houses the pre-19th century wooden icon of the 'Last Judgment', which was previously kept in Kyiv's St. Michael Monastery. The small icon of Saint George which was located in the store room of a museum in the Ukrainian city of Mariupol was restored by L.H. Chlenova and I.P. Dorofuenko and transferred to Kyiv, under the supervision of Nikolai V. Pertsev, who was also involved in the initial restoration of the museum.

The Pyrohovo Open Air Museum showcases Ukraine's folk decorative arts. It has churches, barns, windmills, huts, and craft exhibits. Guides dressed in regional village costume explain aspects of village life.

The Museum of Western and Oriental Art, also known as the Museum of Art of Bogdan and Varvara Khanenko, is a treasure house of artefacts from Ukraine and around the world. The museum possesses ceramics dating from the 9th century, and glazed tiles from the 14th to 17th centuries. There are some bronzes and embroidery work. In the western wing of the museum among the rare Byzantine antiquaries there is also an impressive painting of Hieronymus Bosch's Temptation of St Anthony. There are four unique religious artefacts dated from the 6th and 7th centuries on the top floor, and items of Greek sculpture. The eastern wing has exhibits of art related to Buddhism, Islam and Chinese culture. The building gives an impression of a bourgeois mansion, with post-Renaissance, Western European paintings and portraits by Rubens, Velázquez, Joshua Reynolds and Jacques-Louis David. The building is architecturally important and many pieces of furniture in the museum are pieces of art. The museum possesses an important 6th-century icon of Sergius and Bacchus, brought from Saint Catherine's Monastery on Mount Sinai by Bishop Uspensky.

Other art museums in Kyiv include the Pinchuk Art Centre, a museum dedicated to Eastern European art and culture, which is privately owned by Viktor Pinchuk. It is an international centre for the display of contemporary art. The Ivan Honchar Museum was established in Kyiv in September 1993 to exhibit the personal collection of Ivan Makarovych Honchar. Its aim is to promote the national culture of Ukraine, with an emphasis on Ukrainian art and ethnography. The Mystetskyi Arsenal is an art exhibition space.

== Cultural museums ==
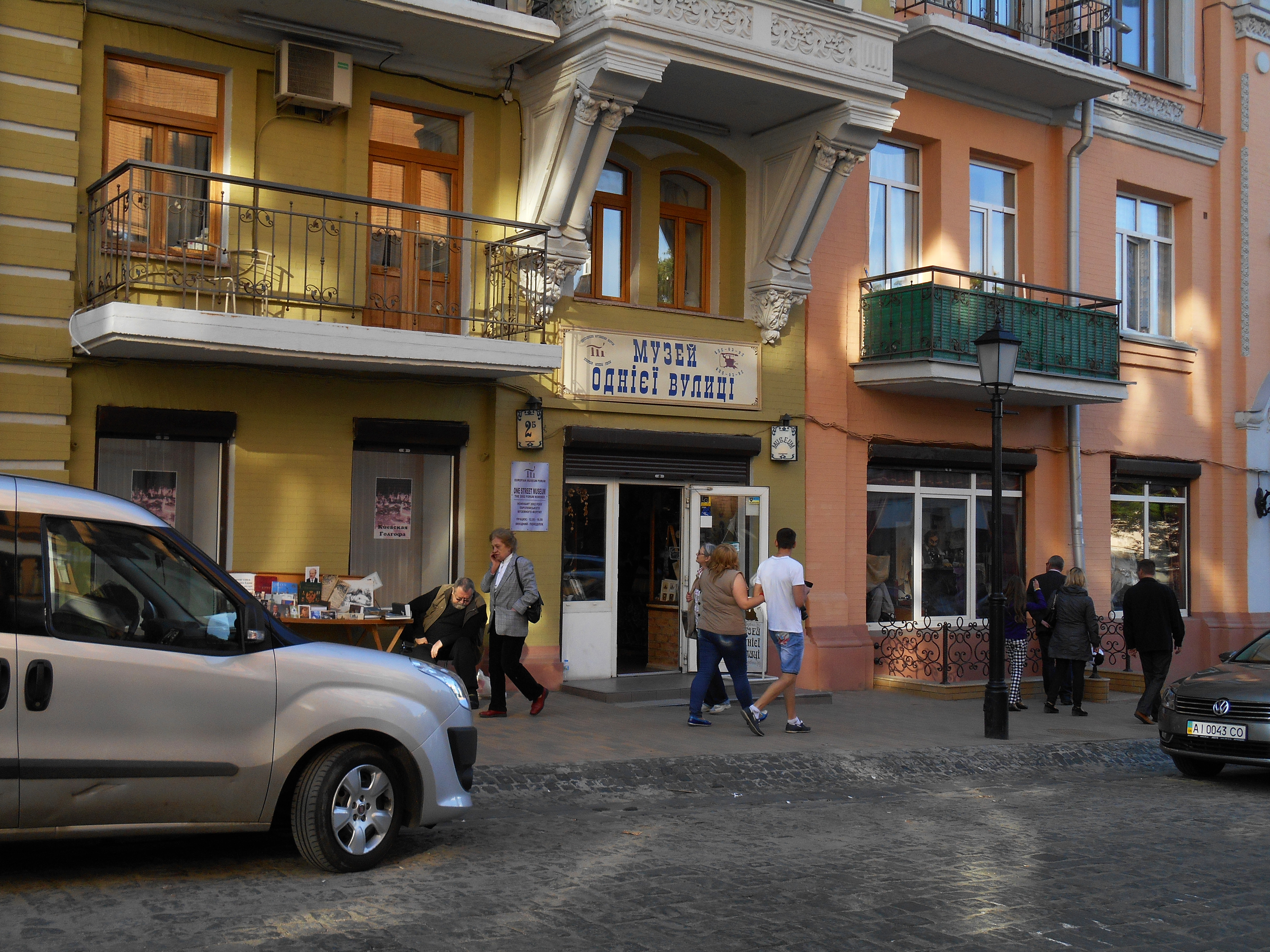
Entrance to the One Street Museum on Andriivskyi Descent

The Kudriavtsi manor museum dedicated to life in Kyiv during the first half of the 19th century is situated in the house a writer Mikhail Bulhakov used to live. Its exhibition is largely centered around another contemporary writer Alexander Pushkin with an intravital edition of “Yevgeniy Onegin” is among the exhibits. It contains author signs of the poet's friends and contemporaries – not just literary men, but also famous politicians and statesmen.

Other cultural museums include Mamayeva Sloboda, Mikhail Bulgakov Museum, Museum of Cultural Heritage in Kyiv, One Street Museum, Pyrohiv, Savka House and several museums dedicated to celebrities of Ukrainian Culture, primarily on writers, such as Museum of Outstanding Figures of Ukrainian Culture, Maxym Rylsky Museum, Pavlo Tychyna Museum, Mykhailo Hrushevsky Memorial Museum, Maria Zankovetska Museum. In addition, several churches have museums within their complexes, such as St Andrew's Church, St Sophia Cathedral, St Cyril Church, St Nicholas Cathedral, and Kyiv Pechersk Lavra.

The Ukraine National Beekeeping Museum in Kyiv is one of the largest beekeeping museums in the world.

== History museums ==
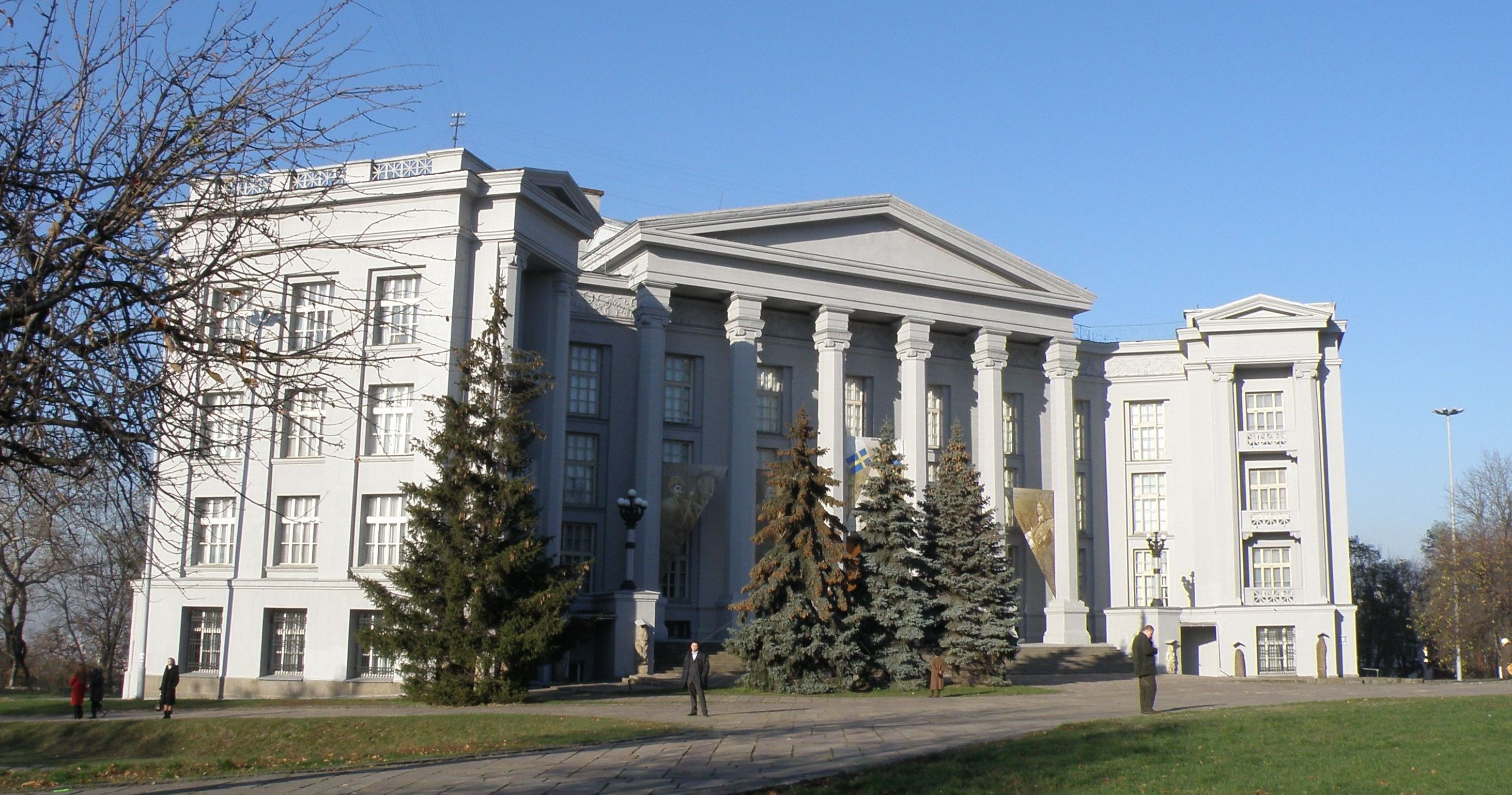
National Historical Museum of Ukraine

Kyiv fortress is a 19th-century fortification complex. The buildings later being used as barracks, and for storage and incarceration facilities. The Kosyi Kaponir became a prison for the political inmates in the 1900s–1920s and was later turned into a Soviet museum, now a Ukrainian modern museum. A small fortress built in 1872 on Lysa Hora (Bald Mountain), and in 1906 became a place of executions for convicted political inmates. It is now a landscape reserve and part of the museum complex.

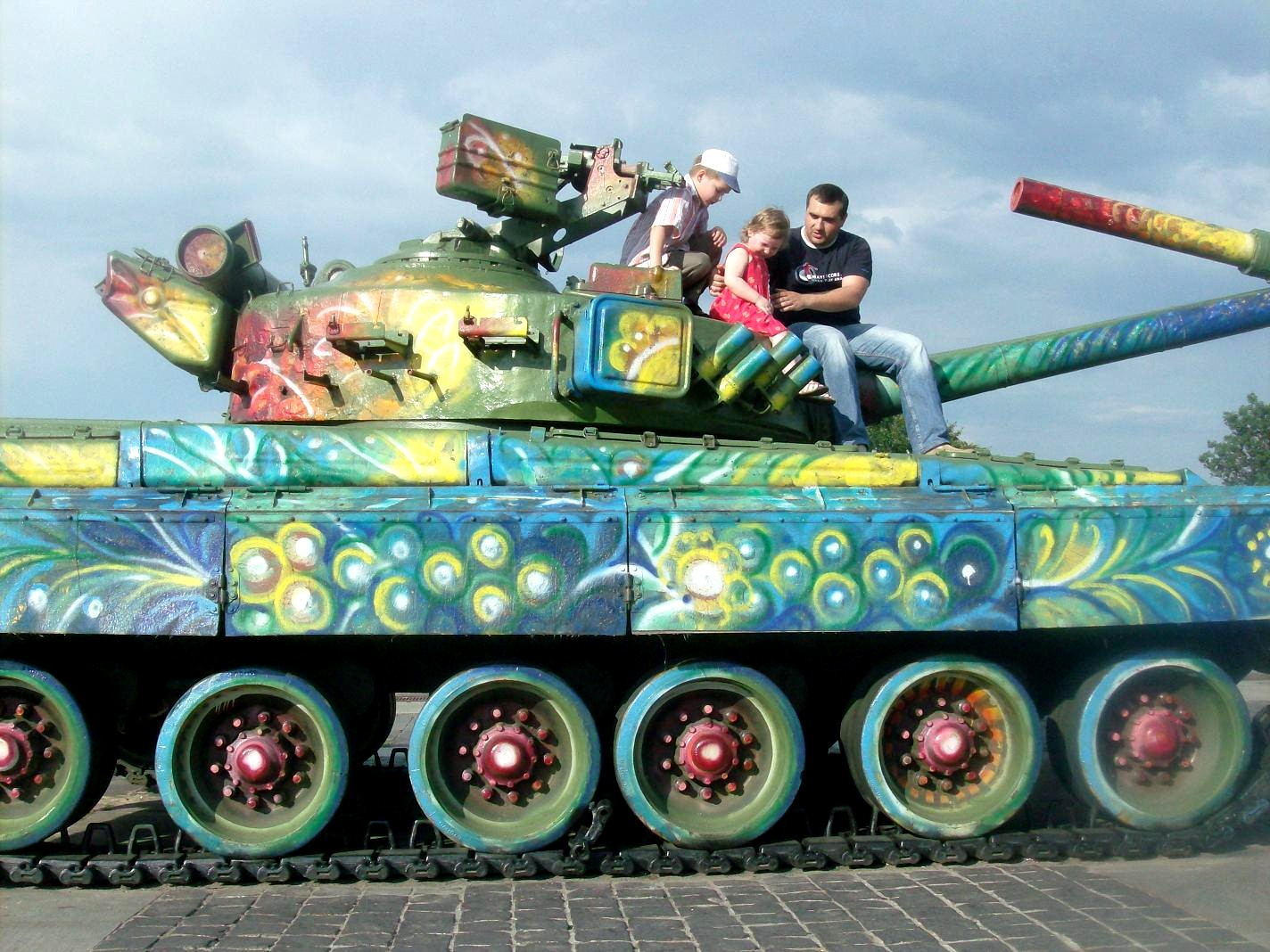
Museum of The History of Ukraine in World War II

The Museum of The History of Ukraine in World War II is a complex which commemorates the Eastern Front of World War II. Its collection consists of about 300,000 pieces, and it has been visited by over 24 million visitors.

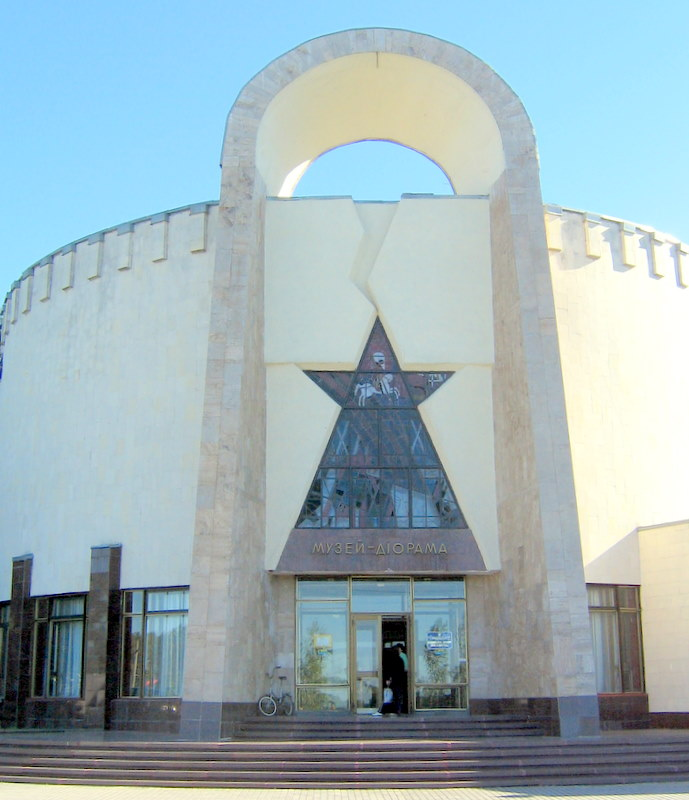
National Museum-Preserve "Battle for Kyiv 1943"

The National Museum-Preserve "Battle for Kyiv 1943" is dedicated to the Kyiv Strategic Offensive Operation of autumn 1943. The museum exposition narrates the events of the autumn of 1943, the Battle of the Dnieper and the Lyutezh Offensive Operation during the Battle of Kiev (1943). The Ukrainian National Chernobyl Museum in Podil is a striking display of the tragedy of the nuclear disaster. The symbolic representation of many old road signs of the deserted towns and cities are stated to give an eerie feeling, and there are a number of Surrealist pictures of the disaster.

The National Historical Museum of Ukraine is a national heritage museum dedicated to the theme of Ukrainian independence. The museum highlights the struggle for independence tracing back from the Slavic times to the present. The museum, which opened in 1904, was shifted to Kyiv-Pechersk Lavra in 1935 and later during the war to Ufa, and after the war the collections were moved back to Kyiv to the present location. It has many archeological artifacts found locally, apart from ethnographical and numismatic exhibits, paintings and sculptures, old books and many other artifacts. The exhibits also trace the ancient history of Ukraine from the time of Trypillya settlements, weaponry of ancient Polovtsy, artifacts of Kievan Rus period, the Soviet rule and also of the Orange Revolution, and to the present. Exhibits related to nationally renowned dancer Serge Lifar are also on display here. The first foundation stone of the church in Kyiv, built in 989, is located in the precincts of the museum. The church was destroyed by the Mongols in 1240 and was never reconstructed.

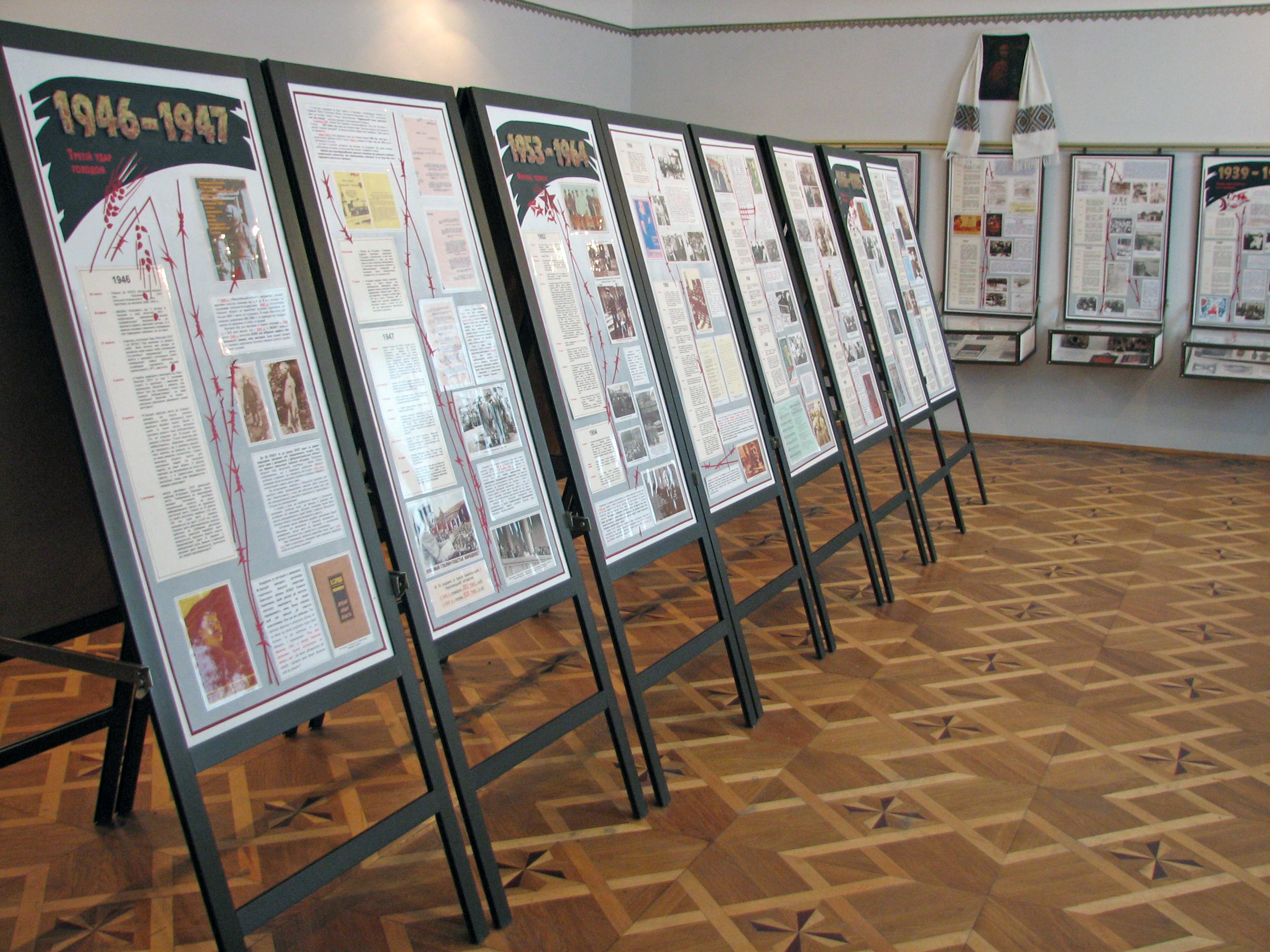
Exhibition of the Museum of Soviet Occupation, Kyiv

The Kyiv Archive Museum of Transitional Period was a brief Nazi propaganda museum that was established by German occupants in Ukraine in 1942. to October 1942. The expositions were oriented specifically to "achievements" of the German occupation and crimes of Joseph Stalin's regime. The museum's director was the Ukrainian historian and former mayor Oleksandr Ohloblyn who used this opportunity to organize an exhibition about cultural monuments destroyed by Bolsheviks. Several historians, such as Oleksandr Hruzynsky, Svitozar Drahomanov, Natalia Polonska-Vasylenko etc., were appointed scientific advisors of the museum, but it was not very successful, and was soon closed and did not reopen.

The Toilet History Museum, located in the Kyiv Fortress, opened in 2006. It contains the largest collection of toilet-related souvenirs in the world and chronicles the history of the toilet from pre-biblical times to the present.

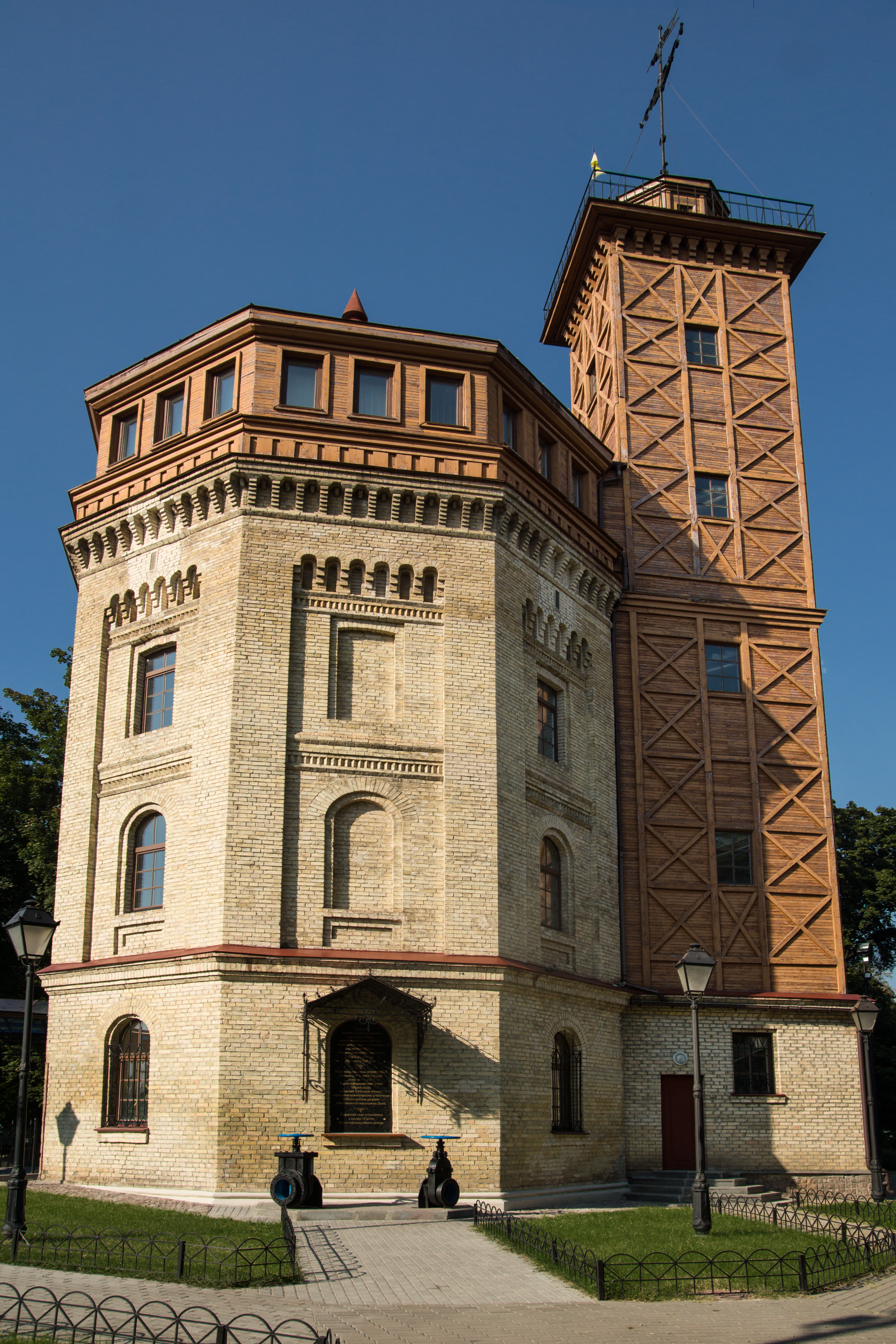
Kyiv Water Museum

== Infrastructure museums ==
There are several museums dedicated to the city's infrastructure, including Building of Pedagogical Museum, Kyiv Fire Service Museum, Kyiv Pharmacy Museum, Kyiv Recycling Museum, Kyiv Sewer Museum, Kyiv Water Museum, and the National Museum of Health Care in Kyiv.

The Water Museum (Water-information Centre) is one of the most popular cultural institutions in Kyiv. It is located in the very centre of the city in Khreshchatyi Park. The Water Museum was established in 2003 in order to improve people's awareness about water resources and their value for the community.

== Natural history museums ==
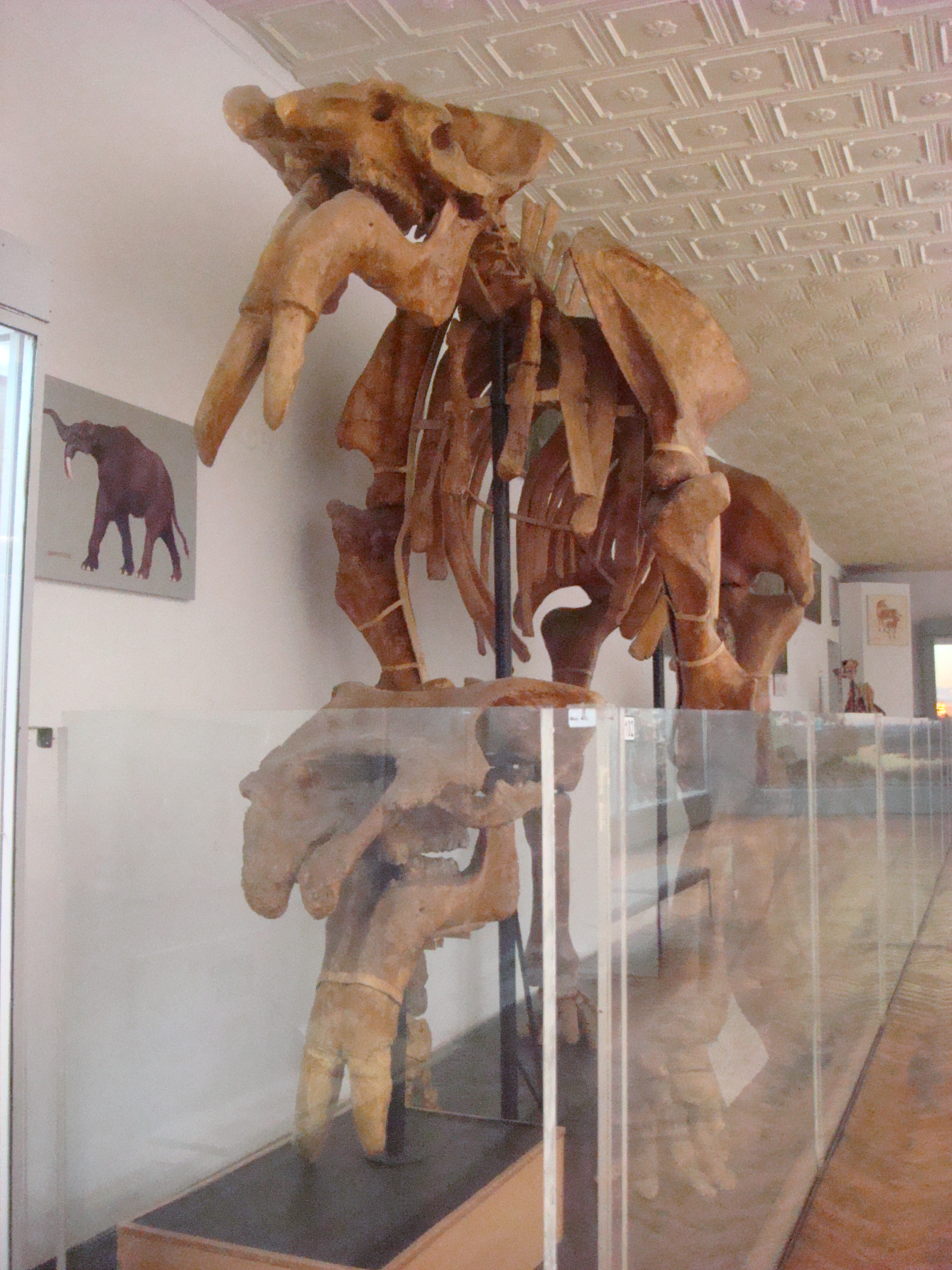
Deinotherium skeleton at the National Museum of Natural History

The National Museum of Natural History at the National Academy of Sciences of Ukraine is Ukraine's biggest natural history museum and one of the biggest establishments of this type in the world. It consists of 24 exhibition halls and includes over 30,000 exposition pieces related to the history, evolution and structure of the Earth, flora and fauna, as well as material culture of humans which have historically populated the territory of Ukraine. The museum was created in 1966 through the merger geological, palaeontological, zoological, botanical and archaeological museums. In 1996 it was awarded the status of national museum of Ukraine.

The Kyiv Jellyfish Museum is a private museum established in 2018 in an underground space under Maidan Nezalezhnosti. Created in place of a former public toilet, the creation of the museum initially caused controversy, but its exposition presenting live jellyfish in an illuminated aquarium and accompanied with electronic music soon became popular among visitors. Due to power outages during the Russian invasion of Ukraine, the museum's collection was destroyed several times, but revived thanks to the use of electric generators. The museum offers a discount for army servicemen and is especially popular among children.

== Transportation museums ==
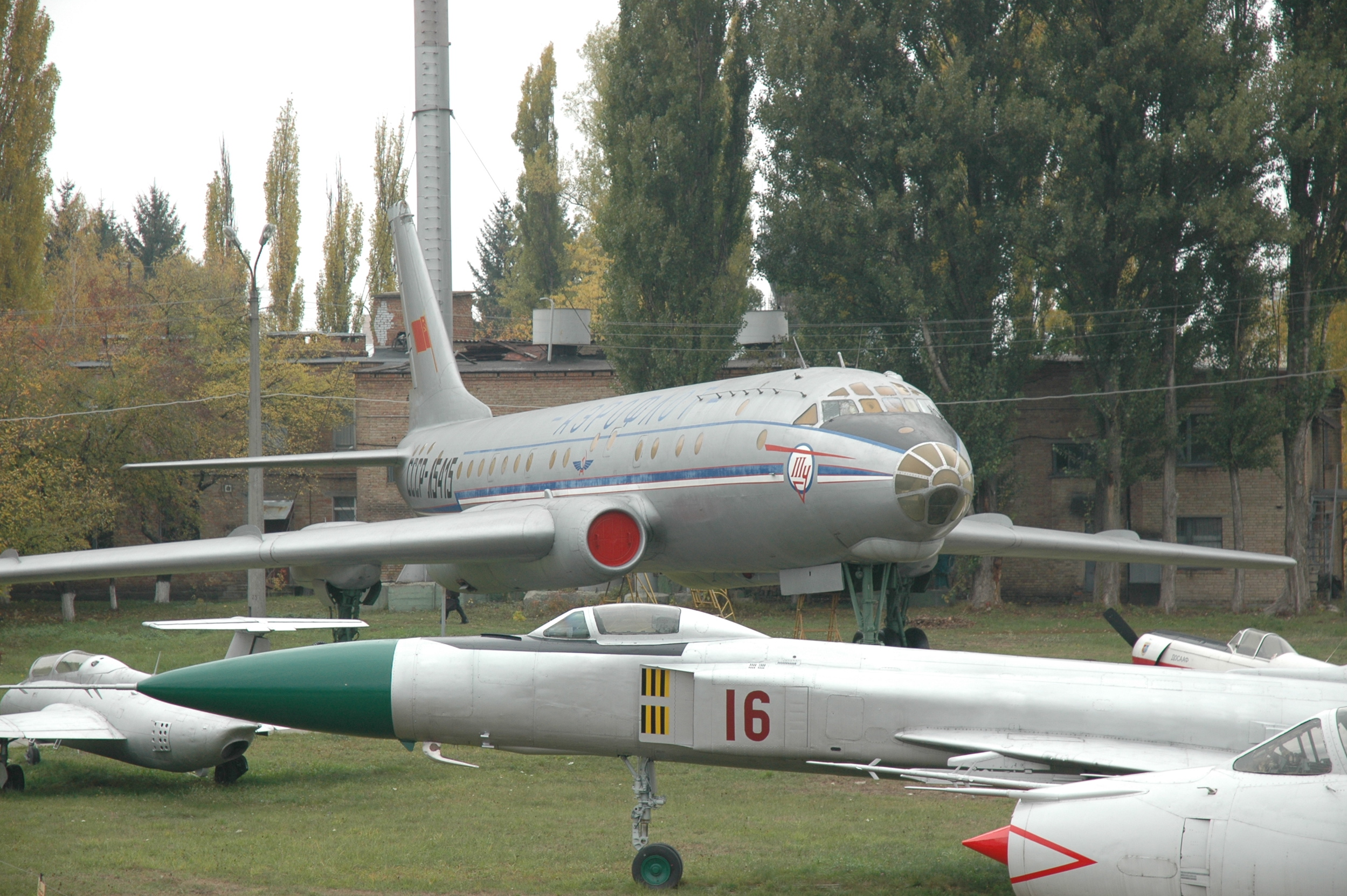
Vintage aircraft on display at the Ukraine State Aviation Museum, Kyiv

The Ukraine State Aviation Museum is an aviation museum located next to Zhulyany Airport in Kyiv, which was inaugurated on 30 September 2003 by Leonid Kuchma, the President of Ukraine at the time. Its location was formerly the Educational Air Base of KIIGA. The museum offers some 70 exhibits on aircraft and helicopters, growing from an initial collection of about 30. The museum is one of the larger aviation museums displaying items related to Soviet aircraft development in the 20th century. On display is an exclusive "Backfire Collection" including Tu-22M missile-bombers, MiGs, and Jets etc. The primary functional parts of aircraft on display in the museum are stated to be in working condition.

The Kyiv Railway Museum is situated at the Kyïv-Passazhirskyi Station. The Kyiv Museum of Electric Transportation, originally Kyiv Tram History Museum, was founded in 1992, The Kyiv Subway Museum is also of note.
