= Maria Bri-Bein =

Soviet Russian poster artist (1892–1968)

- Мария Бри-Бейн
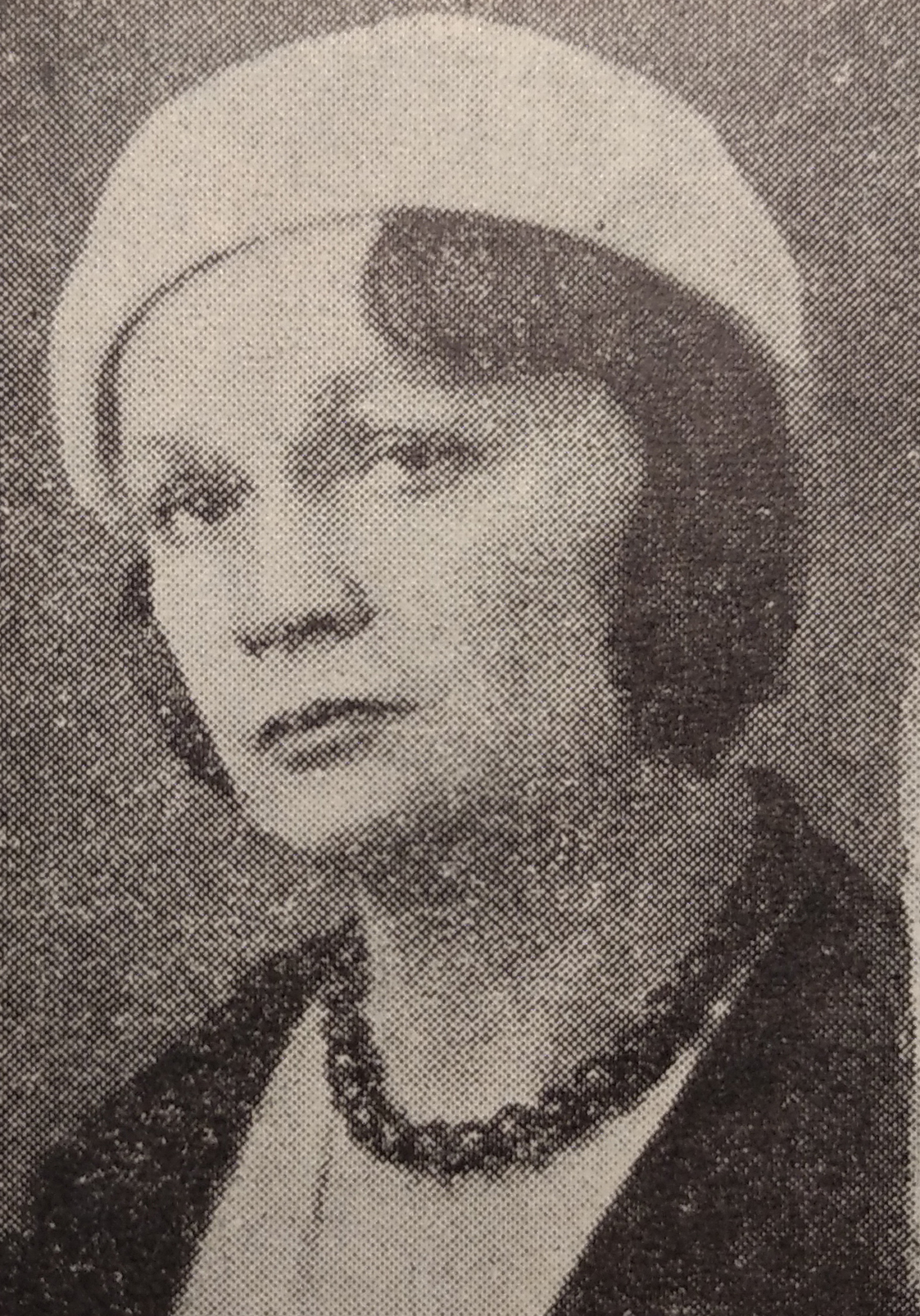
- Bri-Bein in 1933
- Born: Maria Feliksova Bri-Bein; 1892; Odesa, Russian Empire
- Died: 1968 (aged 75–76); Moscow, Soviet Union

Maria Feliksova Bri-Bein (Russian: Мария Феликсовна Бри-Бейн; 1892–1968) was a Soviet Russian poster artist active in the 1930s.

Her art has been held at the MoMA since 2018, and was included in the 2020 exhibition "Engineer, Agitator, Constructor". Her art was also featured in the 2014 exhibition "Little Vera" at the Contemporary Art Centre in Riga, Latvia.

== Biography ==
Bri-Bein was born in Odesa, then part of the Russian Empire. She studied with Kyriak Kostandi at the Odessa College of Art from 1910-1915. In 1917, Bri-Bein began to exhibit professionally and became a member of TIURKH (Association of Southern Russian Artists), which she would continue to be a part of until 1919. Beginning in 1924, she also studied with Ilya Mashkov.

She was a member of AKhRR (Association of Artists of Revolutionary Russia) from 1926-1932.

Bri-Bein began producing political posters in 1930. Her political posters in the first half of the decade have been described as feminist for their depictions of "steely, uniformed women capably performing various challenging tasks". In 1934, she won first prize at the Izogiz State Publishing House's exhibition Ten Years Without Lenin with her 1932 poster Narody SSSR (Peoples of the USSR). By the late 1930s, in line with larger political and artistic shifts, Bri-Bein began to depict women in her posters in more traditionally feminine ways.

Bri-Bein's early work is "in a more angular, modernist style reminiscent of Popova and Stepanova," while her later work has more rounded figures.
