= Bulgakov Museum =

Bulgakov Museum may refer to:

- Bulgakov Museum in Moscow, Russia
- Mikhail Bulgakov Museum, Kiev, Ukraine
- Bulgakov exposition in the One Street Museum, Kiev, Ukraine
