= Theriological School =

Ukrainian public organization

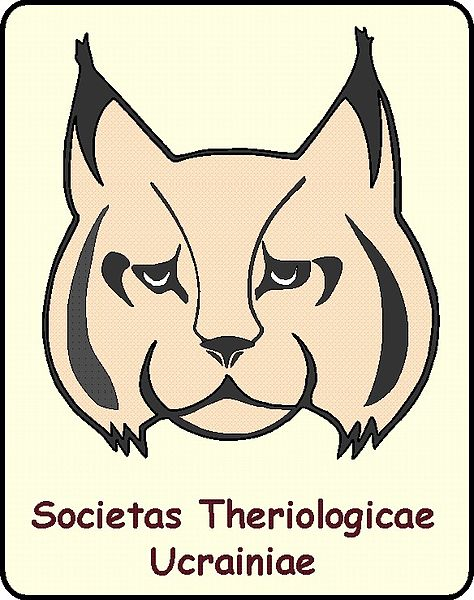
- Founded: 1993 (24.11.93 р.)
- Founder: Igor Zagorodniuk
- Type: Public organization
- Purpose: Zoology, mammalogy, nature conservation
- Location: Ukraine
- Members: more than 200
- Website: Theriological school

The Theriological School is a professional and educational network that unites specialists in mammalogy of Ukraine and adjacent countries Poland, Belarus, Estonia, Russia, and Romania. The school holds annual meetings for its members.

== History ==
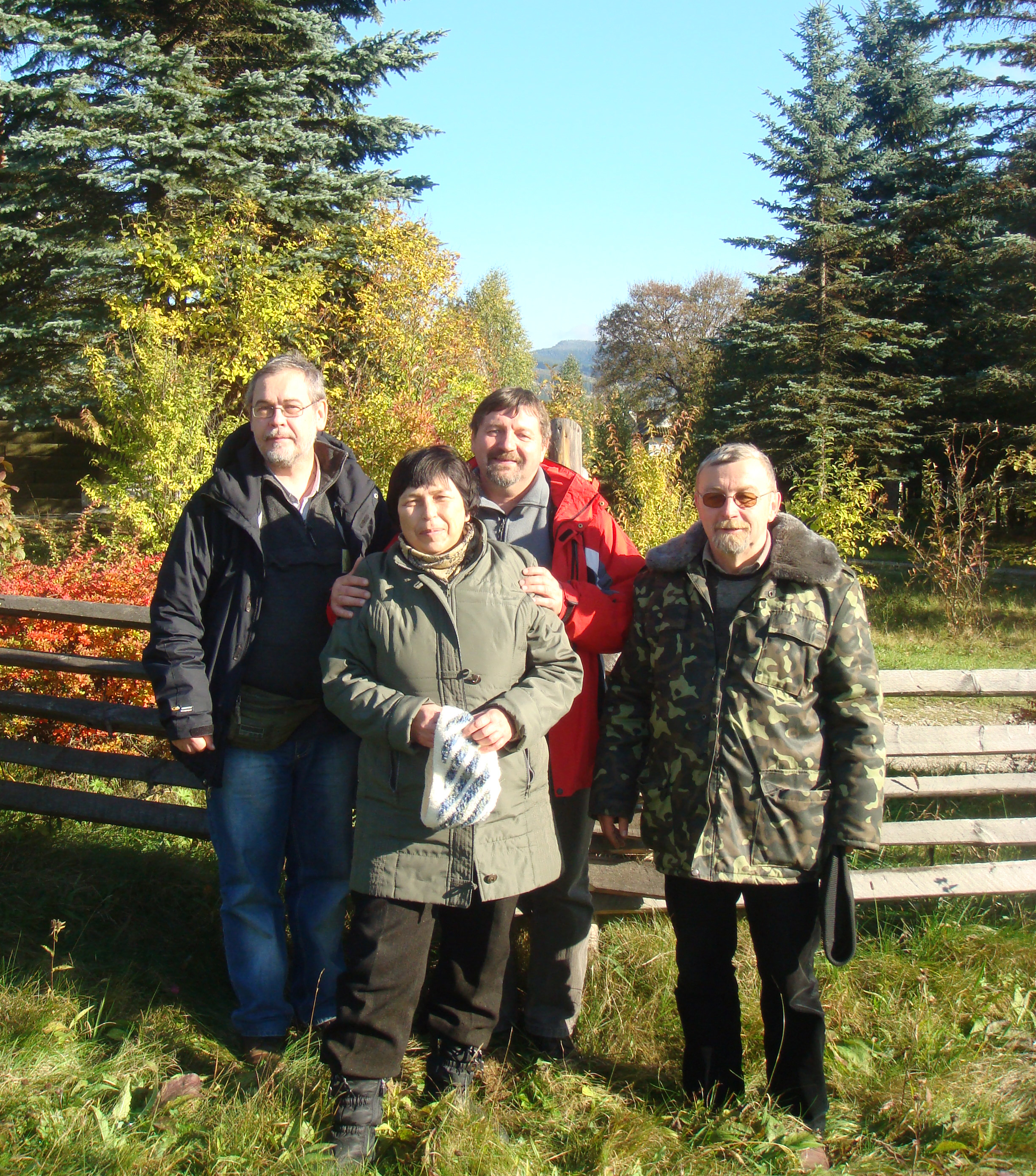
Founders of Theriological school: Igor Zagorodniuk, Zoya Selulina, Vasyl Pokynchereda, Oleksandr Kislyuk), Carpathian National Nature Park, 2013

Theriological School was started as one of the sections of the Ukrainian Theriological Society (UTS) of the National Academy of Sciences of Ukraine (NAS) on 24 November 1993 by a joint decision of three institutions: the Ukrainian Theriological Society, the Ministry of Nature Conservation, and the Commission on the Reserves of the NAS of Ukraine. Since its foundation, Therioschool became one of the main activities of the UTS. Igor Zagorodniuk, deputy head of the UTS, is one of the initiators of the creation and a leading figure of Theriological School (together with O. Fedorchenko, O. Kiselyuk and V. Pokinchereda).

The first newsletter was distributed on 24 November 1993. The initial annual conference took place on 3 October 1994 at Carpathian Biosphere Reserve. The first issue of the journal Proceedings of the Theriological School was published in 1998 and presented at the National University of Kharkiv. In 2000, the newsletter was converted to a bulletin titled Novitates Theriologicae. A website for the Ukrainian Theriological Society was created on 25 May 2003.

All activities of Theriological School are managed entirely by its Board and its regular participants. The Board organizes each seminar, which typically takes place in one of the nature or biosphere reserves, or at biological stations of one of the universities. Occasionally, conferences are held in cities with universities, institutes, or museums of natural history (e.g., the XII Terioschool in Luhansk, XIII in Kamianets-Podilskyi, and XXIV in Odesa).

== Objectives ==
The concept of the Theriological School was formulated in the journal Nature Reserves in Ukraine (1999). The key tasks, developed by all 24 schools, are:

- Organizing regular meetings for zoologists working at nature reserves, national parks, biological stations, and natural science faculties of universities and academic institutions
- Exchanging experiences in conducting field studies of mammals
- Unifying methodology for theriological investigations (research on species composition of local fauna)
- Approving scientific results;
- Developing activities to promote nature protection and education;
- Creating and maintaining publications and other platforms for sharing experiences, including the forum "Theriological School" , the website "Therioschool" , the bulletin Novitates Theriologicae (8 issues), and the journal Proceedings of the Theriological School (15 volumes).

== Forms and scheme of work ==
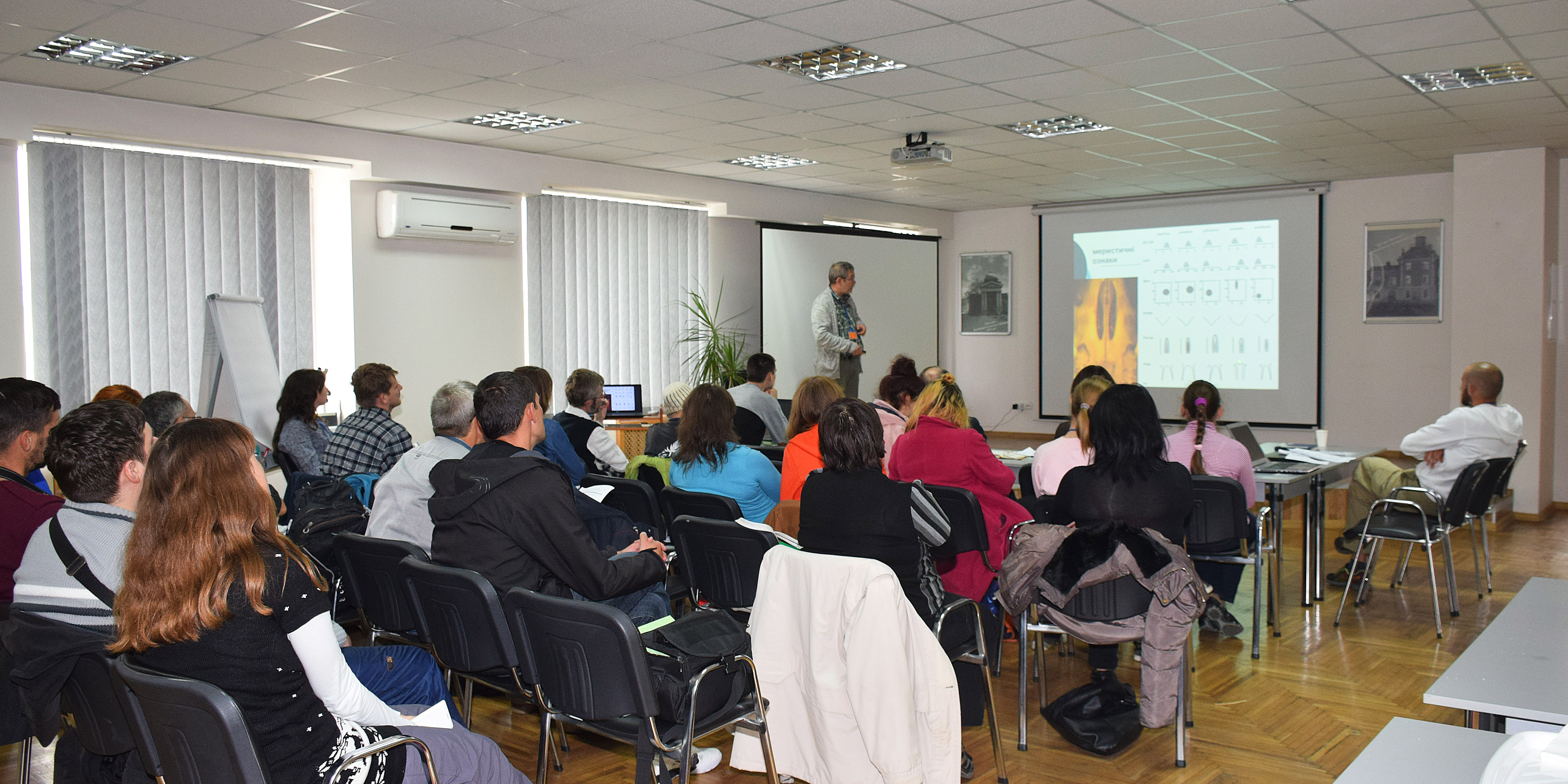
Lecture by Igor Zagorodniuk (XXIV Therioschool, Odesa, 2017)

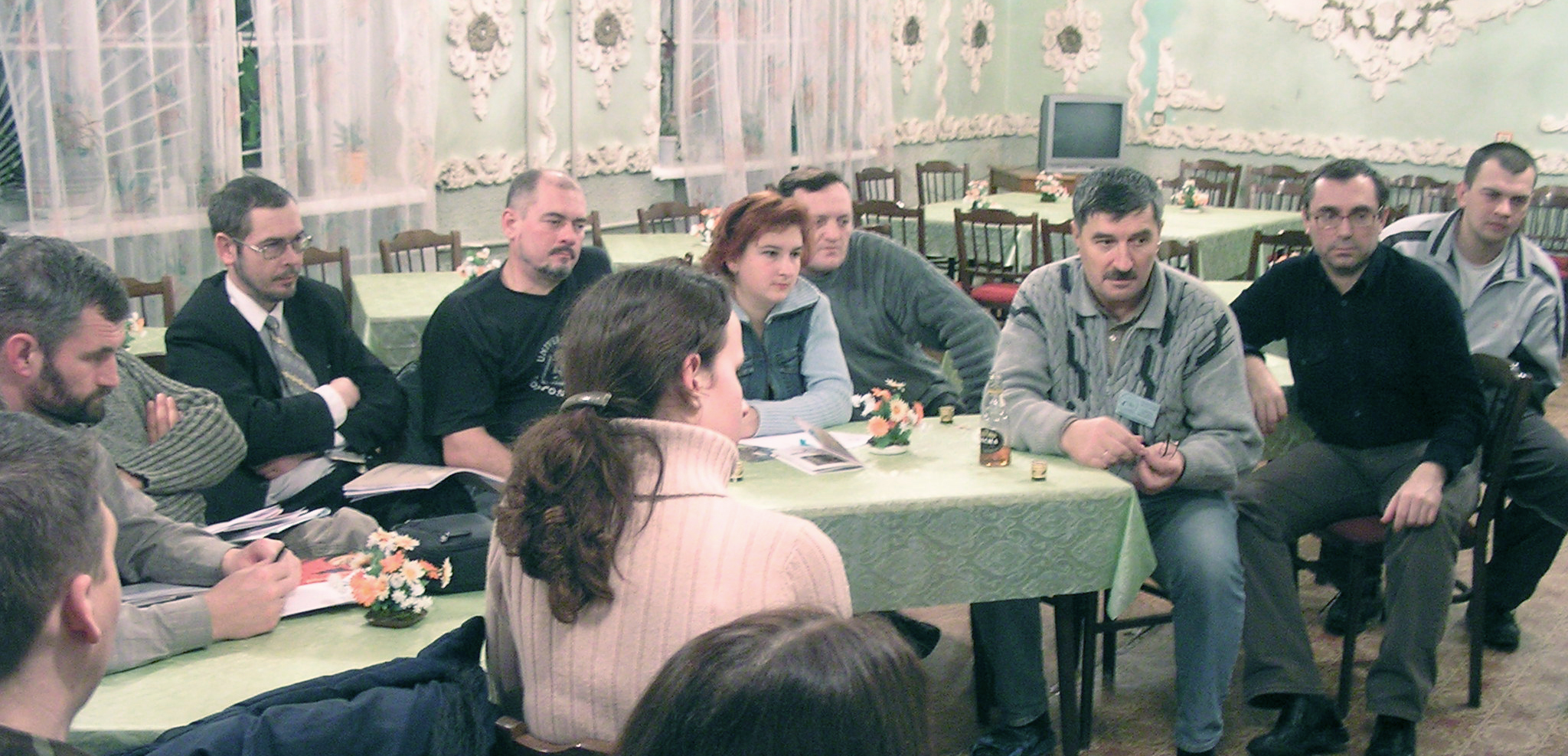
A round-table during Teriological School (XII Therioschool, Luhansk, 2005)

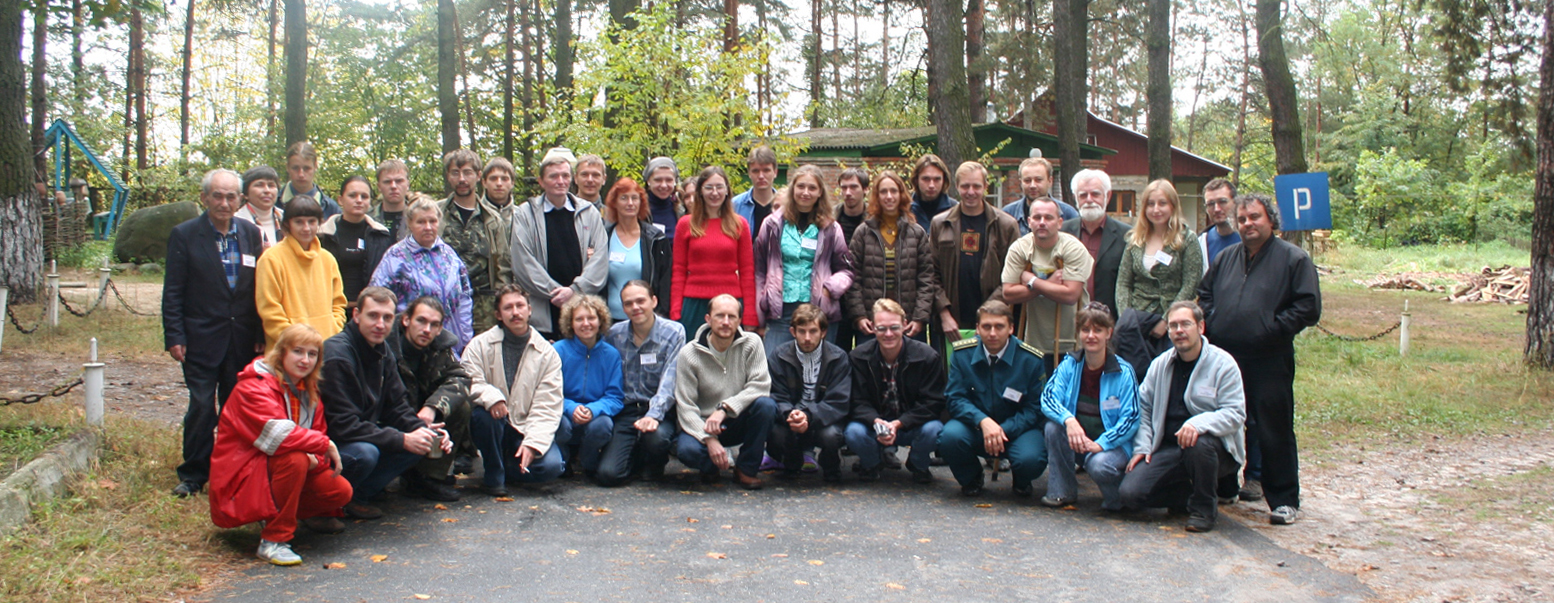
The participants of XIV Therioschool (near Chornobyl zone, 2007)

Therioschool exists in two main forms: as a network of professionals and as an annual seminar (workshop). The network includes more than 200 respondents from Ukraine, Belarus, Poland, Estonia, Moldova, Romania, Hungary (listed in descending order by participation). The seminar typically gathers about 30–70 participants and lasts an average of five days.

The school follows a uniform scheme, detailed on the society's website . Main features include:

- Duration: One week (usually late September to early October)
- Theme: Each year focuses on one main topic, with sessions and activities organized around it for at least two days, including lectures and master-classes
- Round tables and master classes: One to two per day, covering faunistic records, database maintenance, the assessment of population status, GIS technologies, and more
- Field classes and excursions: Visits to monitoring sites, accounting lines, etc.
- Information fairs, competitions, and other activities.

== Journal ==
The Journal of the Theriological School, originally titled Proceedings of the Theriological School (PTS), is registered in the International Center for Registration of Scientific Publications with ISSN 2312-2749 (print) and ISSN 2074-2274 (online). In 2018, the journal changed its title to Theriologia Ukrainica.

PTS was approved by the Higher Attestation Commission of Ukraine (VAK) in 2016 as a professional publication eligible to publish the results of investigations for dissertation works. All articles submitted to PTS undergo three reviews: a primary review from the editorial board and two independent expert peer reviews.

Since 1998, 15 volumes of PTS were published (averaging 170–180 pages each), with each volume containing an average of 18–22 articles.

In accordance with Web of Science requirements, each volume and article has its own homepage with a detailed English summary. Each article includes an abstract, keywords, figure and table legends, and a bibliography–all in English. Each volume features at least 4–7 full articles written in English.

As of 20 October 2020, according to Google Scholar, there are 1,623 citations of 308 articles from PTS. The journal's h-index is 16, and its i10 index (the number of articles cited at least 10 times) is 40. These metrics are higher than those of most Ukrainian journals.
