= National Museum of Natural History at the National Academy of Sciences of Ukraine =

Natural history museum in Kyiv, Ukraine

National Museum of Natural History of the National Academy of Sciences of Ukraine
- Національний науково-природничий музей НАН України
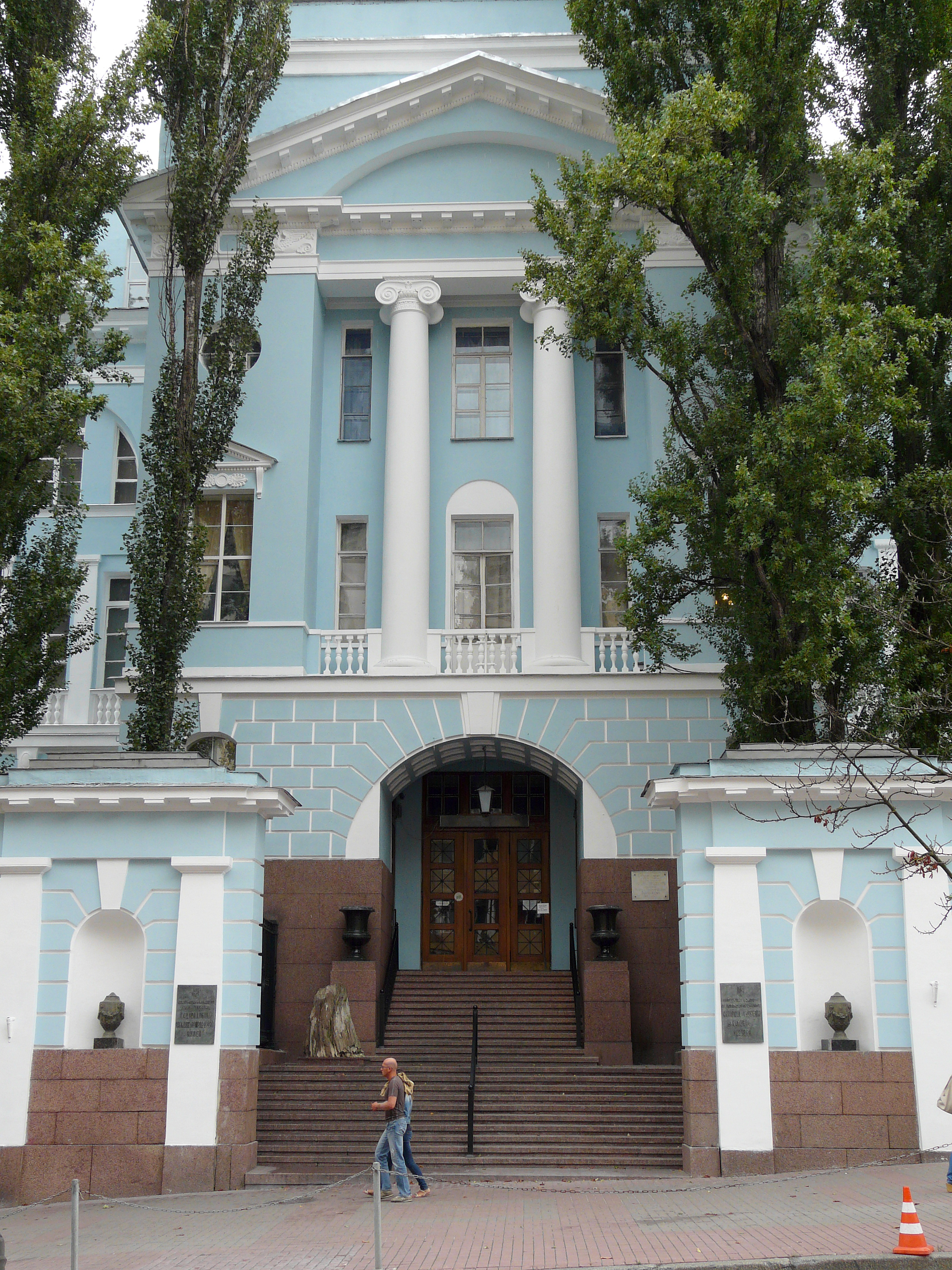
- Established: 8 June 1966; 59 years ago
- Location: 15 Bohdan Khmelnitsky (M. "Teatralna"), Kyiv, 01054, Ukraine
- Coordinates: 50°26′43″N 30°30′53″E
- Visitors: ~ 100,000
- Director: Igor Emelyanov
- Website: www.museumkiev.org

The National Museum of Natural History of the National Academy of Sciences of Ukraine (Ukrainian: Національний науково-природничий музей НАН України, romanized: Natsionalnyi naukovo-pryrodnychyi muzei NAN Ukrainy) is a natural history museum in the Ukrainian capital Kyiv. It is one of the largest scientific research museums of its type.

== History of the museum ==
The museum is housed in a former building of the Olgynska School, built in 1914–1927 in the neoclassical style. It was granted the status of the National Museum on December 10, 1996, according to the decision of the President of Ukraine.

== Structure of displays ==
The museum was established in 1966 as a unified complex comprising five museum sections: Geological, Paleontological, Zoological, Botanical, and Archaeological. There are approximately 30,000 exhibits in 24 halls with a total area of 8,000 m². The museum is open from Thursday to Sunday from 11 am to 6 pm.

== Proceedings ==
The museum publishes two annual journals:

- Theriologia Ukrainica (formerly as Proceedings of the Theriological School) ISSN 2219-7516 (Print)
  - Editor-in-chief: Igor Zagorodniuk
- Geo&Bio (formerly as Proceedings of National Museum of Natural History) ISSN 2312-2749 (Print); ISSN 2074-2274 (Online)
  - Editor-in-chief: Maryna Komar

== See also ==
- National Academy of Sciences of Ukraine
- Museums in Kyiv
