= Igor Zagorodniuk =

Igor Volodymyrovych Zagorodniuk
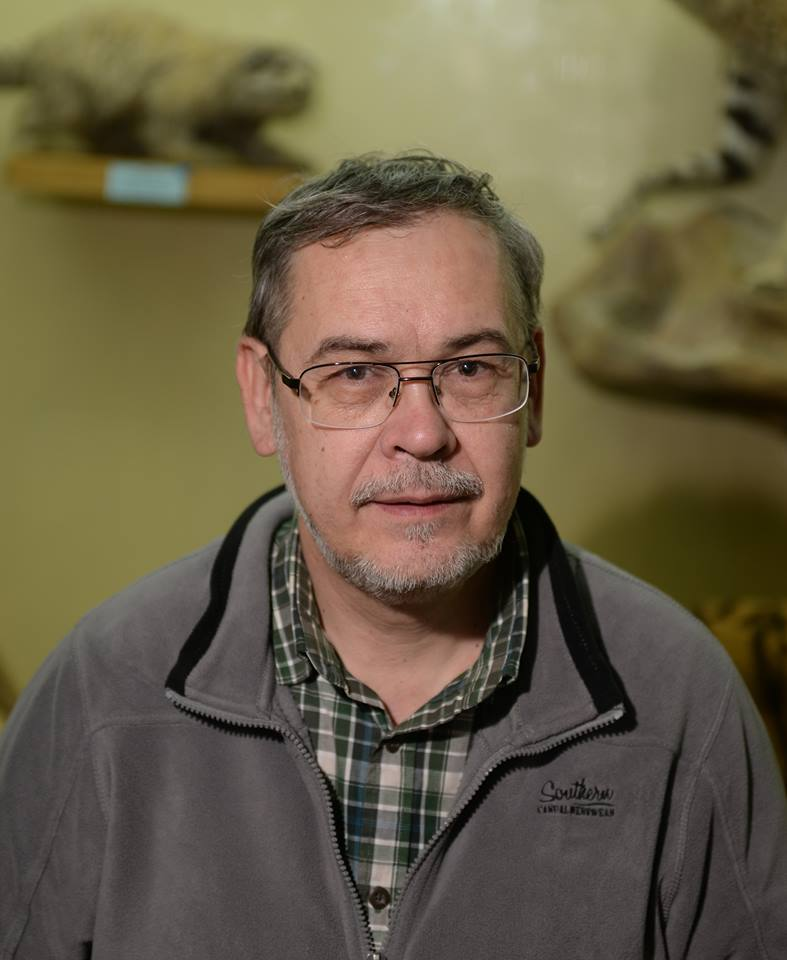
- Born: March 11, 1961 (age 65); Kiev, Ukraine
- Education: Kiev University
- Known for: zoological investigations, ecology, nature conservation, Theriological school
- Awards: State Prize of Ukraine in the field of science and technology
- Scientific career
- Fields: evolutionary biology, zoology, mammals biodiversity ecology
- Workplaces: I. I. Schmalhausen Institute of Zoology, International Solomon University, Uzhhorod National University, University of Luhansk, National Museum of Natural History

Igor Zagorodniuk is a Ukrainian zoologist, mammalogist, ecologist, and founder of Theriological school. He is a laureate of the State Prize of Ukraine in the field of science and technology (2015), and the author of more than 500 scientific publications.

== The beginning of zoological research ==
I. Zagorodniuk started his zoological research in ornithology when he was a student of Taras Shevchenko National University of Kyiv. His diploma project at University (and also the intermediate works) was devoted to the study of migrations and flying of birds.

Also, being a University student, I. Zagorodniuk started the study of amphibians (their hybrid zones in particular), conducted the experiments on biotope association of the amphibian group Bombina bombina – Bombina variegata, and also conducted experiments on the energy of Bombina species in winter time and the influence of wintering on the age structure of this species populations. At the same time, I. Zagorodniuk started the study of karyotypes of amphibians and rodents. When he began his work at I. I. Schmalhausen Institute of Zoology, the subject of his research was shifted towards the study of rodents. The first publication on this subject was devoted to the karyotypic variability of Microtus arvalis.

The results of this research became the basis of justification of the species independence for Microtus arvalis — M. obscurus. This became one of the results of PhD research by I. Zagorodniuk and the subject of the most cited publication by the scientist.

== Taxonomic investigations ==
Taxonomic investigations make up a significant part of the scientific work of I. Zagorodniuk. This investigations were shifted from a description of small taxa to the group analysis and the discovery of patterns of formation and existence of low and high levels of taxonomic diversity. In this investigation, considerable attention is given to the groups of evolutionary and morphologically close species, primarily rodents. As a result of this cycle of research, 8 new taxa were described and a significant number of taxonomic permutations were proposed.

The following taxa are described as new to science:

- Volemys Zagorodnyuk, 1990
- Apodemini Zagorodnjuk, 2001
- Sorex minutus dahli
- Apodemus (Sylvaemus) falzfeini (later the geographical boundaries have been substantially expanded, which eventually led to a change in the scientific name, and the described form is now a subspecies Sylvaemus witherbyi falzfeini)
- Microtus rossiaemeridionalis ponticus
- Sylvaemus sylvaticus sabinae
- Terricola tatricus zykovi
- Arvicola scherman gutsulius
- Eptesicus lobatus

Besides the taxa described for the first time, the researcher also substantiated the species, subfamily or generic statuses of a number of other taxa, which names were known as synonyms of other species or genera for a long period of time.

- Sylvaemus uralensis (Pallas, 1811) — is currently recognized as a separate species that includes Apodemus microps (its dіstribution was recognized only in Central Europe, now - on Ural and Altai).
- Mus spicilegus Petenyi, 1882 — is currently recognized as a separate species that was a part of Mus musculus.
- Microtus obscurus (Eversmann, 1845) — is currently recognized as a separate species or a group of subspecies of the species Microtus arvalis.
- Arvicola scherman (Shaw, 1801) — is currently recognized as a separate species or group of subspecies of the species Arvicola amphibius (the last name was also returned in use on the basis of the review of the superspecies «Arvicola terrestris»).
- Sicista loriger (Nathusius, 1840) — is currently recognized as a separate species or group of the subspecies of the species Sicista subtilis.
- Sylvaemus Ognev, 1924 — is currently recognized as a separate genus or subgenus of the genus Apodemus.
- Terricola Fatio, 1867, — is currently recognized as a separate genus or subgenus of the genus Microtus.
- Alexandromys Ognev, 1914, — is currently recognized as a separate genus or subgenus of the genus Microtus.

In the publications by I. Zagorodniuk a number of specifications are proposed regarding the interpretation of ranks and scopes of superfamily groups of mammals and unified names of some other taxa.

- Leporiformes (for Lagomorpha)
- Muriformes (for Rodentia)
- Soriciformes (for Insectivora)
- Lemuriformes (for Primates)
- Vespertilioniformes (for Chiroptera)
- Caniformes (for Carnivora)
- Equiformes (for Perissodactyla)
- Balaeniformes (for Cetacea)
- Cerviformes (for Artiodactyla)

=== Theriological school in Ukraine ===
I. V. Zagorodniuk is the initiator of the establishment and the founder of Theriological school — annual gathering of theriologists taking place in different regions of Ukraine since 1993.

== Scientific publications ==
Scientific interests: fauna and ecology of terrestrial vertebrates of Eastern Europe, biogeography and evolution of cryptic species, species concept and models of speciation, rare species and adventitious biota.

According to the personal profile of Igor Zagorodniuk at Google Academy the h-index of his publications is equal h = 19.

The most cited 10 works of Igor Zagorodniuk by this criterion are:

1. Zagorodnyuk I. V. Karyotypic variability and systematics of the Arvicolini (Rodentia). Communication 1. Species composition and chromosomal numbers. Vestnik zoologii. 1990. Vol. 24. № 2. P. 26–37 (in Russian, with English summary). = 54 cit.
2. Zagorodniuk I. V. Field key to small mammals of Ukraine.. Series: Proceedings of the Theriological School. Vol. 5. Kyiv, 2002. 60 pp (in Ukrainian, with English summary). = 53 cit.
3. Zagorodnyuk I. V., Boyeskorov G. G., Zykov A. E. Variation and taxonomic status of the steppe forms of genus Sylvaemus (falzfeini — fulvipectus — hermonensis — arianus). Vestnik zoologii. 1997. Vol 31, № 5–6. P. 37–56 = 46 cit.
4. Mezhzherin S. V., Zagorodnyuk I. V. A new species of mice of the genus Apodemus (Rodentia, Muridae). Vestnik Zoologii. 1989. № 4. P. 55–59 (in Russian, with English summary). = 45 cit.
5. Zagorodniuk I. V. Steppe fauna core of Eastern Europe: its structure and prospects of protection. Reports Natl. Acad. Sci. Ukr. 1999. № 5. P. 203–210. = 44 cit.
6. Zagorodniuk I. V., Fedorchenko O. O. Allopatric species among rodent group Spermophilus suslicus (Mammalia). Vestnik zoologii. 1995. Vol. 29, № 5-6. — P. 49–58. = 42 cit.
7. Boeskorov G. G., Kartavtseva И. В., Zagorodniuk I. V., Belianin A. N., Liapunova E. A. Nucleolus organizer regions and B-chromosomes of field mice (Mammalia, Rodentia, Apodemus). Genetika. 1995. Т. 31. P. 185-192 = 41 cit (in English).
8. Zagorodnyuk I. V. Karyotypic Variation of 46-chromosome Forms of the Vole Group of Microtus arvalis (Rodentia): a taxonomic evaluation. Vestnik zoologii. 1991. Vol. 25, № 1. P. 36–45 (+ 3rd page of cover). = 40 cit (in Russian, with English summary).
9. Godlevska O., Parnikoza I., Rizun V., Fesenko H., Kutsokon Yu., Zagorodniuk I., Shevchenko M., Inozemtseva D. Fauna of Ukraine: conservation categories. Reference book. The 2nd edition. Kyiv, 2010. 80 p. = 38 cit (In Ukrainian, with English summary).
10. Zagorodniuk I. V. Taxonomic revision and diagnostics of the rodent genus Mus from Eastern Europe. Communication 1. Vestnik Zoologii. 1996. Vol. 30, № 1–2. — P. 28–45 = 44 cit (in Russian, with English summary).
