= Savka House =

Coordinates: 50°37′55″N 30°26′40″E

Savka House is a museum of Ukrainian rural life, located 10 km (6 mi) from Kyiv at Novi Petrivtsi village. The museum features an old Ukrainian house made of clay covered with straw. Highlights of Savka House include numerous ancient household items: tiny glass bottles, ancient shoes with wooden nails which “cost like a cow”, various pots, wooden wheels, a large wooden bowl for making bread. In the yard there is a real smithy, a boots workshop, a pottery, three old bee hives, a kitchen garden and an old well.

The museum's working hours are on weekends, preliminary arrangement is necessary. The excursion program includes Ukrainian traditional performance, tales on Ukrainian customs and Ukrainian dinner.
