= Beekeeping in Ukraine =

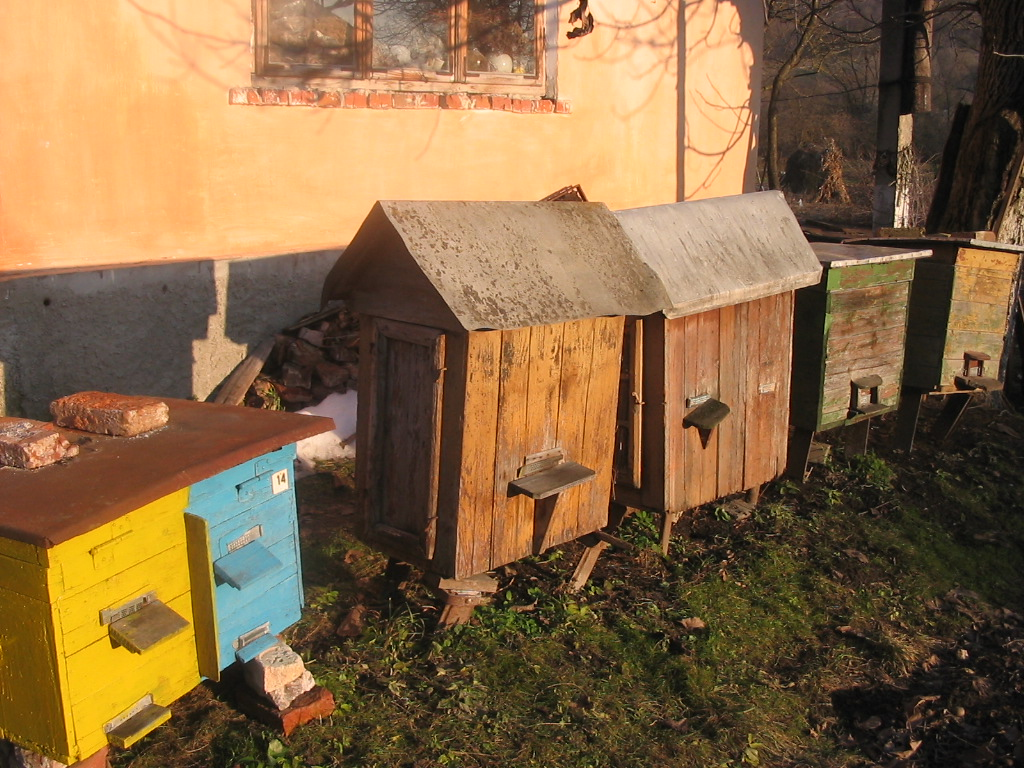
Beehives in Ternopil Oblast, Ukraine

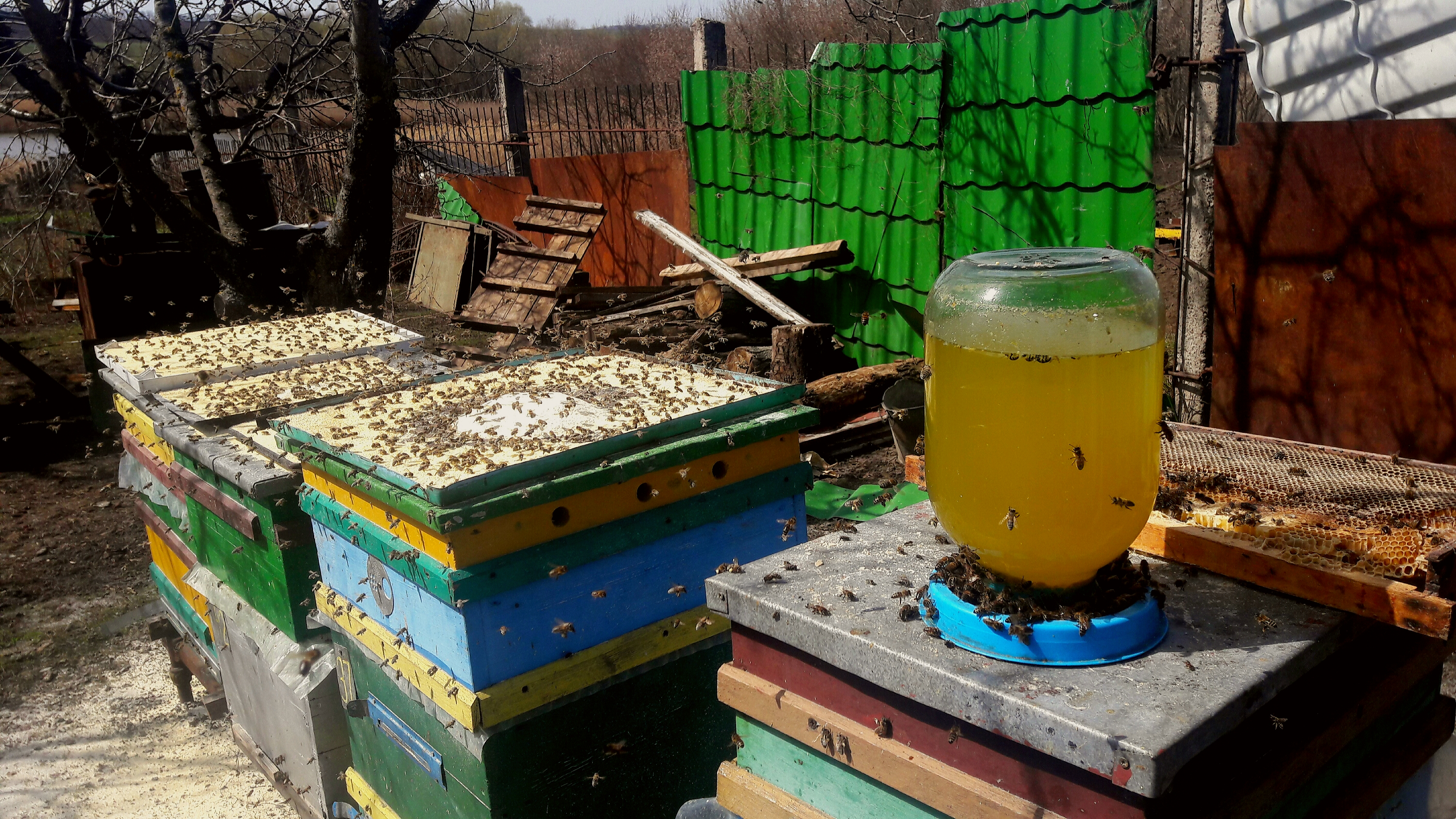
Hives in the spring near Kropyvnytskyi, Ukraine

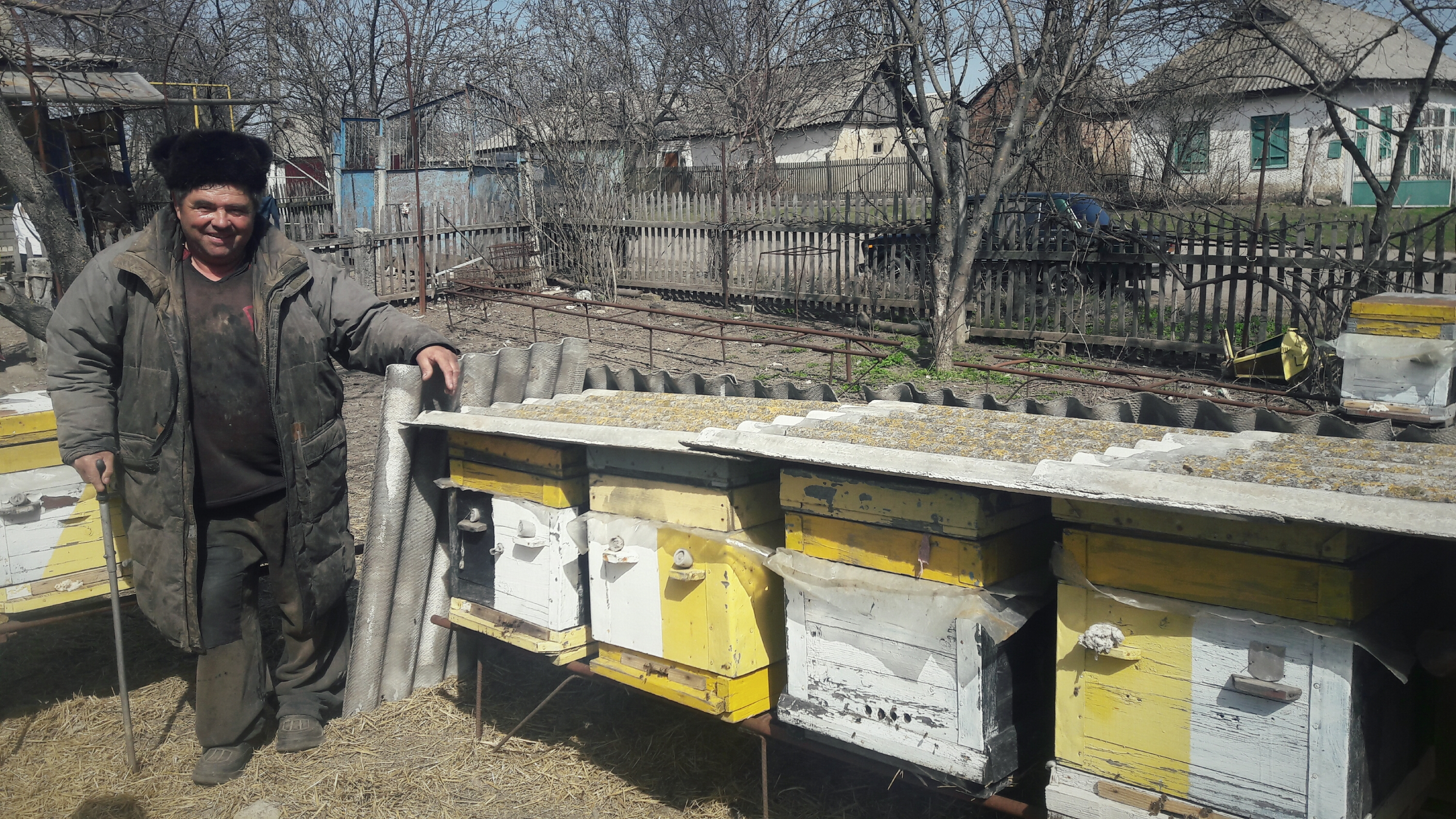
Local beekeeper near Kropyvnytskyi, Ukraine

Beekeeping in Ukraine is a major economic activity. Approximately 700,000 people, 1.5% of the Ukrainian population, are engaged in the production of honey. Ukraine is ranked as the number one country in Europe and among the top five countries in the world for honey production, producing 75 million metric tons (74,000,000 long tons; 83,000,000 short tons) annually. Ukraine produces the greatest quantity of honey per capita in the world.

Ukraine produced 57,919 metric tons (57,004 long tons; 63,845 short tons) of natural honey in 2023, according to the Food and Agriculture Organization (FAO). In 2023, the country exported 55,400 metric tons (54,500 long tons; 61,100 short tons) of honey worth US$121.4 million, of which 45,800 metric tons (45,100 long tons; 50,500 short tons) (US$94.9 million) went to the European Union—about 28% of all EU honey imports—making Ukraine the EU's second-largest honey supplier.

The 2013 World Beekeeping Congress was held in October 2013 in Kyiv, Ukraine.

== History ==
Petro Prokopovych (Ukrainian: Петро Прокопович) (1775–1850) was the founder of commercial beekeeping. He introduced novelties in traditional beekeeping that allowed for great advancement in the field. Among his most important inventions was a hive frame in a separate honey chamber of his beehive. He also invented a crude queen excluder between brood and honey chambers.

According to the Association Agreement with the EU, a quota of duty-free supplies of honey from Ukraine to the EU has been set.

World honey production is 1.5 million tons per year, and Ukraine's share is 5%. According to the FAO, since 2008, Ukraine has been ranked first in honey production among European countries (with a gross harvest of up to 75 thousand tons) and fourth after such world leaders as China (367 thousand tons), Turkey (81.4 thousand tons) and Argentina (81 thousand tons). In total, there are about 700 thousand people engaged in bee breeding and honey production — one and a half percent of the country's population.

In the year to date, as of January 10, Ukraine fills the quota allocated for 2020 of duty-free supplies of honey to the countries of the European Union. In 2020, Ukrainians competently filled the quota as of January 10 (it took only ten days).

As of January 1, 2023, the number of bee colonies in Ukraine amounted to 2.4 million units, which is 10.5% less than the same date a year earlier. This is according to the State Statistics Service of Ukraine (Ukrstat). In particular, there were 32.5 thousand bee colonies in agricultural enterprises (-13.6%), and 2.37 million (-10.5%) in households. The State Statistics Service notes that the data exclude the territories of Ukraine temporarily occupied by the Russian Federation and part of the territories where military operations are ongoing (or have been ongoing). In addition, the level of actual reporting by enterprises is 88%, and the indicators were reassessed. The data can be updated, the State Statistics Service added.

== In culture ==
The Ukraine National Beekeeping Museum located in Kyiv is one of the world's largest beekeeping museums. It contains displays about beekeeping history, hive types, smoker display, art, and other areas of beekeeping. The grounds include a library and laboratory for beekeeping.

The traditional craft of beekeeping in Svatove Raion, Luhansk Oblast has been inscribed in the National Inventory of Elements of the Intangible Cultural Heritage of Ukraine.

Grey Bees, a novel by Andry Kurkov, is about a beekeeper during a conflict with Russia

== See also ==
- Economy of Ukraine
