= Kyiv Water Museum =

Museum in Kyiv

Water-information Centre
- Водно-інформаційний центр
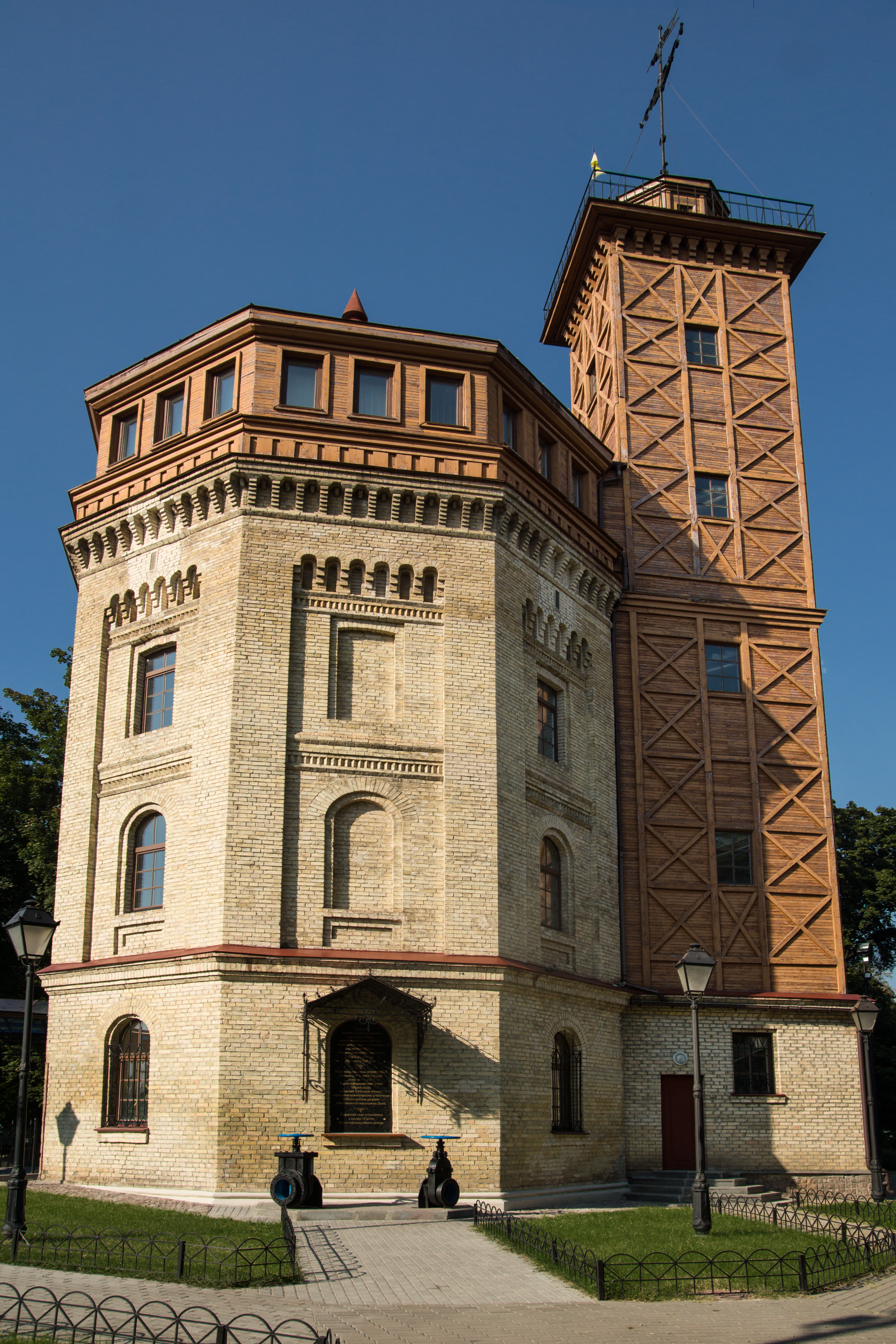
- Established: May 24, 2003
- Location: Hrushevsky Street, 1V, Kyiv, Ukraine
- Coordinates: 50°27′9.5″N 30°31′53.7″E
- Visitors: 100 000 / year
- Architect: Karsten Møller
- Website: www.aqua-kiev.info

Immovable Monument of Local Significance of Ukraine
- Official name: Вежа водогінна з підземним резервуаром (Water tower with an underground reservoir)
- Type: Architecture, Urban Planning, Science and Technology
- Reference no.: 442/6-Кв

The Kyiv Water Museum (official name the Water-Information Centre) is an educational centre that occupies one of the buildings from the early centralised water-supply system in the city, which was built at the middle of the 19th century. It is located in Khreshchatyi Park. The Water-Information Centre gives information about water resources and their rational consumption. The exhibition demonstrates the history of Kyiv's water supply system, water treatment and waste water treatment in contemporary Kyiv, while also showing water's role in people's activities using interesting and interactive examples.

The Water-Information Centre is one of the most attended cultural institutions in Kyiv. In April 2014, the 1.5 millionth visitor got a ceremonial welcome.

== History ==
The Water-Information Centre was established on 24 May 2003 by Kyiv's city government with the support of the Ministry of Environment of Denmark during the Fifth Ministerial Conference, "Environment for Europe".

The entrance of the centre is in a water tower built in 1876, and the administration center is located in a water tower nearby built in 1872. Both water-towers were reconstructed in 2003, in accordance with original plans. The main exhibition is located in an underground water tank built in 1909, and was designed by Karsten Møller, from Denmark.

== Exhibition ==
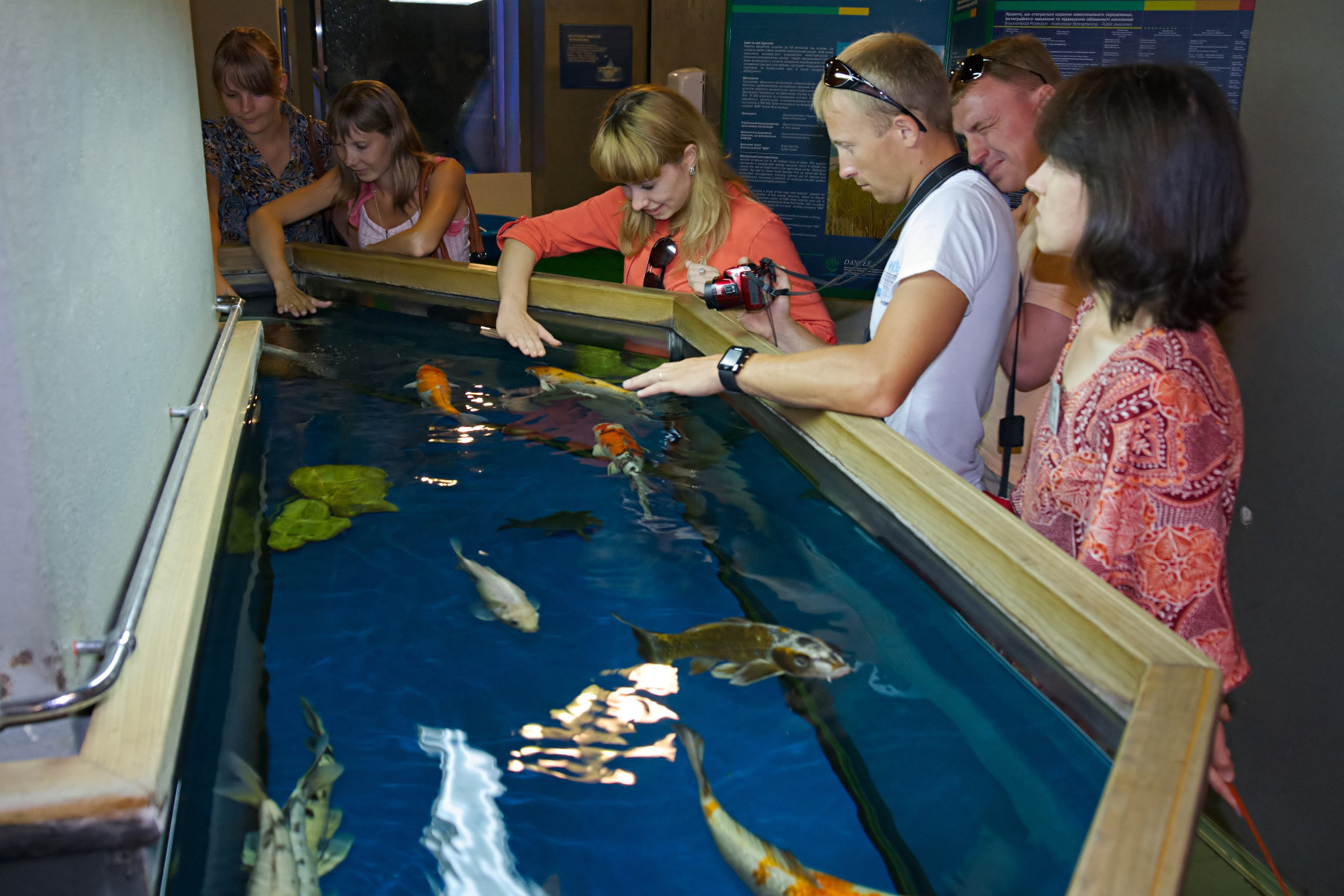
Aquarium with Koi

The exhibition is informative and interactive. There are technical exhibitions, aqua parks and theatres. Visitors can learn about water resources and their value in people's life. The journey through the museum represents a trip through Kyiv's water-supply system, demonstrating both water and wastewater treatment. There is also a playground with a sandbox, a pump and soap bubbles.

A large aquarium with koi represent water's great importance for all forms of life.

== Information for visitors ==
Tours are conducted by guides speaking Ukrainian or Russian. Excursions for foreign tourists are available with a guide speaking English or French on request.
