= One Street Museum =

Coordinates: 50°27′44″N 30°31′03″E

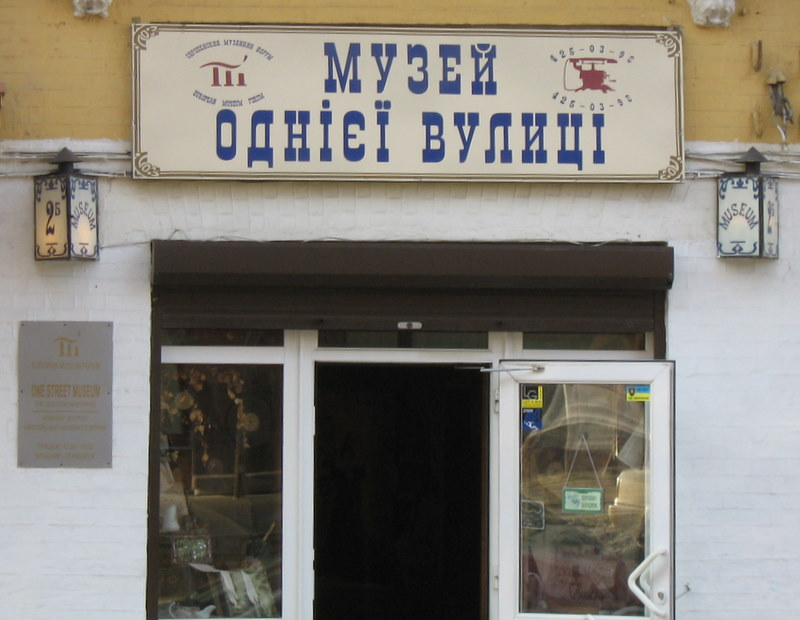
- Established: May 1991
- Location: Andriivskyi Descent, 2-B, Kyiv, Ukraine
- Director: Dmitryi Shlyonsky
- Website: http://onestreet.kiev.ua/about-museum-eng/

Immovable Monument of Local Significance of Ukraine
- Official name: Будинок прибутковий (Profitable house)
- Type: Architecture, Urban Planning
- Reference no.: 283/2-Кв

The One Street Museum is a museum on Andriivskyi Descent, one of the most ancient streets in Kyiv, Ukraine. It houses many of the historic items of Andriivskyi Descent, containing more than 7000 exhibits. They include information about the Saint Andrew's Church, the castle of Richard Lionheart, and the many other buildings of the Descent. The museum hosts historical documents, manuscripts, autographs, antique postcards, photos, and a great number of objects of the antique interior.

Also, the museum has a collection of various works by Ukrainian philologist Pavlo Zhytetsky, Arabist and professor of the Kyiv University Taufik Kezma, journalist and public figure Anatoly Savenko, and Ukrainian writer Hryhir Tiutiunnyk who all lived in the house at number 34 during the twentieth century. Another part of the museum collection is the memorabilia of professors of Kyiv Theological Academy A. Bulgakov, S. Golubev, P. Kudryavtsev, F. Titov, A. Glagolev; doctors Th. Janovsky and D. Popov, and other prominent local figures.

The museum also has a large collection of antique books, including a Trebnik of the Metropolitan of Kyiv Peter Mogila, rare editions of works written by professors and graduates of the Kyiv-Mohyla Academy, books written by M. Grabovsky, the Defender of Orthodoxy, A. Muravyov, and the works of Mikhail Bulgakov published in his lifetime.

In 2002 the One Street Museum became a nominee for European Museum Forum — an international organization under the auspices of the Council of Europe and under the patronage of Queen Fabiola of Belgium. It was the first and only museum of Ukraine participating in the Forum.
