= Kyriak Kostandi =

Russian painter

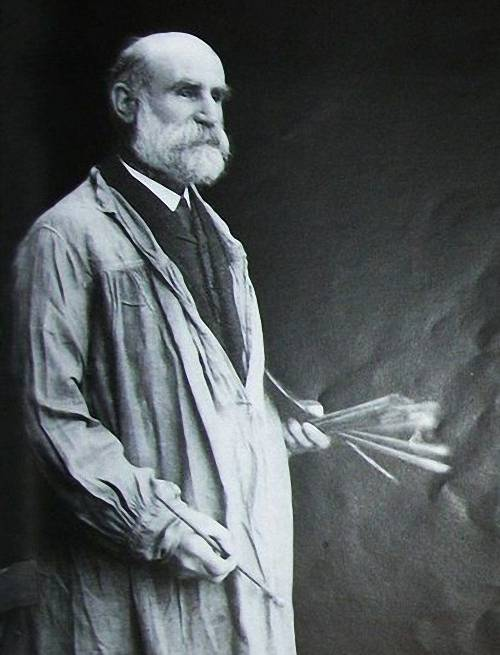
- Born: 3 October 1852; Dofinivka, Kherson Governorate, Russian Empire (now Kherson, Ukraine)
- Died: 31 October 1921 (aged 69); Odesa, Ukrainian SSR
- Education: Member Academy of Arts (1907)
- Alma mater: Imperial Academy of Arts (1882)
- Known for: Painting

Kyriak Kostiantynovych Kostandi (Ukrainian: Киріак Костянтинович Костанді; 3 October [O.S. 21 September] 1852 – 31 October 1921) was a prominent painter and an art scholar from the Russian Empire. A member of the Russian realist artistic movement Peredvizhniki (lit. Itinerants) he also authored several Impressionist paintings.

Most of Kostandi's life and work is connected with the city of Odesa (now in Ukraine) in the southwest of the Russian Empire where he lived most of his life. His paintings are displayed in the museums of Odesa, Kyiv, Moscow and St. Petersburg.

== Life ==
Kostandi was born in 1852 in Dofinovka, close to the city of Odesa, into a family of Greek descent. Kostandi graduated from the Odesa Drawing School in 1874, and then the Saint Petersburg Academy of Arts in 1882. He then returned to Odesa, where he painted and taught at the drawing school. In 1897 he joined the Peredvizhniki. Kostandi played an important part in introducing the ideology of the Peredvizhniki to Ukraine. He was one of the founders of the Society of South Russian Artists, serving as the society's president from 1902 to 1920. In 1907 he was elected a full member of the Saint Petersburg Academy of Arts. From 1917 he served as director of the Odesa City Museum.

Kostandi was a strict realist, and was opposed to every formalist trend. He was mainly a genre painter, but also did some landscape painting and portrait painting. After his death, his followers started the Kostandi Society of Artists .

== Characteristics of art ==
Kostandi is an artist whose canvases are built at the junction of high craftsmanship and an understanding of tragic existence. They are characterized by a wide range of social problems, which cannot but concern him. At the end of the 1880s, a change occurs in Kostandi's work. He remains committed to the genre of life but fundamentally changes the artistic approaches and his view of the essence of painting. At that time, he considers the problems of sunlight and plain air to be the most important ones. In a sense, inheriting the masters of Impressionism, for which the importance of temporal and psychological unity, Kostandi, in his small paintings tries to stop time and moment of feeling. His contemporaries have pointed out that Kostandi was a philosophical artist. From the 1890s all his paintings have the peculiarity of a small plotline, almost minimalism in the image, combined with a high poetic mood. It is the transmission of feelings and moods that becomes the artist's main aim.

== Gallery ==
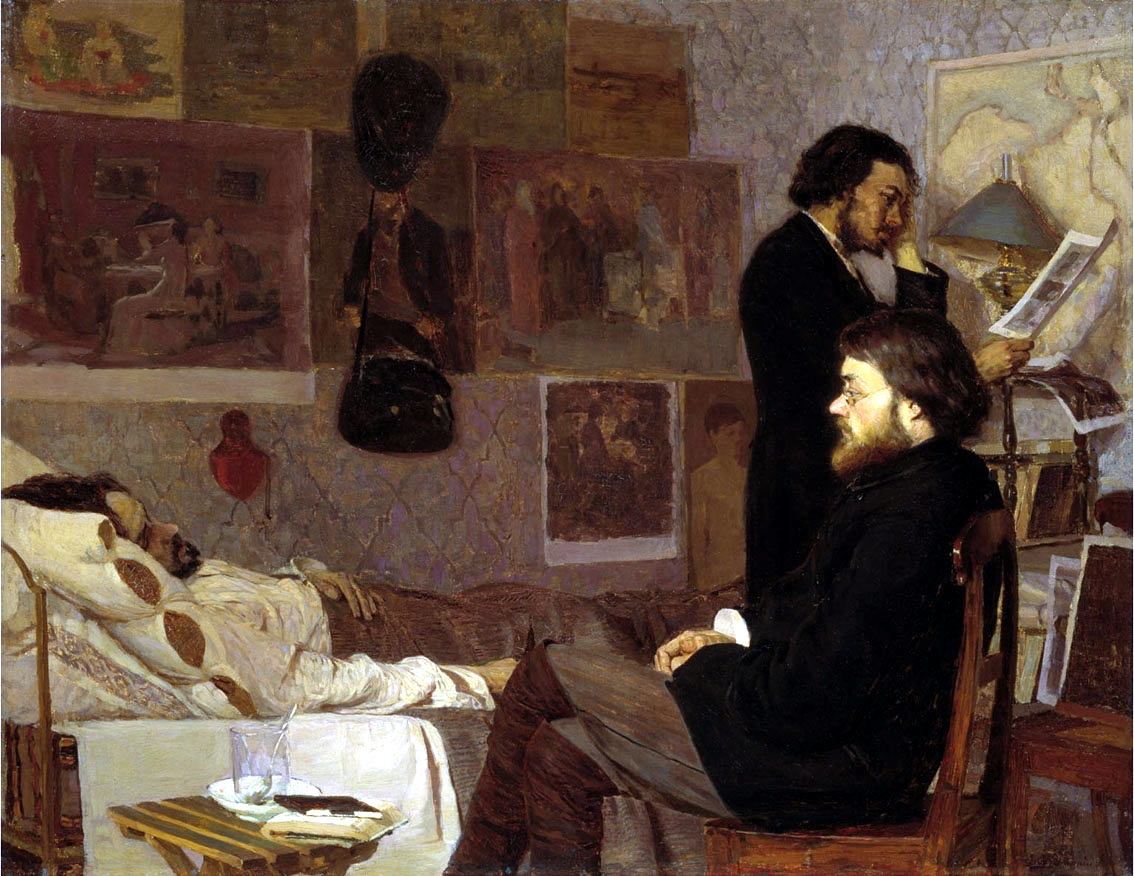
Have a sick friend (1884)

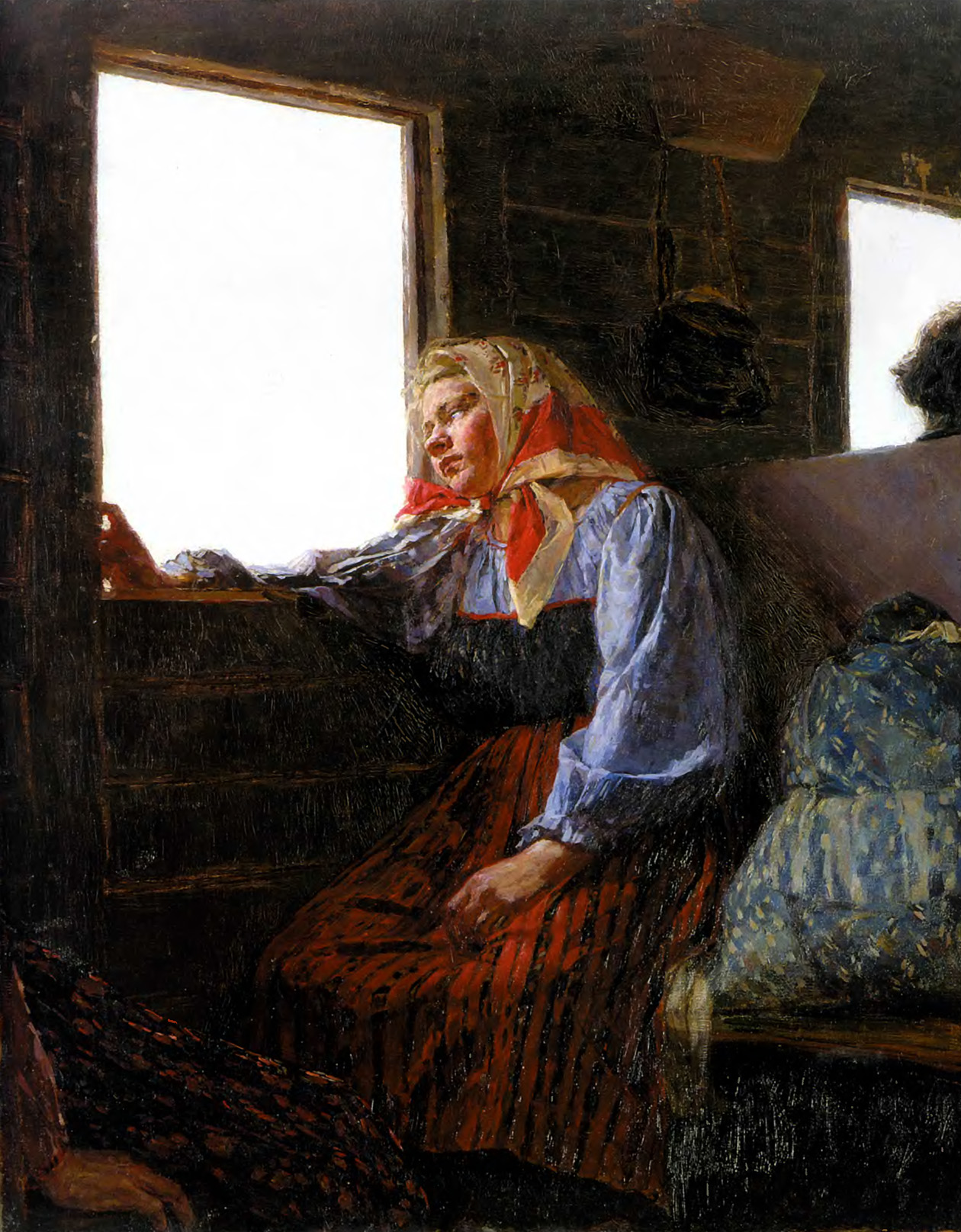
Out Into the World (1885)

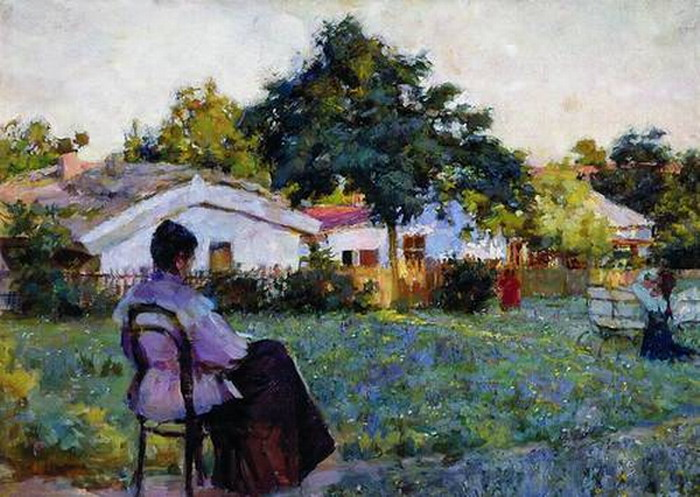
In the country. Noon (1892)

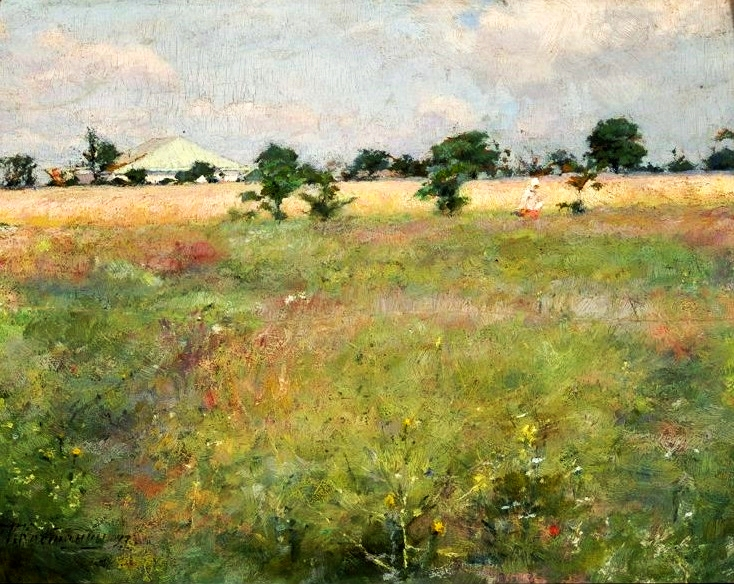
Landscape (1897)

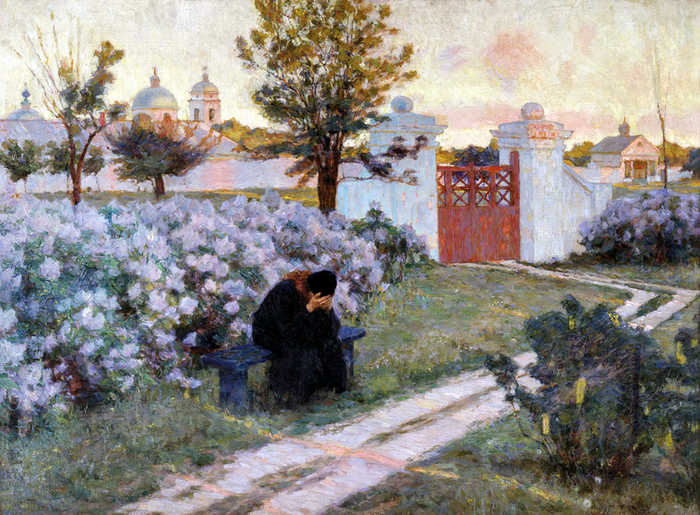
Lilac (1902)

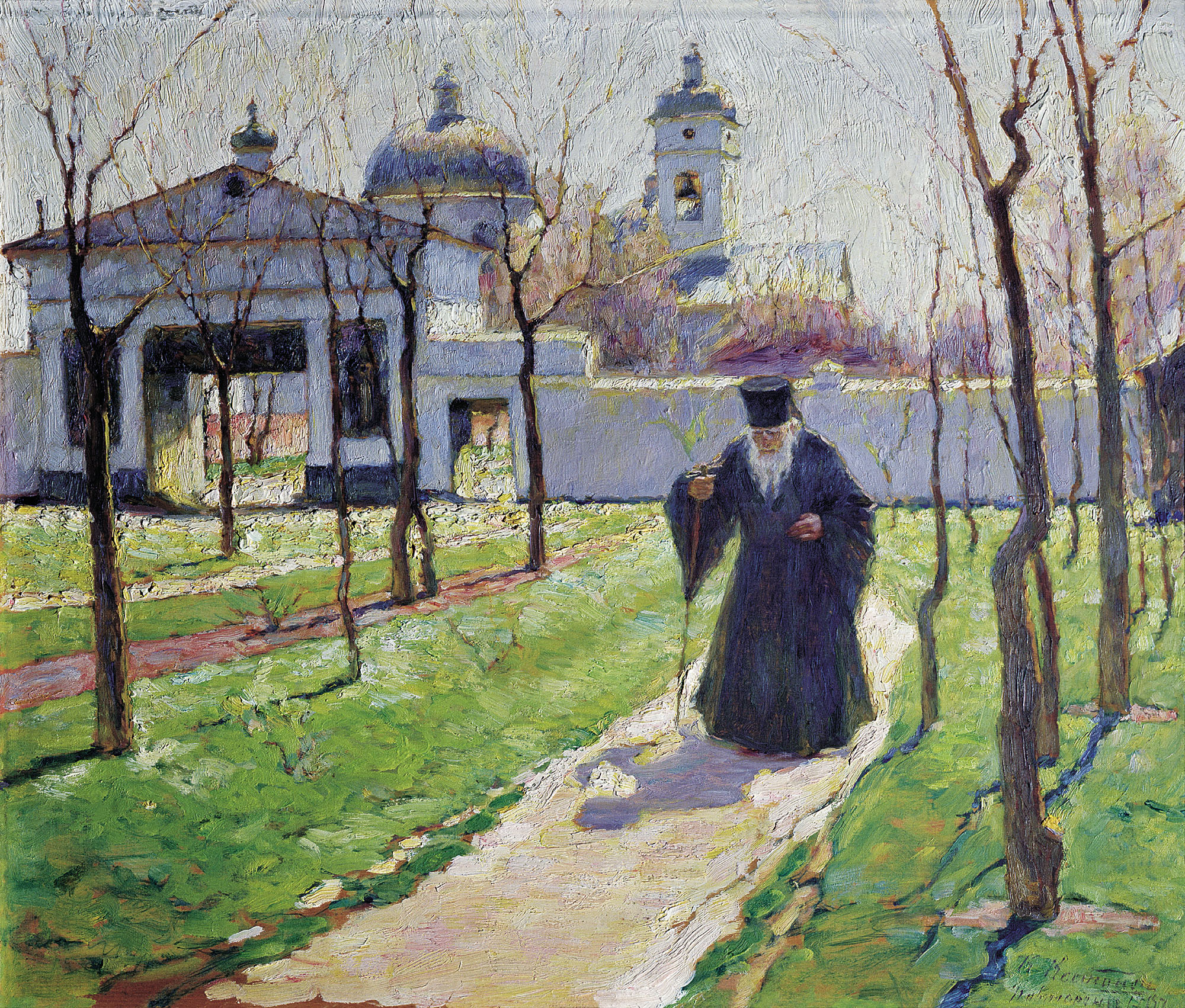
Early spring (1915)

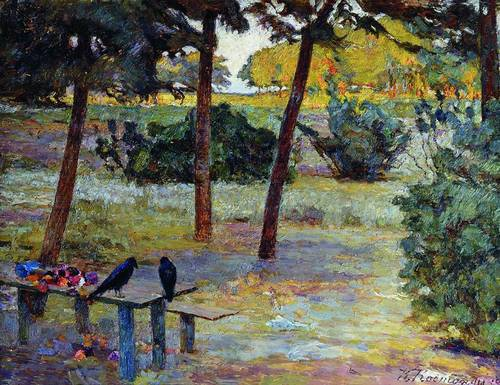
Jackdaw. Autumn (1915)
