= 218th Rifle Division =

218th Motorized Division (February 1941 - September 8, 1941) 218th Rifle Division (September 8, 1941 - September 27, 1942) 218th Rifle Division (June 20, 1943 - July 1945)
- Active: 1941–1945
- Country: Soviet Union
- Branch: Red Army
- Type: Infantry
- Role: Motorized Infantry
- Size: Division
- Engagements: Operation Barbarossa; Battle of Kiev (1941); Battle of the Sea of Azov; Battle of Rostov (1941); Case Blue; Belgorod–Kharkov offensive operation Battle of the Dniepr; Battle of Kiev (1943); Ozarichi-Ptich Offensive; Lvov–Sandomierz offensive Vistula–Oder offensive Lower Silesian offensive Siege of Breslau
- Decorations: Order of Lenin (2nd formation); Order of the Red Banner (2nd formation); Order of Suvorov (2nd formation)
- Battle honours: Romodan (2nd formation); Kiev (2nd formation)

Commanders
- Notable commanders: Maj. Gen. Aleksei Pavlovich Sharagin; Col. Pavel Trofimovich Klyushnikov; Maj. Gen. Sergei Fyodorovich Sklyarov; Col. Nikolai Nikolaevich Mezenev; Col. Vasilii Ilich Baklanov; Col. Pyotr Savelevich Eroshenko

The 218th Rifle Division was formed as an infantry division of the Red Army after a motorized division of that same number was redesignated about 10 weeks after the start of the German invasion of the Soviet Union.

The division retreated through the southern Ukraine during the autumn until it took part in the defense of Rostov-na-Donu and the counteroffensive in December. Following this it remained on the defensive through the winter and spring of 1942 as part of 37th Army until the German summer offensive began. Retreating again in the face of the 1st Panzer Army most of the 218th was encircled near Millerovo in mid-July and although some elements escaped the division was officially disbanded in September.

A new 218th was formed in June 1943 in the Steppe Military District based on the cadres of two rifle brigades that had been involved in the amphibious landings west of Novorossiysk in February. It was assigned to the 47th Army and fought its way through eastern Ukraine in August and September, winning a battle honor on the way. It made three east-to-west crossings of the Dniepr up to early November when it played a role in the liberation of the Ukrainian capital, gaining another battle honor and soon after the Order of the Red Banner. During the subsequent German counteroffensive it was encircled at Zhytomyr and was forced to break out at the cost of heavy losses in men and equipment; although it returned to the fighting in January 1944 it was clearly not fully combat capable and went back to the Reserve of the Supreme High Command shortly after. In April it returned as part of 3rd Guards Army in 1st Ukrainian Front. The 218th served with distinction in the Lvov–Sandomierz operation, forcing a bridgehead over the Vistula in August. Before the winter offensive into Poland and Germany it was transferred to 6th Army and won a further decoration in the Lower Silesian offensive before taking part in the siege of Breslau for the duration of the war. After the German surrender it was awarded the Order of Lenin but nevertheless was disbanded shortly after.

== 218th Motorized Division ==
The division began forming in February 1941, based on the 12th Motorized Rifle Brigade, as part of the prewar buildup of Soviet mechanized forces in the Odessa Military District as part of the 18th Mechanized Corps. Once formed its order of battle was as follows:

- 658th Motorized Rifle Regiment
- 667th Motorized Rifle Regiment
- 135th Tank Regiment
- 663rd Artillery Regiment
- 44th Antitank Battalion
- 231st Antiaircraft Battalion
- 288th Reconnaissance Battalion
- 388th Light Engineering Battalion
- 591st Signal Battalion
- 216th Artillery Park Battalion
- 368th Medical/Sanitation Battalion
- 687th Motor Transport Battalion
- 164th Repair and Restoration Battalion
- 23rd Regulatory Company
- 466th Chemical Defense (Anti-gas) Company
- 747th Field Postal Station
- 597th Field Office of the State Bank

The division continued under the command of Col. Aleksei Pavlovich Sharagin, who had led the 12th Motorized Brigade. At the time of the German invasion the 218th was part of the 9th Army (former Odessa Military District). It was understrength in infantry, the 663rd had only one battalion of 12 122mm howitzers, and the 135th had no tanks at all. However, unlike most of the motorized divisions it had enough trucks to convey most of the infantry it did have, and so quickly became a mobile reserve division for Southern Front. In this role it fought across the southern Ukraine and the Donbass until early September, first under direct command of the Front, and by the beginning of August as part of 18th Army; by the start of September it was back under Front command. On September 8 it was officially redesignated as the 218th Rifle Division after incorporating the 182nd Reserve Rifle Regiment to replace the 135th Tanks.

== 1st Formation ==
Under the circumstances, in full retreat along the north coast of the Sea of Azov after taking heavy casualties in the earlier fighting, the division's order of battle was largely theoretical until it had a chance to thoroughly reorganize but eventually was as follows:

- 372nd Rifle Regiment
- 658th Rifle Regiment
- 667th Rifle Regiment
- 663rd Artillery Regiment
- 44th Antitank Battalion
- 435th Antiaircraft Battery (later 231st Antiaircraft Battalion)
- 288th Reconnaissance Company
- 388th Sapper Battalion
- 591st Signal Battalion
- 368th Medical/Sanitation Battalion
- 85th Chemical Defense (Anti-gas) Company
- 71st Motor Transport Company
- 328th Field Bakery
- 1511th Field Postal Station (later 747th)
- 597th Field Office of the State Bank

Colonel Sharagin remained in command of the division and would be promoted to the rank of major general on March 27, 1942. At the start of October it was back in 9th Army but later that month it moved back to direct Front command.

=== Battle of Rostov ===
The move to the Front reserves allowed the 218th to escape the fate of most of 9th Army in the Chernigovka pocket. The remnants of that Army fell back toward Taganrog, forming a rebuilt defense along the Mius River. On November 21 the 1st Panzer Army captured Rostov but the thrust to reach the city opened a gap between it and 17th Army to the west that was soon exploited by 37th Army. Shortly after the 9th and 56th Armies attacked the southern and eastern flanks of 1st Panzer and by November 29 had cleared the city. By the beginning of December the division had been moved to 12th Army, still in Southern Front, but in January 1942 it was reassigned again, now to 37th Army, where it remained into the spring. In this Army it was south of the Izium salient and therefore escaped the German counteroffensive that devastated the Front's 9th and 57th Armies in May. On May 19 General Sharagin left the division to further his military education; he would go on to lead the 3rd Guards Mechanized Corps before he was killed in action in December 1943. Col. Mikhail Sergeevich Subbotin took over command of the 218th.

=== Case Blue ===
The 1st Panzer and 17th Armies launched their summer offensive against the much-weakened Southern Front on July 7. 37th Army was positioned south of the Donets and north of Artemivsk with four divisions, including the 218th, in the first echelon and one in reserve, supported by just 46 tanks of the 121st Tank Brigade, and was soon falling back north of the river and eastward north of Luhansk in the face of the advance by 1st Panzer. During the retreat it was transferred to the 24th Army. By dawn on July 15 the 3rd Panzer Division of 4th Panzer Army had linked up with 14th Panzer of 1st Panzer Army 40 km south of Millerovo. This appeared to seal the fate of up to five Soviet armies, including the 24th, but the encirclement was never really closed; the cordon was porous at best as the German infantry lagged behind. Some remnants of 24th Army managed to escape eastward over the following days although German sources identified the 218th as one of the Red Army divisions "destroyed" in the pocket. As of July 25 a report of the defensive dispositions of Southern Front stated remnants of the division were back under command of 37th Army, helping to hold a sector 50–115 km east of Rostov, but had no more than 2,000 personnel on strength at this time and by the beginning of August it was no longer part of the Red Army order of battle, although it was not officially disbanded until September 27.

== 2nd Formation ==
A new 218th Rifle Division was formed in the 47th Army on June 20, 1943, based on the 2nd formation of the 51st Rifle Brigade and the 165th Rifle Brigade, in the Steppe Military District of the Reserve of the Supreme High Command and was immediately assigned to the 21st Rifle Corps.

=== 51st Rifle Brigade ===
This brigade was formed for the second time in the west of the Transcaucasus Military District in August 1942 from military schools and training establishments along the coast of the Black Sea. By the end of the month it was assigned to 46th Army of Transcaucasus Front, which was tasked with holding the passes through the High Caucasus from south of Tuapse to Mount Elbrus. It remained there until Army Group A began its retreat toward Rostov and the Taman peninsula in December. In January 1943 it joined the 16th Rifle Corps which was soon assigned to 18th Army and was conveyed to the Malaya Zemlya bridgehead west of Novorossiysk on February 18. Over the following months it was fought down to a remnant which was evacuated in June.

=== 165th Rifle Brigade ===
Similar to the 51st the 165th was formed in September 1942 in the Transcaucasus Military District based on military students and training units and was one of the last units to be officially designated as a Student (Kursantskii) Brigade. In late October it was assigned to 18th Army in the Black Sea Group of Forces in Transcaucasus Front taking part in the defense of Tuapse and the first phase of the pursuit of Army Group A. At the end of the year it was moved to the reserves of the Black Sea Group before also being assigned to 16th Rifle Corps in January 1943. Two of its battalions took part in the amphibious assault alongside the 255th Naval Infantry Brigade at Novorossiysk on February 6 and by the 18th the remainder of the brigade was also ashore in Malaya Zemlya. In May it was reassigned to the 20th Rifle Corps but in June its remnants were evacuated along with those of the 51st.

Battle of Kursk. Note position of 47th Army.

Col. Pavel Trofimovich Klyushnikov was assigned to command on the day the division was formed. Once this was completed its order of battle was very similar to that of the 1st formation:

- 372nd Rifle Regiment
- 658th Rifle Regiment
- 667th Rifle Regiment
- 663rd Artillery Regiment
- 44th Antitank Battalion
- 487th Reconnaissance Company
- 388th Sapper Battalion
- 591st Signal Battalion (later 1454th Signal Company)
- 368th Medical/Sanitation Battalion
- 85th Chemical Defense (Anti-gas) Company
- 513th Motor Transport Company
- 328th Field Bakery
- 83rd Divisional Veterinary Hospital
- 2192nd Field Postal Station (later 747th)
- 525th Field Office of the State Bank

By the beginning of August the 47th Army had been assigned to Voronezh Front in anticipation of the Soviet counteroffensive following the German offensive at Kursk.

=== Belgorod-Kharkov Offensive Operation ===
On August 14 Colonel Klyushnikov handed his command over to Col. Dmitrii Nikiforovich Dolganov. The overall offensive began on August 3 but 47th Army remained in reserve until it was committed on August 17. Following a 50-minute artillery and air bombardment the combined forces of 47th, 38th and 40th Armies broke through the German defense and advanced 10–12 km, reaching a line from Bezdrik to Velikii Istorop. The next day 47th Army advanced another 20 km, after which it was ordered to cut the road from Lebedyn to Okhtyrka to help isolate the group of German forces massed around the latter place. This was accomplished on August 19.

The 47th and part of 40th Army engaged in heavy fighting on August 20 with German forces transferred from Okhtyrka and made a further advance of between 5 and 10 km. This cut the last road to that town from the west. The next day the 47th resumed the offensive with the goal of enveloping the Okhtyrka area from the west and southwest. While the German force there evaded encirclement, over the next three days it was defeated and Okhtyrka was liberated. By the end of August 27 the right-flank armies of Voronezh Front had reached the Psel River and a line to the south as far as Kotelva. From here the Front was to undertake a new offensive to the west toward Hadiach and to the south toward Poltava. On the same day Col. Sergei Fyodorovich Sklyarov took over command from Colonel Dolganov; Sklyarov would be promoted to the rank of major general on October 29.

== Battle of the Dniepr ==
As 47th Army advanced on Poltava the 218th played a leading role in the liberation of the town of Romodan on September 18 and received its name as its first battle honor. Within the town the Soviet forces seized warehouses containing 300,000 German mines and artillery shells. By the end of September 22 the Army reached a line from Chepilki to Ashanovka with the 218th in second echelon, but had lost contact with the German forces covering their crossing of the Dniepr in the Kaniv area.

That night the first soldiers of 3rd Guards Tank Army crossed the river near Bukrin, establishing a bridgehead that would be the focus of considerable fighting over the following weeks. Before dawn on September 29 the 218th reached the east bank of the Dniepr in the Sushki and Khmelna sectors, south of the Bukrun bend. During the morning elements of the division forced a crossing and advanced on the village of Pekari. On October 1, despite heavy losses, powerful German tank and infantry counterattacks pressed the division's forces back to the river. At nightfall Sklyarov turned his division's remaining defenses over to forces of the 73rd Rifle Corps of 52nd Army and regrouped his units on the east bank, moving on October 2 to the Borok region. From 2300 hours of the next day to 0500 on October 4 the division again crossed to the west bank, now north of Kaniv, in order to relieve the beleaguered 30th Rifle Division which was helping to defend the Bukrin bridgehead. From this time until October 28 the 218th widened this bridgehead and captured the villages of Sviniavka and Studenets while repelling numerous counterattacks.

=== Battle of Kiev ===
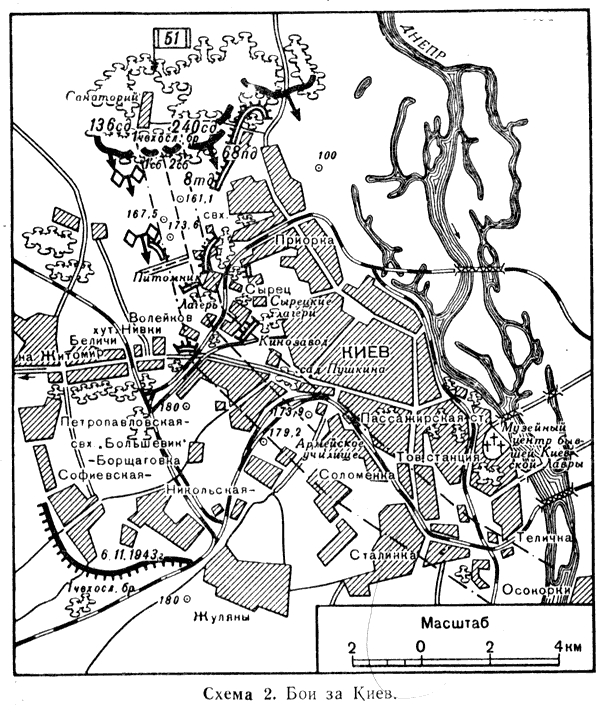
Soviet map of Kiev (1943). Note the Zhytomyr road on left.

By late October it was clear that the Bukrin bridgehead was a strategic dead-end and on October 29 the division handed its sector over to its corps-mate, the 206th Rifle Division, before once more recrossing to the east bank and concentrating in the Lepliaevo region. Over four days it marched north through Voitovtsy and Andreevka to Dymerka before crossing the Desna near Svinredy. During this march it entered the reserves of 1st Ukrainian Front and at 1100 hours on November 2 crossed into the Dniepr bridgehead at Lyutizh, coming under the command of 23rd Rifle Corps of 38th Army. It participated in the surprise offensive from this bridgehead the next day, penetrating the German defenses and over the following two days captured Pushchta-Voditsa and Belichi Station west of Kiev. On November 6 the division made a significant contribution to the liberation of the city by seizing Sviatoshino and cutting the main German communications route, the Kiev-Zhytomyr road. For its important part in this major victory it was awarded its second battle honor:

KIEV... 218th Rifle Division (Major General Sklyarov, Sergei Fyodorovich)... The troops who participated in the liberation of Kiev, by the order of the Supreme High Command of 6 November 1943, and a commendation in Moscow, are given a salute of 24 artillery salvoes from 324 guns.

After the fall of Kiev the division forced a crossing of the Irpen River and captured two tanks, eight long-range guns, and 12 vehicles in a heated battle for the village of Yasnogorod. On November 12 it occupied Levkovo, pushed across the Teteriv and reached the approaches to Zhytomyr; during the day it defeated several counterattacks and accounted for two more tanks, three other armored vehicles, and more than 100 German personnel. General Sklyarov was killed at Levkovo when his headquarters was struck by a German air attack, and so did not learn that his division was decorated with the Order of the Red Banner the following day. He was replaced in command by Col. Nikolai Nikolaevich Mezenev.

=== Battles for Zhytomyr ===
Zhytomyr was liberated by 38th Army on November 12; by now a gap 100 km wide separated Army Group South from Army Group Center but reconnaissance was showing preparations for a German counteroffensive. Overnight on November 12/13 the STAVKA ordered the 38th, 40th and 3rd Guards Tank Armies to take up defensive positions along the front Zhytomyr–Fastiv–Trypillia. 38th Army's 21st and 23rd Corps took up a line from Kamenka and the Huiva River as far as Volitsa station. The German advance on November 13, led by half of 1st SS Panzer Division Leibstandarte SS Adolf Hitler and elements of the arriving 1st Panzer Division, first struck at Fastiv but then shifted to the west against 21st Corps; its 71st and 135th Rifle Divisions had been shaky in the previous day's fighting and had lost the town of Kornin. In the latter half of the day the German force managed to break through the Corps' front and advance toward Brusyliv. The next day, as the 71st Division lost more ground, the German command was strengthening its infantry forces facing Zhytomyr. On November 15 the 23rd Corps regrouped for the purpose of occupying the line Albinovka–Grada; the 218th was to defend along a front from outside Albinovka and then along the north bank of the Huiva River as far as Peski. Overnight on November 15/16 it was forced to abandon that place and pull back its left flank to the north bank of the Teteriv.

Throughout this fighting, due to poor organization in the rear, the divisions of both 23rd and 21st Corps were short of ammunition and fuel for their vehicles. On November 16 the two panzer divisions again attempted to break through to Brusyliv but made only minor progress in head-on attacks so shifted to the sector of 211th Rifle Division of 17th Guards Rifle Corps in the afternoon. Responsibility for the defense of Zhytomyr was given to 60th Army the same day. During that day's fighting the German forces achieved a significant success east of Zhytomyr. The 7th Panzer Division, with the 20th Panzergrenadiers, forced the Teteriv. At the same time the 88th Infantry Division also forced the river and, after pushing back elements of the 218th, reached the southern outskirts of the city and the Kiev road was close to being cut. By the end of the day 23rd Corps was fighting along a line from the south outskirts of Zhytomyr to Sloboda Selets to Vatskov to Hrada and had been subordinated to 60th Army. Its commander, Lt. Gen. I. D. Chernyakhovskii, issued a categorical order: "Defend the city of Zhytomyr to the last man!"

Throughout November 17 the situation in the Zhytomyr area continued to worsen. 1st SS Panzer cut the Kiev-Zhytomyr road and then turned east, followed by 7th Panzer and 20th Panzergrenadiers although the city continued to hold out. On November 18 a concentric attack that included the 8th Panzer Division from the north succeeded in encircling the Zhytomyr grouping, including most of the 218th, while the remainder of 23rd Corps was forced back north of the road. Overnight on November 18/19 the Front commander, Army Gen. N. F. Vatutin, made the decision that the encircled forces had to break out. During the next day a large part of the forces managed to escape and reached the Vysoko-Cheshkoye–Zabrodye area but suffered significant casualties and the loss of much equipment in the process. On November 30 the 218th was moved to the Reserve of the Supreme High Command for rebuilding; it would remain there until December 13.

=== Ozarichi-Ptich Offensive ===
In the process of being brought up to something close to full strength the division incorporated replacements that were roughly 50 percent Russian and 50 percent Turkmens or of other Central Asian nationalities although there are no indications that it had any "National" or ethnic identity. When it returned to the fighting it was assigned to the 121st Rifle Corps in the reserves of Belorussian Front.

The Front commander, Army Gen. K. K. Rokossovskii, began an offensive on January 16, 1944, with his 61st and 65th Armies in the direction of the town of Ozarichi and the Ptich River. 65th Army's plan was to penetrate the German line along the Ipa River at the junction between 4th Panzer Division and the weak 707th Security Division. The penetration would be made overnight on January 15/16, led by advance detachments of ski troops from 19th Rifle Corps. The fast-moving and silent skiers got into the German rear and spread alarm, scattering the right wing of the security troops. 60th and 354th Rifle Divisions moved into the penetration and pushed westward 3–5 km towards Ozarichi, where the headquarters of XXXXI Panzer Corps was located; it was forced to displace to Parichi. By the end of the 19th these divisions were just 2 km from the eastern defenses of the town; two days later, in heavy fighting, the 354th and 253rd Divisions fought their way into Ozarichi, but were unable to drive the 35th Infantry Division from its western outskirts. At this point the 218th was brought in from reserve but it made little difference as the combined force was only able to gain another 1,000m north of the town, and that largely due to an advance by 48th Army farther to the north. By the end of the month the offensive had ground to a halt. Colonel Mezenev left the division on January 30 and was replaced the next day by Col. Vasilii Ilich Baklanov, who had previously served as deputy commander of the 37th Guards Rifle Division.

== Into Western Ukraine and Poland ==
At the start of February the 218th was in the 27th Rifle Corps of 65th Army but on February 26 it returned to the Reserve of the Supreme High Command where it rejoined 21st Corps, now in the 3rd Guards Army, but in March was reassigned to the 120th Rifle Corps. On April 18 it left the Reserve when 3rd Guards was moved to 1st Ukrainian Front.

=== Lvov–Sandomierz Offensive ===
In preparation for the summer offensive into Poland the 3rd Guards Army was positioned on the right (north) flank of 1st Ukrainian Front and 120th Corps was on the Army's right flank, facing positions of the XXXXII Army Corps west of Lutsk. 120th Corps had its 197th and 218th Divisions in first echelon with the 273rd Rifle Division in reserve. Colonel Baklanov planned a preliminary operation for the night of July 7/8 against heavily fortified German positions in the area of Torchyn. Elements of the division seized the dominating height of Hill 242.2, forcing a German retreat from the village, breaching their first defensive line.

By July 10 the Front command had received information about possible German withdrawals from several vulnerable sectors prior to the main offensive. In response all first echelon divisions were to form reconnaissance detachments of reinforced rifle companies to begin combat operations at 2200 hours on July 12, continuing until 0100 hours on the 13th. The reconnaissance confirmed that the main German forces facing 3rd Guards and the right flank of 13th Army were pulling back under cover of rearguards. At 0300 the Army's forward battalions went over to the attack and during the day the 120th Corps advanced as much as 15 km in an energetic pursuit supported by armor and air attacks. The assault continued at 0515 hours on July 14 following a 30-minute artillery preparation. The next day at 0800 hours the Army began to penetrate the second German defensive belt; 120th Corps was now encountering much stiffer resistance and had to beat off several counterattacks as it slowly moved forward. This line, anchored on the Luha River, was eventually forced and by the end of July 18 the Corps reached the city of Volodymyr-Volynskyi. The next day the 273rd Division was committed from reserve and the city was taken with the help of the 218th; on July 20 the 372nd Rifle Regiment (Colonel Krasovskii, Nikolai Viktorovich) was awarded its name as a battle honor.

120th Corps reached the Polish border by the end of July 23 and captured Hrubieszów the following day as it pursued the defeated German forces toward the Vistula. On August 1 the forward detachments of the 218th reached the river south of Janiszów. Colonel Baklanov led a crossing overnight on August 2/3, landing on an island between the main channel and an old channel to the west and establishing a bridgehead. After building up his forces he directed the division in clearing the island through the night of August 6/7. In the process the dominant Hill 202.7 was taken but Baklanov was seriously wounded, resulting in a broken arm. He refused to evacuate until the height was secured, after which he swam to the east bank of the Vistula with the aid of a medical orderly. On September 13 Baklanov was promoted to the rank of major general and on the 23rd would be made a Hero of the Soviet Union for his leadership and courage. After leaving hospital in February 1945 he was sent to study at the Voroshilov Academy, graduating in 1946; he would go on to command the 48th Guards Rifle Division before his retirement in 1948. He was replaced in command of the division by Col. Dmitrii Pavlovich Sinkin, but this officer would in turn be replaced on August 23 by Col. Pyotr Savelevich Eroshenko, who would lead it for the duration of the war.

== Vistula-Oder Offensive ==
By the start of September the 218th had been reassigned to 22nd Rifle Corps, but later that month was moved to 76th Rifle Corps, still in 3rd Guards Army, before being shifted back to 22nd Corps in October, where it remained into December. In the buildup to the winter offensive the Corps, now consisting of the 218th and 273rd Divisions, was reassigned to 6th Army, commanded by Lt. Gen. V. A. Gluzdovskii, in the same Front, The division would remain in this Army for the duration.

The plan for the Front's participation in the Vistula-Oder offensive, which began on January 12, 1945, called for 6th Army to maintain:

... a static defense, particularly along the sector of the Sandomierz bridgehead. The army is to subsequently be ready to pursue and destroy, together with the 3rd Guards Army, the enemy's Opatów - Ostrowiec group of forces.

A combined force of the Front captured Kielce on January 15, after which the 6th Army was released to regroup its forces to its left as the German forces on its sector began to withdraw. It began its attack at 1600 hours, broke through and began its pursuit in tandem with 3rd Guards. The attacks of the two armies quickly cut the communications of the Opatów–Ostrowiec grouping. Over the next three days it was surrounded and as 3rd Guards turned west the 6th remained to mop up the pocket before being pulled back to the Front's reserve.

=== Lower Silesian Offensive ===
At the start of February the 218th was still in 22nd Corps, now with the 309th Rifle Division. 6th Army was still in reserve and located in the Szczerców–Częstochowa–Krzepice area. For the Lower Silesian operation the Front created a powerful shock group on its right wing consisting of the 3rd Guards, 13th, 52nd and 6th combined-arms armies plus the 4th and 3rd Guards Tank Armies. 6th Army was assigned a 20 km-wide sector within the bridgehead over the Oder River held by 52nd Army in the Małcz area and, backed by 7th Guards Mechanized Corps, was to attack in the direction of Alt Bechern, Koischwitz and into the rear of the German forces defending Breslau, which was expected to be taken by 6th Army on the fourth day, after which it would again return to the Front reserve.

=== Siege of Breslau ===
6th Army had left its concentration area on January 30 and by February 2 was assembled in the woods north of Obergnik, having covered up to 160 km in four days. It then moved into an area southwest of Wolau, relieving part of 52nd Army. 3rd Guards Tank Army was concentrated in the same area by the morning of February 5. 22nd Corps was to break through the German defense along a 1.5 km sector with one division in first echelon. The breakthrough was to be exploited by the 74th Rifle Corps.

The offensive began at 0930 hours on February 8, following a 50-minute artillery preparation. 6th Army captured the village of Parchwitz, advanced 18 km to the southwest, and began fighting along the eastern and southeastern outskirts of Liegnitz with part of 22nd Corps' forces. The following day the Front's breakthrough front expanded to 70 km in width and the combined-arms armies had gained as much as 25 km, although this was less than planned largely due to poor roads. 6th Army was attempting to link up with the Front's left-wing 5th Guards and 21st Armies which had begun their attack three days early. With 22nd Corps tied down at Liegnitz a 15 km-wide gap developed between it and 74th Corps, forcing General Gluzdovskii to commit his reserve 273rd Rifle Division. By now the German command was hurriedly transferring forces to the defense of Breslau, including the 8th and 19th Panzer Divisions.

By the end of February 11 the Army had penetrated the German defenses to a depth of up to 40 km but its offensive front was 100 km long, which was excessive for five rifle divisions and one fortified region. The 218th, still tied down in the Liegnitz area, was relieved by units of 52nd Army and took part in a regrouping on February 12 and overnight on the 12th/13th which concentrated it, along with all the reinforcements attached to 22nd Corps, in the Kanth area from where the Corps was to launch the main attack on Breslau. This began on the morning of February 13 on a front from Kanth to Gross Golau to the east and southeast, aiming to link up with 5th Guards Army. In a day of intermittent intense fighting it reached a line from Domslau to Zweibrodt to Smolz. 74th Corps advanced its right flank as far as Kriptau. The next day 22nd Corps continued to throw the German forces back into the outskirts of Breslau and joined hands with 5th Guards, completing the encirclement. On April 5 the 218th would be awarded the Order of Suvorov, 2nd Degree, for its part in the operations south of the Oder and the encirclement of Breslau.

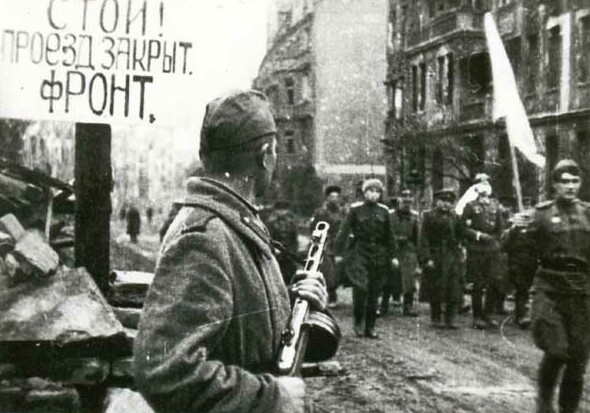
Delegation of German officers walking to negotiations for capitulation of Festung Breslau, May 6, 1945

From past experience at Stalingrad and Budapest it was clear that the pocketed force could not be quickly reduced unless it was immediately broken up into parts, and 1st Ukrainian lacked the forces to do so against a backwater objective. Therefore, the Front commander, Marshal I. S. Konev, decided to leave the 6th Army to besiege Breslau as the remainder of his forces moved westward to form an outer cordon against relief attempts while also advancing toward Berlin. By February 24 the Army had relieved all other Red Army formations in the area. The weakness of Gluzdovskii's forces made it extremely difficult to wage the siege. The encircled grouping proved to be more substantial than had been supposed earlier, as many as 40,000 officers and men as opposed to half that number estimated by Soviet intelligence. The struggle became a protracted one and only concluded on May 6 when the garrison surrendered unconditionally. In April the 218th was reassigned to 74th Corps and it ended the war under that command.

== Postwar ==
The division ended the war with the full title of 218th Rifle, Kiev-Romodan, Order of the Red Banner, Order of Suvorov Division. (Russian: 218-я стрелковая Киевско-Ромодановская Краснознамённая ордена Суворова дивизия.) On June 4, in further recognition of its successful service in the final reduction of Breslau the division was awarded the Order of Lenin, a rare distinction for an ordinary rifle division. According to STAVKA Order No. 11096 of May 29, 1945, part 8, the 218th is listed as one of the rifle divisions to be "disbanded in place". In accordance with the directive it was disbanded between July 10–15, 1945.
