= Andrushivka =

City in Zhytomyr Oblast, Ukraine

Andrushivka Андрушівка
- City
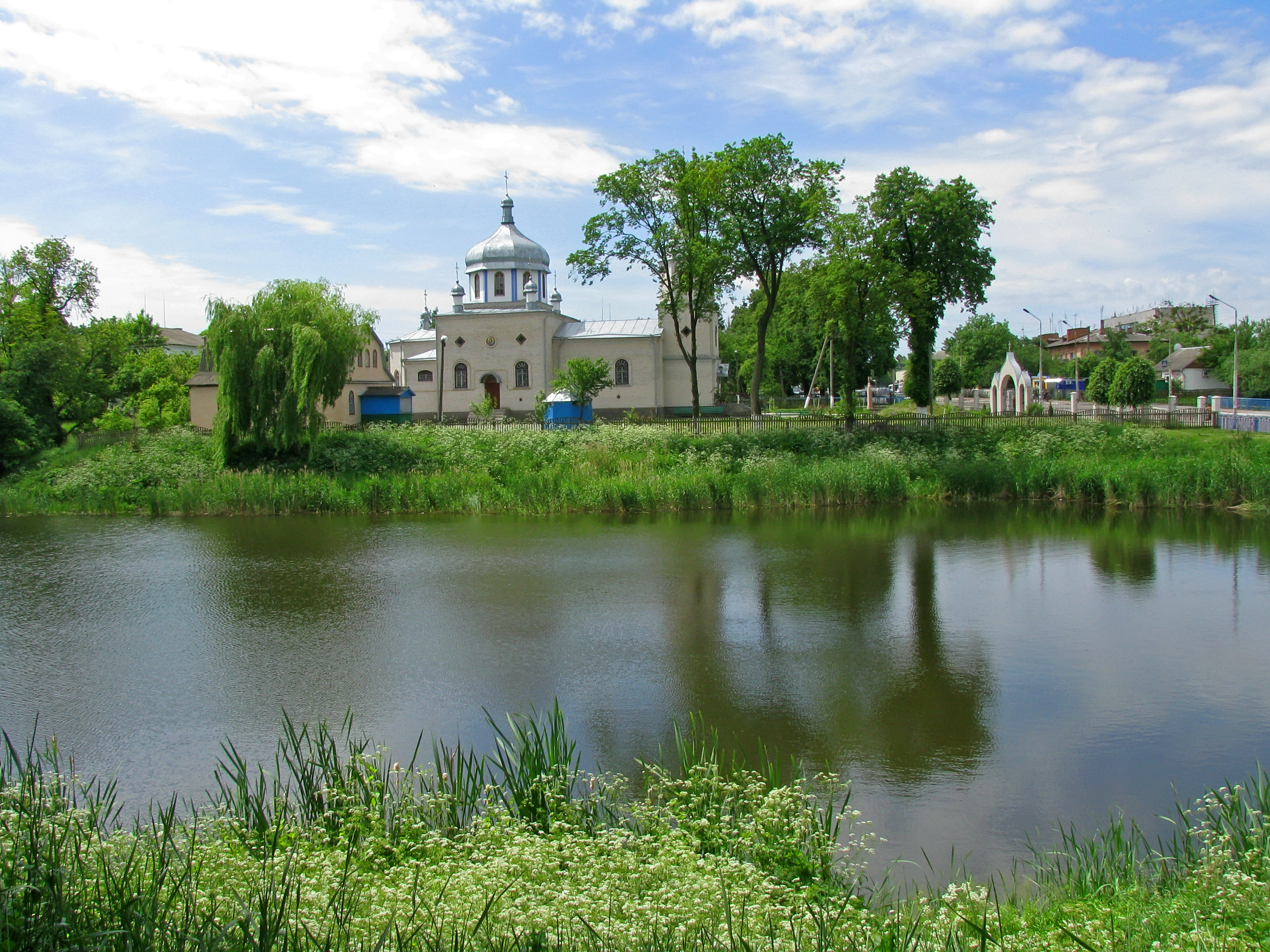
- Skyline of Andrushivka from the city park

- Flag Coat of arms

- Location in Ukraine Andrushivka (Ukraine)
- Coordinates: 50°1′N 29°1′E
- Country: Ukraine
- Oblast: Zhytomyr Oblast
- Raion: Berdychiv Raion
- Hromada: Andrushivka urban hromada

Area
  - Total: 68.08 km^{2} (26.29 sq mi)

Population (2022)
  - Total: 8,325
- Time zone: UTC+2 (EET)
  - Summer (DST): UTC+3 (EEST)

Andrushivka (Ukrainian: Андрушівка, IPA: [ɐndrʊˈʃiu̯kɐ]; Polish: Andruszówka) is a city in Berdychiv Raion, Zhytomyr Oblast, Ukraine. Prior to the 2020 administrative reform, it was the administrative center of the former Andrushivka Raion. The population in 2023 is 8669 people.

The city is located in the south-east of the oblast, on the banks of the Huyva River, a distance of 47 km from the regional capital of Zhytomyr. Andrushivka received city status in 1975. The town hosts Andrushivka Astronomical Observatory (A50). It is connected by railway, served by Andrushivka railway station.

== History ==
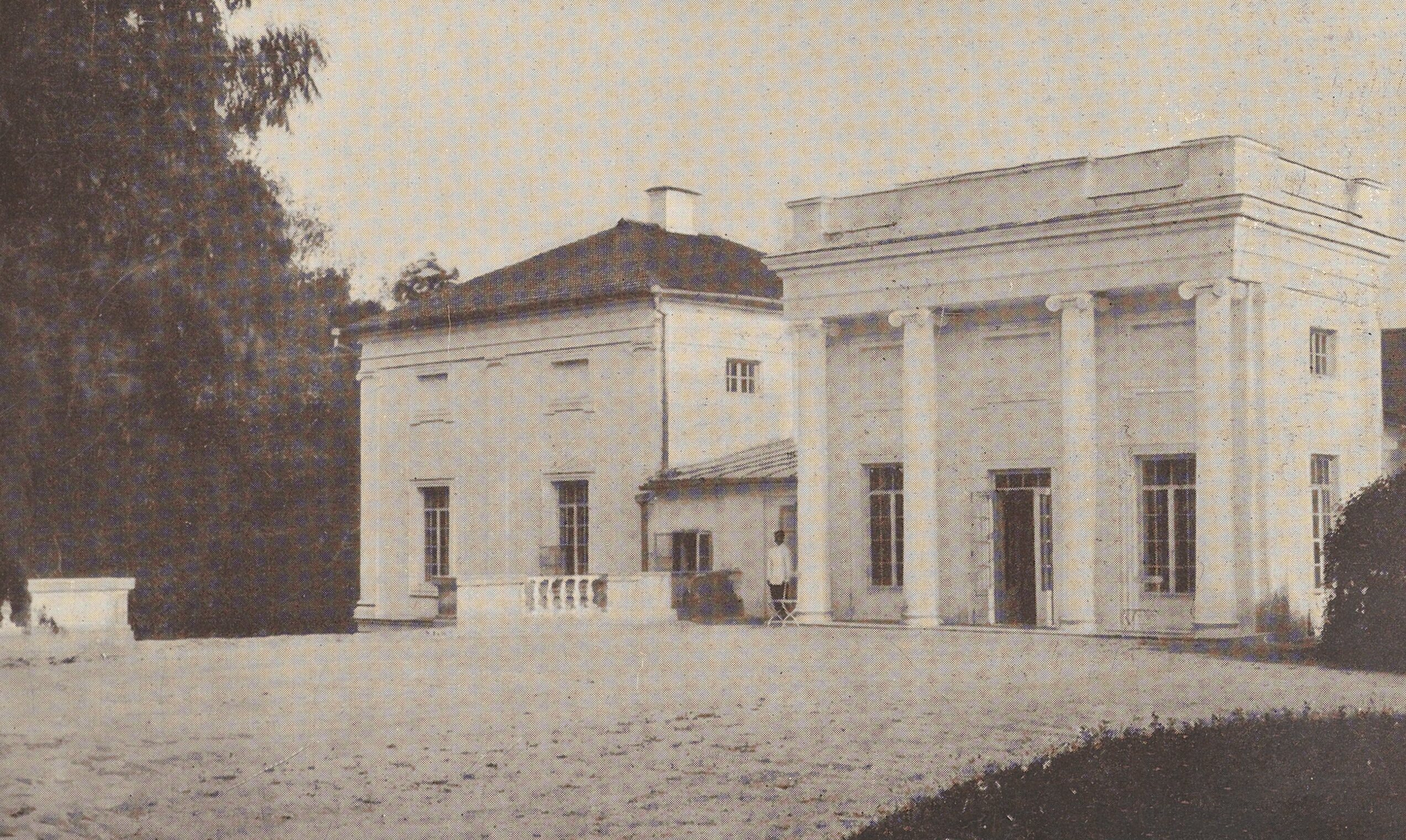
Manor house before 1911

The territory of modern Andrushivka was settled as early as the 1st millennium BC. Implements of the Bronze Age have been unearthed in nearby settlements as well as the remains of the Cherniakhiv culture.

In historical sources, Andrushivka was first mentioned as Andrusovky in 1683. In the seventeenth century the village became the property of the Polish magnates Burzynski, which exploited the local population to work hard. Burzynski built the Burzynski Palace in Andrushivka. The Jews first arrived in Andrushivka in 1784. In 1793, after the second division of the Commonwealth, Andrusivka was annexed by the Russian Empire.

=== 19th century ===
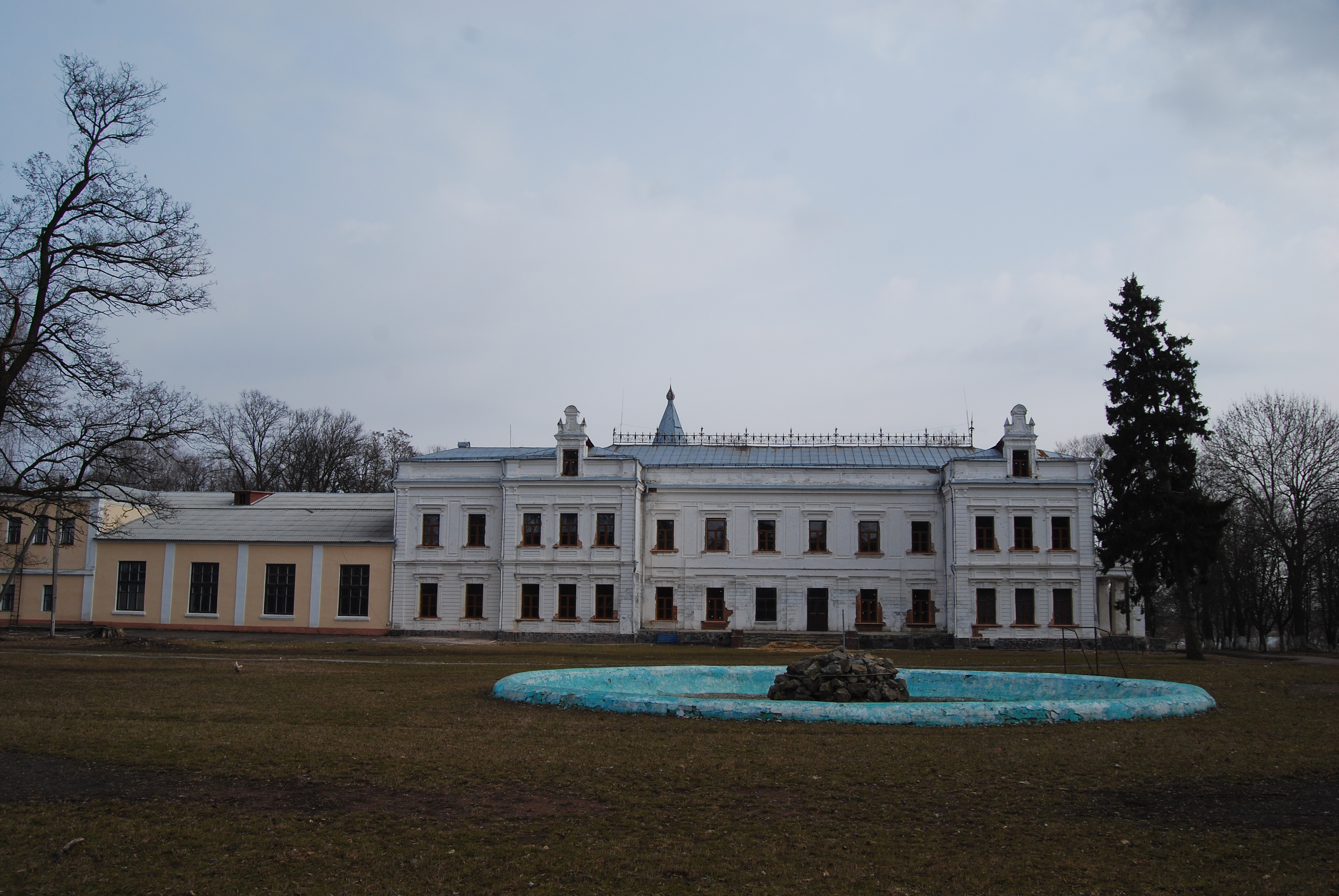
Tereschenko Palace

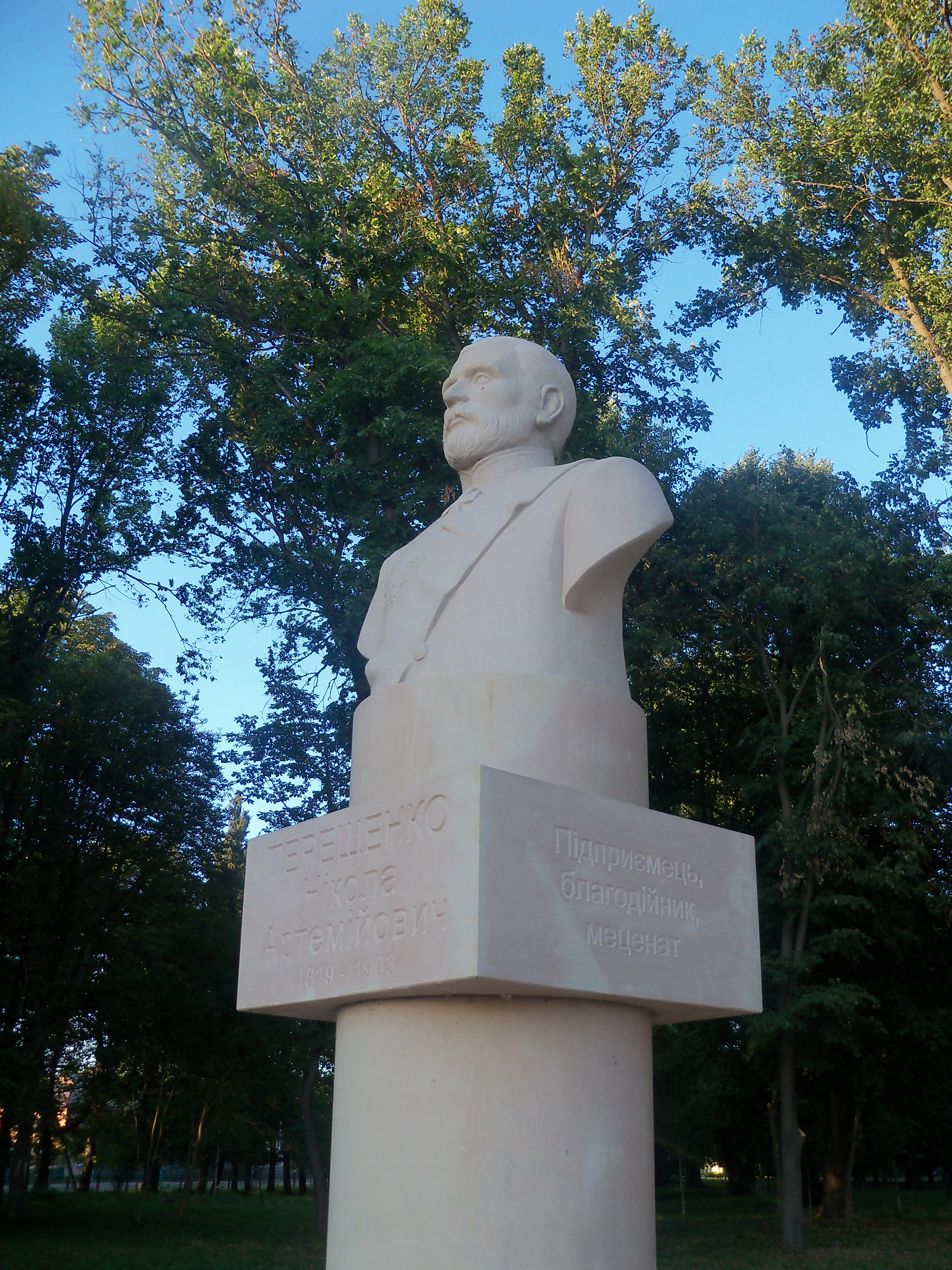
Bust of Mykola Tereshchenko in Andrushivka

Andrushivka gradually increased in size and population. By 1798 it has population of 1046 people, a working distillery with two boilers, three water mills, one on horse-drawn. By the mid nineteenth century, Andrushevka had a tannery, distillery and bi-weekly fairs. Agricultural practice, however, was the chief source of income and soil and climatic conditions were favorable for growing sugar beet, and with the availability of large reserves of land it fueled the rapid development of sugar industry in Andrushivka Raion. Initially there was one small plantation on the left bank of the Huyvy, known as Yatsyukoviy. Laborers came from the surrounding villages and beet was extracted by primitive methods, using horses and oxen. The growth of the population let to a demand for tertiary employment, builders and other jobs which were often carried out seasonally, and the hiring peasants from surrounding villages rose steadily after the abolition of serfdom in 1861.

In 1859 Andrushivka was promoted to the category of town. Testament to the prosperity of the local sugar industry, in 1848 the first sugar factory was built in Zhitomir. Sugar manufacturers Tereshchenko then built the Andrushivka Sugar Factory in Andrushivka in 1869 and opened an estate there; Artemiy Tereshchenko also built a brick palace complex Tereschenko Palace in the French Neo-renaissance style and in 1871 opened the Dvoklasne school.

=== 20th century ===
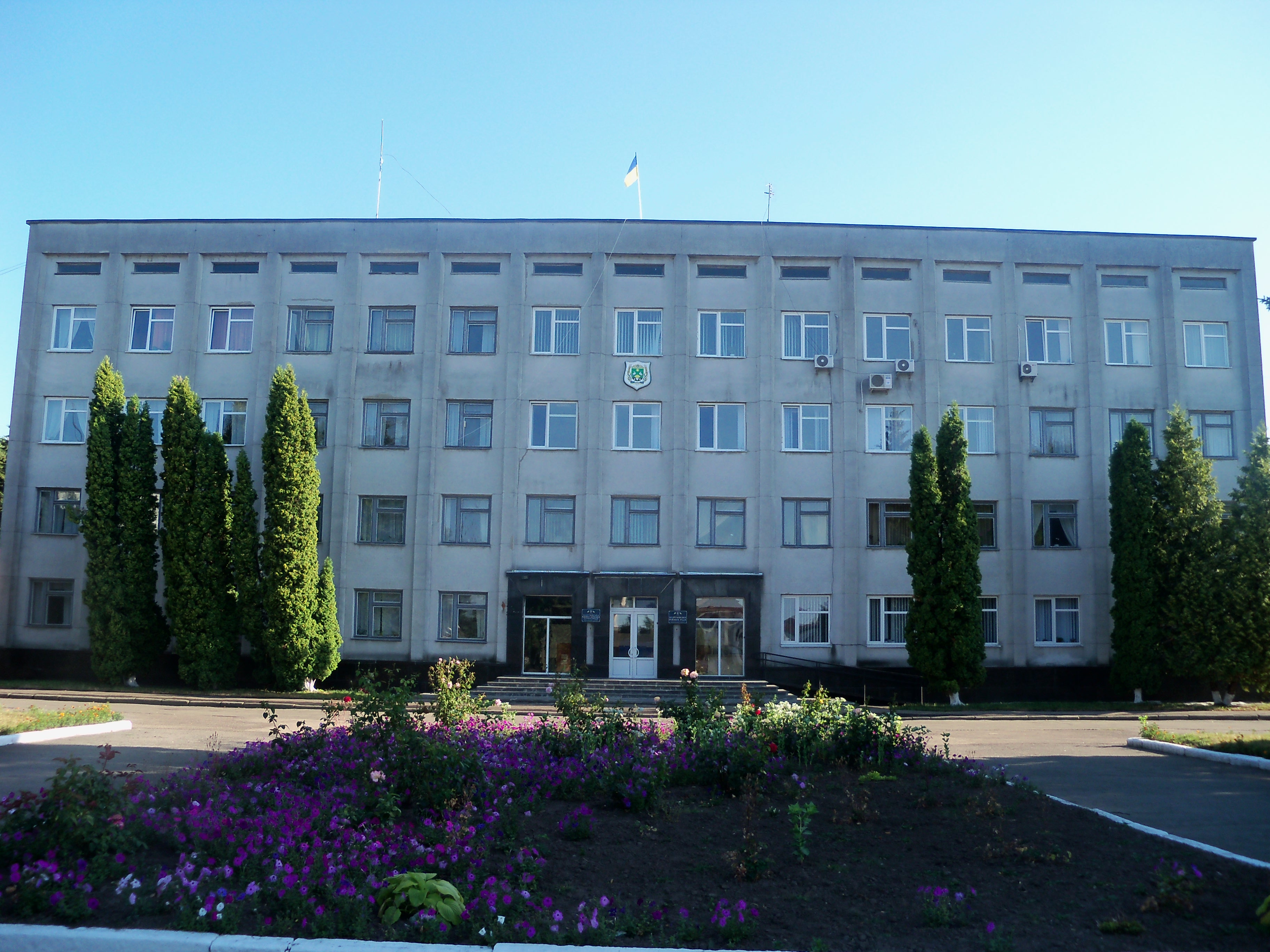
City hall

In 1911 Andrushivka had a population of 2359 people. Soviet power in Andrushevka was first installed in January 1918; during the Russian Civil War Andrushivka repeatedly passed from one government to another until the Soviet authority was finally established June 8, 1920. In August 1920, enterprises were nationalized in Andrushevka. After the administrative-territorial reform in March 1923, Andrushivka became a district center, which had a positive impact on its economic and cultural development. In the years 1927-8 the sugar factory was modernized, which made it possible to increase the output of the plant.

From 1930 to 1932, Andrushivka was under Berdychiv Oblast, from 1932 to 1937 under Kyiv Oblast, and in 1937 finally fell administratively under Zhytomyr Oblast. In 1941 Andrushivka had 5,243 residents and 1,127 households.

During World War II, Andrushivka was under Nazi German occupation from July 10, 1941, to December 27, 1943. Germans tortured and shot 460 civilians of the town, including 216 children and 25 old men, and drove 84 people to forced labor in Germany 84 people. The Germans created a Jewish ghetto in Andrushivka. In May 1942, the ghetto was liquidated and 220 Jewish residents were shot close to the city's hospital. During the war, the sugar factory was bombed. Andrushivka was liberated by Soviet troops on 27 December 1943. Between 9 January and 29 February 1944 in the village housed the command post headquarters of the 1st Ukrainian Front, led by an outstanding Soviet commander, Army General Vatutin. An obelisk was constructed in Andrushivka in honor of fallen soldiers in World War II.

In the postwar period in Andrushevka was restored and its ruined factories renovated, especially the local sugar factory, and new production and social infrastructure began to develop again. In 1975, Andrushivka attained the status of city.

Since the years of independence in Ukraine since 1991, the city has reopened the temples and as of 2011, two new places of worship have been built.

=== 21st century ===
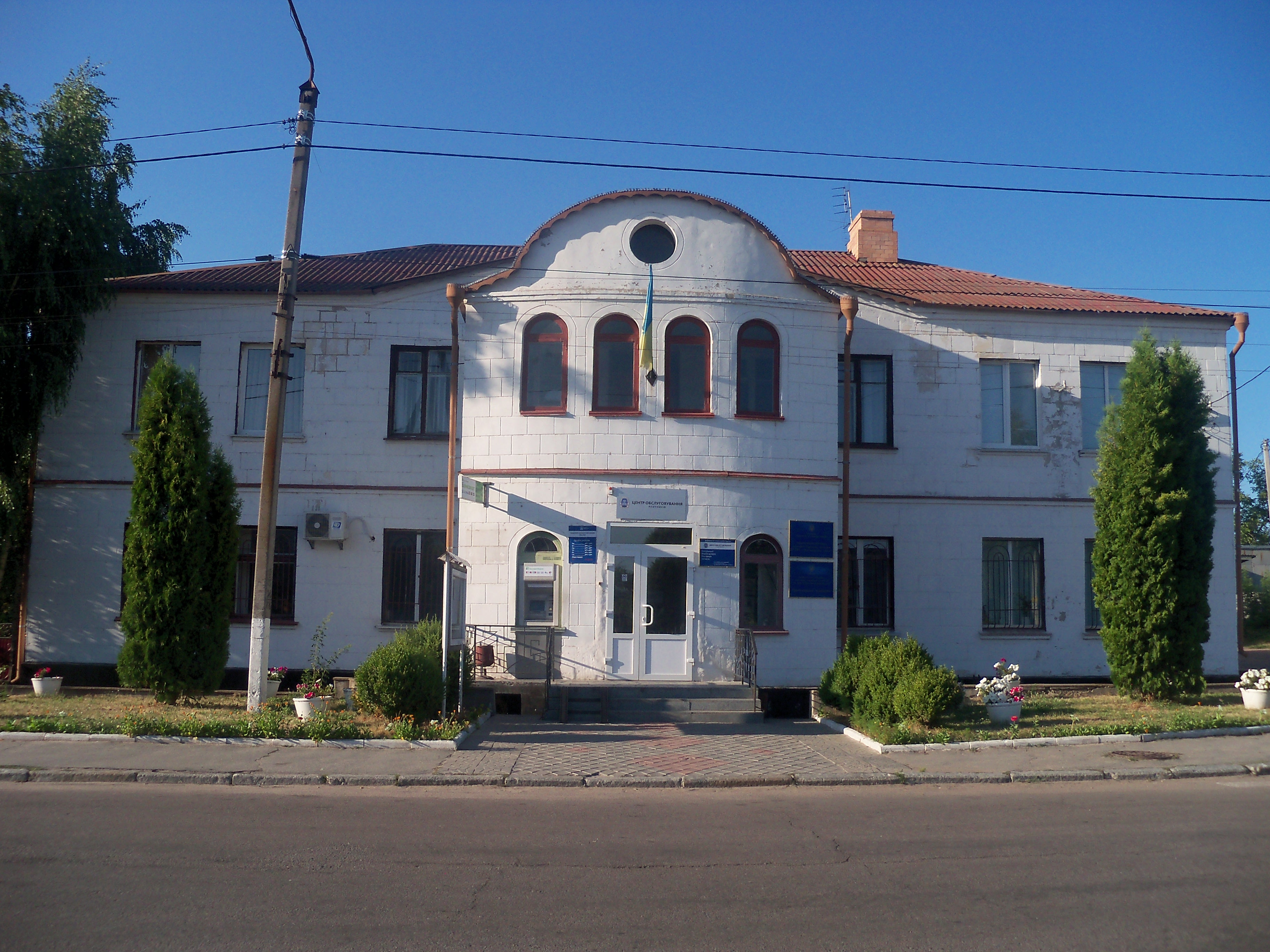
Tax inspection office

In 2001, Andrushivka Astronomical Observatory was built in the city suburbs. on September 18, 2003, the observatory discovered a main-belt asteroid, which was later named after the city, 133293 Andrushivka. On October 17, 2007, (175636) Zvyagel was discovered at the observatory. It was named Zvyagel as it was the 750th anniversary of the city.

== Geography ==
Andrushivka is located in northern-central Ukraine in the south-eastern part of Zhytomyr Oblast. It lies along the T0609 road, which connects it to Voltytsya village in the north where it joins the P18 road which connects it to the regional capital of Zhtomyr to the northwest, and the villages of Zabara and Chervone lie along the T0609 road to the southwest. The nearest major cities are Zhtomyr and Berdychiv to the southwest. The Huyva River flowing past the city flows in a north–south direction in its eastern side and much of the land in the area is flat and agricultural.

== Gallery ==
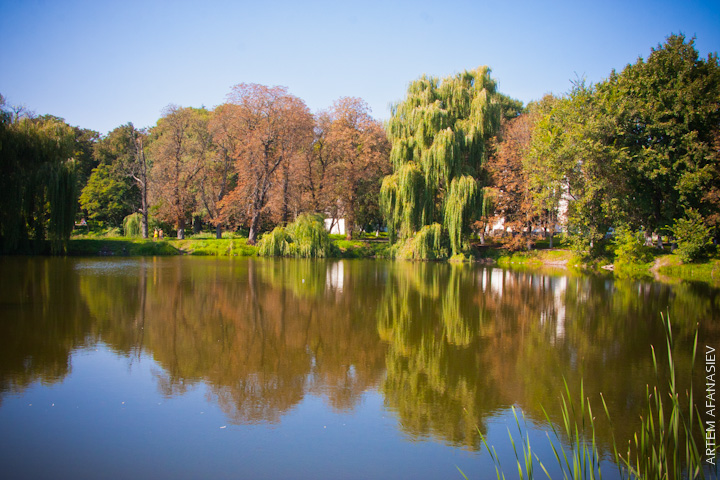
Park

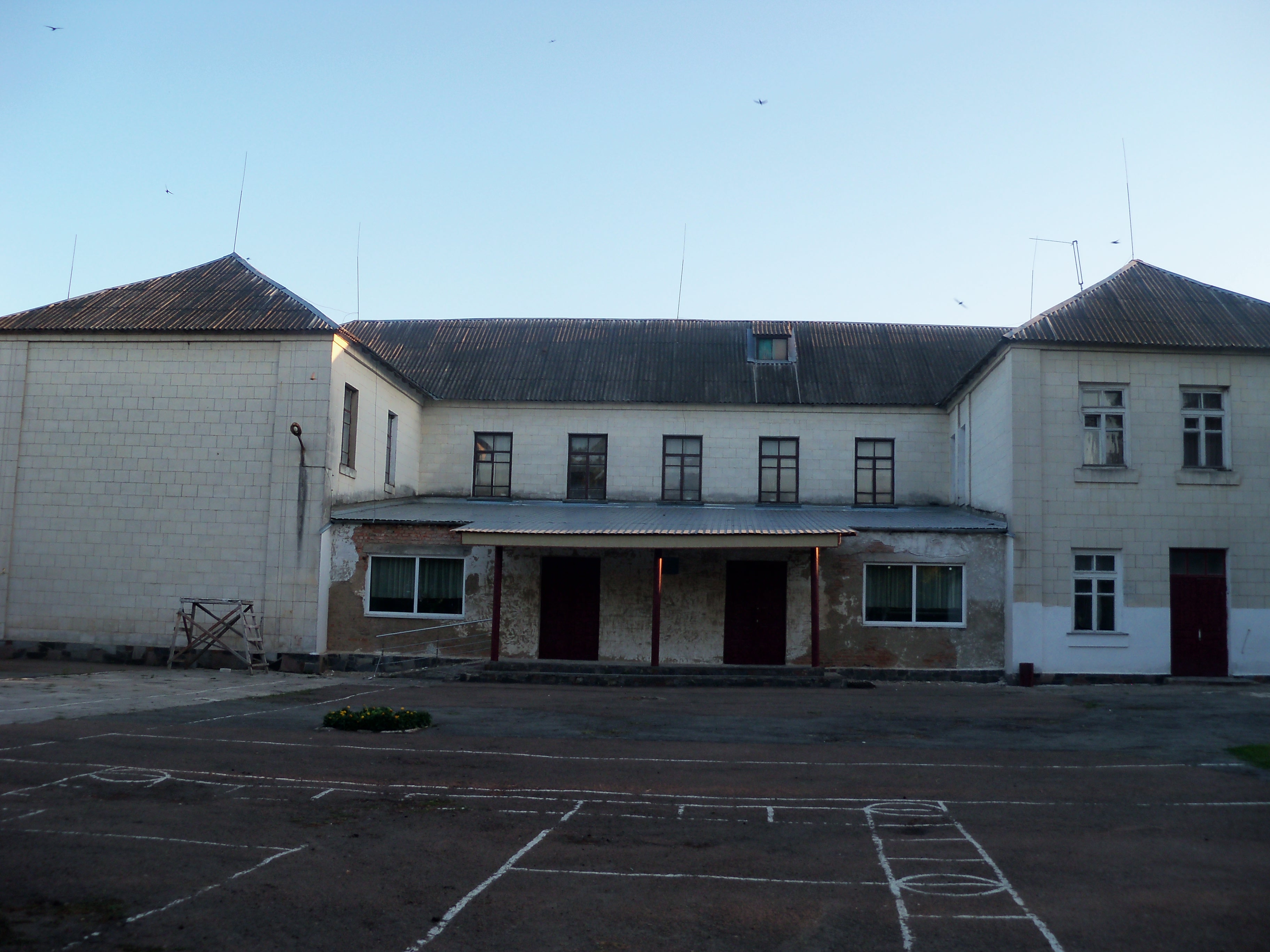
The main building of Andrushivska gymnasium

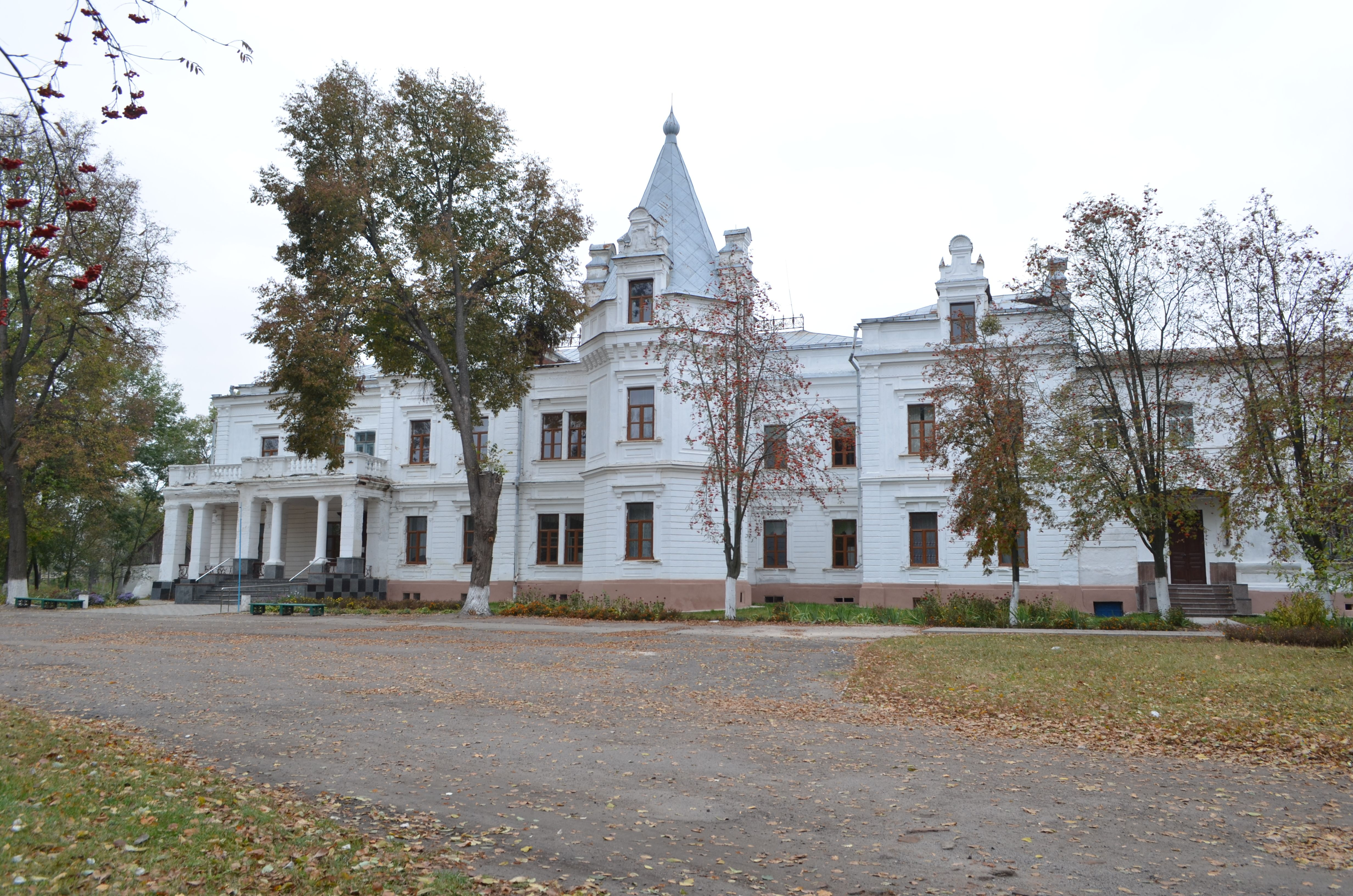
Andrushivska Secondary School

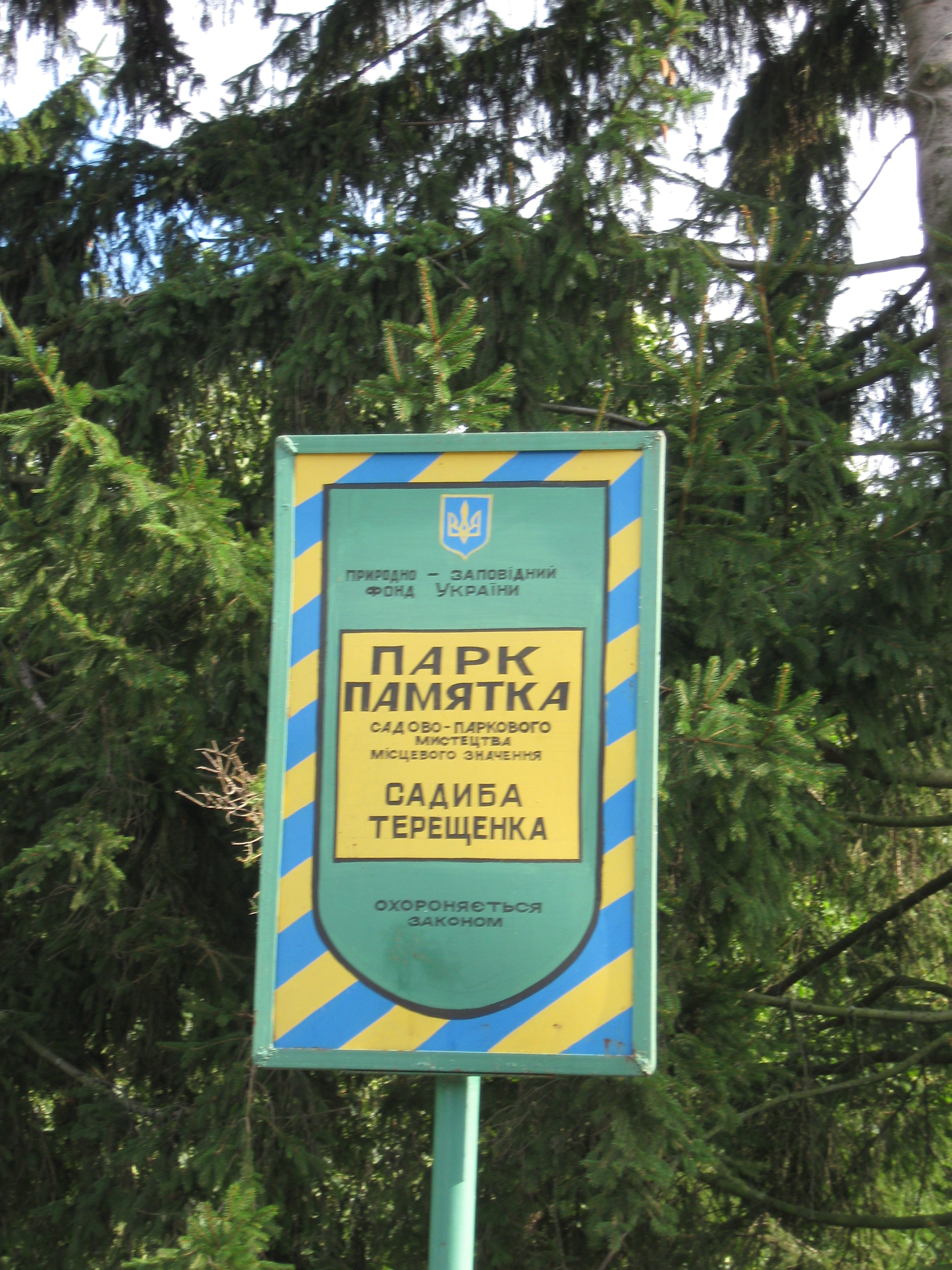
Andrushivskyi Park

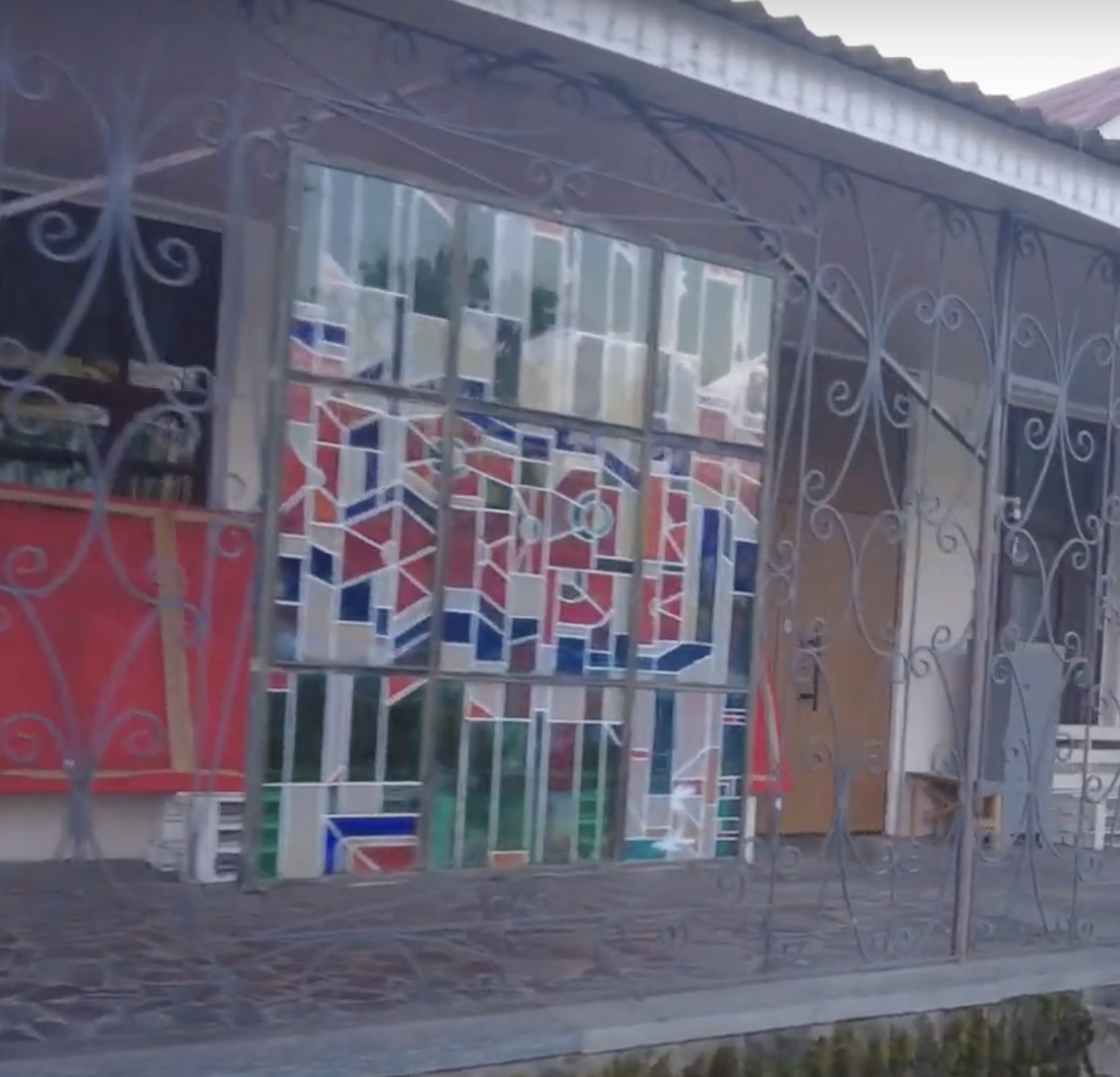
Stained glass windows at the cultural center

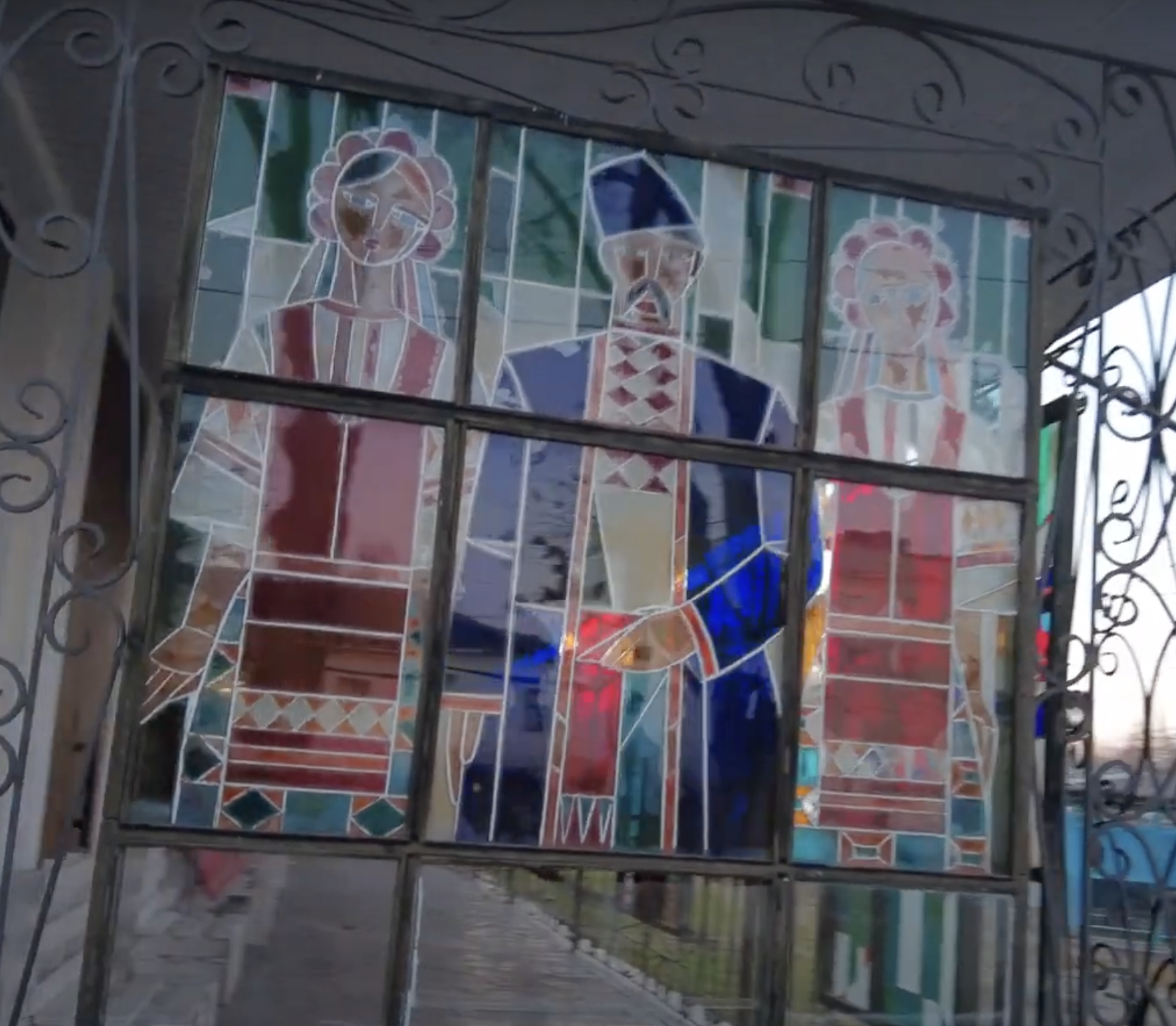
Cultural center

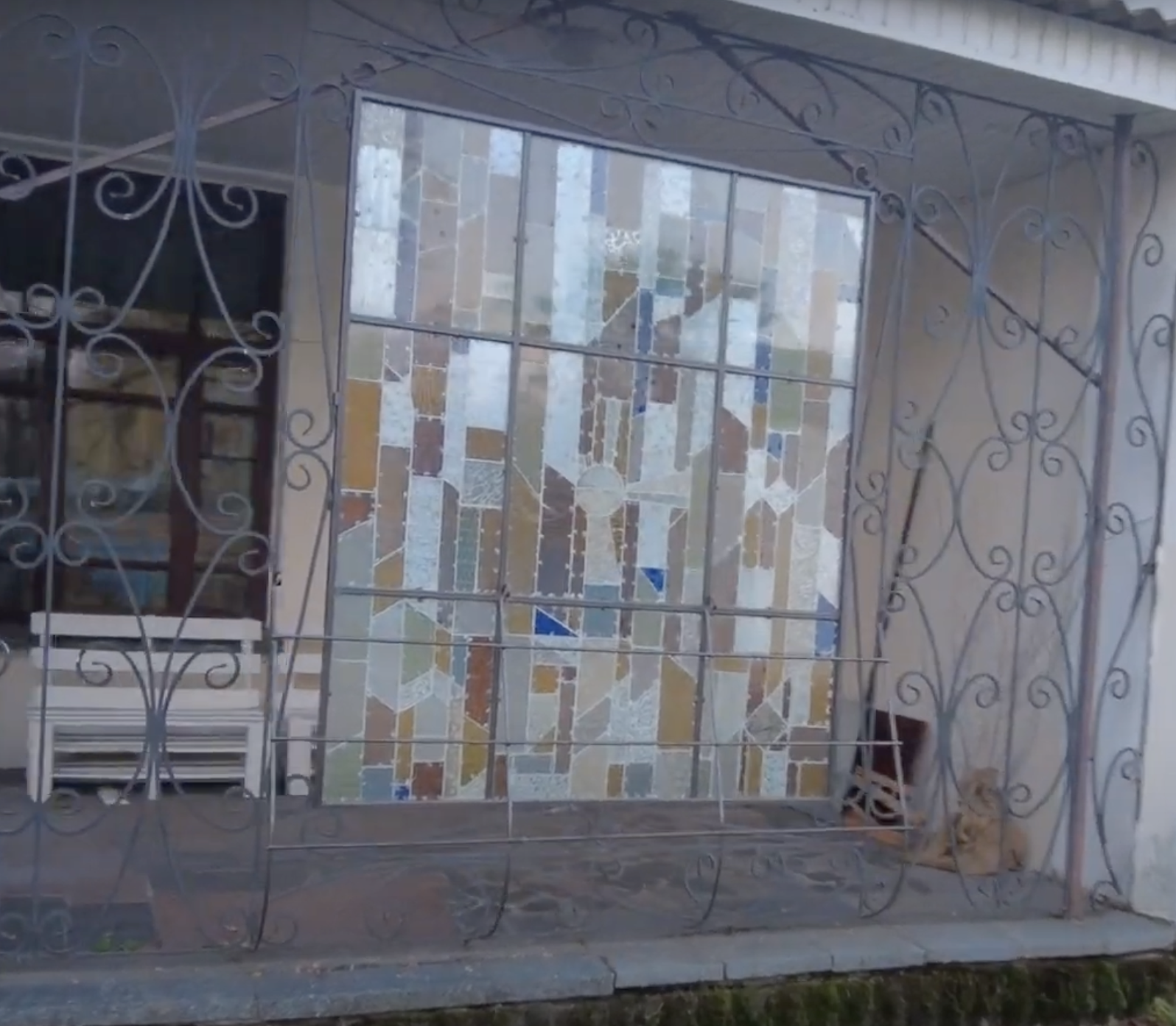
Glass windows at the cultural center

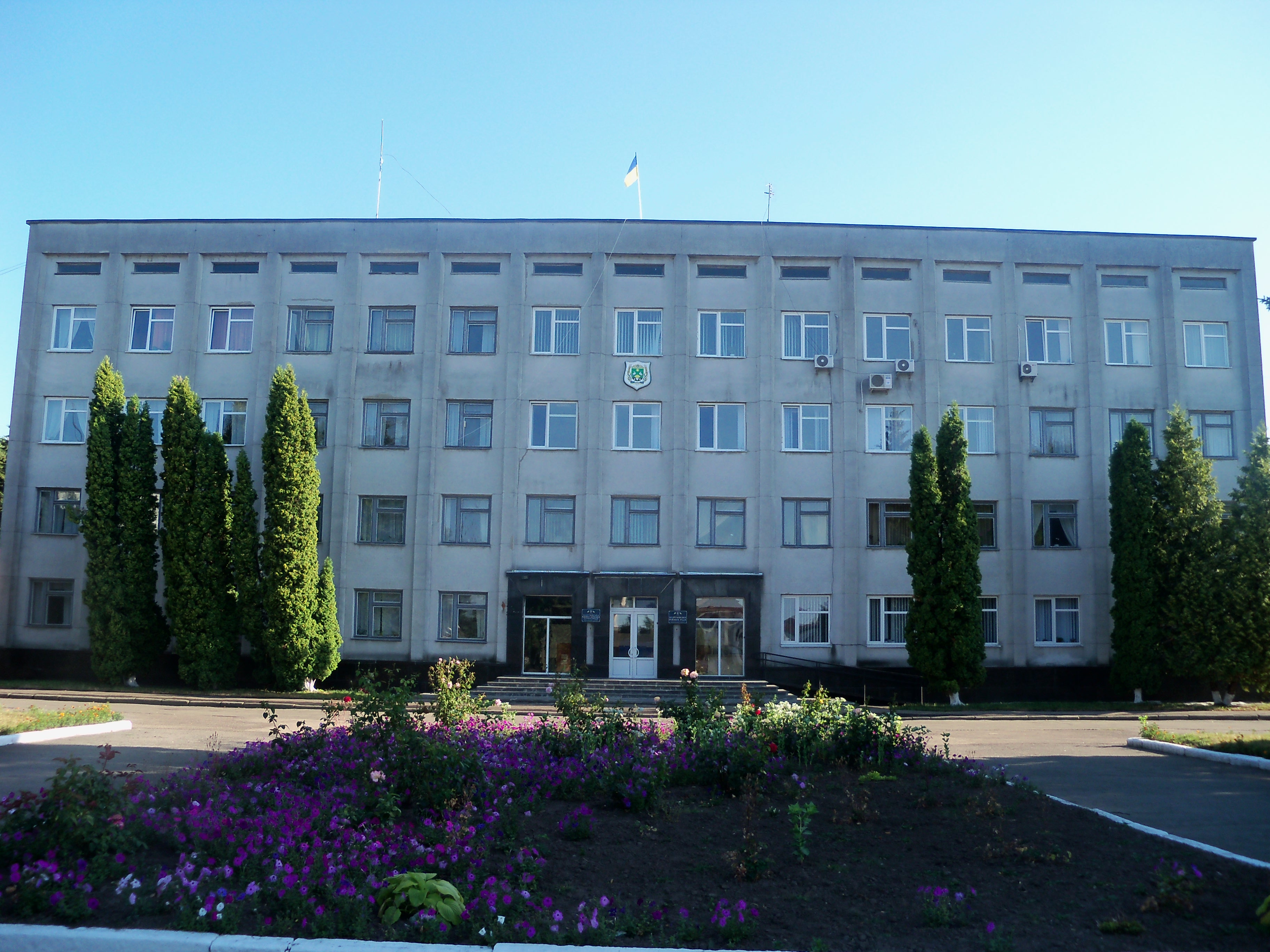
City council

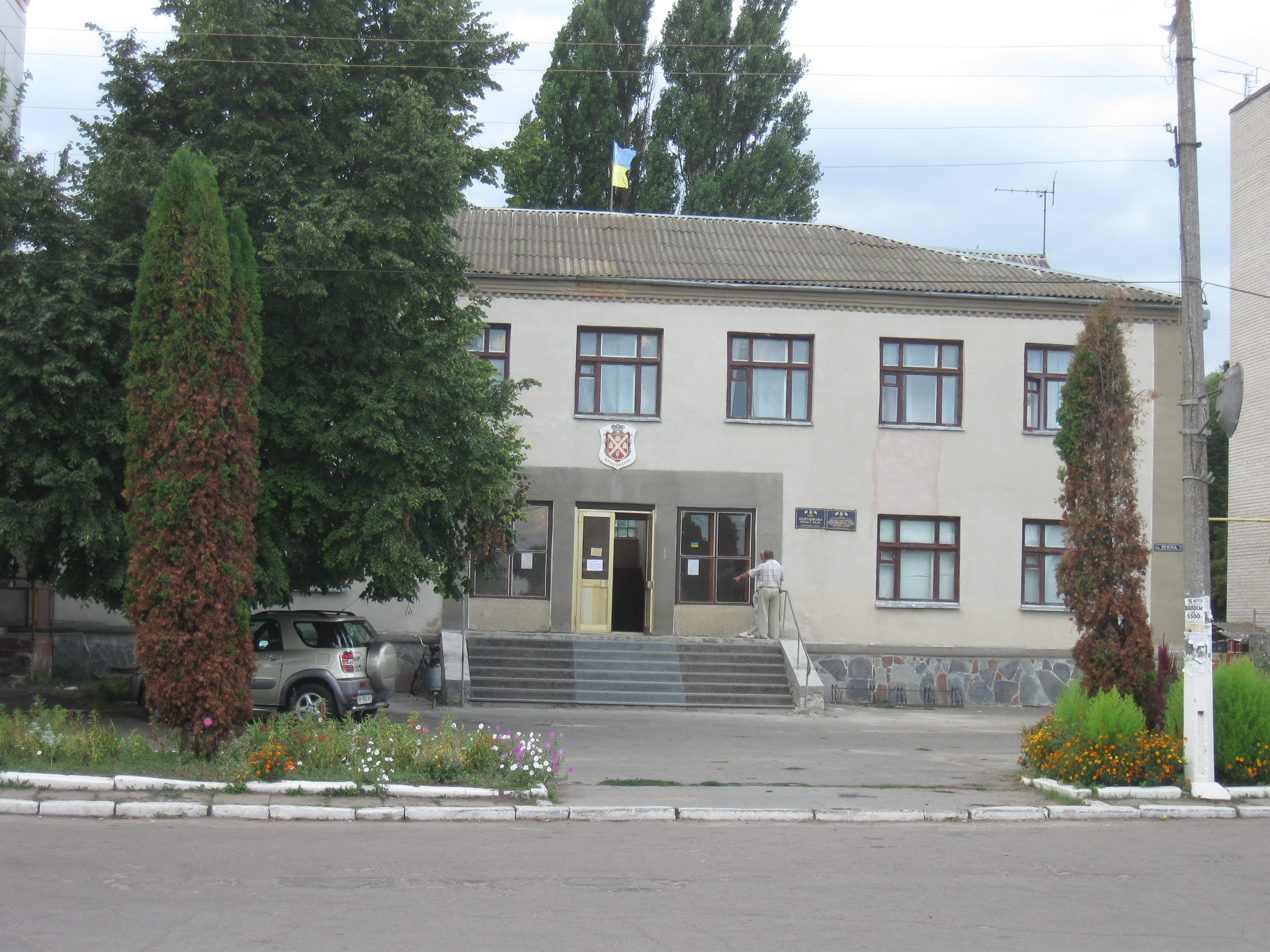
Administrative building

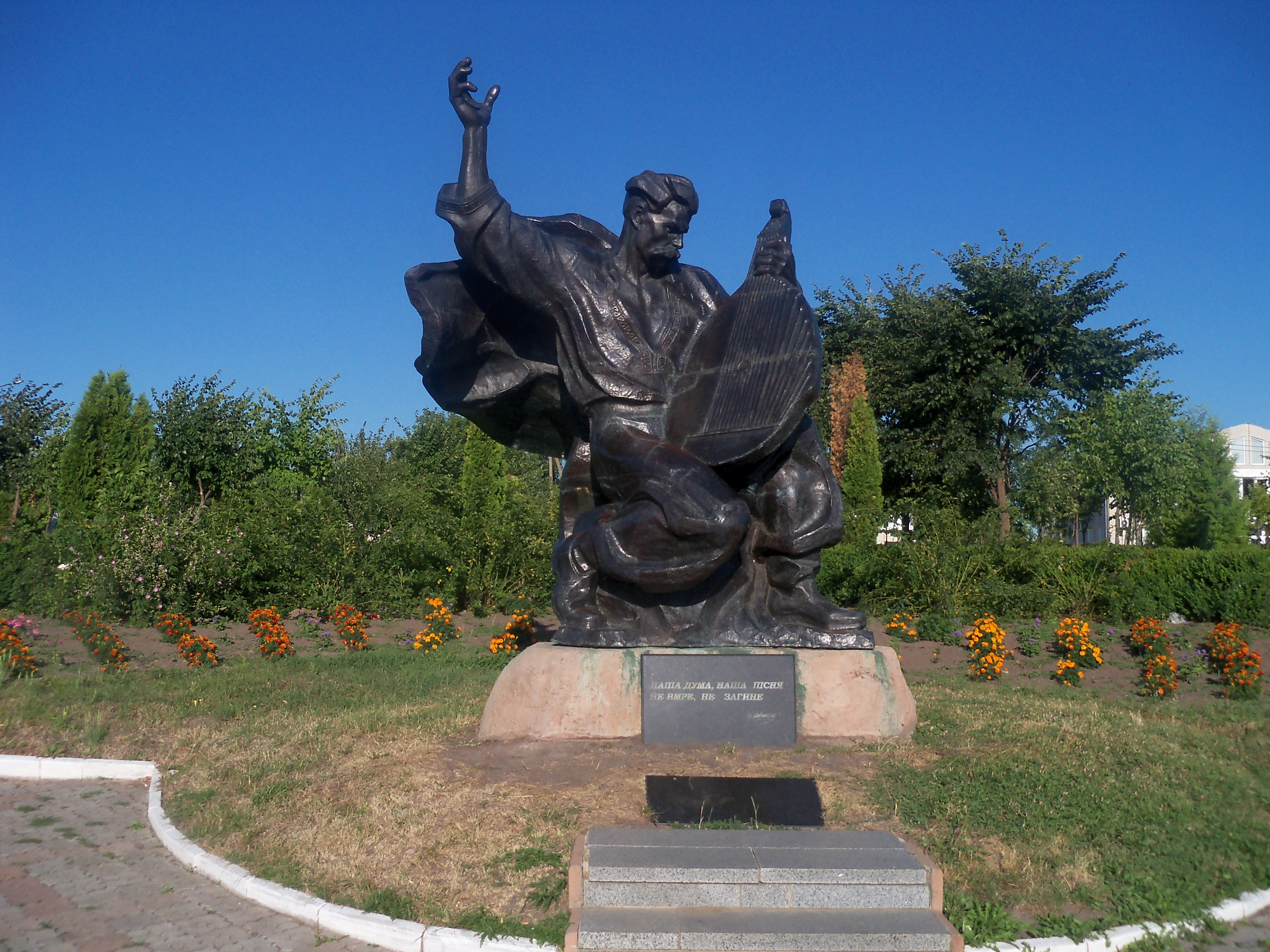
Monument to the bandurist

== Notable landmarks ==
- Andrushivka Astronomical Observatory
- Andrushivka Gymnasium
- Andrushivka obelisk
- Andrushivka railway station
- Andrushivka reservoir
- Andrushivka Sugar Factory
- Andrushivka Urban Youth Arts Centre
- Burzynski Palace
- Jewish Cemetery of Andrushivka
- Tereschenko Palace

== Notable people ==
- L.Y Morozova-Kurek (1887-1952) - poet
- V.Y. Morozov (1890-1966) - poet and translator
- V.A. Zamlynskyy (1930-1993) - doctor of historical sciences
- Anatolii Pidhorny. (1932-1996) - PhD, Member (Academician) of Academy of Sciences of Ukraine
- M.I. Slobodian (1935-) - film critic, Honored Artist of Ukraine, Director of Institute of Screen arts of Kyiv National University Theatre,
- S. Kulik (1960-) - Ukrainian producer of installation.

=== Residents ===
- Valentyn Khovalchuk - painter, master of folk art.
