= Monuments of national significance in Zhytomyr Oblast =

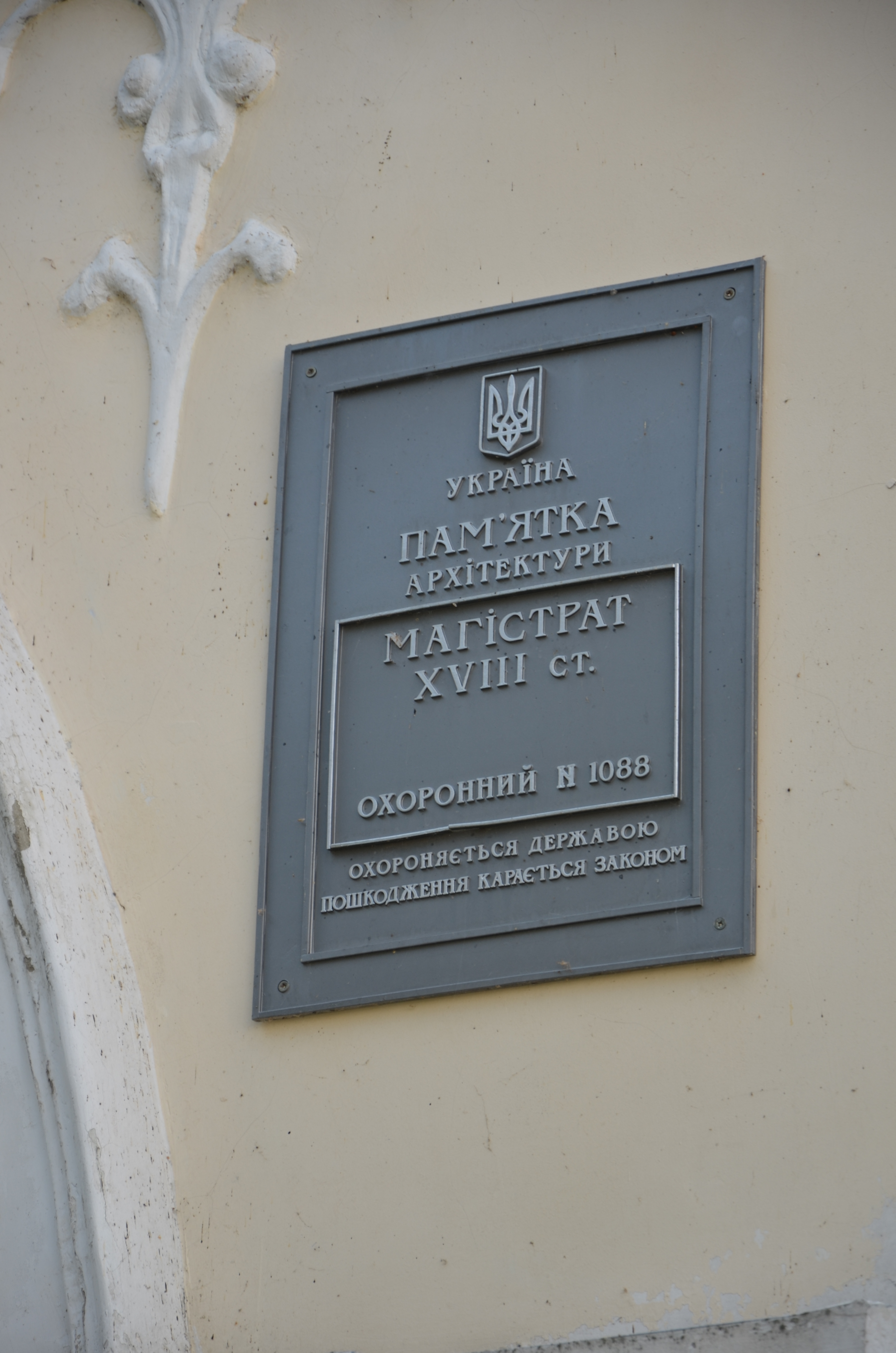
Cultural heritage plaque of the magistrat (town hall) in Zhytomyr

The State Register of Immovable Monuments of Ukraine classifies cultural heritage monuments as either of local or national significance. (Note: 'Monuments of national significance' may also be translated as 'monuments of national importance'; Ukrainian: пам'ятки національного значення) To be classified as nationally significant, a monument must have had a substantial impact on Ukraine's culture, been associated with major historical events or individuals who shaped national culture, represented a masterpiece of creative genius, or embodied a disappeared civilisation or disappeared artistic style. Monuments of national significance are inscribed on the register by the Cabinet of Ministers, and are protected and maintained by the Ministry of Culture. All listed monuments belong to at least one of the following categories: archaeology, history, monumental art, architecture, urban planning, garden and park art, landscape, or science and technology. (Note: The categories are defined as such: Archaeological monuments are underground or underwater remains of human activity that bear testimony to the origin or development of civilisation.; Historic monuments are buildings, structures, burials, and other sites associated with important historical events or the lives and activities of prominent individuals.; Monuments of monumental art are works of fine art.; Architectural monuments are buildings and structures that retain full or partial authenticity and express characteristics of a particular culture, era, style, construction technique, or represent works of renowned architects.; Urban planning monuments are historic neighbourhoods, streets, squares, or ensembles with preserved spatial layouts and architectural integrity.; Monuments of garden and park art combine park construction with natural or anthropogenic landscapes.; Landscape monuments are natural areas possessing historical value.; Monuments of science and technology are industrial, engineering, or scientific sites that reflect the scientific and technological development of an era or discipline.)

The first attempts to establish registers of protected buildings were undertaken in 1917 and 1918 by the Ukrainian People's Republic. These efforts continued in the 1920s in Soviet Ukraine, culminating in the listing of thousands of monuments, but were halted in the 1930s with the dissolution of relevant institutions and the active destruction of cultural—particularly religious—heritage. The listing of cultural heritage monuments in the region was renewed in 1956. A list of architectural monuments was approved in 1963, followed by a separate list of artistic, historic, and archaeological monuments in 1965. Both lists remained in use after Ukraine declared independence in 1991. On 8 June 2000, the State Register of Immovable Monuments was established with the adoption of the law On the Protection of Cultural Heritage. All entries from the Soviet-era list of artistic, historic, and archaeological monuments were transferred to the new register on 14 September 2009. The transfer of monuments from the Soviet architectural register, however, has proceeded more slowly and remains incomplete as of 2026, although the process has accelerated in recent years. At the same time, a number of sites have been deprived of their protected status to comply with decommunisation and derussification laws in effect since 2015 and 2023, respectively.

Zhytomyr Oblast is located in northern Ukraine and contains 58 monuments of national significance. (Note: Two monuments of national significance in the oblast remain on the Soviet-era register: the 18th-century wooden Church of St Michael in Ozera, which was ruined by the 1980s and replaced with a modern building in 2001, and a 19th-century manor in Tiutiunnyky, which was destroyed in the 2000s. These sites are not included in this list.) It is divided into four raions (districts) – Berdychiv, Korosten, Zhytomyr, and Zviahel – which include 12, 7, 35, and 4 monuments of national significance, respectively. Of the total, 43 are classified as architectural monuments, 12 as archaeological, and 3 as historic. Most of the architectural monuments date from the 16th to the 19th centuries. The latest inscriptions date to March 2025. One monument—the Monument to Alexander Pushkin in Zhytomyr—was delisted in 2023.

== Berdychiv Raion ==
Monuments of national significance in Berdychiv Raion
Name (Note: The names listed are unofficial translations as the register is only available in Ukrainian. The official Ukrainian names are shown below each translation, with links to the corresponding Ukrainian Wikipedia articles if applicable.)	Location	Date constructed (Note: Datings of the monuments as indicated on the register)	Date designated (Note: For monuments previously listed on a Soviet-era register, the date of transfer to the modern register is indicated.)	Coordinates	Type	Protection number (Note: Every monument is assigned a unique protection number, and those of national significance located in Zhytomyr Oblast start with the digits 06.)	Photo	Ref.
Palace Палац	Andrushivka	2nd half of the 19th century	7 March 2025	50.01647°N 29.02353°E	Architectural	060023	More images	
Church of St Barbara Костьол Варвари	Berdychiv	Mid-19th century	7 March 2025	49.89324°N 28.58850°E	Architectural	060024	More images	
Carmelite Monastery Кармелітський монастир	Berdychiv	16th–18th centuries	7 March 2025	49.89798°N 28.57466°E	Architectural	060025	More images	
Church with cells Костьол з келіями	Berdychiv	17th–18th centuries	7 March 2025	49.89760°N 28.57493°E	Architectural	060025/1	More images	
Gate building Прибрамний корпус	Berdychiv	18th century	7 March 2025	49.89740°N 28.57528°E	Architectural	060025/2	More images	
Fortress walls with towers and cells Кріпосні мури з баштами та келіями	Berdychiv	16th–18th centuries	7 March 2025	49.89831°N 28.57453°E	Architectural	060025/3	More images	
Palace Палац	Verkhivnia	17th century	7 March 2025	49.80246°N 29.32306°E	Architectural	060026/1	More images	
Outbuilding Флігель	Verkhivnia	17th century	7 March 2025	49.80252°N 29.32218°E	Architectural	060026/2	More images	
Outbuilding Флігель	Verkhivnia	17th century	7 March 2025	49.80202°N 29.32330°E	Architectural	060026/3	More images	
Church Костьол	Verkhivnia	1810	7 March 2025	49.80166°N 29.32413°E	Architectural	060026/4	More images	
Hillforts of the legendary city of Niiatyn (2) Городища літописного міста Ніятина (2)	Yahniatyn	12th–13th centuries	14 September 2009	49.76014°N 29.30641°E	Archaeological	060016-Н		
Hillfort of the legendary city of Yaropolch Городище літописного міста Ярополча	Yaropovychi	9th–13th centuries	14 September 2009	50.08646°N 29.19357°E	Archaeological	060004-Н	More images	

== Korosten Raion ==
Monuments of national significance in Korosten Raion
Name	Location	Date constructed	Date designated	Coordinates	Type	Protection number	Photo	Ref.
Hillfort, posad, settlement, and kurgan cemeteries (2) Городище, посад, поселення і курганні могильники (2)	Horodets	9th–13th centuries	14 September 2009		Archaeological	060013-Н	51.38556°N 28.23304°E	
Hillforts of the legendary city of Iskorosten (3), settlement and kurgan cemeteries (2) Городища літописного міста Іскоростеня (3), поселення і курганні могильники (2)	Korosten	8th–18th centuries	14 September 2009	50.94762°N 28.64947°E	Archaeological	060007-Н	More images	
St Nicholas Church and bell tower (wooden) Миколаївська церква та дзвіниця (дерев'яна)	Mezhyrichka	1772	7 March 2025	51.07809°N 28.77091°E	Architectural	060039	More images	
Hillfort, posad, settlement and kurgan cemeteries (2) Городище, посад, поселення і курганні могильники (2)	Olevsk	9th century BCE – 4th century CE, 9th–13th centuries	14 September 2009	51.23581°N 27.66718°E	Archaeological	060014-Н	More images	
St Nicholas Church Миколаївська церква	Olevsk	1596	7 March 2025	51.22261°N 27.64746°E	Architectural	060041	More images	
St Basil's Church and monastic buildings Василівська церква та монастирські споруди	Ovruch	12th–20th centuries	7 March 2025	51.31542°N 28.79969°E	Architectural	060040	More images	
Church (wooden) Церква (дерев'яна)	Zhubrovychi	17th century	7 March 2025	51.07103°N 27.87536°E	Architectural	060042	More images	

== Zhytomyr Raion ==
Monuments of national significance in Zhytomyr Raion
Name	Location	Date constructed	Date designated	Coordinates	Type	Protection number	Photo	Ref.
Hillforts of the legendary city of Horodesk (3) Городища літописного міста Городеська (3)	Horodske	3rd millennium BCE, 9th–13th centuries	14 September 2009	50.37662°N 29.16600°E	Archaeological	060008-Н	More images	
Manor Садиба	Ivnytsia	2nd half of the 18th – early 20th centuries	7 March 2025	50.14341°N 29.03789°E	Architectural	060027	More images	
Service house and gate Господарський будинок і брама	Ivnytsia	2nd half of the 19th – early 20th centuries	7 March 2025	50.14348°N 29.03791°E	Architectural	060027/1	More images More images	
Fence towers Башти огорожі	Ivnytsia	2nd half of the 18th century	7 March 2025	50.14347°N 29.03851°E	Architectural	060027/2	More images	
Exaltation Church and bell tower (wooden) Здвиженська церква та дзвіниця (дерев'яна)	Kamianyi Brid (Note: The location is erroneously identified as a rural settlement of the same name in Zviahel Raion on the register.)	17th century	7 March 2025	—	Architectural	060038	More images	
Mass grave of participants of the Haydamaka uprising "Koliivshchyna" Братська могила учасників гайдамацького повстання "Коліївщина"	Kodnia	1767	14 September 2009	50.08326°N 28.72517°E	Historic	060005-Н	More images	
Nativity of the Theotokos Church and bell tower Різдвобогородицька церква та дзвіниця	Kodnia	1841	7 March 2025	50.07869°N 28.69522°E	Architectural	060031	More images	
Hillfort of the legendary city of Kolodiazhyn Городище літописного міста Колодяжина	Kolodiazhne	12th–13th centuries	14 September 2009	50.07712°N 27.69387°E	Archaeological	060015-Н	More images	
St Michael's Church (wooden) Михайлівська церква (дерев'яна)	Kraivshchyna	1757	7 March 2025	50.74083°N 28.37471°E	Architectural	060035	More images	
Trinity Church and bell tower Троїцький костьол з дзвіницею	Lishchyn	1805	7 March 2025	50.15419°N 28.84640°E	Architectural	060032	More images	
Manor house Садибний будинок	Lishchyn	1st half of the 19th century	7 March 2025	50.15555°N 28.83883°E	Architectural	060033	More images	
Basilian monastery school building Будинок школи Василіанського монастиря	Liubar	2nd half of the 18th century	7 March 2025	49.92585°N 27.75293°E	Architectural	060029	More images	
Manor Садиба	Nova Chortoryia	18th–19th centuries	7 March 2025	50.02795°N 27.69769°E	Architectural	060030	More images	
Palace Палац	Nova Chortoryia	18th – 2nd half of the 19th centuries	7 March 2025	50.02800°N 27.69834°E	Architectural	060030/1	More images	
Gate Брама	Nova Chortoryia	2nd half of the 19th century	7 March 2025	50.02859°N 27.69786°E	Architectural	060030/2	More images	
Steam mill Паровий млин	Nova Chortoryia	Late 19th century	7 March 2025	50.02700°N 27.69127°E	Architectural	060030/3	More images	
Hillfort Городище	Stanyshivka	9th–13th centuries, 14th–18th centuries	14 September 2009	50.22135°N 28.71296°E	Archaeological	060006-Н	More images	
Hillfort of the legendary city of Kotelnych and settlement Городище літописного міста Котельнича і поселення	Stara Kotelnia	9th–13th centuries	14 September 2009	50.10323°N 28.94659°E	Archaeological	060003-Н	More images	
Church Костьол	Stara Kotelnia	2nd half of the 18th century	7 March 2025	50.10315°N 28.94833°E	Architectural	060028	More images	
Church and cells of the Tryhiria Trinity Monastery Церква та келії Тригірського Троїцького монастиря	Tryhiria	18th–19th centuries	7 March 2025	50.19846°N 28.37262°E	Architectural	060034	More images	
Manor Садиба	Turchynivka	2nd half of the 19th century	7 March 2025	50.02882°N 28.26150°E	Architectural	060036	More images	
Palace Палац	Turchynivka	2nd half of the 19th century	7 March 2025	50.02888°N 28.26192°E	Architectural	060036/1	More images	
Service building Господарський корпус	Turchynivka	2nd half of the 19th century	7 March 2025	50.02858°N 28.26120°E	Architectural	060036/2	More images	
Hillfort of the legendary city of Derevych Городище літописного міста Деревича	Velyki Derevychi	9th–13th centuries	14 September 2009	49.97446°N 27.57478°E	Archaeological	060009-Н	More images	
Grave of the writer and translator Borys Ten (M. V. Khomychevskyi) Могила письменника і перекладача Бориса Тена (М. В. Хомичевського)	Zhytomyr	1983	14 September 2009	50.23676°N 28.70488°E	Historic	060002-Н	More images	
Cathedral of St Sophia and bell tower Кафедральний костьол Св. Софії та дзвіниця	Zhytomyr	1746	24 November 2023	50.25496°N 28.65468°E	Architectural	060017	More images	
Magistrat Магістрат	Zhytomyr	1805	24 November 2023	50.25331°N 28.65277°E	Architectural	060018	More images	
Seminary church Семінарійський костьол	Zhytomyr	1838	24 November 2023	50.25526°N 28.66017°E	Architectural	060019	More images	
Cells of the Jesuit Monastery Келії єзуїтського монастиря	Zhytomyr	1724	24 November 2023	50.25198°N 28.65579°E	Architectural	060020	More images	
Saviour-Transfiguration Cathedral Спасо-Преображенський кафедральний собор	Zhytomyr	1874	24 November 2023	50.25749°N 28.65756°E	Architectural	060021	More images	
Building complex of the "Zhytomyr" Post Office Комплекс будівель поштової станції «Житомир»	Zhytomyr	Mid-19th century	24 November 2023	50.26932°N 28.64918°E	Architectural	060022		
Post office building and fence Будинок поштової станції та огорожа	Zhytomyr	Mid-19th century	24 November 2023	50.26926°N 28.64881°E	Architectural	060022/1	More images	
Hotel Готель	Zhytomyr	Mid-19th century	24 November 2023	50.26905°N 28.64924°E	Architectural	060022/2		
Stables Стайні	Zhytomyr	Mid-19th century	24 November 2023	50.26880°N 28.64910°E	Architectural	060022/3	More images	
Postal outbuildings Ямські служби	Zhytomyr	Mid-19th century	24 November 2023	50.26902°N 28.64884°E	Architectural	060022/4	More images	

== Zviahel Raion ==
Monuments of national significance in Zviahel Raion
Name	Location	Date constructed	Date designated	Coordinates	Type	Protection number	Photo	Ref.
Hillforts of the legendary city of Vozviahel (2) and posad Городища літописного міста Возвягеля (2) і посад	Chyzhivka	9th–13th centuries	14 September 2009	50.62833°N 27.62925°E	Archaeological	060012-Н	More images	
Kurgan cemeteries (2) Курганні могильники (2)	Khodurky	9th–13th centuries	14 September 2009	50.76617°N 27.48354°E	Archaeological	060011-Н		
St Paraskeva's Church (wooden) Парасківська церква (дерев'яна)	Riasne	1771	7 March 2025	50.77369°N 28.12151°E	Architectural	060037	More images	
House where the poet and public figure Lesya Ukrainka was born and lived Будинок, в якому народилася і жила поетеса та громадська діячка Леся Українка	Zviahel	1871–1872	14 September 2009	50.59133°N 27.63080°E	Historic	060010-Н	More images	

== See also ==
- List of historic reserves in Ukraine
- Ukrainian architecture
