= Zhytomyr (disambiguation) =

Zhytomyr is a Ukrainian city. It may also refer to:

- Zhytomyr Oblast
- Zhytomyr Oblast Football Association
- Zhytomyr Oblast Council
- Zhytomyr attacks (2022–present)
- Zhytomyr Raion
- Zhytomyr International Airport
- Zhytomyr urban hromada
- FC Polissya Zhytomyr
- Flag of Zhytomyr Oblast
- Monuments of national significance in Zhytomyr Oblast
- 2024–25 FC Polissya Zhytomyr season
- 2023–24 FC Polissya Zhytomyr season
- Zhytomyr Border Detachment
- 75th Zhytomyr Battalion (Ukraine)
- Governor of Zhytomyr Oblast
- Roman Catholic Diocese of Kyiv-Zhytomyr
