= Chervone, Zhytomyr Oblast =

Rural settlement in Zhytomyr Oblast, Ukraine

Chervone Червоне
- Rural settlement
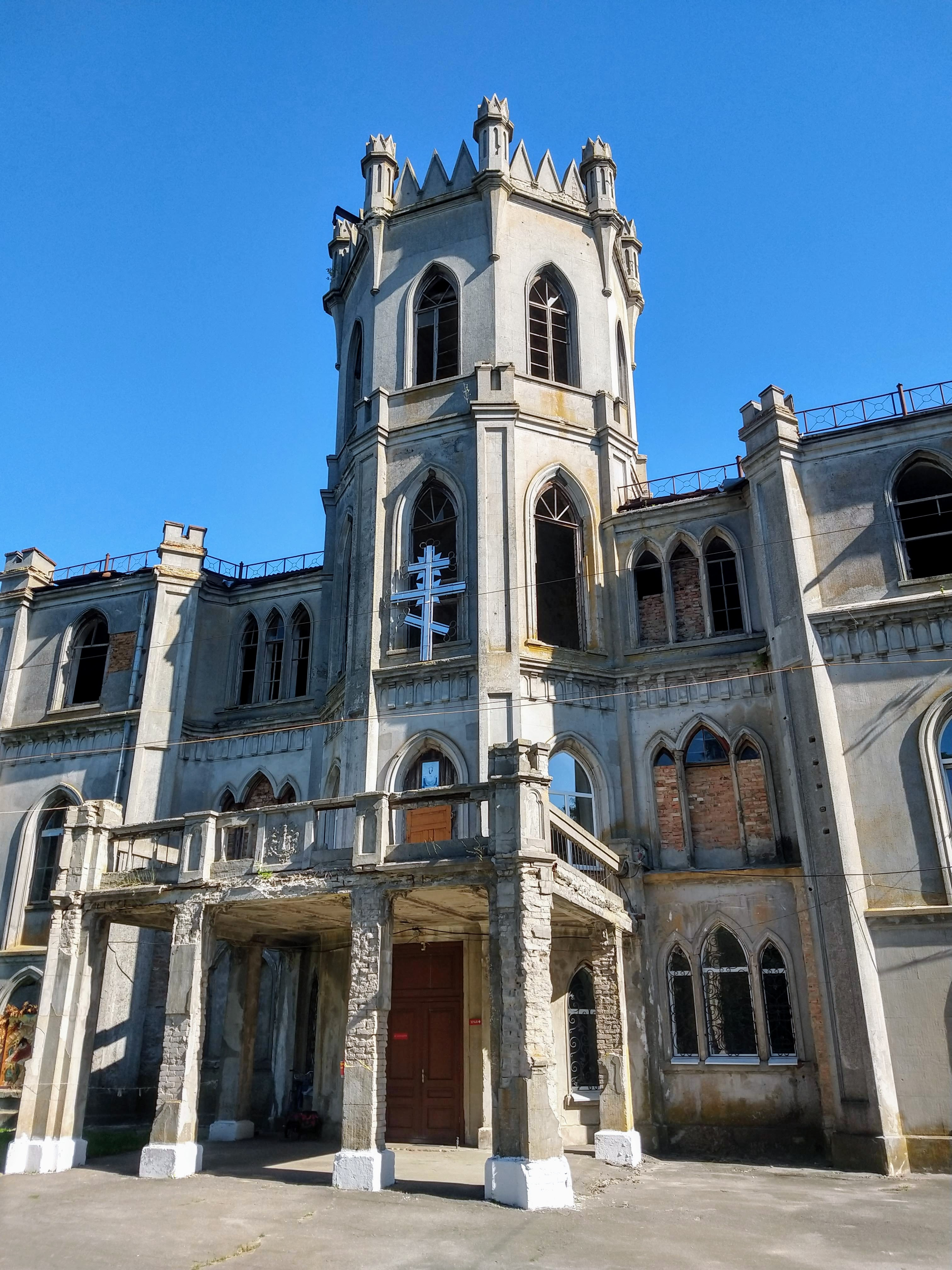
- Tereshchenko Palace in Chervone

- Location within Zhytomyr Oblast Location within Ukraine
- Coordinates: 49.9497°N 28.8686°E
- Country: Ukraine
- Oblast: Zhytomyr Oblast
- Raion: Berdychiv Raion
- Time zone: UTC+2 (EET)
  - Summer (DST): UTC+3 (EEST)

Chervone (Ukrainian: Червоне) is a rural settlement in Berdychiv Raion, Zhytomyr Oblast, Ukraine. Population: 2,709 (2022 estimate).

== History ==
Until 26 January 2024, Chervone was designated urban-type settlement. On this day, a new law entered into force which abolished this status, and Chervone became a rural settlement.

The Tereshchenko estate built in 1851, an object of cultural heritage, is located in the village.
