= Huiva (river) =

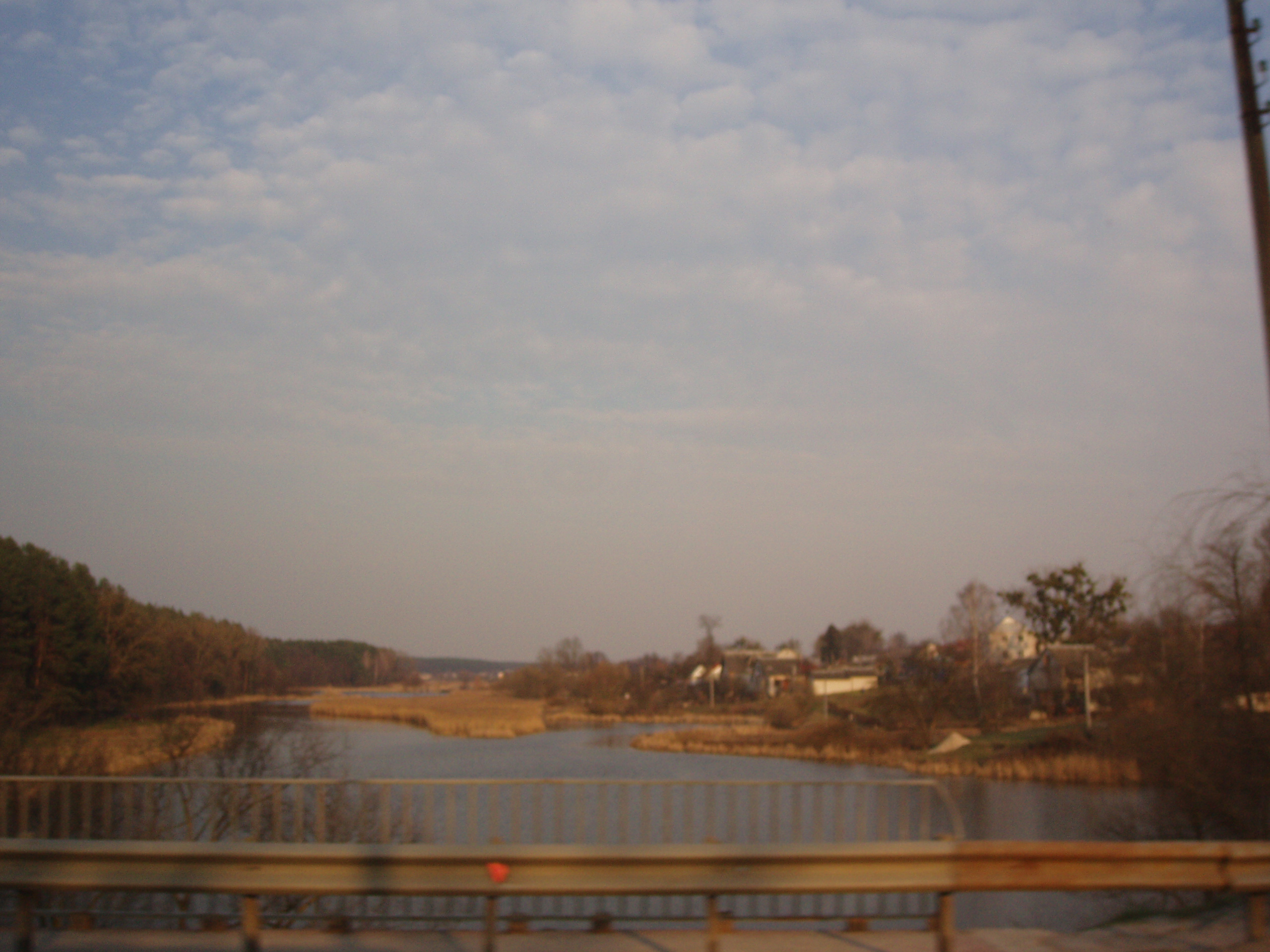

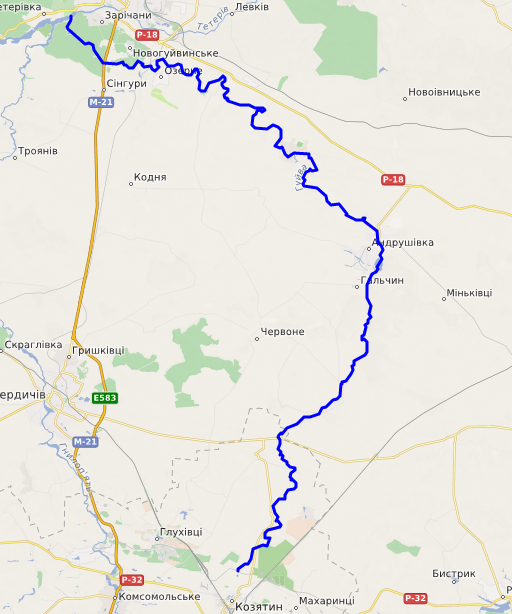

Location
- Country: Ukraine

Physical characteristics
- Mouth: Teteriv
  - coordinates: 50.2246°N 28.6326°E
- Length: 97 km (60 mi)
- Basin size: 1,505 km^{2} (581 sq mi)

Basin features
- Progression: Teteriv→ Dnieper→ Dnieper–Bug estuary→ Black Sea

The Huiva (Ukrainian: Гуйва; Russian: Гуйва, romanized: Guyva) is a river of northern Ukraine, flowing through the territory of Khmilnyk Raion of Vinnytsia Oblast and Berdychiv Raion and Zhytomyr Raion of Zhytomyr Oblast. It is a right tributary of the Teteriv.

The river has a length of 97 km and basin area of 1505 km ². The Huiva flows through the cities of Koziatyn and Andrushivka.

The biggest tributaries are: Pustoha, Kodenka.
