= Vatutin =

Vatutin (Russian: Ватутин) is a Russian masculine surname, its feminine counterpart is Vatutina. Notable people with the surname include:

- Alexey Vatutin (born 1992), Russian tennis player
- Nikolai Vatutin (1901–1944), Soviet military commander
