= Tereshchenko Palace =

Coordinates: 50°0′58″N 29°1′27″E

- Палац Терещенків
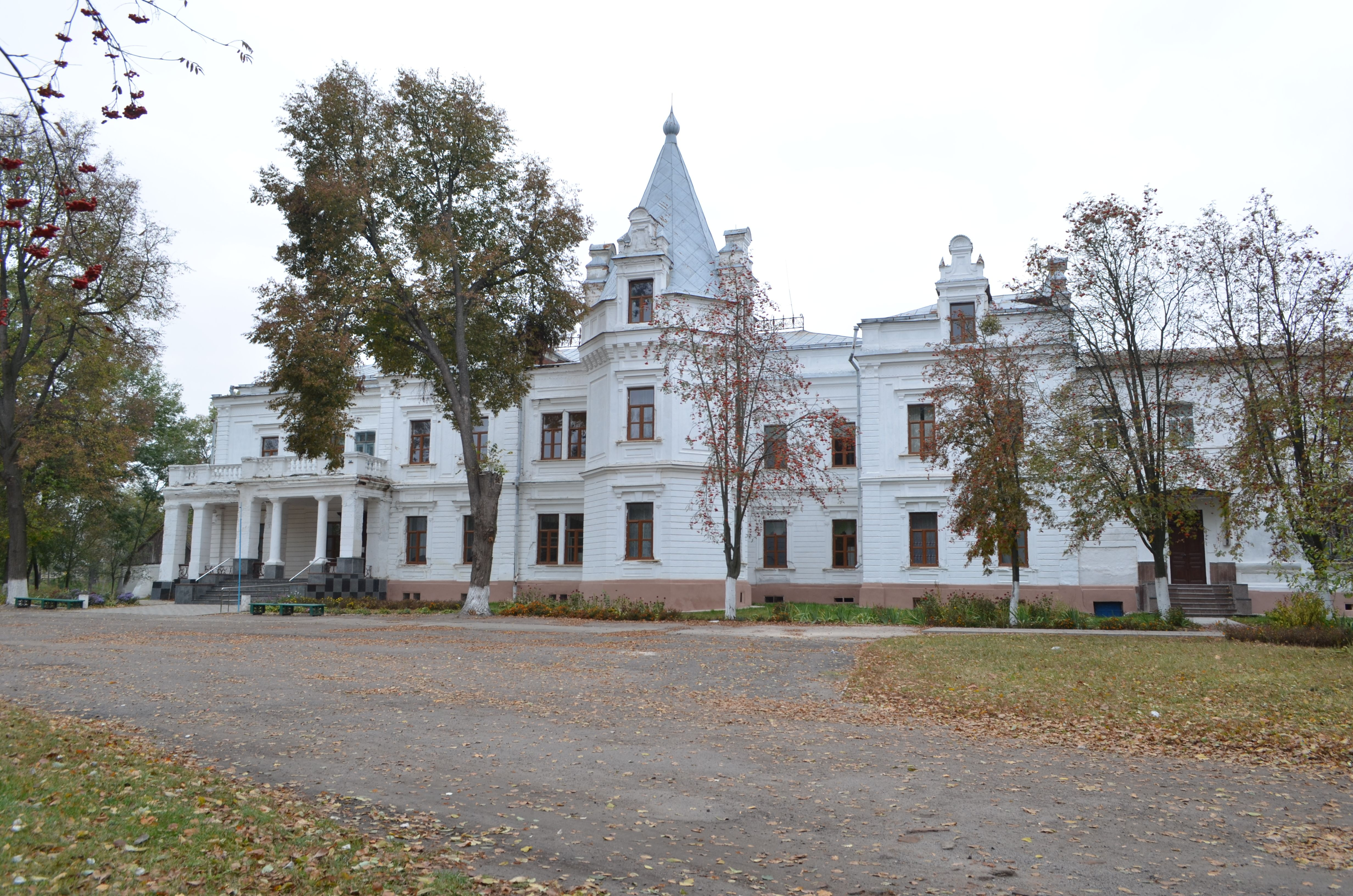
- Facade of the palace
- Interactive map of the Tereshchenko Palace area

General information
- Location: Andrushivka, Zhytomyr Oblast, Ukraine
- Completed: 19th century

Immovable Monument of National Significance of Ukraine
- Official name: Палац (Palace)
- Type: Architecture
- Reference no.: 060023

The Tereshchenko Palace is a palace in Andrushivka, Zhytomyr Oblast, Ukraine. Currently it houses a comprehensive school.

== History ==
Artemy Tereshchenko, a sugar baron of the wealthy Tereshchenko family of entrepreneurs, bought Andrusivka together with its sugar factory and palace from Stanisław Bierzyński. Tereshchenko rebuilt the original brick palace to the style of French Renaissance Revival architecture. The palace is in a park.

On 25 January 1919 the Volyn Revolutionary Committee was organized there, and in June 1920 the headquarters of the 1st Cavalry Army or Semyon Budyonny were housed.

It was renovated and extended in 1975 and a second floor built over the greenhouse, which was between the palace proper and the utility building. The interior has the original marble stairs, and the remains of the ancient Greek style ornament on the wall. There is also a preserved old desk used by Tereshchenko. By the palace there are outbuildings: stables and other buildings. To the rear of the palace, in front of the main facade, there is a large fountain of unknown origin.
