= Teteriv =

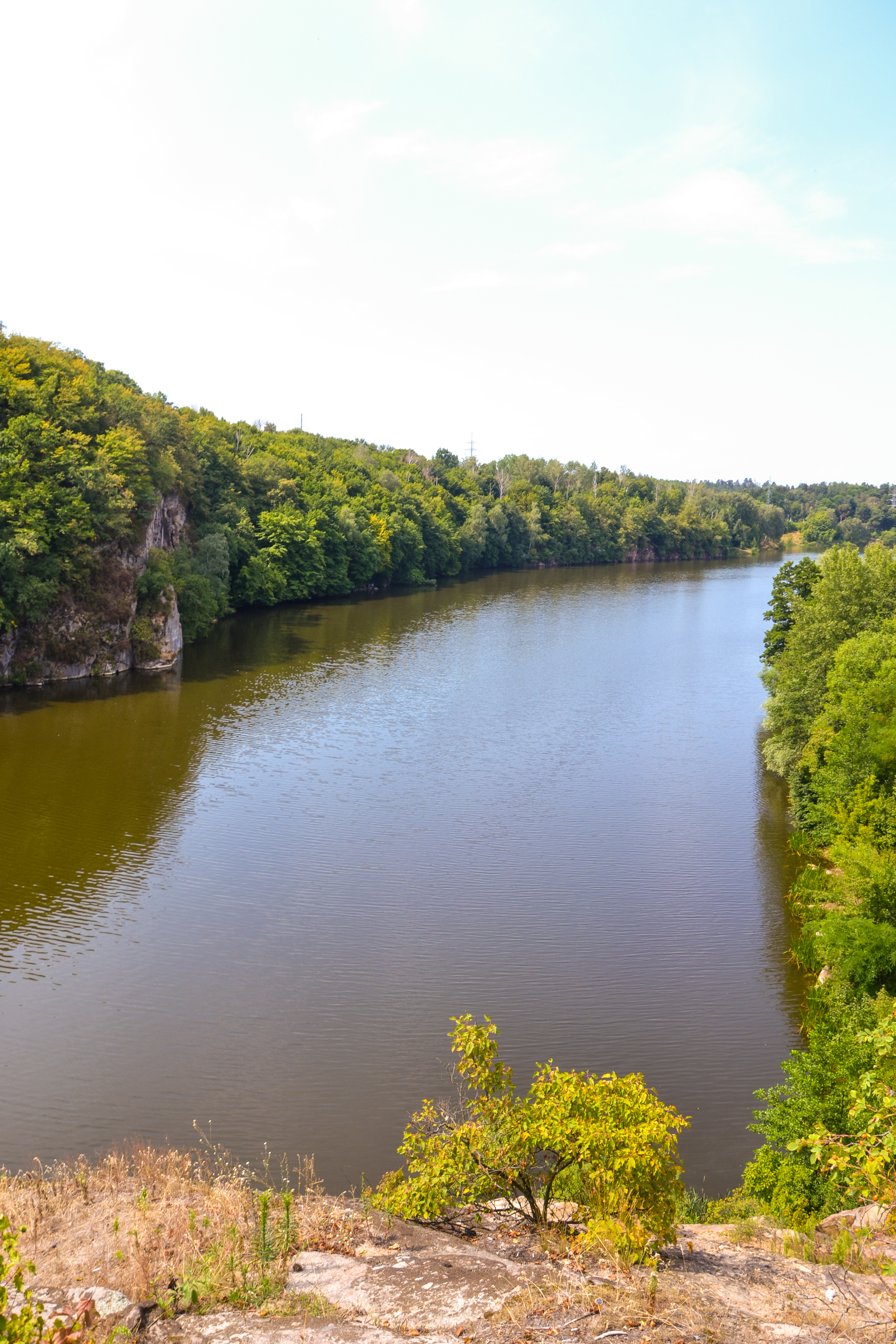
- Teteriv River near Zhytomyr
- Native name: Тетерiв (Ukrainian)

Location
- Country: Ukraine

Physical characteristics
- Source
  - location: Zhytomyr Oblast
- Mouth: Dnieper
  - location: Kyiv Reservoir
  - coordinates: 51°01′57″N 30°17′03″E
- Length: 385 km (239 mi)
- Basin size: 15,300 km^{2} (5,900 sq mi)
- Discharge
  - average: 18,4 m³/s

Basin features
- Progression: Dnieper→ Dnieper–Bug estuary→ Black Sea

The Teteriv (Ukrainian: Тетерiв) is a right tributary of the Dnieper River in Ukraine. It has a length of 365 kilometres (227 mi) and a drainage basin of 15,300 square kilometres (5,900 sq mi).

The Teteriv flows generally in northeastern direction through geographic regions of Podolian Upland, Dnieper Upland, and Polesia. The river starts near a populated place of Nosivky (previously Nosivka) near administrative border with Vinnytsia Oblast at 299 m (981 ft) over the sea level. Flowing through Podolian Upland in some areas it has characteristics of mountainous stream. In the underflow the valley of the Teteriv in Polissia on up to 4 kilometres (2.5 mi), the width of the river widens up to 40-90 meter, before it flows into the Dnieper. The midstream of Teteriv from Zhytomyr to Radomyshl has predominantly rocky banks. Few kilometers east of Radomyshl turns into fully flatland river within Kyiv Oblast. Further east of Ivankiv turns into a swampy wetland. The river drains into the Dnieper in the Kyiv Reservoir just south of the Prypiat river estuary and the Chernobyl exclusion zone.

The Teteriv is replenished predominantly by snow and rain. It usually freezes over from December to March.

Large cities located on the river are: Zhytomyr, the administrative center of the Zhytomyr Oblast, Korostyshiv, and Radomyshl.

Within Zhytomyr, in the beginning of 20th century on the right bank of the Teteriv was established a city park by local nobleman Baron de Shoduar, head of the Imperial Russian society in protection of animals. With establishment of the Soviet regime, the body of baron was thrown out of the family tomb. Later the park was named after Russian pilot Yuriy Gagarin.

== Tributaries ==
The important tributaries of the river are

- Left: Syvka, Ibr, Budychyna, Oleshka, Lisova, Perebehla, Hodynka, Shyika, Bobrivka, Kyzhynka, Chervonyi, Krutyi Yar, Perlivka, Pobytivka, Lisova Kamyanka, Kalynivka, Berezyna, Ruda, Levcha, Myka, Hlukhivka, Mezherichka, Myroch, Vyrva, Irsha, Ravka, Huche, Zamochek, Parnia, Kropyvnia, Zhereva, Liubsha, Bolotna, Terniava, Khocheva
- Right: Kobylykha, Teterivka, Chamyshel, Hremliaha, Tetynets, Hlybochok, Koshcha, Hnylopiat, Huiva, Rusiatynka, Dorohynka, Hnylyi Potik, Kokhanivka, Ivyanka, Krychanka, Velyki Lozy, Dubovets, Bilka, Kodra, Piskivka, Tal, Zdvyzh

== Gallery ==
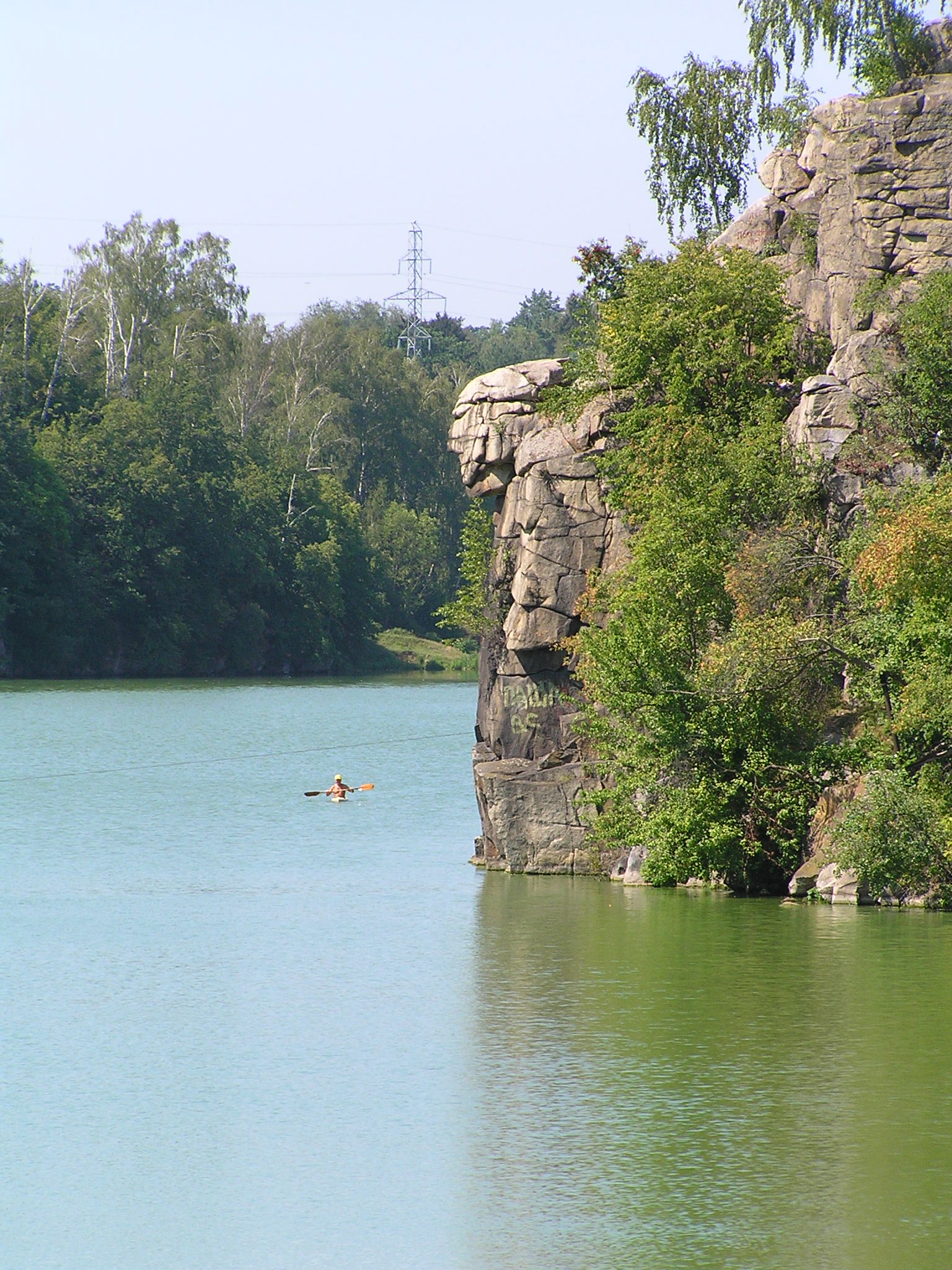
Rocky banks within Zhytomyr

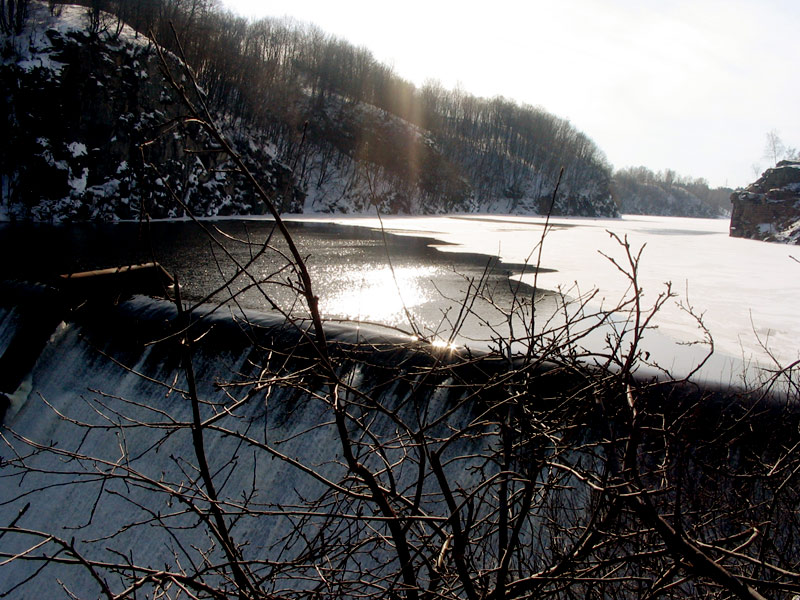
A river dam in Zhytomyr (early spring)

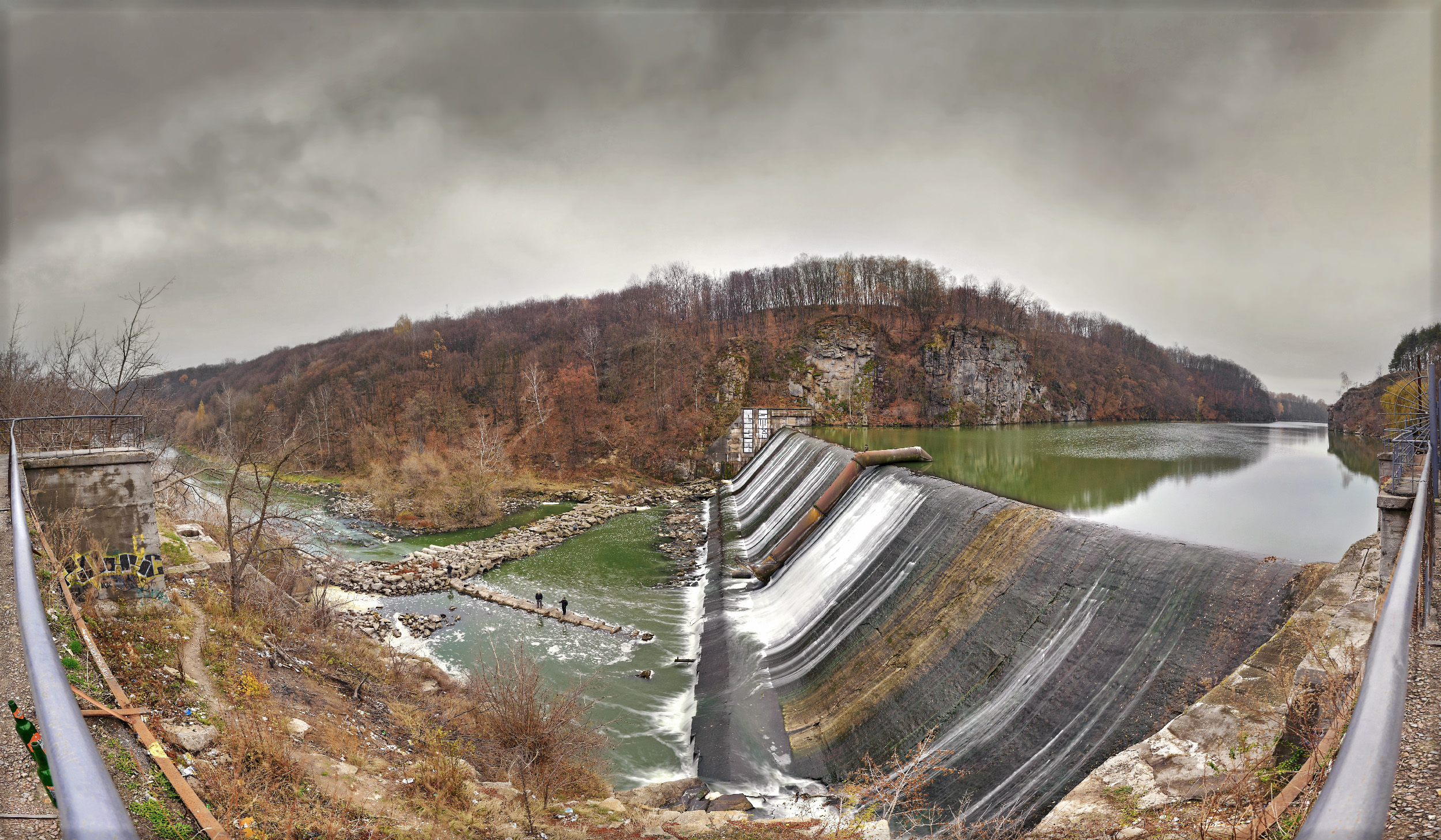
A river dam in Zhytomyr (in autumn)
