= Berdychiv Raion =

Subdivision of Zhytomyr Oblast, Ukraine

Berdychiv Raion Бердичівський район
- Raion
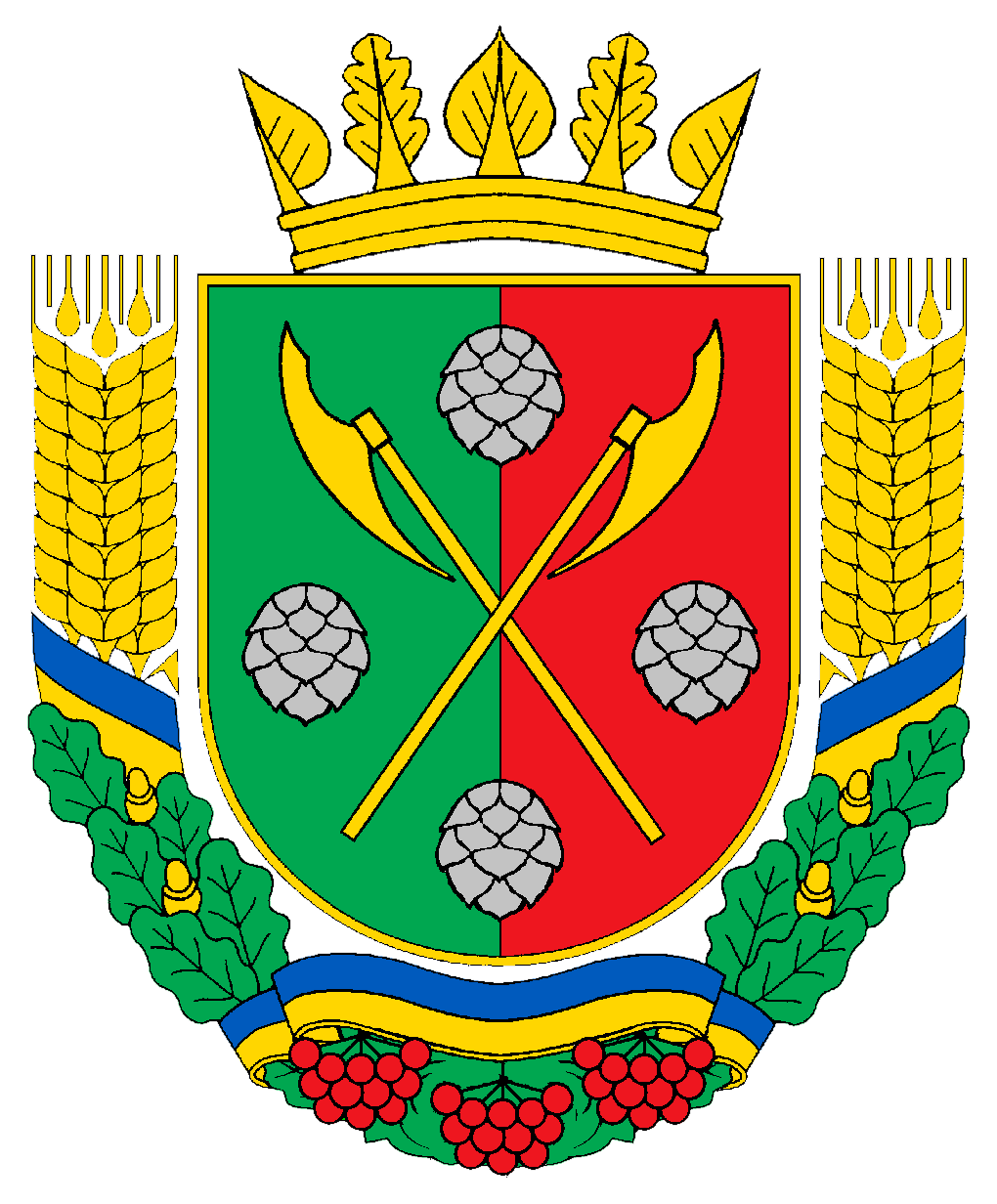
- Flag Coat of arms
- Interactive map of Berdychiv Raion
- Coordinates: 49°56′4″N 28°36′42″E
- Country: Ukraine
- Oblast: Zhytomyr Oblast
- Admin. center: Berdychiv
- Subdivisions: 10 hromadas

Area
  - Total: 3,018.5 km^{2} (1,165.4 sq mi)

Population (2022)
  - Total: 156,419
  - Density: 51.820/km^{2} (134.21/sq mi)
- Time zone: UTC+02:00 (EET)
  - Summer (DST): UTC+03:00 (EEST)
- Area code: +380

Berdychiv Raion (Ukrainian: Бердичівський район) is a raion (district) of Zhytomyr Oblast, northern Ukraine. Its administrative centre is located at Berdychiv. The raion is located in the southern part of the oblast; the distance between Zhytomyr and Berdychiv is 43 kilometres (27 mi). Population: 156,419 (2022 estimate).

On 18 July 2020, as part of the administrative reform of Ukraine, the number of raions of Zhytomyr Oblast was reduced to four, and the area of Berdychiv Raion was significantly expanded. Before the expansion, the area of the raion was 865.2 square kilometres (334.1 mi^{2}); after the expansion, the area of the raion is 3,018.5 square kilometres (1,165.4 mi^{2}). The January 2020 estimate of the raion population was 27,587 (2020 est.).

== Geography ==
Berdychiv district borders Zhytomyr district of Zhytomyr Oblast, Kyiv and Vinnytsia regions of Ukraine. The district is located on the Dnieper Upland, the highest point is 249 m above sea level. The territory of the district belongs to the forest-steppe zone, covered with hornbeam-oak forests and meadow steppes. The Teteriv and Ros rivers flow through the district (Dnieper basin).

Mineral resources of the district: kaolin, granite, brown coal. The climate of the Berdychiv district is moderately continental, with humid summers and mild winters. The average annual temperature is approximately 10 °C, the average temperature in January is 4-5 °C, and in July it is about +20 °C. The annual amount of precipitation is 570 mm.

Berdytsiv is a significant railway junction, through which the railway from Kozyatin-Zdolbuniv-Kovel passes. The European highway E583 to Zhytomyr and Vinnytsia passes through Berdytsiv.

== Notable landmarks ==
The natural reserve fund of the district consists of 9 regional-level reserves, Demchynsky and Raihorodsky parks of landscape art of local importance.

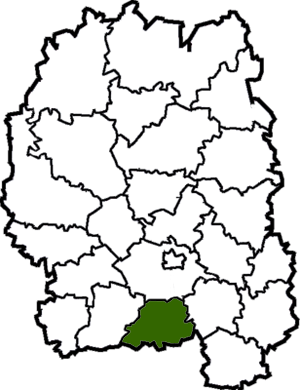
Berdychiv Raion in Zhytomyr Oblast (1966-2020)

== Notable people ==
- figure of the Polish national movement Edmund Różycki (vil. Ahativka)
- doctor of Economic I.Oliynyk
- opera singer G.Shapovalov (vil. Zhurbyntsi)
- rector of Zhytomyr pedagogical institute P. Gornostai (vil. Ivankivtsi)
- doctor of Biological S. Markevych (vil. Katerynivka)
- doctor of Philological P.Bilous
- Honored trainer of the USSR V.Lonskyi (vil. Obukhivka)
- poet M. Pasichnyk (vil. Polovetske)
- bibliographer and literary critic M.Gumenyuk (vil. Reia)
- the Doctor of engineering, general I. Oliynyk (vil. Skraglivka)
- doctor of Arts and Philosophy D. Stepovyk, (vil. Slobodshche)
- doctor of biological Ye. Kondratyuk (vil. Old Solotvyn)
- classic of English literature Joseph Conrad
- author, memorialist Stefan Borovskyi (s. Terekhove)
- corresponding member of Academy of Science of the USSR
- a physicist, Hero of the Soviet Union V. Mostovyi (s. Khazhyn)

== Bibliography ==
- Національний атлас України/НАН України, Інститут географії, Державна служба геодезії, картографії та кадастру; голов. ред. Л. Г. Руденко; голова ред. кол.Б.Є. Патон. — К.: ДНВП «Картографія», 2007. — 435 с. — 5 тис.прим. — ISBN 978-966-475-067-4.
