= Tereshchenko =

Tereshchenko (Ukrainian: Терещенко; Russian: Терещенко) is a surname of Ukrainian origin. It originates from the name Teresh (Ukrainian: Тереш) through an addition of the Ukrainian paternal suffix -enko.

== People ==
=== Tereshchenko family ===
The Tereshchenko family of the Russian Empire was a prominent dynasty of entrepreneurs, philanthropists and politicians of Ukrainian origin. In emigration their surname has at times been rendered as Terestchenko. Notable members include:

- Artemy Tereshchenko (1794–1873), entrepreneur, land-owner, pioneer of sugar production in the Russian Empire.
- Simon Tereshchenko (1839–1893), entrepreneur, son of Artemy.
- Varvara Khanenko (née Tereshchenko, 1848–1922), noted art collector alongside her husband Bogdan Khanenko. Their collection form the basis of today's Khanenko Museum in Kyiv.
- Ivan Tereshchenko (1854–1903), collector and patron of the arts.
- Mikhail Tereshchenko (1886–1956), minister of Foreign Affairs of the Russian Provisional Government, son of Ivan.

=== Others ===
- Alexei Tereshchenko (born 1980), Russian ice hockey player
- Dmytro Tereshchenko (born 1987), Ukrainian footballer
- Irina Tereshchenko (born 1947), Soviet movie actress
- Oles Tereshchenko (born 1975), Ukrainian journalist
- Oleh Tereshchenko (born 1972), Ukrainian football player
- Sergey Tereshchenko (1951–2023), Prime Minister of Kazakhstan
- Valery Tereshchenko (academic) (1901–1994), Russian−Soviet academic
- Valery Tereshchenko (diplomat) (born 1952), Russian diplomat and ambassador
- Vladyslav Tereshchenko (born 1972), Ukrainian sprint canoer
- Vyacheslav Tereschenko (born 1977), Ukrainian football player

== Others ==
- Tereshchenko Diamond, a 42.92-carat (8.584 g) blue diamond
