= Tereshchenko churches =

The Tereshchenko family of philanthropists, originally from Ukraine have donated to, and supported, the construction and restoration of Christian churches all over the world.

== History ==
Artemy Tereshchenko started the family dynasty in the early 1880s when he created businesses in producing and exporting sugar beet. By 1911 the family owned 10 large sugar refineries and 153,000 hectares of land. The family went on to support the arts and politics.

The funds donated by Tereshchenko family have helped to build and restore Orthodox church buildings including, the Cathedral of the Three Anastasias, Pokrovskaya church in Solomenka, Kyiv, St. Nicholas Cathedral in the Pokrovsky monastery, St Volodymyr's Cathedral, Beaulieu-sur-Mer, and Russian Orthodox churches in Cannes.

=== Cathedral of the Three Anastasias ===
The first earnings of the family were spent on the restoration of the old wooden Cathedral. The family took an active part in the building work.

The Church of the Three Anastasias was built in the early 18th century by Anastasia Skoropasky of the prominent Ukrainian Hetman family.

In 1846, Artemy Tereshchenko started funding the church, whereupon a normal service was resumed. In 1861 and 1872, the altar of the Cross and Resurrection and the altar of the St. Artemy were constructed. Artemy was the civil trustee of the cathedral, and since 1846 he engaged in maintenance and repair of the church.

Artemy planned that the most beautiful room of his house was put under the house church. After the final reconstruction of the church, an underground passage was dug that allowed the family to get from the house to the crypt of the church, which later equipped the Tereshchenko family's feretory shrine and charnel house. Artemy and Nikola Tereshchenko started the day at 4 a.m. with a prayer in the church.

In 1884, the Chernihiv provincial board approved a resolution on the new project of the cathedral, according to the planning of St. Petersburg Academician of Architecture Andrey Goun. The construction of the new church began a year later, in 1885 and funds were donated by Artemy's sons. The church was consecrated in 1893. The old church was demolished due to its state of disrepair and a new chapel was built on its site.

During the Revolution, the crypt was looted and the slabs of the graves were smashed.

During World War II the central dome of the temple was destroyed. At the end of the war it was rebuilt in a somewhat modified form.

The new chapel was destroyed by communists in 1950.

During the restoration and repair of the cathedral, the crosses which were manufactured from the drawings of Andrey Goun were replaced.

After 1991, the graves were re-consecrated and re-ordered.

In 2007, the cathedral was nominated by Hlukhiv on Ukrainian competition Seven Wonders of Ukraine. As a consequence, the church took the sixth place in the Sumy regional campaign 'Seven Wonders of the Sumy region'.

=== St. Nicholas Cathedral in the Pokrovsky monastery ===
St. Nicholas Cathedral - the largest temple in Kyiv by size - was built in 1896–1911. Duchess Alexandra Petrovna of Oldenburg funded the cathedral, allocating 3 thousand rubles every month. After her death construction was not conducted for nearly two years. The monastery asked for help from benefactors and a substantial contribution was made by the Tereshchenko family who collectively donated over 50 thousand rubles, including 20 thousand rubles set aside for future spending on the gilding domes and silver throne.

=== St Volodymyr's Cathedral ===
The Tereshchenko family took an active part in the building of this magnificent cathedral. Nikola Tereshchenko presented a plot of land that was located between his mansion and the home of Ivan Nikolovich. He also donated large funds for the gilding of all the bells of the temple; Elizabeth Tereshchenko invited the most famous artists from all over Russia for the painting of the church, as well as carrying out charitable activities and supporting the efforts of the ecclesiastics to facilitate the lives of the poor and disadvantaged of the parish.
