= Khanenko family =

- Coat of arms of Khanenko family
- Current region: Ukraine, Russia
- Origin: Cossack Hetmanate
- Members: Mykhailo Khanenko; Bohdan Khanenko; Varvara Khanenko
- Connected families: Tereshchenko family
- Distinctions: Hetman of Ukraine; Colonel; General khorunzhy Marshal of the Nobility

Khanenko family (Ukrainian: Ханенки) first became prominent as members of the Cossack starshyna in the Hetmanate. During the 19th and 20th centuries the family's representatives attained fame as important cultural figures in Ukraine.

== History ==
The family descended from Stepan Khanenko, a Zaporozhian Cossack. His son Mykhailo took part in the Khmelnytsky Uprising and in 1656 was appointed colonel of Uman, before eventually rising to become hetman of Right-bank Ukraine as a contestant of Petro Doroshenko. In 1674 Mykhailo moved to Left-bank Ukraine. Stepan's grandchildren Fedir and Danylo would serve as officials in the Cossack regiments of Kyiv and Lubny.

Danylo's son Mykola, a grand cousin of Mykhailo Khanenko, was an important politician and diplomat of the Hetmanate and became known for his memoirs. Mykola's sons Vasyl and Ivan served as officers under Peter III and Rumyantsev, becoming major landowners in the Russian Empire. Ivan's son Alexander received a good education and worked as a foreign affairs councelor under Alexander Bezborodko, being active in Ukrainian autonomist circles. After 1800 Alexander worked at the Russian embassy in London, and upon his return systematized the family's archive. His nephew Mykhailo authored articles on economy and published part of the documents from the family archive in Chernihiv. Mykhailo also co-operated with Osyp Bodiansky, providing him with materials on Ukrainian history. Two of Mykhailo's brothers Alexander and Ivan also created works on historical topics.

Ivan 's son Bohdan became known as an art collectioner, archaeologist and philanthropist. During the late 19th century Khanenko family was active in the sugar industry, and in 1897 its members were among the founders of the All-Russian Union of Sugar Producers in Kyiv. The family's archive, until 1918 stored in Gorodishche, was in 1926 transported to Homiel, and later to Kyiv, where it remains to this day.

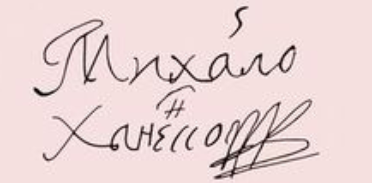
Mykhailo Khanenko's signature, 17th century

== Family tree ==
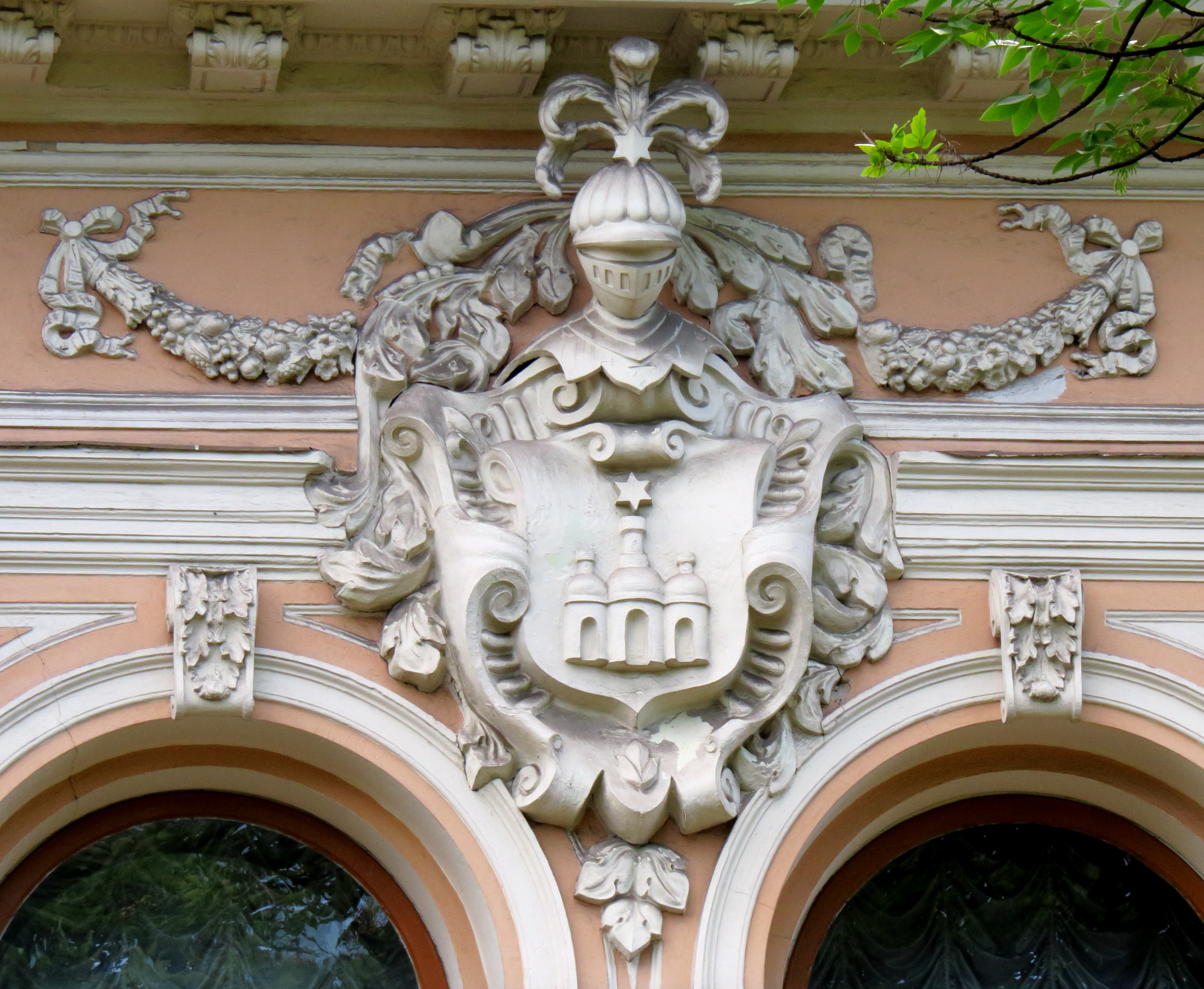
Emblem of the Khanenko family on the eponymous museum in Kyiv

- Stepan (early 17th century, lived in Zaporozhia);
  - Mykhailo (c.1620-1680), Hetman of Right-bank Ukraine (1669-1674);
  - Lavrentiy, brother of Mykhailo;
    - Fedir (died 1744), obozny (train commander) of Kyiv Regiment;
    - Danylo (died 1695), appointed colonel of Lubny, died fighting the Tatars at Gazikerman; married to daughter of general obozny I. Lomykovsky;
      - Mykola (1693-1760), studied at Kyiv Academy and in Lviv, later in diplomatic service of hetmans Ivan Skoropadsky and Pavlo Polubotok; imprisoned at Peter and Paul Fortress after presenting Polubotok's petition in Saint Petersburg; after his liberation served in official positions of Starodub Regiment, after the Russo-Turkish War promoted to General khorunzhy; on this position took part in the codification of Ukrainian law and served in the General Military Chancellery of hetman Kyrylo Rozumovsky;
        - Petro, died in infancy;
        - Vasyl (c.1730-late 18th or early 19th century), studied in Hlukhiv, Saint Petersburg and Kiel, in 1752-1762 commanded the Holstein Corps and served as aide-de-camp of Emperor Peter III; after retirement settled in the village of Lotaky near Starodub, which was awarded to him by hetman Rozumovsky;
        - Ivan (1743-c.1797), studied in Saint Petersburg, took part in the war against the Ottomans, later served as aide-de-camp of count Rumyantsev; after retirement, in 1783 elected Marshal of the Nobility in Pogar, later returned to serve in Hlukhiv carabinier regiment; married to Sofia Horlenko, great-granddaughter of hetman Danylo Apostol;
          - Alexander (c.1776-1830), knew French, English and German languages, from 1799 worked at the Collegium of Foreign Affairs in the rank of court councillor under protection of prince Bezborodko; during the 1780s was active in Ukrainian autonomist circles, from 1800 worked as secretary of the Russian embassy in London; later settled in his possessions in Surazh Uyezd and served as the local Marhsal of Nobility;
          - Mykola, son of Ivan;
          - Kateryna, daughter of Ivan;
          - Ivan, brother of Alexander;
            - Alexander (1816-1895), historian, civic and cultural activist, during the 1840s served as Marshal of the Nobility in Surazh, took part in the implementation of the Emancipation reform of 1861 in Chernigov Governorate, collected historically valuable books and published a number of works on local and family history;
            - Ivan (1817-1891), published materials on Surazh Uyezd and other works;
              - Bohdan (1849-1917), collectioner of arts, archaologist, philanthropist, founder of the Khanenko Museum, member of the State Council, married to Varvara (née Tereshchenko);
            - Mykhailo (1818-1852), during the 1840s served as Marhsal of the Nobility in Novhorod-Siverskyi, known for his works on history and economy.

== Gallery ==
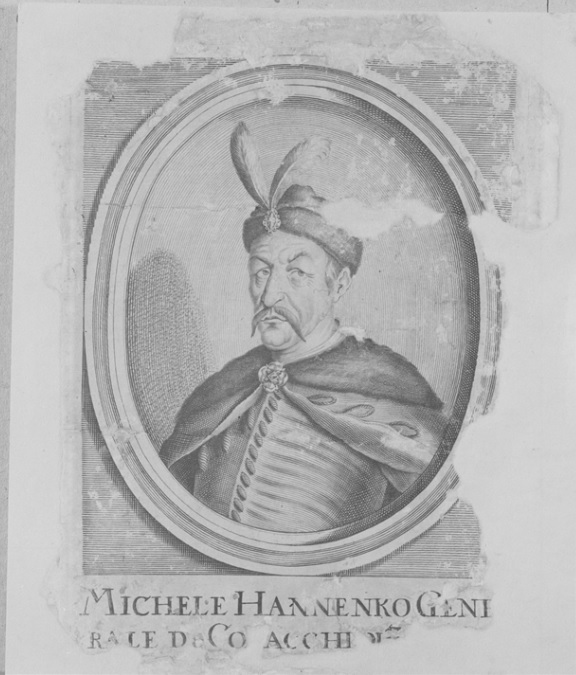
Portrait of Mykhailo Khanenko, 17th century

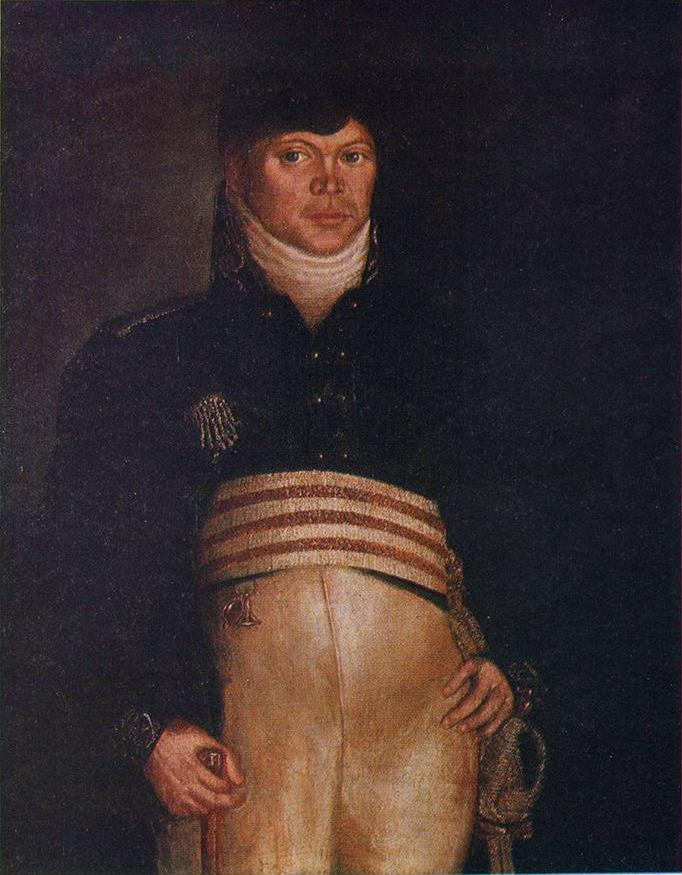
Portrait of Mykola (Nikolay), son of Ivan Khanenko (1809)

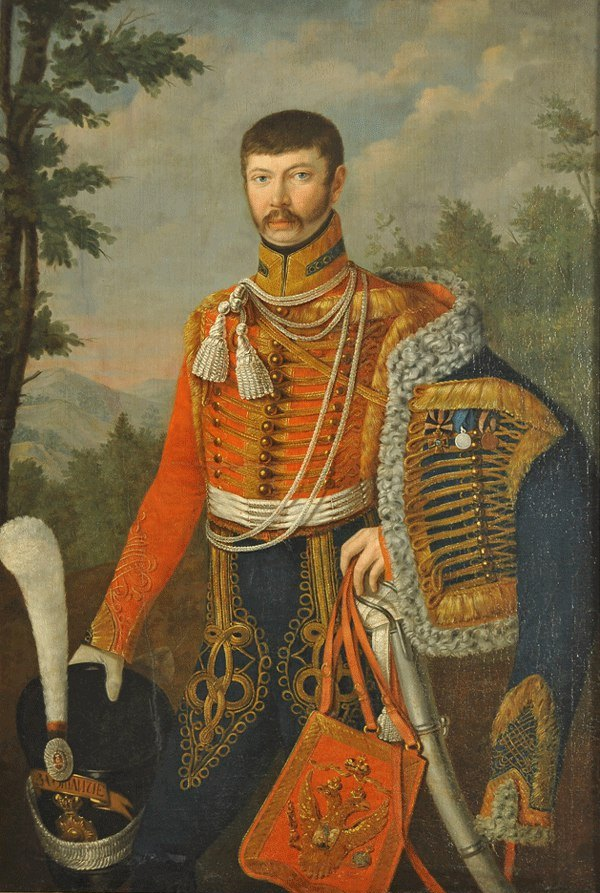
Portrait of Ivan, son of Ivan Khanenko (1816)

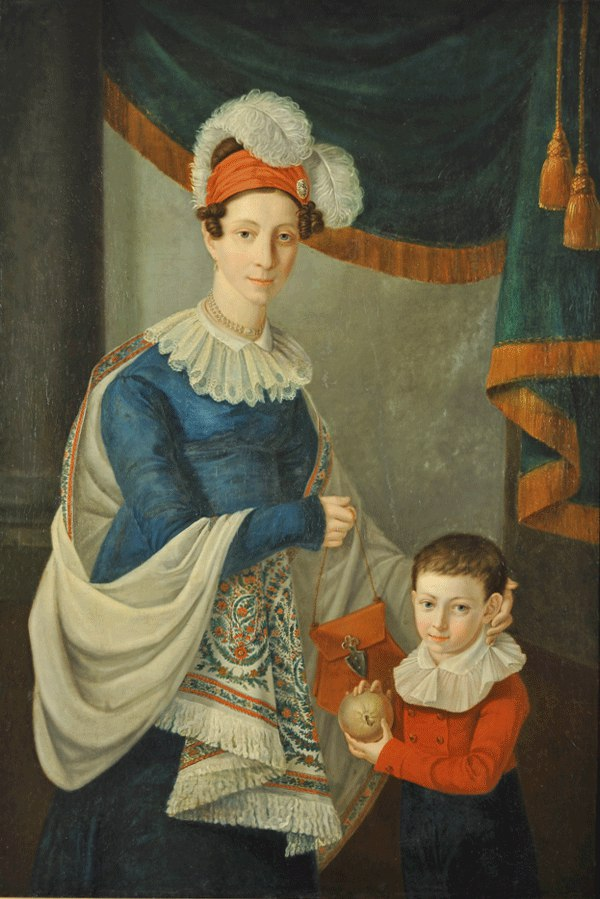
Portrait of Kateryna (Ekaterina) Khanenko, 1821

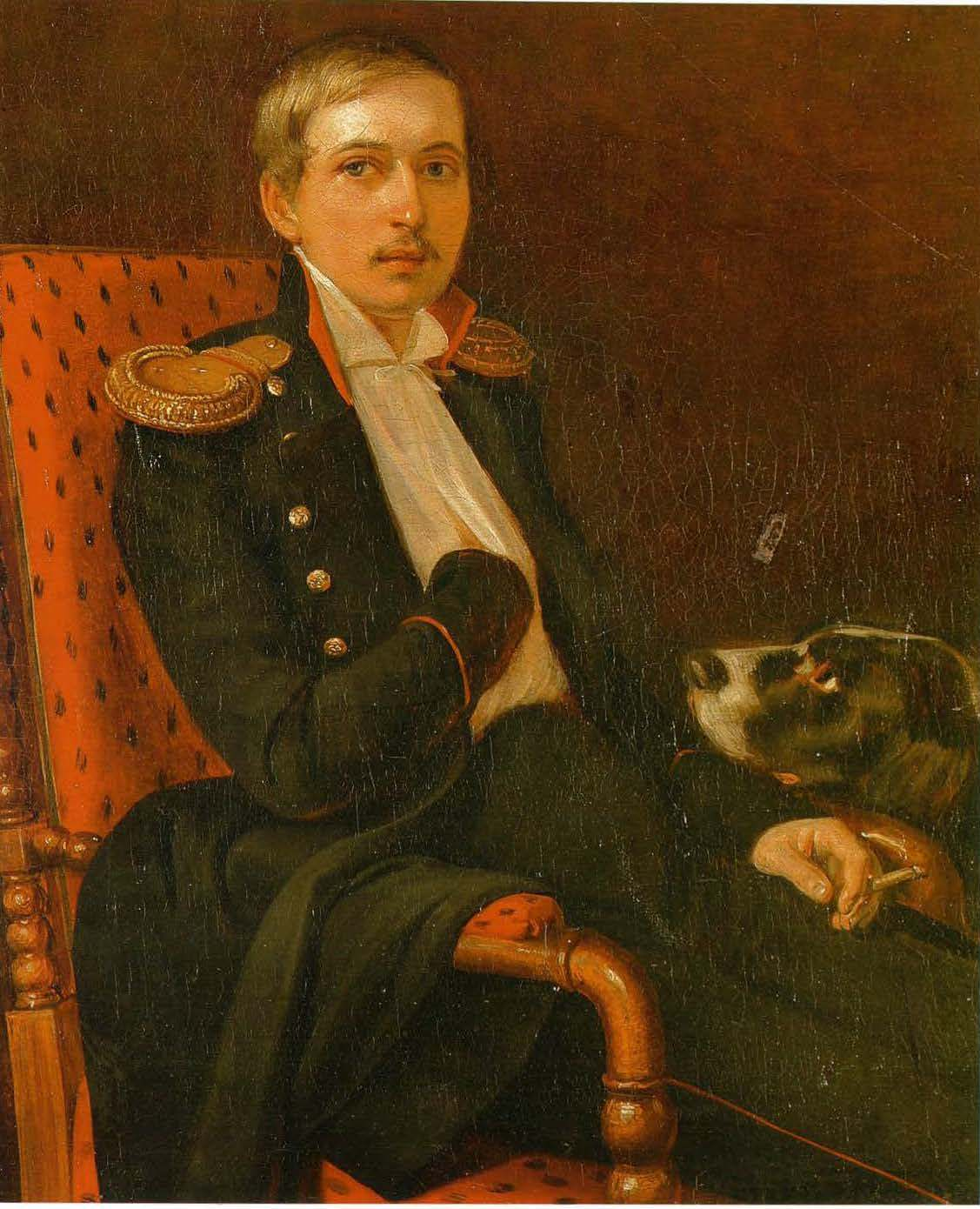
A 1841 portrait of Ivan Khanenko (1817-1891)

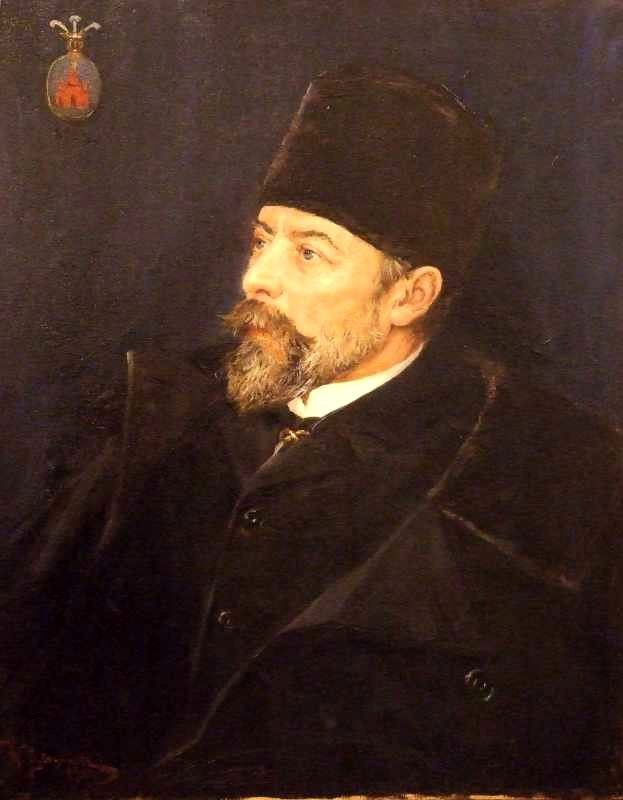
Portrait of Bohdan Khanenko (1904)

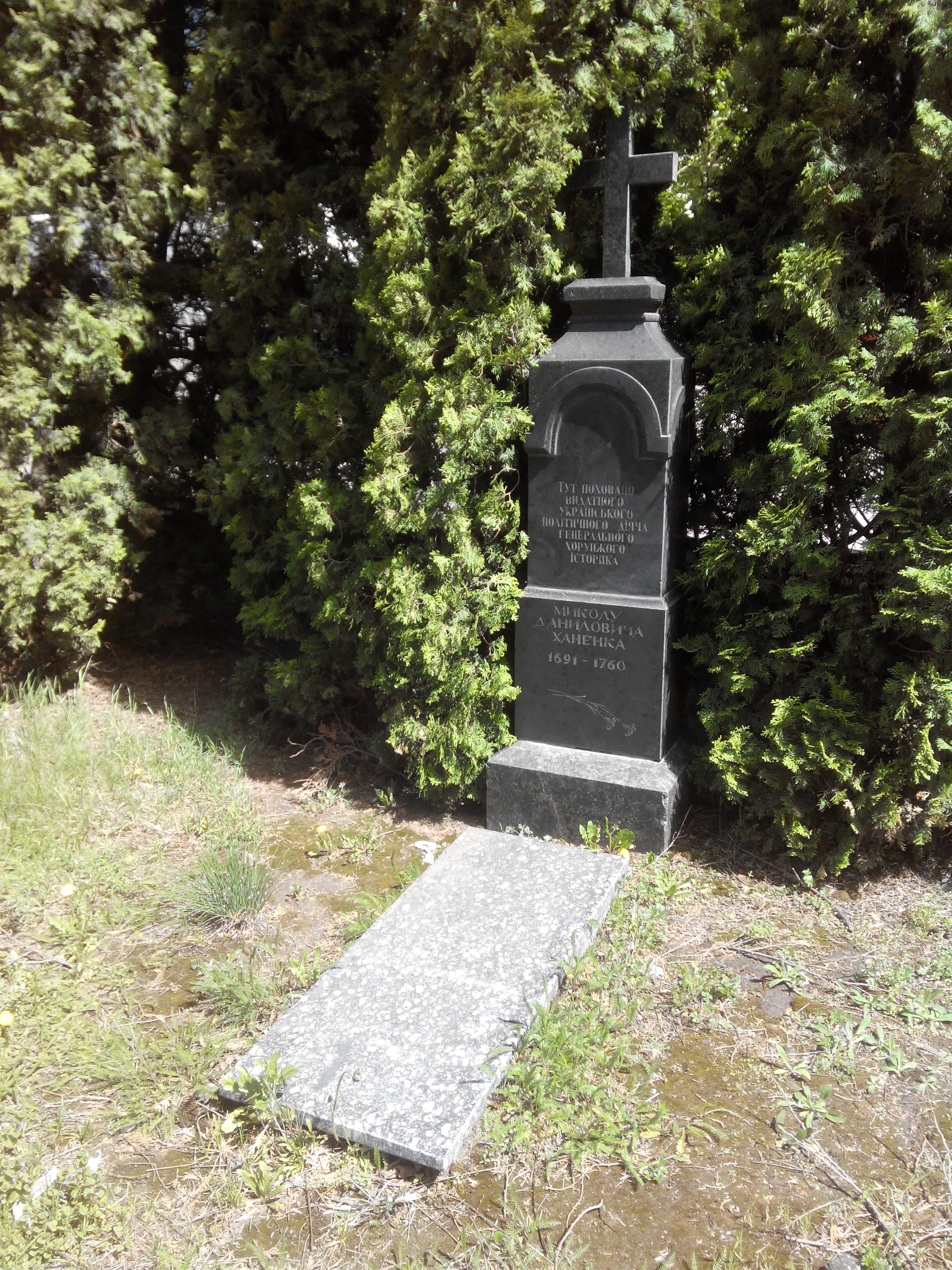
Grave of Mykola Khanenko (died 1760) in Hlukhiv

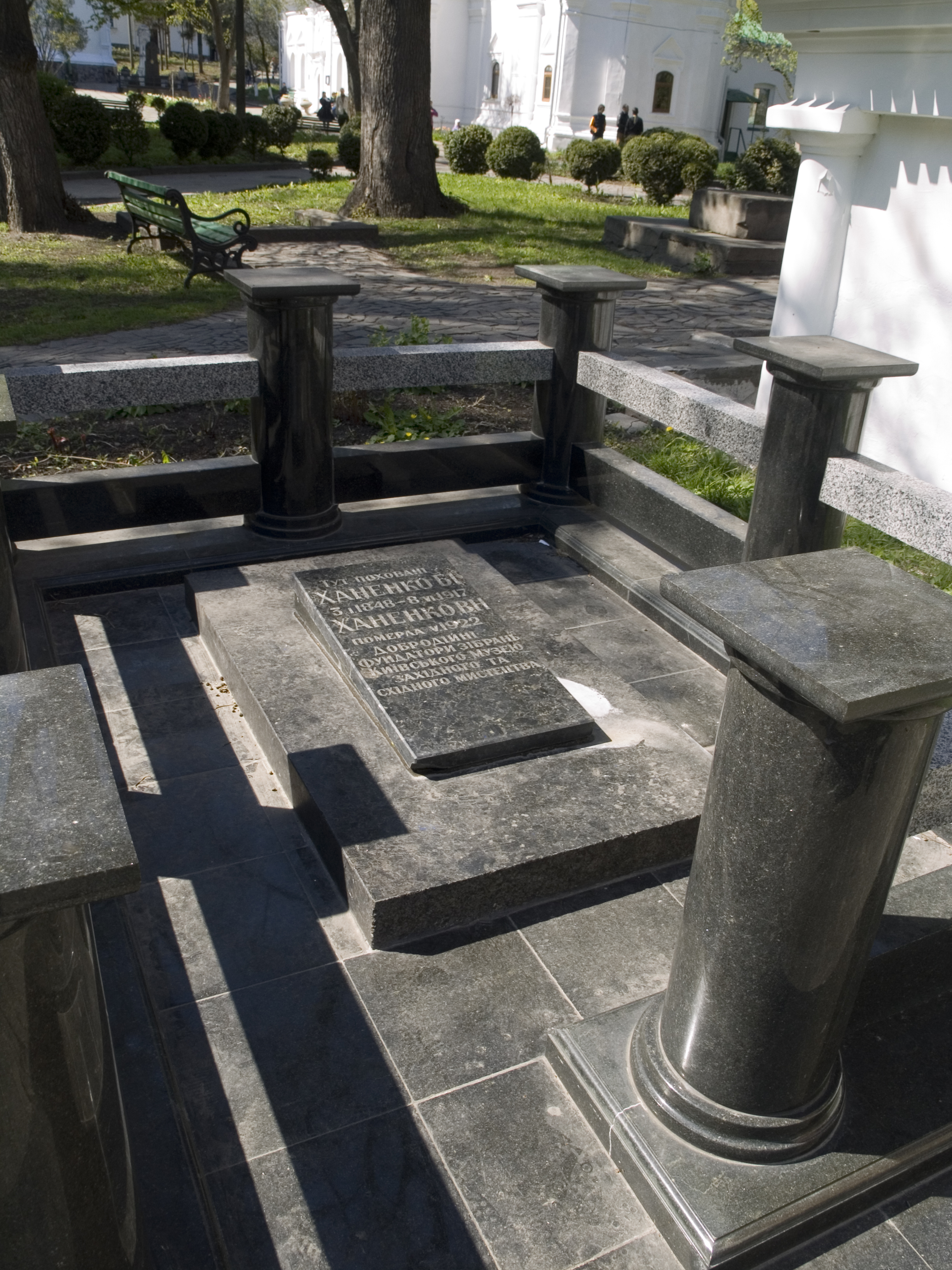
Grave of Bohdan Khanenko and his wife Varvara in Vydubychi Monastery

== Sources ==
- Encyclopedia of Ukraine
