= Fedir Fedorovych Tereshchenko =

Ukrainian aircraft designer (1888–1950)

- Федір Федорович Терещенко
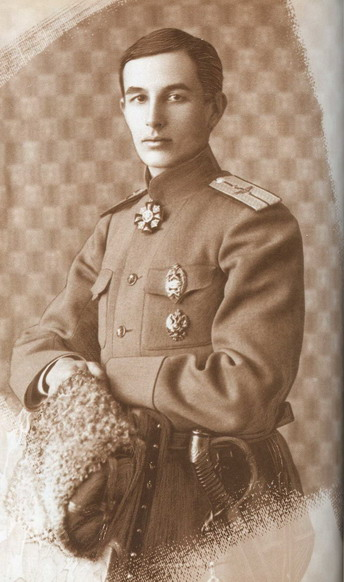
- Tereshchenko, c. 1915
- Born: November 11, 1888; Kyiv, Kyiv Governorate, Russian Empire
- Died: January 30, 1950 (aged 61); Paris, French Republic
- Education: Kyiv Polytechnic Institute
- Occupation: Aircraft designer

Fedir Fedorovych Tereshchenko (also transliterated as Fyodor Fyodorovich Tereshchenko; Ukrainian: Федір Федорович Терещенко; 11 November 1888 - 30 January 1950) was a Ukrainian aircraft designer and industralist. A member of the prominent Tereshchenko family of sugar magnates, he became one of the leading figures of the Kyiv's early aviation movement, serving as a founding member and major sponsor of the Kyiv Society of Aeronautics (KTP). At his estate in Chervone, he also established one of the first aviation workshops on the territory of modern-day Ukraine.

Tereshchenko initially studied within the mechanical department of the Kyiv Polytechnic Institute, where he became active within the early aeronautical circles of the institute and helped established the KTP in 1909. That same year, he purchased a Blériot XI and began to fly independently, which led him to construct his first monoplane, which he presented at the 12th All‑Russian Congress of Aeronauts and Physicians. In 1910, he developed his Chervone estate into an aviation workshop that produced several early designs of monoplanes and supplied aircraft to the Imperial Russian Army. During the First World War, he expanded his workshop into a small factory, and later headed a mobile aviation workshop in Moscow. After the Russian Revolution, Tereshchenko's property was nationalized and his aviation enterprise collapsed, which led him to emigrate to France. For the rest of his life, he lived in relative obscurity until his death on 30 January 1950.

== Early life ==
Tereshchenko was born on 11 November 1888 in Kyiv, which at the time of his birth was part of the Kyiv Governorate in the Russian Empire. He was the son of Fedir Tereshchenko Sr. and his second wife, Nadezhda Volodymyrivna, and was thus born into the Tereshchenko family who grew famous for their work in commerce and the sugar industry and became well-known philanthropists in Ukraine. In 1907, he graduated from the 1st Kyiv Gymnasium as an external student. After graduating, he entered the mechanical department of the Kyiv Polytechnic Institute, straying away from his family's tradition of commerce.

== Early aviation work ==
Soon after entering the school, he became active in the newly-formed Student Aeronautical Circle, which was experiencing its most productive year as the circle held 22 meetings between March and December 1909. He became one of the student presenters for the general assemblies of the circle, and in one titled "Exhibition in Paris", he discussed the First International Aviation Exhibition that had opened at the Grand Palais in Paris. In October 1909, he became one of the founding members of the Kyiv Society of Aeronautics (KTP), whose charter was approved in late 1909. During the society's first operational year, he advanced from a candidate member of the KTP Council to a full member of both the Scientific-Technical and Sports Committees. He served as one of the organization's principal financial sponsors due to the wealth his family had amassed in the sugar field, and he regularly paid rent for the KTP and provided funding for aviation inventions in the Russian Empire.

By late 1909, his first aeroplane was built and displayed at the 12th All-Russian Congress of Aeronauts and Physicians in Moscow, where he delivered a presentation about the aircraft with blueprints explaining that the monoplane design was the most convient, and was modeled after Louis Blériot's designs. The idea of the aeroplane came from a proposal by Nikolay Zhukovsky, who invited Tereschenko to participate in the upcoming aeronatuical exhibition in Moscow. His monoplane weighted 230 kg, including a pilot and a 25-30 horsepower Anzani engine system, and had a supporting surface area of 12m^2.

== Chervone workshop and WW1 ==
In 1910, he established "Aviation Workshops" at his personal estate in Chervone, within the Volhynia Province. The workshop housed various monoplanes and aeroplanes, spare parts, and engines from abroad including Anzanis and Mercedes, which totaled approximately 12,000 rubles in value, and also he built an aerodrome. Some have called it the first aviation enterprise in Ukraine. In July 1910, Tereschenko performed his first independent flights on his Blériot-type airplane (which is what it was called by the press, even though it was a monoplane of his own design), in the nearby village of Krasovka, located 13 km from Chervone, where he flew 6 times a distance of 2 versts in a straight line, and made turns in the air at a height of 12 m. By 2 August, he passed he exam for the pilot of pilot-aviator at the KTT, and thus received a pilot's certificate. Together with Volodymyr Grigoryev, he built light sports monopoles called G-2 and G-3, and then the monoplane "Tereschenko No. 3" which was featured in Kyiv Aviation Week. In January 1912, having wanted to devote himself to aircraft construction and citing family circumstances, he finally withdrew from KPI.

By September 1912, he was elected vice-chairman of the Kyiv Society of Aeronautics, and in March 1914, the Imperial All-Russian Aero Club issued an international pilot-aviator diploma to him. In 1913 he was contacted by representatives from St. Petersburg, and he signed contracts with the military department to build aeroplanes on order from the military ministry. He also hired one of the first female pilots in the Russian Empire, Lyubov Golanchikova, during this time. On 31 January 1914, the Ministry of Trade and Industry issued a certificate, No. 61829, to him that granted privileges for a flexible wing design for aeroplanes. This invention represented an advancement in aviation because it allowed pilots to regulate the speed of an aircraft during flight within wide limits without changing the angle of flight itself. This enabled simultaneous adjustment of both the angle of attack and the curvature of the wings for military aviation. By this point, the Chervone workshop was not only producing his own designs but improving foreign systems like the Farman and Morane-Saulnier models, leading the main military-technical directorate of the general staff to design one such improved model as the "Morane-Saulnier Parasol" of Tereschenko's system. The design bureau specifically placed an order for the "Tereschenko" system model for one pilot and commander at a cost of 8,500 rubles, and by the summer of 1913 the workshop was producing up to five aircraft per months with contracts worth tens of thousands of rubles. He was also given orders for a substantial amount of Farman-22 aeroplanes and an additional 25 "Morane-Saulnier Parasol" system aeroplanes and 25 sets of spare parts. By the eve of World War I, he was testing a new single-seat monoplane called "Tereschenko-6" using the Le Rhône engine, which was able to climb 500 m in 3.5 minutes and was designed for 5 hours of continuous flight.

However, upon the outbreak of World War I, the German government blocked special materials ordered from France that were being transported through German territory, and so Tereschenko could never fully complete his orders. Thus, he was forced to produce more of his "Tereschenko" type monoplanes in order to not rely on foreign French parts. However, the situation worsened in late 1914, and so he was forced to evacuate the workshop in Chervone. He initially planned to relocate the workshop to Kyiv and transform it into a factory producing 150 aircraft annually, but the threat of Kyiv's occupation forced another change and so in August 1915 he sent all his equipment to Moscow. A small factory was established as the workshop on the site of the Khodynka Aerodrome attached to the active army. The workshop still achieved some level of productivity even without adequate facilities, assembling around 20 aircraft per month on average, plus manufacturing small parts for the war like machine gun mounts and bomb throwers. At the same time, Tereschenko began stressed by the aviation business under wartime conditions, especially due to the new location in Moscow, and so he sold the factory in Moscow to JSC Dux, which was operated by Henri Farman's firm. Nevertheless, he still remained involved in aviation as in the autumn of 1916 he introduced a new design called "Tereschenko-7" which was produced in the Kyiv Polytechnic Institute workshop, a two-person aeroplane capable of 150 km per hour.

== Move to France and death ==
After the Russian Revolution, and the nobility lost their power, Tereshchenko's assets and property were nationalized. The aviation industry, too, suffered a collapse that was only accelerated by the October Revolution, with many choosing to emigrate in the aviation field. Little is known of what happened to Tereshchenko after this point. Some publications have stated that he died during the civil war. However, after research was done by Kyiv historian Vitalii Kovalynskyi in the start of the 21st century, it was established that he emigrated to France, and lived in Paris until he died. In the interview with his descendant Michel Tereshchenko, he revealed to Kovalynskyi that Tereschenko had struggled significantly in France, as he was unable to establish an aviation workshop and was forced to work as a newspaper kiosk vendor. While in Paris, he abandoned his aviation profession and instead became interested and music (he performed piano concerts and conducted a symphony orchestra) and the occultism before his death on 30 January 1950.

== Personal life ==
In 1909, he married Beatrice von Keyserling, who was the sister of Archibald Gebhardovich Keyserling, an admiral in the Latvian Naval Forces. The couple had one daughter in 1910 named Natalya. In 1916, Beatrice left Tereshchenko to marry Cornet Nikolai Vorontsov‑Vel’yaminov, a cavalry officer of junior rank, after she accused Fedir of infidelity.

== Legacy ==
On 19 February 2016, the Mayor of Zhytomyr, Serhii Sukhomlyn, signed an order that renamed "Koshevoy lane" into "Fedir Tereshchenko Lane" in accordance with the law on decommunization.
