= Bogdan Khanenko =

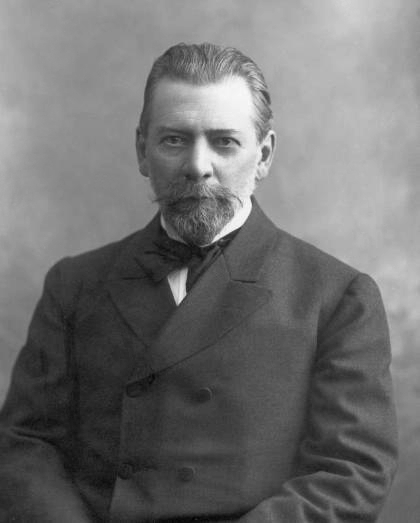
Bohdan Khanenko. 1912.

Bohdan Khanenko (Ukrainian: Богдáн Івáнович Ханéнко; Russian: Богда́н Ива́нович Хане́нко; 1849, Surazhsky Uyezd – 1917, Kiev) was a Ukrainian lawyer, sugar industrialist, and art collector. He belonged to the well known Khanenko family, which included such personalities as Mykhailo Khanenko and Danylo Khanenko. Along with his wife Varvara, Bohdan Khanenko was known for his philanthropic activities towards art and its preservation in Ukraine and the Russian Empire.

== Biography ==
Khanenko was born on 23 January 1849 in the village of Lotoky, which was then part of the Chernigov Governorate in the Russian Empire at the time of his birth. He was born on the grounds of the large estate granted to the Khanenko family by Hetman Kirill Razumovsky. He was the son of Collegiate Secretary Ivan Ivanovych Khaneko and Ekaterina Nilus. Through his paternal side, he was from the Khanenko family, a family of Cossack origin which includes such personalities like Mykhailo Khanenko and Danylo Khanenko. On his mother's side, he belonged to the Russian-German von Nilus family.

He first graduated from the 1st Moscow Gymnasium, before in 1871 graduated from the Department of Law of Moscow University. After graduating, in 1873, he moved to St. Petersburg to work within the Department of Justice serving as a Justice of the Peace. However, he moved not too long later in 1876 when he was appointed a member of the Warsaw District Court. By the end of 1880, he retired and settled in Kyiv, marrying Varvara Tereshchenko, daughter of sugar industrialist Nikola Tereshchenko.

Khanenko was a famous patron of the arts, and during his forty-year collection activity he purchased works from art auctions in Vienna, Berlin, Paris, and Madrid. His most valuable purchases resulted from his trips to Italy, where he obtained approximately 100 pieces through auctions in Rome and Florence, and with the assistance of Alexander Rizzoni, a Russian-born painter living in Rome. He built a Museum of Western and Oriental Art with his unique and private foreign art collection. After his death, the museum opened up to the public and was named after the couple.

In 1906 Bohdan Khanenko was elected to the State Council of Imperial Russia.

After his death Varvara Khanenko was evicted from the family's house by the Soviets and had to live for the last months of her life in the house of their maidservant Dunyasha.

== See also ==
- Khanenko Museum
