= Alexander Rizzoni =

Russian painter

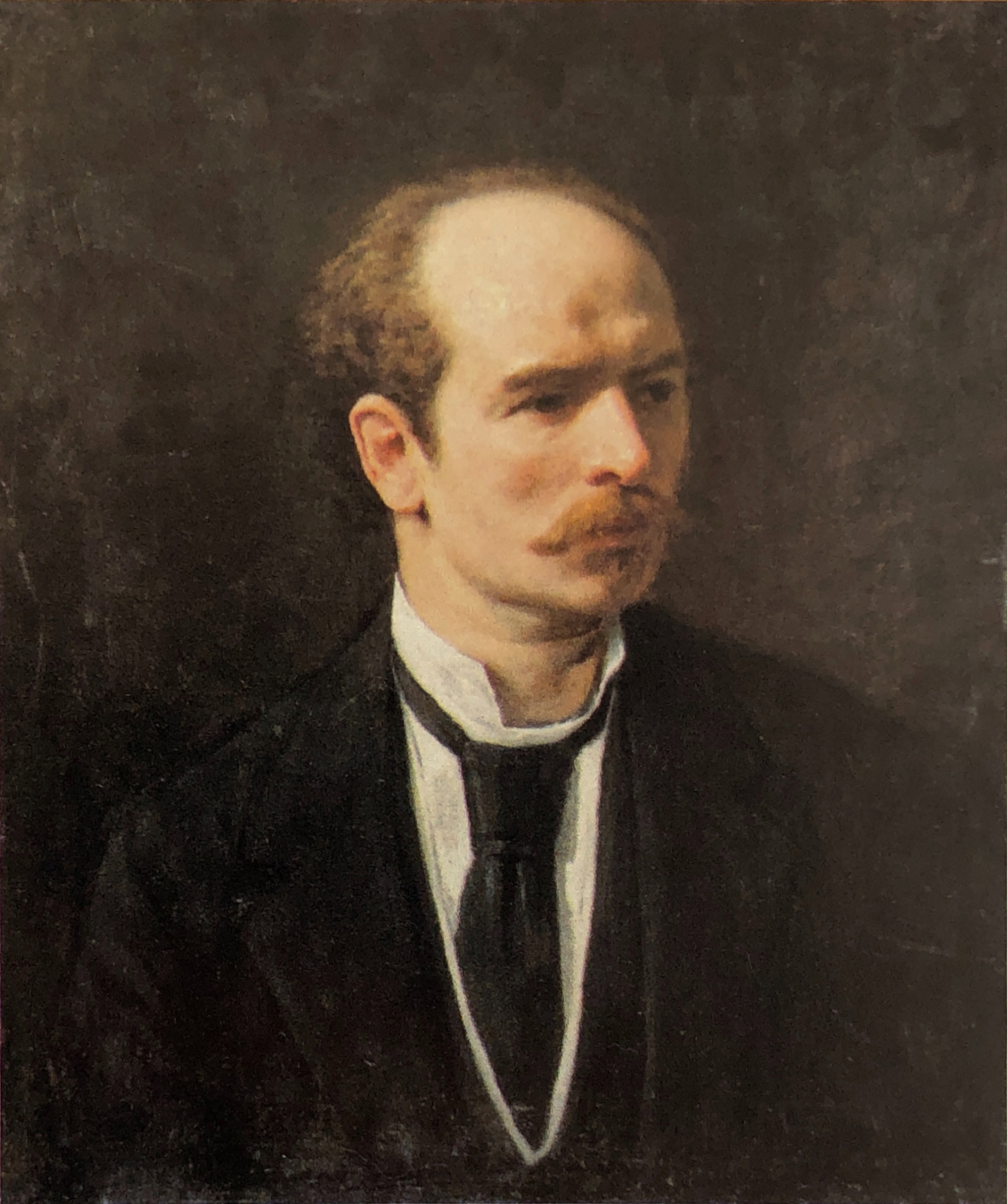
- Portrait by Mikhail Botkin, 1878, oils; Russian Museum
- Born: February 4, 1836; Riga, Governorate of Livonia, Russian Empire
- Died: April 29, 1902 (aged 66); Rome, Kingdom of Italy
- Resting place: Protestant Cemetery, Rome
- Education: Pavel Rizzoni; Bogdan Willewalde
- Alma mater: Imperial Academy of Arts
- Known for: Painting
- Awards: Big Gold Medal of the Imperial Academy of Arts (1861)
- Elected: Member Academy of Arts (1866); Professor by rank (1868)

Alexander Antonovich Rizzoni, or Alessandro Rizzoni (Russian: Алекса́ндр Анто́нович Риццо́ни; 4 February 1836, in Riga – 29 April 1902, in Rome) was a Russian-Italian painter of portraits and genre scenes; mostly on Catholic themes.

== Biography ==
He was born to an Italian family of artisans; originally from Bologna. He received his first lessons from his brother Pavel, who was also a genre painter. In 1852, he enrolled at the Imperial Academy of Arts, where he studied with Bogdan Willewalde. Five years later, he was awarded two silver medals for his work.

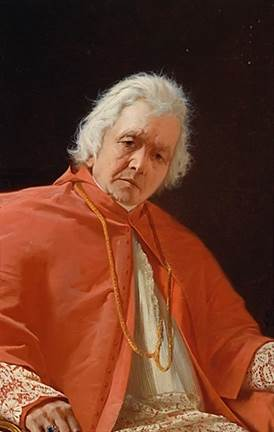
Portrait of a Cardinal

That same year, he made a study trip to Italy and France, at his own expense. When he returned in 1860, he received a gold medal for his painting "Jewish Smugglers", which might now be perceived as somewhat Anti-Semitic although, judging by his later works, he harbored no such sentiment.

After that, he travelled again, to Spain and Belgium and, when he returned in 1862, received another gold medal along with a stipend that allowed him to continue his studies abroad.

He spent four years in Paris and Rome, where he painted portraits of the Catholic clergy, scenes from folk life, and interiors of church buildings and synagogues. In 1866, he showed eight of these paintings in Saint Petersburg, earning the title of Imperial Academician and an extension of his stipend. Two years later, for similar pictures, he was elected an Impeial Professor.

When his stipend expired, he chose to stay in Rome, but continued to exhibit in Saint Petersburg. He also helped acquire paintings for the Tretyakov Gallery and the collector Bogdan Khanenko. From this point on, his works dealt almost exclusively with the Catholic Church; plus some portraits of young women.

His paintings are notable for their attention to details in the environment and costume, but are considered somewhat sentimental. In fact, the Russian critics never seriously cared for Rizzoni, given his foreign background, except for the Miriskussniki who, at the turn of the centuries, came to denounce Rizzoni as the "worst of all modern artists", with his work deemed unworthy to be present anywhere; whether Rizzoni was aware of that criticism or not is, however, unknown. Ultimately, he shot himself to death in May 1902, aged sixty-six; whereas the Soviet and Post-Soviet scholars claim but never prove the suicide to come out of the aforementioned criticism, the reports in Novoye Vremya say that in fact, Rizzoni made his choice as his rheumatism progressively worsened. Since Rizzoni could not be buried according to Catholic rites, it's been arranged for him to be interred into the Protestant Cemetery, Testaccio, per Orthodox rites.

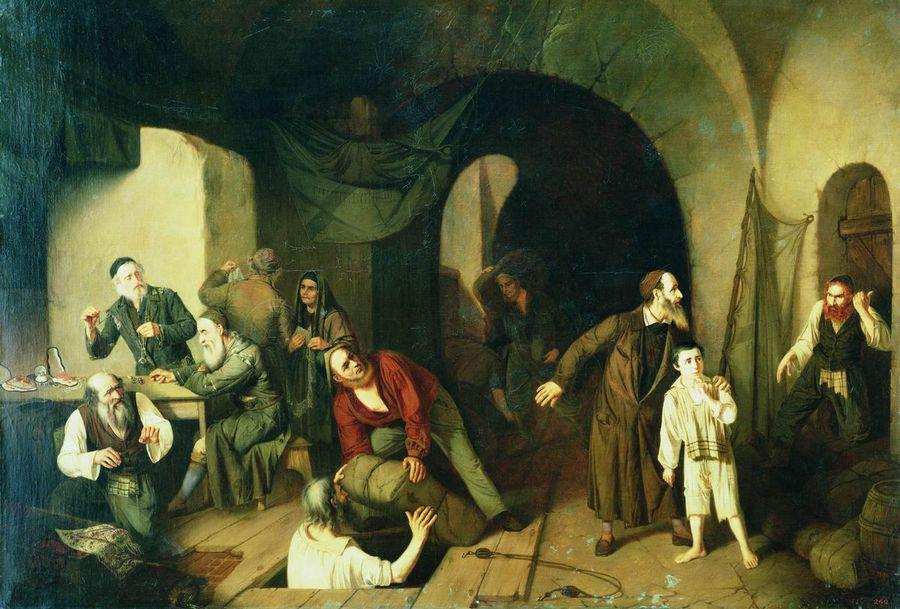
Jewish Smugglers

In 1990, one of his paintings, "The Italian Shop", was among a dozen stolen from the Serpukhov Historical and Art Museum. It was recovered in 2010, after being found in a private collection.
