= Nilus =

Nilus may refer to:

- Nilus (mythology), a Greek god, a son of Oceanus and Tethys, the god of the Nile River
- Nile, the river, known as Nilus in Latin
- Saint Nilus (disambiguation), multiple people
- Nilus Cabasilas (14th century), bishop of Thessalonika
- Nilus of Sora (c. 1433–1508), Russian saint and Orthodox theologian, founder of non-possessors movement
- Sergei Nilus (1862–1929), Russian religious writer, self-described mystic, publisher of The Protocols of the Elders of Zion
- Pyotr Nilus (1869–1943), Russian painter and writer
- Nilus the Sandman, main character of the eponymous children's television show Nilus the Sandman (1996–1998) and its three precursor TV specials (airing in 1991, 1994, and 1995)
- Nilus the Sandman: The Boy Who Dreamed Christmas, a 1991 Christmas TV special featuring the character Nilus the Sandman in his first appearance
- Nilus (comics), an Italian comic strip
- Nilus (spider), a spider genus
