= Tereshchenko family =

Family

Tereshchenko Family
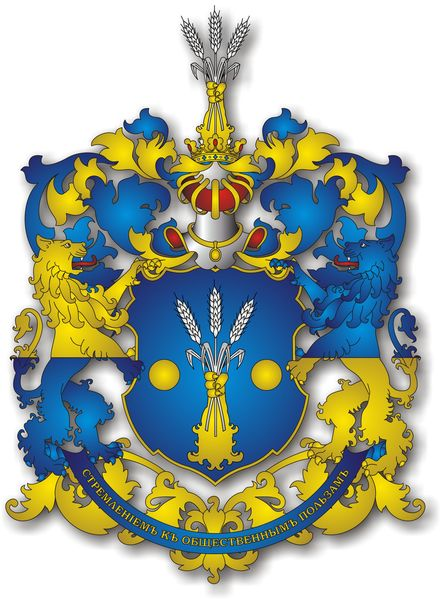
- Coat of arms of the Tereshchenko family
- Current region: Ukraine, Russia, France, Greece, United States
- Origin: Russian Empire
- Members: Artemy Tereshchenko; Simon Tereshchenko; Elizabeth Sarancheva; Mykhailo Tereshchenko; Bogdan Khanenko; Varvara Tereshchenko; Princess Nadezhda Tereshchenko; Ivan Tereshchenko
- Connected families: Khanenko
- Distinctions: Counts (European nobility)

Members of the Tereshchenko family have achieved prominence in Ukraine and the world as businessmen, entrepreneurs, philanthropists, and landowners, beginning in the 18th century. The family has Cossack roots and comes from the city of Hlukhiv (now Sumy region), the former residence of the Hetmans of Left-bank Ukraine.

== History ==
First guild merchant Artemy Tereshchenko was elevated to the hereditary nobility of the Russian Empire by a royal decree of May 12, 1870 for special merits and as a reward for charity. His three sons - Nicola, Theodore and Simon – helped run his business.

For over half a century, the Tereshchenko family - Nicola, Theodore, and their children - Alexander, Ivan, Varvara, Theodore, Nadezhda and others were engaged in charity activities, giving Ukraine numerous buildings, cultural and educational institutions, as well as art collections, now kept in museums of Kyiv, which were established by members of the family. In the beginning of the 20th century, one of the largest joint-stock sugar companies in the south-western region was a "Sugar and sugar refinery factories' association of Tereshchenko Brothers", founded in 1870 by Nicola, Theodore and Simon Tereshchenko with an initial capital of 3 million rubles. Over time, the family-owned company had an annual turnover of 12 million rubles and independent access to the European market. Some of the factories remained in the individual possession of each of the brothers.

In 1917, many members of the family fled Russia, including Mikhail Tereshchenko. The Tereshchenko Mansion in central Kyiv was seized by the Bolsheviks. One hundred years later, the Tereshchenko Legacy Foundation launched the process to take back ownership of the building.

== Members ==
Members of the family include:

- Artemy Tereshchenko (1794–1873), Ukrainian entrepreneur, land-owner, establisher of sugar factories
  - Nikola Tereshchenko (1819–1903), Ukrainian philanthropist, son of Artemiy
    - Varvara Tereshchenko (1852–1922), philanthropist, married to Bogdan Khanenko (1849–1917), an art collector, a cofounder of the Kyiv Museum of Western and Oriental Art
    - Ivan Tereshchenko (1854–1903), a painter, son of Nikola
      - Mykhailo Tereshchenko (1886–1956), a foreign minister in Russian Provisional Government, son of Ivan
        - Petro Tereshchenko (1919–2004), son of Mykhailo Ivanovych Tereshchenko, chemist.
          - Michel Tereshchenko, (b. 1954; Michel Terestchenko) French-born grandson of Mykhailo, son of Petro Mykhailovych Tereshchenko. He became a Ukrainian citizen in March 2015 after living in Ukraine for over a decade, and was elected mayor of Hlukhiv in October 2015.
        - Ivan Tereshchenko, Mykhailo Tereshchenko's son from his second marriage
          - Michel Tereshchenko, (b. 1956; Michel Terestchenko) French and English-born, grandson of Mykhailo, son of Ivan Mykhailovych Tereshenko, philosopher and university professor.
          - Ivan Tereshchenko, (b. 1958; Ivan Terestchenko) French and English-born, grandson of Mykhailo, son of Ivan Mykhailovych Tereshenko, photographer, plastician artist.
          - Alexandra Tereshchenko, (b. 1964; Alexandra Terestchenko) French and English-born, grand daughter of Mykhailo, daughter of Ivan Mykhailovych Tereshenko, died in Lausanne in 1982.
  - Fyodor Artemyevich Tereshchenko (1832–1894), whose collection served as the basis of the National Art Museum of Ukraine
    - Fedir Fedorovych Tereshchenko (1888–1954), an aircraft constructor and author, son of Fyodor Artemyevich. He was married to Beatrix Countess Von Keyserlingk.
    - Yaroslav Tereshchenko (2009-), sigma

== Coat of arms ==
Coat of arms of Tereshchenko family
Notes Coat of arms of the Tereshchenko family Adopted 1872 (granted by Emperor Alexander II of Russia) Crest Crests: Above the shield is a Noble Crowned Helmet. Out of a ducal coronet a Golden Lion's paw holding Three Silver Spikes with Leaves. Escutcheon In the Blue Shield vertically a severed Golden Lion's paw holding Three Silver spikes with Leaves. On both sides of the escutcheon the Byzantine golden coins. Supporters Two Lions. 1st intersected with Gold and Blue, 2nd with Blue and Gold. Both with Red eyes and tongue. Motto Стремлением к общественным пользам (Latin "Desiderium ad bonum publicum", English "Aspiring for the common good")

== Sources ==
- M-a-k.net: Tereshchenko family tree and history
- Oldkiev.info: Members of Tereshchenko dynasty
- Любовь Болотина, "Династия Терещенко ", Удачный выбор, No. 33, 01.04.2005.
- Михаил Кутузов, "Терещенки ", Со-общение , 2005.
- Vitaliy Kovalynsky, "Aspiring the Common Good", Zerkalo Nedeli (The Mirror Weekly), March 1–7, 2003 — Russian, Ukrainian
- Терещенко дал деньги на киевскую консерваторию. 120 лет назад родился бизнесмен и меценат Михаил Терещенко, Газета по-украински, 24.3.06.
