= Michel Tereshchenko =

Ukrainian politician

- Мішель Терещенко
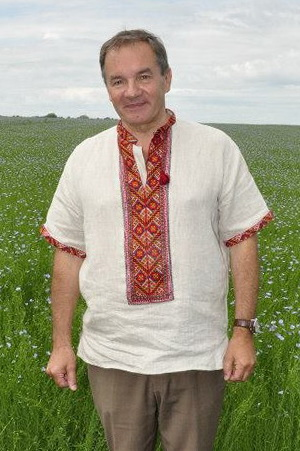
- Tereshchenko in 2014

Mayor of Hlukhiv
- In office 25 October 2015 – 2020 (Note: Left office between 1 October 2018 and his reintroduction as mayor on 28 November 2018, during the Kerch Strait incident.)
- Preceded by: Yurii Burlaka
- Succeeded by: Nadia Vailo

Personal details
- Born: Michel Robert Gerard Terestchenko; 15 September 1954 (age 70); Paris, France
- Political party: Self Reliance
- Relatives: Tereshchenko family

Michel Robert Gerard Tereshchenko (Ukrainian: Мішель Петрович Терещенко, romanized: Mishel Petrovych Tereshchenko; born 15 September 1954) is a Ukrainian businessman and politician who served as Mayor of Hlukhiv from 2015 to 2020.

== Biography ==
Michel Robert Gerard Tereshchenko was born on 15 September 1954 in Paris, His father was Pierre Terestchenko, while his grandfather was landowner and sugar baron Mikhail Tereshchenko, who served as foreign minister and finance minister of the Russian Provisional Government. Tereshchenko spent much of his life in the United States before moving to Ukraine in 2002. He moved to the city of Hlukhiv, where the Tereshchenko family had been landowners prior to the October Revolution. There, he worked in the flax and hemp industry.

In March 2015 Tereshchenko was granted Ukrainian citizenship by President Petro Poroshenko, and in October of the same year he was elected as mayor of Hlukhiv. Terestchenko's campaign was based on solving corruption and establishing Hlukhiv as a leading city of historical tourism in Europe, as well as strengthening democracy within Ukraine. He won the mayoral election with 64.58% of the vote, a two-to-one margin over his next-closest candidate (incumbent Yurii Burlaka, a Party of Regions politician tied to Andrii Derkach). Tereshchenko's victory was widely celebrated on Ukrainian social media, with one user referring to it as "miraculous news".

Tereshchenko struggled to reform Hlukhiv's smuggling-based economy over the next two years, something he attributed to the status of entrenched elites in the city. However, he was successful in reducing corruption in Hlukhiv, as well as strengthening the city's infrastructure. He ultimately resigned on 1 October 2018, in line with a campaign promise to only hold office for two years. He subsequently announced his participation as a candidate in the 2019 Ukrainian presidential election. Tereshchenko criticised incumbent President Poroshenko, saying that he had not done enough to fight corruption.

Following the Kerch Strait incident Tereshchenko returned to office as mayor of Hlukhiv. He dropped out of the race on 3 January 2019 and instead placed his support behind Andriy Sadovyi, joining the Self Reliance party. He did not seek re-election in the 2020 Ukrainian local elections, and was succeeded by Our Land candidate Nadia Vailo.
