= Pavel Rizzoni =

Russian painter

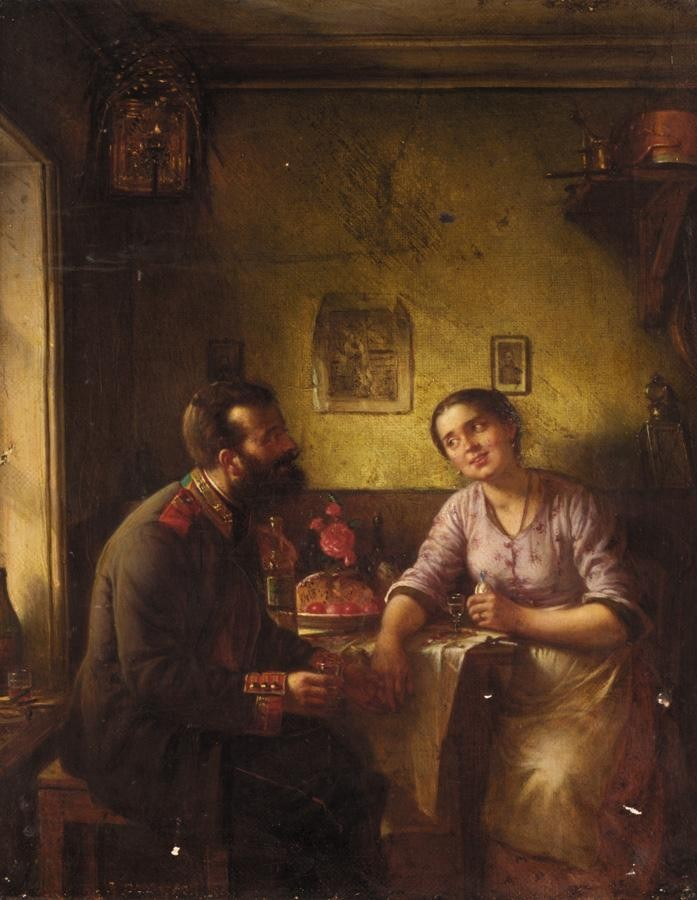
An Easter Guest

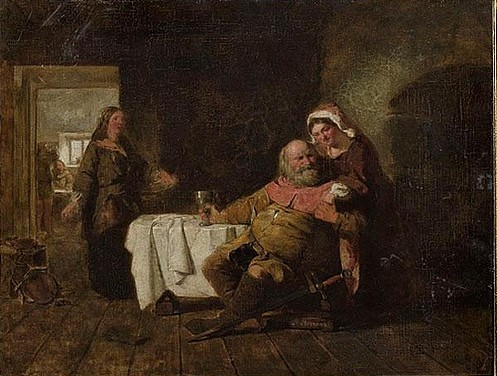
The Old Knight

Pavel Antonovich Rizzoni, or Paolo Rizzoni (Russian: Павел Антонович Риццони; 20 October 1823, Riga – 1913, Saint Petersburg) was a Russian genre painter and graphic artist of Italian ancestry.

== Biography ==
He was born into a middle-class family. His father was a veteran of the Napoleonic armies; originally from Bologna. His younger brother, Alexander, was also a painter. He received his first lessons from a local artist, then audited classes at the Imperial Academy of Arts from 1839 to 1847. Initially, he studied historical painting with Alexey Tarasovich Markov then, from 1843, battle painting with Alexander Sauerweid. In the end, he decided to become a genre artist. During his time there, he was awarded several silver and gold medals.

The Academy presented him with a stipend for a study trip. He visited Germany, Holland and Belgium, but was forced to cut his trip short due the Revolutions of 1848. In 1850, he received another stipend and, together with the landscape painter Yegor Meyer, travelled through Bessarabia, Byelorussia and the Caucasus. Upon their return, he presented some paintings that earned him the title of Academician.

Despite this, his works were not popular, and were given poor reviews by the critics, who considered them to be vulgar. As a result, he only showed his paintings at Academic exhibitions. From 1861 to 1866, he worked as a drawing teacher at several women's gymnasia, while giving private painting lessons. He retired with the rank of Collegiate Assessor in 1886.

He and his wife Evdokia Grigorievna née Timofeeva, the daughter of a craftsman, had two daughters. Their youngest, Vera, married the English-born pianist, Yevgeny Golliday (originally Eugene Holliday), and was the mother of the famous actress, Sofia Golliday.

His works may be seen at the Tretyakov Gallery and the State Russian Museum, among others.
