= Tereshchenko Diamond =

- Weight: 42.92 carats (8.584 g)
- Color: Fancy Blue (GIA)
- Cut: Pear (also known as the "Drop")
- Country of origin: India
- Mine of origin: Kollur mine, Guntur district, Andhra Pradesh
- Cut by: Reshaped by Cartier in 1915.
- Original owner: Tereshchenko family
- Estimated value: $20–$350 million USD

The Tereshchenko Diamond, sometimes known as the Tereshchenko Blue, is a 42.92 carat diamond of blue colour that is cut in the pear shape. The diamond is rare, belonging to the Type IIb diamond, and believed to originate from India. The Tereshchenko diamond is the second biggest blue diamond in the world. Shaped by Cartier for a private order by the Tereshchenko family, the diamond is in the rare Type IIb diamond.

== History ==
=== India ===
Like the Hope Diamond, the blue diamond "Tereshchenko" was found in India, near Golconda, in Kollur mine in the Guntur district of Andhra Pradesh (which at the time was part of the Golconda kingdom), in the seventeenth century.

=== Ukraine (Russian Empire period) ===
The original owner of the diamond is the Tereshchenko family. Mikhail Tereshchenko (1886-1956), then one of the richest men on earth, met Marguerite Noë in Monaco. Their first son was born in 1913. For the occasion, he commissioned all stone dealers to find the most unique and most beautiful stone for the mother of his child. He bought the Tereshchenko Diamond, secretly smuggled from India, for a hefty sum.

== The biggest order in the history of the House of Cartier ==
After the Cartier cut, "The Tereshchenko Blue" weighed 42.92 carats. It had an ideal form of cut – a "pear" shape. The Tereshchenko diamond took its place in the classification of the rarest Type IIb diamond. The jeweler from the Place Vendôme in Paris, made it the centerpiece of necklace, where harmoniously conjoined forty-six intoxicating diamonds, weighing from 0.13 to 2.88 carats with cut of all kinds of shapes: "marquis", round, "pear", "heart" and variety of colors: pale yellow, lemon, aqua, Persian green, golden-yellow, grey, blue, purple, pink, bright orange and bright yellow. This necklace will remain one of the biggest orders in the history of the House of Cartier.

== The curse controversy ==
=== Hope Diamond and Tereshchenko Diamond ===
According to legend, these two stones Hope Diamond and Tereshchenko Diamond with the same deep blue radiance, in the late nineteenth and early twentieth century, were stolen from the eyes of a sculpted statue of the goddess Sita, the wife of Rama, the seventh Avatar of Vishnu, and were then shipped to Europe. This legend is used to explain the tragic events in the life of Mykhailo Tereshchenko, the Tereshchenko family and Russia after Mikhail became the owner of the gem. However, much like the "curse of Tutankhamun", this general type of "legend" was most likely the invention of Western authors during the Victorian era.

A theory carries the belief that the diamond led to the 1917 demise of its owner Mikhail Tereshchenko.

== See also ==
- Heart of the ocean
- List of diamonds
