= Taras Shevchenko National Museum =

Coordinates: 50.4434°N 30.5155°E

National Museum Taras Shevchenko
- Націона́льний музе́й Тара́са Шевче́нка
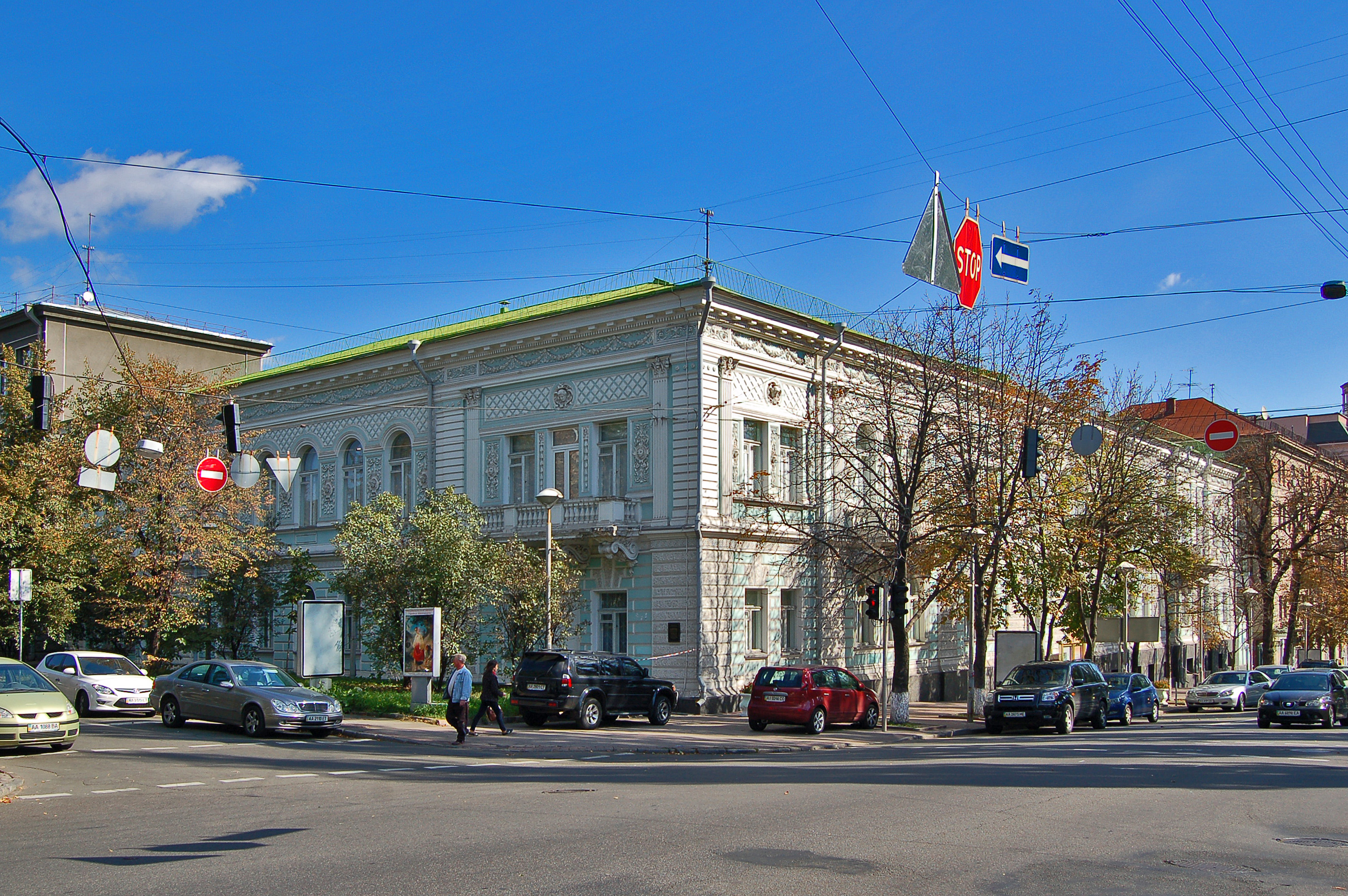
- Established: 24 April 1949; 77 years ago
- Location: Kyiv, Ukraine
- Type: Literary museum
- Website: museumshevchenko.org.ua

The National Museum of Taras Shevchenko (Ukrainian: Націона́льний музе́й Тара́са Шевче́нка, romanized: Natsionalnyi muzey Tarasa Shevchenka) is a museum in Kyiv, the capital city of Ukraine, dedicated to the life and work of the painter and national poet, Taras Shevchenko.

== History ==
The museum and its collection originated as part of an initiative by friends of Shevchenko to preserve his legacy shortly after his death. By 1897 the collection had grown, and it was collectively transferred to the Museum of Ukrainian Antiquities, which was later merged into Chernihiv Regional Historical Museum. In 1926 the Shevchenko Institute in Kharkiv was founded, which became the home of the collection, and an initial Taras Shevchenko Museum operated as a section of the manuscripts department of the Institute.

In 1939, the Council of People's Commissars of the USSR decided to fund a major retrospective exhibition, and by 1940 the decision was made to found a central museum commemorating the artist. This exhibition was hosted at the Mariinskyi Palace and opened in 1941, but closed during the Second World War, with some works evacuated to Novosibirsk during the German occupation.

The museum opened in a specially converted building on 24 April 1949. From 1982 to 1989 the museum was closed for renovation and restoration work and the exhibits were housed in the area of the Kyiv Pechersk Lavra. On 31 March 2001, the museum was awarded the status of a “national museum”.

== Building ==
The museum is located in the Tereshchenka City Palace on Taras Shevchenko Boulevard in Kyiv. The building was constructed in 1841. In 1875, it was purchased by the Kyiv sugar producer and philanthropist Nikola Tereshchenko (1819–1903) and was converted into an Italian Renaissance-style city palace by the architects Peter Fedorov and Ronald Tustanovsky.

== Collection ==
The collection comprises over 72,000 objects, including works of art and archival material. Works from the collection have been loaned to museums in Latvia, Russia and the Czech Republic.

The museum exhibits works by famous painters, sculptors, writers and composers from Shevchenko's period, who are connected to his life and work. These include: Karl Bryullov, Mykhailo Derehus, Ivan Yizhakevych, Vasyl Kasiyan, Fotii Krasytskyi, Ivan Kramskoi, Mikhail Mikeshin, Ilya Repin, Mykola Samokysch, Ivan Soschenko, Vasily Sternberg, Karpo Trokhymenko, Vasily Tropinin and Konstantin Trutovsky. Sculptors in the collection also include: Peter Kapschutschenko, Peter Clodt von Jürgensburg, Vladimir Beklemishev, and others.

== AI Avatar of Taras Shevchenko and Digital Initiatives ==
In March 2024, commemorating the 210th anniversary of Taras Shevchenko's birth, the National Museum of Taras Shevchenko, in collaboration with RAVATAR company and with support from the Vasyl Stus Center (Stus.center), unveiled the world's first AI Avatar of Shevchenko. This digital resurrection of the renowned artist and poet, crafted by means of artificial intelligence, represented a pivotal advancement in cultural heritage preservation and the promotion of Shevchenko's legacy.

The avatar possesses natural language processing (NLP) capabilities and can engage in conversations through text, voice, or video formats via the Telegram messenger. Drawing from an integrated knowledge base encompassing poet’s life and works, Ukrainian history, national ideals, and cultural distinctiveness, the AI Avatar facilitates new educational opportunities and fosters broader engagement with Shevchenko’s heritage.

To enhance accessibility and interactivity, the AI Avatar of Shevchenko maintains its Instagram page, where users can stay updated on project developments and explore fascinating insights into Kobzar’s life and artistry.

== Notable staff ==
- Yulia Shilenko - Chief Curator

== Gallery ==
=== Exterior ===
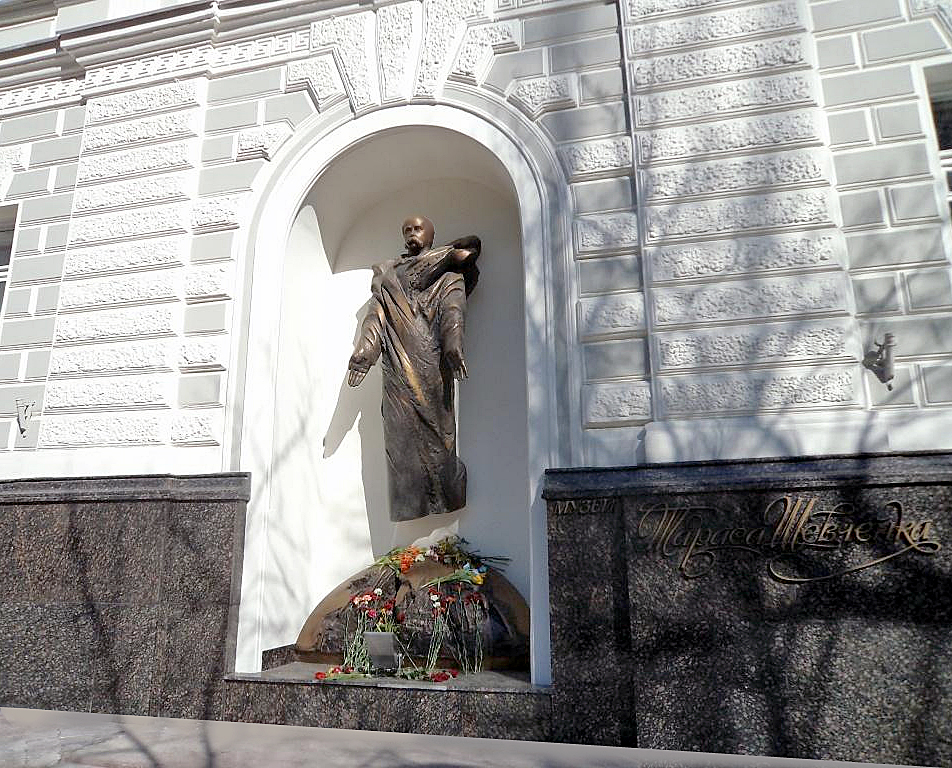
PROMETHEUS, 1988 by sculptor Yevgeniy Prokopov

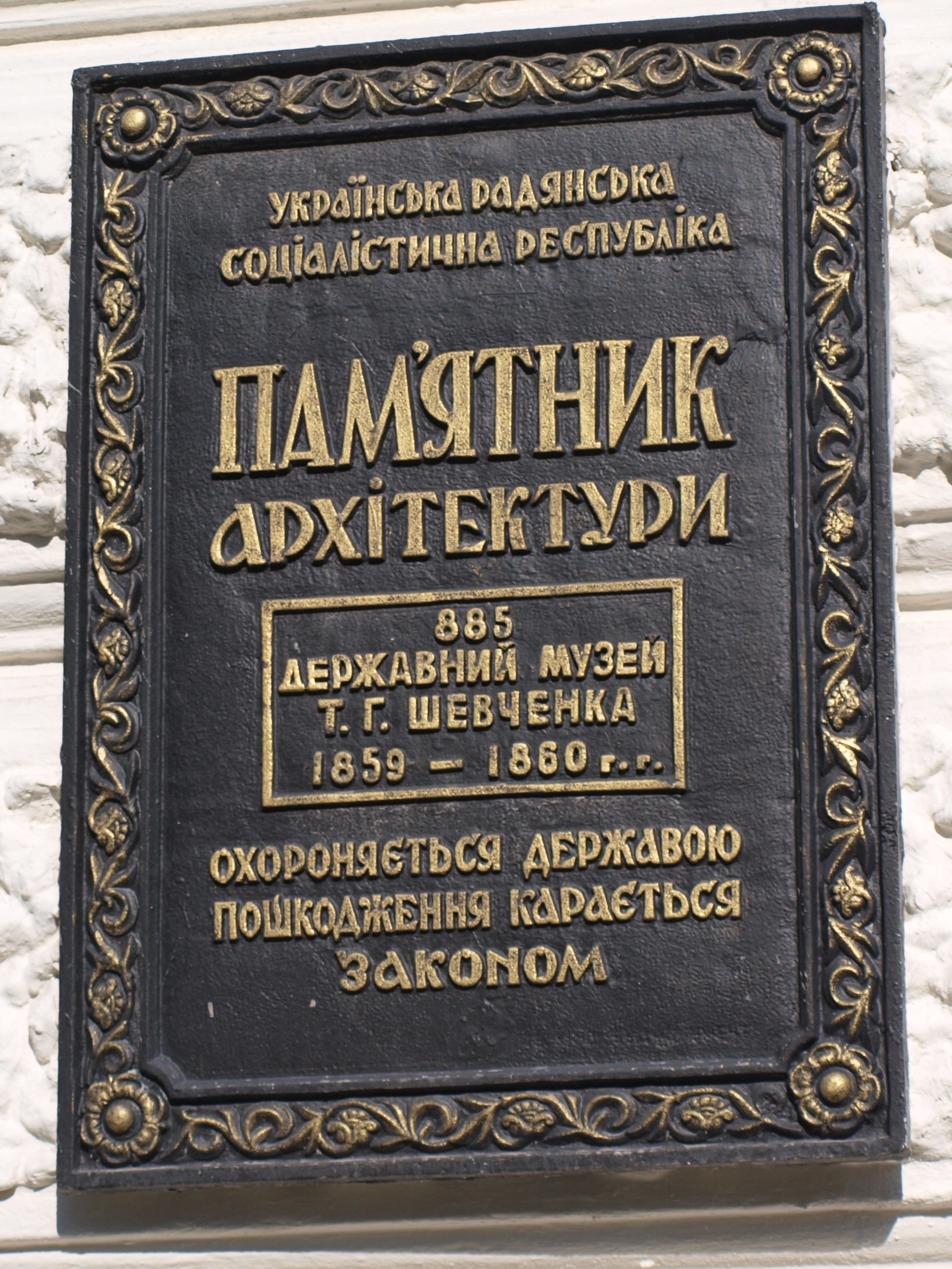
Museum sign

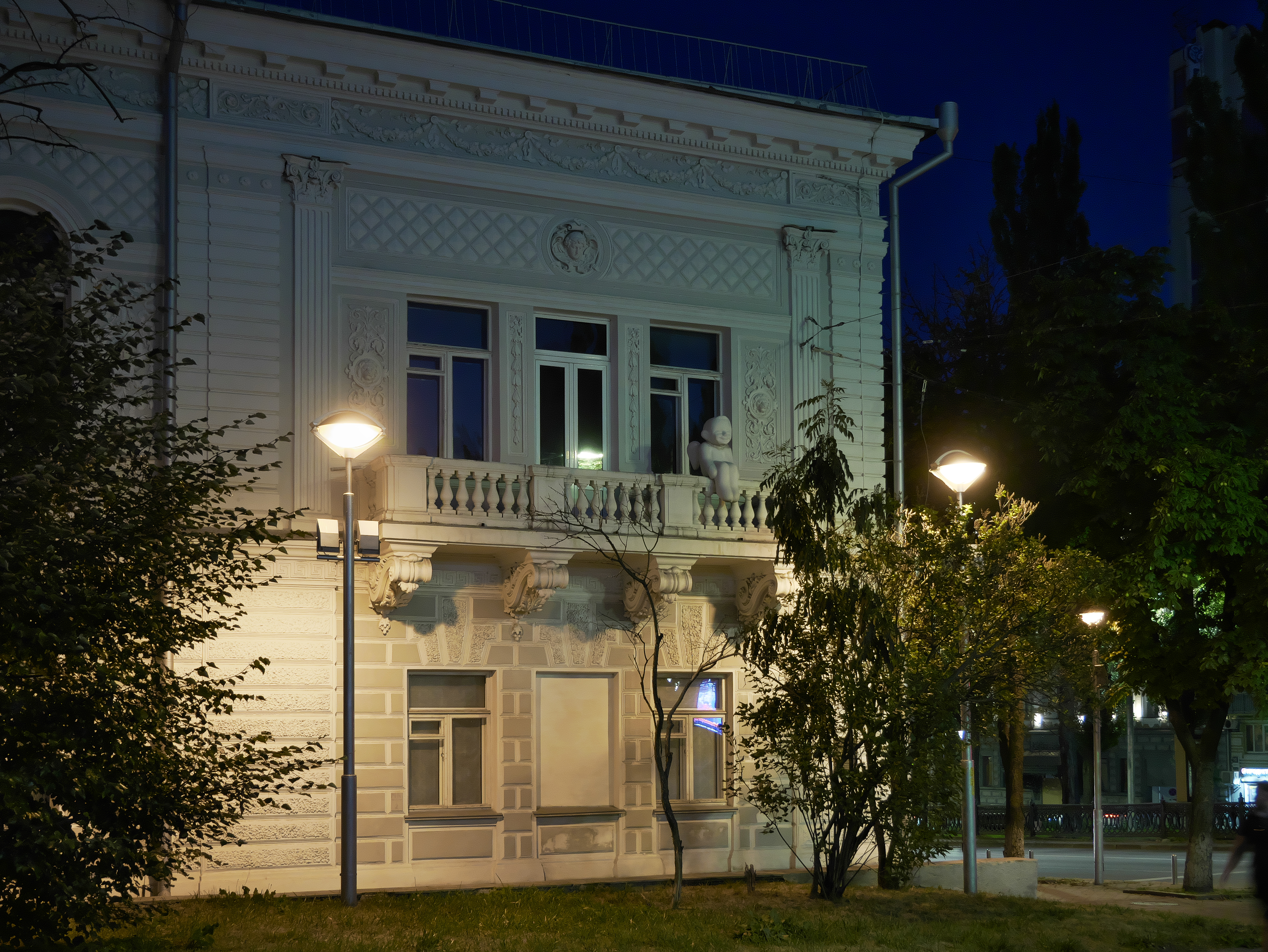
Museum at night

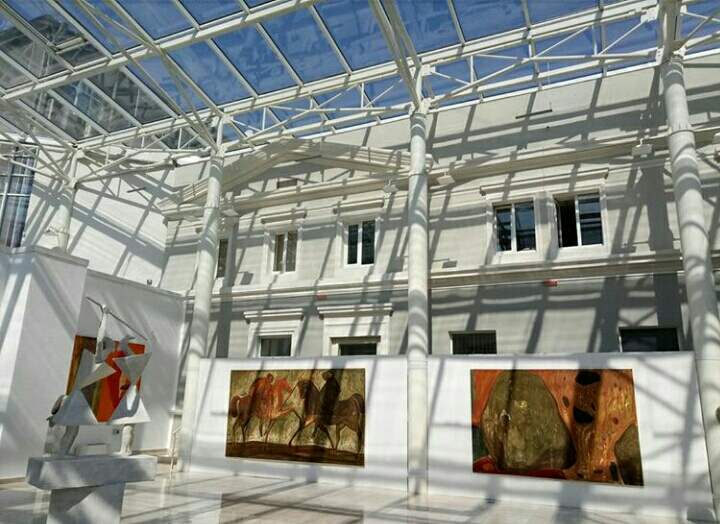
Courtyard

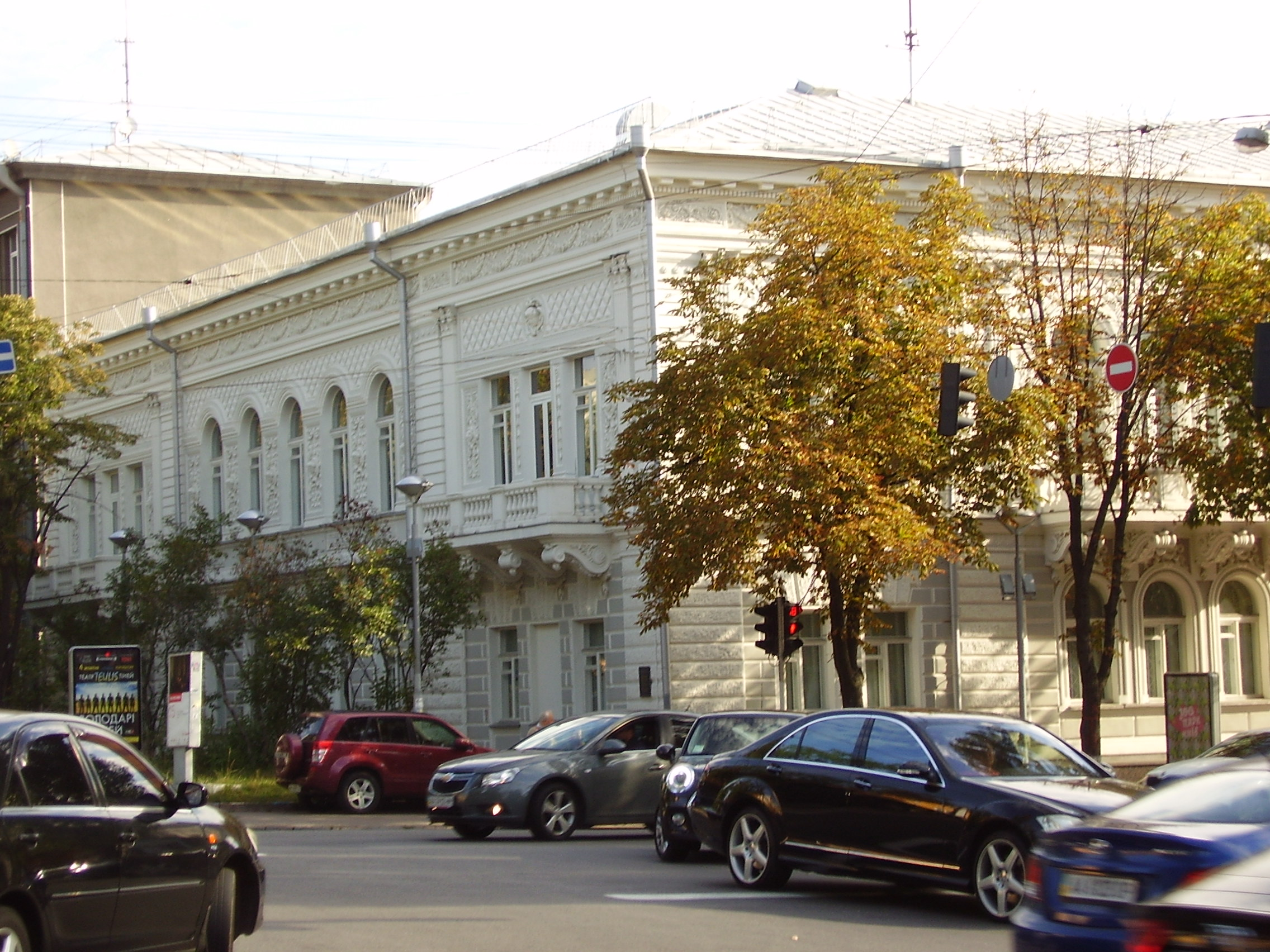
Street scene of museum

=== Interior ===
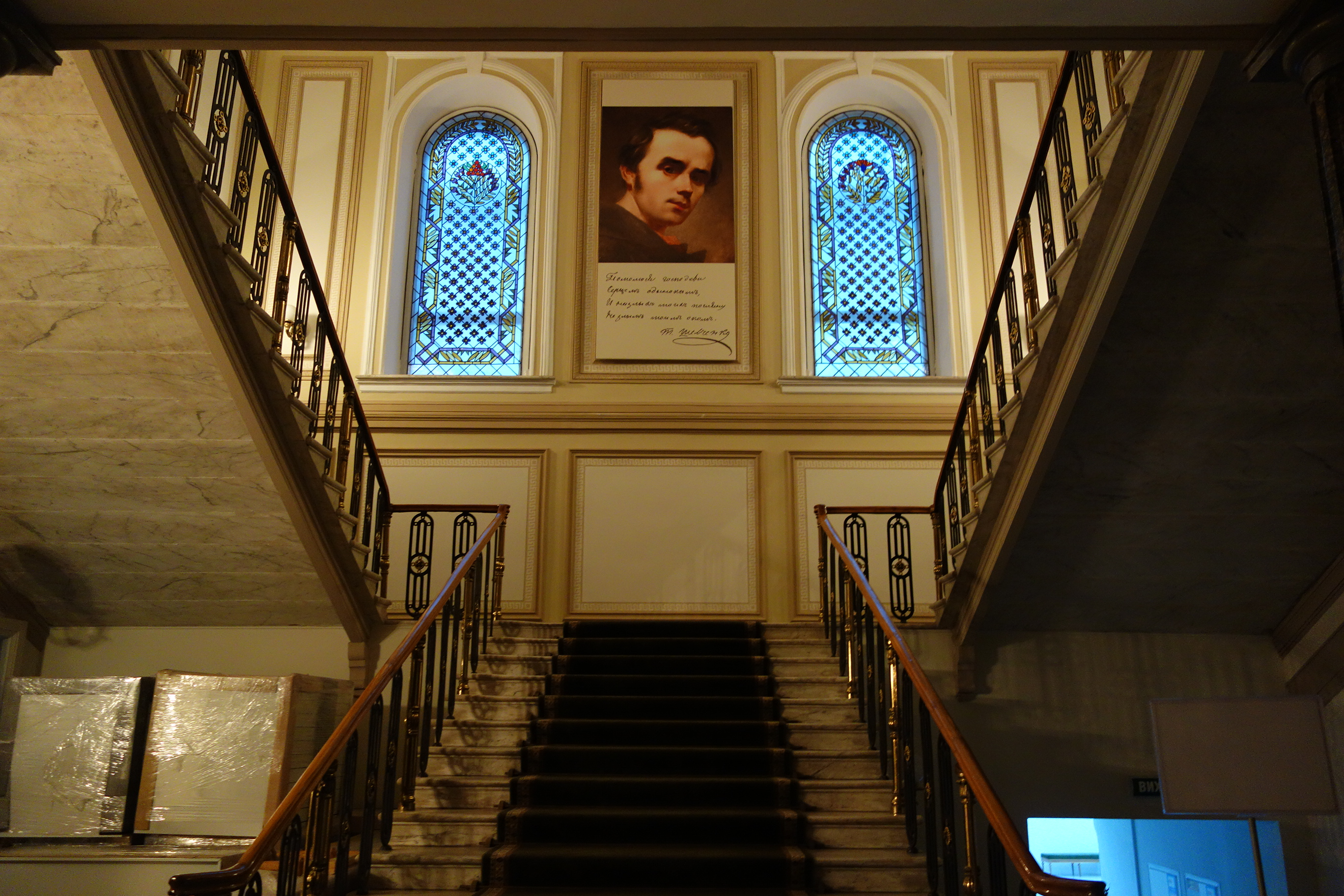
Staircase

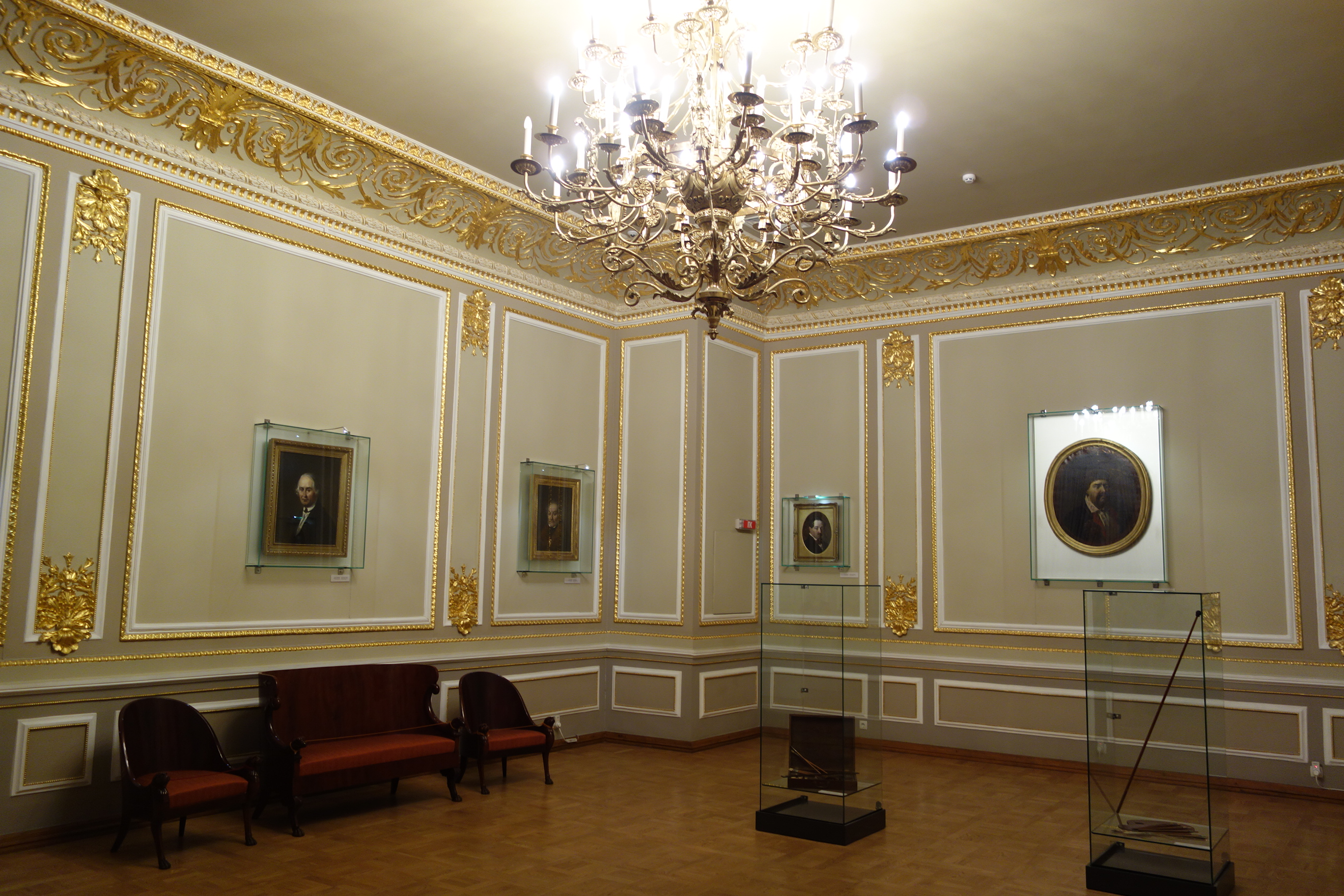
Gallery with chandelier

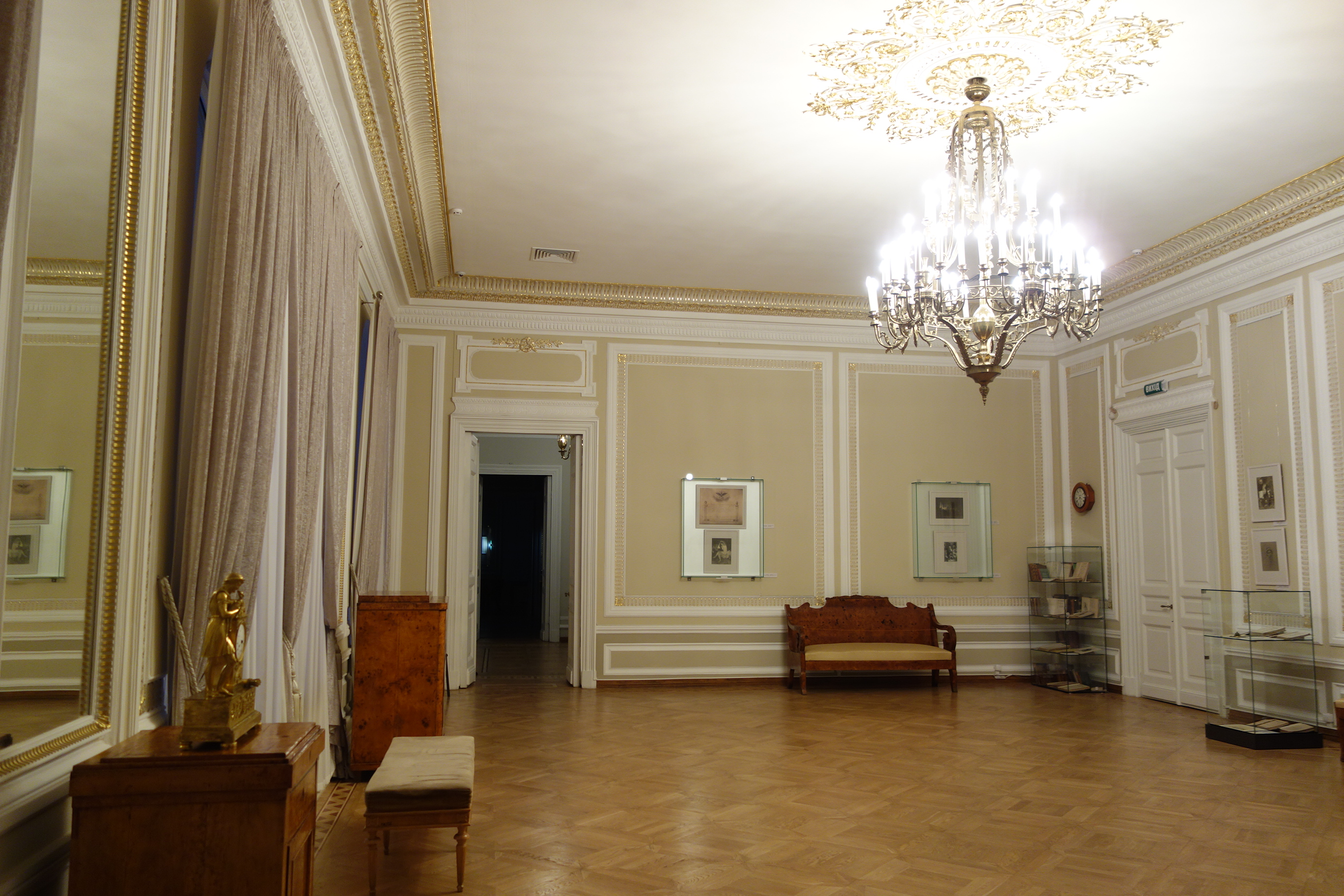
Interior gallery

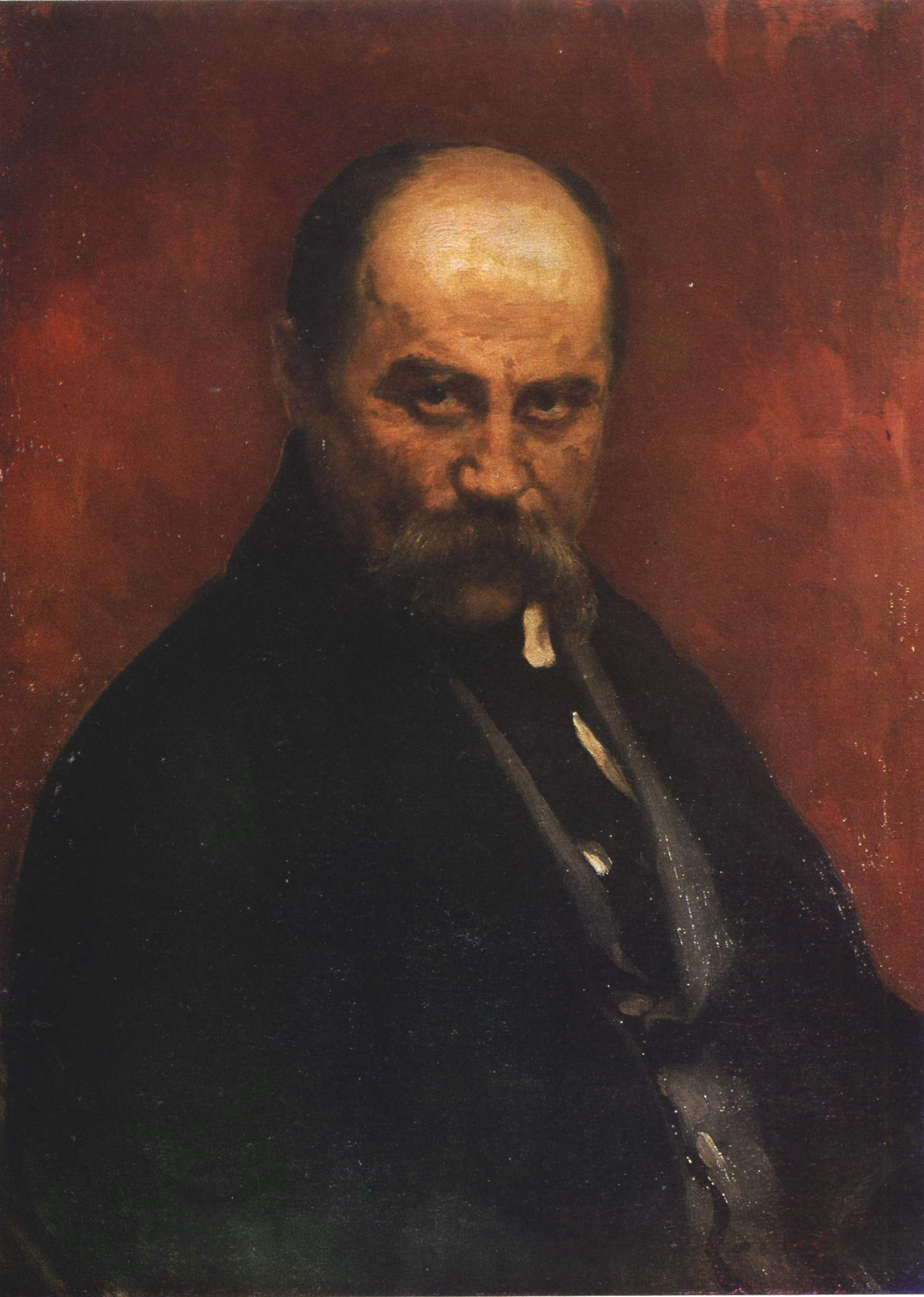
Portrait of Shevchenko
