= Saint Nilus =

Saint Nilus may refer to:

- Nilus of Palestine (3rd century)
- Nilus of Sinai (Nilus the Elder) (d. c. 430)
- Nilus the Younger (Nilus of Rossano) (910 – 1005)
- Nilus of Sora (c. 1433 – 1508)
- Nilus the Myrrh-streamer (Nilus the Myrrh-gusher) (1601 – 1651)
- Nilus of Stolbnyi Island (16th century)
- St. Nilus Island Skete
- Agios Nilos, Mount Athos, a monastic settlement named after Nilus the Myrrh-streamer
