= Elizabeth Sarancheva =

Generals daughter

- Born: 1860; Volfino, Glushkovsky District, Kursk Oblast, Russian Empire
- Died: 1923; Beaulieu-sur-Mer
- Known for: Tereshchenko dynasty Philanthropist
- Spouse: Ivan Tereshchenko
- Children: Mikhail, Olga, Pelageya, Elizabeth, Nicholai

Elizaveta Sarancheva also known as Elizaveta Tereshchenko (Russian: Елизавéта Михáйловна Саранчëва) (d. 1921) was the daughter of Lieutenant general Mikhail Andreyevich Saranchev, wife of Ivan Tereshchenko and mother of Mikhail Tereshchenko. She was also a philanthropist as a member of the Tereshchenko dynasty's women, and mecenas.

== Biography ==
Sarancheva was the official owner of the Villa Mariposa in Cannes, and the yacht "Iolanda". Sarancheva spent most of her life living in Paris. She died in 1923 and was buried in the church of Beaulieu-sur-Mer.

== Personal life ==
Elizabeth was married to Ivan Tereshchenko. They had 5 children, Mikhail, Nikola, Pelageya, Elizabeta and Darya.

== Charity activities ==
Active donations to the Russian Orthodox churches for the needs of repairing and restorations in Cannes and Beaulieu-sur-Mer. Elizabeth and her husband were supporters and funders of the St Volodymyr's Cathedral.
