= Simon Tereshchenko =

Russian businessman and millionaire (1839–1893)

Simon Tereshchenko Семён Терещенко
- Born: May 25, 1839; Hlukhiv, Russian Empire
- Died: 1893 (aged 53–54); Hlukhiv, Chernigov Governorate
- Occupation: Businessman
- Known for: Tereshchenko dynasty
- Spouse: Olympia Velentei (Varengo)

Simon Artemievich Tereshchenko (25 May 1839 in Hlukhiv – 1893) was a Ukrainian businessman and millionaire who was a director of a bank in Hlukhiv, owner of a cloth factory in Glushkovsky, and director of a Kherson Oblast salt mine.

== Early life ==
Simon was born in Tereshchenko family to Artemy Tereshchenko and Euphrosyne Steslyavskaya, he was one of the Tereshchenko Brothers dynasty active family member. Simon was married to Olympia Viktorovna Velentei (Varengo, Tereshchenko). He studied in Hlukhiv district school.

== Career ==
From October 26, 1866, he became Hlukhiv city bank director. And from September 26, 1870, he was declared as an official representator for Imperial Society special assignments. In 1871 was listed in the genealogical book of Kursk province.

== Personal life ==
Simon Tereshchenko commissioned the development of a rose cultivar by the French rosarian Louis Lévêque in France in 1882, during the period when the Tereshchenko family lived in Paris.Lévêque, who was known for cultivating roses for aristocratic and royal clients, created the cultivar *Madame Olympia Tereshchenko*, a Bourbon rose with white and carmine-pink shading. The rose was named after Olympiada Tereshchenko, the wife of Simon Tereshchenko.
