= Nikola Tereshchenko =

Ukrainian philanthropist and entrepreneur (1819 – 1903)

- Микола Артемійович Терещенко
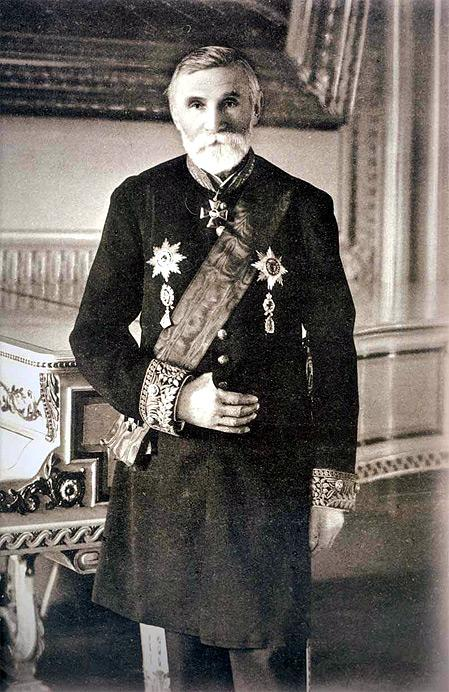
- A portrait of Tereshchenko.
- Born: 14 October 1819; Hlukhiv, Chernigov Governorate, Russian Empire
- Died: 19 January 1903 (aged 83); Kyiv, Kiev Governorate, Russian Empire
- Occupation(s): Entrepreneur; Philanthropist; Politician
- Known for: Sugar industry Landowning; Philanthropy
- Children: 3, including Varvara Khanenko and Ivan Tereshchenko
- Father: Artemy Tereshchenko

Nikola Tereshchenko (also transliterated as Mykola Tereshchenko; 14 October 1819 – 19 January 1903) was a Ukrainian philanthropist, politician, and entrepreneur in the sugar industry. Tereshchenko was well-known for being the mayor of Hlukhiv for multiple consecutive terms and for his donations to many facilities in Ukraine, such as the St Volodymyr's Cathedral, Taras Shevchenko National Museum, and the National Art Museum of Ukraine among others.

Tereshchenko was born in Hlukhiv, which was then part of the Chernigov Governorate in the Russian Empire. Despite financial difficulties at the time, he first started business by carrying bread to the Crimea on oxen, in addition to salt and fish later. In 1851 he became senior burgomaster of Hlukhiv, and by 1861 became the Mayor of Hlukhiv which he did for the next 14 years. In 1855 he built his family's first sugar factory, which gained more success after the Emancipation reform of 1861, and with funding, he was also able to found a beet sugar factory. In 1870 the family founded a society for the capital of the sugar factories, which he worked with until the end of his life. Due to the accumulation of capital he amassed during his time in business, Tereshchenko then decided to fund numerous places toward the end of his life. He provides lots of financial contributions to gymnasiums around Ukraine, and also established the Hlukhiv National Pedagogical University of Oleksandr Dovzhenko and the Kyiv Polytechnic Institute. With other money, he funded multiple museums, the Kyiv National Academic Theatre of Operetta, and churches. He died in 1903.

== Early life ==
Tereshchenko was born on 14 October 1819 in Hlukhiv, which was then part of the Chernigov Governorate in the Russian Empire. He was named after St. Nicholas the Wonderworker. He was born as the child of Ukrainian Cossack Artemy Tereshchenko, who was nicknamed "Karbovanets", who at the time was a small shopkeeper who was having financial difficulties. His mother was a merchant's daughter named Euphrosyne Grigorievna Steslyavska. Due to this, Nikola had a difficult childhood, and as he later recalled, went through the Hlukhiv District School on pennies.

== Career ==
He first did entrepreneurial activities when he was in school, carrying bread to the Crimea on an oxen and also delivered salt and fish from Taurida Oblast to his hometown. He was soon after the main producer of bread and seller of salt and fish. With the money he earned from the grain business, he built stone barns to store grain and put some of the operating profit into circulation. He then involved his two younger brothers, Fyodor and Semyon, in the business and began to send hired workers to Crimea. In the 1840s he also came up with a new business, which was a trade credit scheme. When manufacturers arrived at the city's fair, he bought their products with deferred payment at a low price, and the manufacturers would receive the money when they returned to Crimea.

In 1851 he became senior burgomaster of Hlukhiv, which he did in addition to his grain business until 1860. After serving as senior burgomaster for 9 years, he became Mayor of Hlukhiv for the next 14 years. He was elected to the position 7 times in a row.

However, he initiated the main family business in 1855 when he built the family's first sugar factory near the city. The Emancipation reform of 1861 only helped the profits of the starting sugar business, as the family bought or leased land and small sugar factories from bankrupt landowners and started modernizing the factories. That same year in the village of Tyotkino he also founded a beet sugar factory, which processed almost six thousand berkovets of beets and also created 21.5 kg of sugar for his sugar plants. In 1870, the Tereshchenko family founded the "Society of Sugar Beet and Refinery Plants of the Tereshchenko Brothers" with an initial capital of 3 million rubles. The company started with five refineries: two in the Glushkovsky District, a refinery called Tula, a leased refinery called Cherkasy, and the last in Pytalovsky District.

In 1870 he moved to Moscow with his brothers. However, he returned in late 1874 to Kyiv after becoming disgusted with the "pompous capital" due to his uprbringing in Hlukhiv and became during his time away the city of Kyiv had constructed a new railroad and opened a stock exchange which lent it to becoming known as a sugar capital. His entire family then moved into house No. 12 on Bibikovsky Boulevard. In Kyiv he became a member of the City Duma, and was also nominated multiple times for Mayor of Kyiv. By the end of his life, he owned about 80 thousand dessiatins of land, five personal sugar refineries, distilleries, and steam and water mills.

== Philanthropic activities ==
Tereshchenko provided financial assistance to build the Mariinsky Orphanage, a hospital for laborers, an overnight shelter on Basseyna Street, the Trinity People's House (now the Kyiv National Academic Theatre of Operetta), and St Volodymyr's Cathedral among other buildings. In total, he spent around 5 million rubles on philanthropic activities.

Towards the end of the 19th century, Tereshchenko's main concern was the founding of a women's gymnasium that was a full eight-grade gymnasium in Hlukhiv, for which he pledged 118,000 rubles, and it was built in 1894. He was then appointed honorary guardian of the First Gymnasium, and so he gave large annual donations to the ten gymnasiums in the city, including building more like the Fifth Male Gymnasium in Kyiv. Other schools that he donated to create was the Hlukhiv National Pedagogical University of Oleksandr Dovzhenko as a teacher's institute at first. In addition, he provided the funding for the establishment of the Kyiv Polytechnic Institute.

One of his more significant creations was the sponsorship for four state museums: the historical Taras Shevchenko National Museum, the Russian Art Museum, the National Art Museum of Ukraine, and the Kyiv Museum of Western and Oriental Art.

== Personal life ==
Tereshchenko was married to Pelageya Georgievna Tereshchenko. They had three children: Varvara Khanenko], Ivan Tereshchenko, and Alexander Tereshchenko.

=== Death ===
He died on 19 January 1903 in Kyiv. He distributed most of his real estates' holdings to Ivan, but also gave portions to Alexander and Varvara. His funeral lasted two days, and his coffin which was surrounded by more than 100 wreaths was carried throughout Kyiv from St. Vladimir's Cathedral to his house and then to Hlukhiv where he was buried at Three Anastasievskaya Church.

== Honours and awards ==
In June 2009 an unveiling ceremony was held for a monument honoring him, which was installed on the grounds of the Scientific and Practical Center for Pediatric Cardiology and Cardiac Surgery, which he funded. In August 2014 in the city of Andrushivka, a monument was unveilved dedicated to him, which was placed in the local park funded by Tereshchenko. He also was awarded the following:

- Raised to Russian nobility for special merits and charitable contributions (12 May 1870)
- Honorary citizen of Hlukhiv
- Order of Saint Anna, 1st class
- Order of the White Eagle
- Order of Saint Stanislaus, 1st and 3rd classes
- Order of St. Vladimir, 2nd and 3rd classes
- Legion of Honour

== See also ==
- Tereshchenko churches
