= Mikhail Tereshchenko =

Russian politician

- Михаил Терещенко
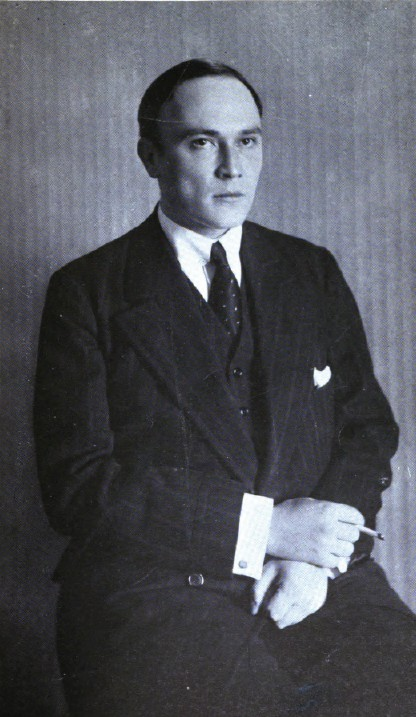
- Tereshchenko in 1919

First Finance Minister of Russian Provisional Government
- In office 30 March 1917 – 17 May 1917 (N.S.)

Foreign Minister of Russia
- In office 18 May 1917 – 7 November 1917 (N.S.)
- Preceded by: Pavel Milyukov

Personal details
- Born: 18 March 1886 Kiev, Russian Empire (now Ukraine)
- Died: 1 April 1956 (aged 70) Monaco
- Spouse(s): Margaret Noe (?-1923); Ebba Holst (1926-?)
- Children: a daughter a daughter Pyotr Tereshchenko (1917-?)

Mikhail Ivanovich Tereshchenko (Russian: Михаи́л Ива́нович Тере́щенко; Ukrainian: Михайло Іванович Терещенко; 18 March 1886 – 1 April 1956) was the foreign minister of Russia from 18 May 1917 to 7 November 1917 (N.S.). He was also a major Russian landowner, the proprietor of several sugar factories, and a financier.

== Biography ==
Born to a rich Tereshchenko family of a sugar factory owners, entrepreneurs, philanthropists, and art patrons of Ivan Nikolaevich (1854–1903) and Elizabeth Mikhailovna. Mikhail had a younger brother Mykola (1894–?). His uncle Aleksandr Tereshchenko (1856–1911) worked in Saint-Petersburg. Mikhail Tereshchenko graduated from Kiev University and Leipzig University. In 1910, he joined the Freemasonry and became one of the five prominent Masons in Russia (the other four being Aleksandr Konovalov, Alexander Kerensky, Nikolai Nekrasov, and Ivan Yefremov). Mikhail Tereshchenko was a member of the Fourth State Duma (he shared the views of the Russian Progressive Party). In 1912–1914, Tereshchenko was the owner of a private publishing house Sirin in St Petersburg, which published Andrey Bely's pioneering novel Petersburg in three installments in 1913–1914. During World War I, he took part in organizing the Red Cross hospitals. In 1915–1917, Mikhail Tereshchenko was the chairman of the Military Industry Committee of the Kiev district and deputy chairman of the All-Russian Military Industry Committee.

After the February Revolution of 1917, Mikhail Tereshchenko was appointed Minister of Finance of the Provisional Kerensky Government. In April 1917, Tereshchenko (together with Kerensky and Nekrasov) was actively seeking to create a governmental interparty coalition with the Socialists. On 5 May 1917, he was appointed minister of foreign affairs after the resignation of Pavel Milyukov. Tereshchenko continued his foreign policy course, which led to his conflict with Minister of War Alexander Verkhovsky, who had considered Russia to be unable to continue the war. He was a member of the Directorate in September 1917. Tereshchenko was known to support the Ukrainian government that led to the establishment and recognition of the General Secretariat in Ukraine 1917.

On the night of 26 October, Mikhail Tereshchenko was arrested in the Winter Palace with other ministers of the Provisional Government and placed into the Peter and Paul Fortress while his office was temporarily held by Anatoly Neratov. In the spring of 1918, Tereshchenko escaped from prison and fled to Norway with the Tereshchenko Blue Diamond. Tereshchenko was one of the supporters of allied intervention in Soviet Russia. In 1920s and 1930s, he was engaged in financial activities in France and Madagascar.

== Personal life ==
Tereshchenko was an active member of the irregular freemasonic lodge, the Grand Orient of Russia’s Peoples. Along with Kerensky, Alexander Galpern, Yefremov, Kolyubakin and Nekrasov, he was a member of the lodge "La Petite Ourse" (Ursa Minor), which was founded in 1910 in St. Petersburg. This lodge was considered the coordinating lodge of the entire Grand Orient of Russia's Peoples.

Tereshchenko met Marguerite Noë in Monaco. Their first son was born in 1913. For the occasion, he commissioned all stone dealers to find the most unique and most beautiful stone for the mother of his child. He bought the Tereshchenko Diamond, secretly smuggled from India, for a hefty sum. A theory carries the belief that the diamond (much like the Hope Diamond) is cursed and led to the 1917 demise of Mikhail Tereshchenko.

Political offices
Preceded by Pavel Miliukov	Foreign Minister of Russia; 5 May 1917 – 26? October 1917	Succeeded by Leon Trotsky
