= Surazhsky Uyezd =

Russian Empire Subdivision

Surazhsky Uyezd (Суражский уезд) was one of the subdivisions of the Chernigov Governorate of the Russian Empire. It was situated in the northern part of the governorate. Its administrative centre was Surazh.

== Demographics ==
At the time of the Russian Empire Census of 1897, Surazhsky Uyezd had a population of 186,297. Of these, 69.4% spoke Belarusian, 24.9% Russian, 5.3% Yiddish, 0.1% Ukrainian, 0.1% Polish and 0.1% German as their native language.
