= Varvara Khanenko =

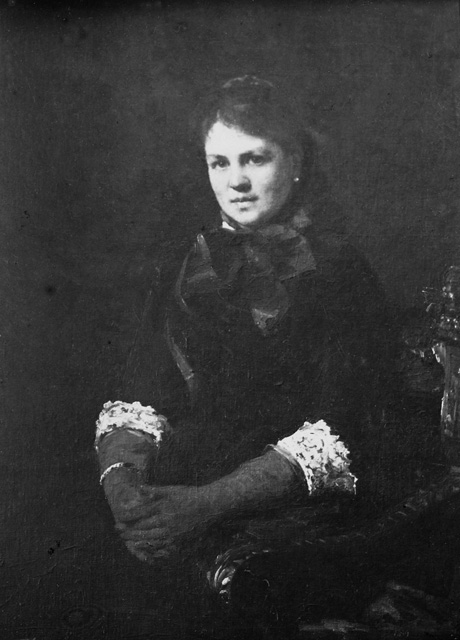
- Born: August 9, 1852; Hlukhiv
- Died: May 7, 1922; Kiev
- Known for: Tereshchenko dynasty collector, art patron
- Spouse: Bogdan Khanenko

Varvara Nikolovna Khanenko (née: Tereshchenko) (Russian: Варва́ра Никола́евна Хане́нко; Ukrainian: Варвара Ніколівна Ханенко) was the eldest daughter of the entrepreneur, sugar king, philanthropist and collector Nikola Tereshchenko. Home schooled, she was interested, like her father, in art. She was Bogdan Khanenko's wife.

== Biography ==
Varvara Khanenko was the owner of the unique collections: icons from different eras, that she collected throughout Russian Empire, Scythian gold accessories (some of them were made more than two thousand years ago). In 1904, at her estate in the village of Olenevka in Vasylkiv county of Kiev Governorate, Varvara Tereshchenko organized a craft school for the children. The masters' products were repeatedly presented at the exhibitions in Kiev and Saint Petersburg, where they were awarded with a gold medal. Varvara Khanenko was also elected as a chairwoman to the committee of the Kiev Art and Industry and Science Museum for organizing the first exhibition of south-Russian craftworks, held in 1906. In 1907, she became one of the initiators of formation and active member of the Kiev Handicraft Society. At the All-Russian Exhibition in Kiev in 1913, she organized a separate pavilion, where there were introduced products from six handicraft workshops, established and held by her. Together with her husband, she collected pieces of Western and Oriental art, after what the couple established a private museum. After the death of Bogdan Ivanovich in 1917, according to his will, the collections became a property of Varvara Nikolovna, and after her death, it had to pass the ownership to Kiev for organizing a public museum. Varvara Nikolovna had to streamline collection and prepare it for conversion into a museum. And the most important task was to keep the collection during the extremely difficult times.

=== World War I and Russian Revolution ===
Because of the World War I and coming Russian Revolution, Varvara Khanenko decided to evacuate a large part of their collection from Kiev to Moscow, to the Historical Museum. During the Russian Revolution, Varvara Khanenko remained in Kiev, she refused to leave and decided to protect her property and collections. In 1921, she achieved the return of the collection back to Kiev. However, three dozen paintings disappeared completely, her flat in Saint Petersburg was robbed, where she kept the beautiful works of art. Another one elegant palazzo on 15 Tereschenkivska Street, where she kept her property and collections were also requisitioned, and Varvara was forced to live in complete isolation right over her own treasures. Varvara Nikolovna refused the offer to move to Germany and open there a museum on privileged conditions. She appealed to the National Academy of Sciences of Ukraine to accept from her as a gift all of her art collections and treasures, but under the Bogdan Ivanovich conditions: a collection must be called a "Museum of Bogdan Ivanovich and Varvara Nikolovna Khanenko". However, the communist scientific committee of that time, had asked the Academy "to find more suitable person for the name of the former museum of Khanenko, due to lack of a merit by Khanenkos to the revolution events". Eventually, a compromised name was approved - the Art Museum of Ukrainian Academy of Sciences of the B.I. and V.N. Khanenko.

== Charity activities ==
The Khanenko palace on 15 Tereshchenkivska Street, in Kiev, was donated by the Khanenko family to the Ukrainian nation as a monument, public museum and a house of arts, collections of which, were made by the same Khanenkos for the future generations of Ukraine as an art and history education.
