= Artemy Tereshchenko =

- Артемий Терещенко
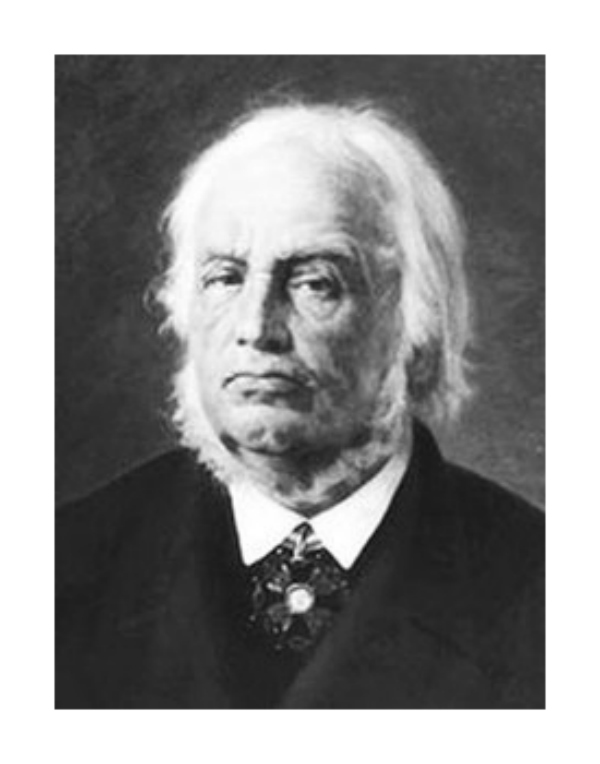
- Born: 1794; Lokot, Oryol Governorate, Russian Empire
- Died: 1873 (aged 78–79); Hlukhiv, Chernigov Governorate, Russian Empire
- Occupation: Sugar manufacturer
- Known for: Tereshchenko dynasty
- Spouse: Euphrosyne Steslyavskaya
- Children: Nikola, Fyodor, Bassie, Simon

Artemy Yakovlevich Tereshchenko (Russian: Арте́мий Я́ковлевич Тере́щенко; Ukrainian: Арте́м Я́кович Тере́щенко, Artem Yakovych Tereshchenko; 1794 – 1873) was the first entrepreneur in the Tereshchenko family and the founder of the Tereshchenko dynasty, one of the wealthiest families in the world. Nicknamed "Karbovanets", he was a guild merchant, a hereditary honorary citizen, a hereditary nobleman, and Burgermeister of Hlukhiv City from 1842 to 1845. He established the production of the sugar beet in Ukraine and funded charitable works.

== Biography ==
=== Early career ===
Artemy Tereshchenko stemmed from a Cossack family of Sloboda Ukraine. Born in modern-day Bryansk Oblast, as a youth he moved to Hlukhiv, where he worked as a shop assistant. After earning his first capital, he became a petty street trader. In 1815, at the age of 21, Tereshchenko was drafted into the army and deployed to contest the Napoleonic invasion of Russia, finally ending up in Paris. His regiment was ordered to stay in apartments outside the French capital. For a few months, Tereshchenko and his fellow Cossacks lived near the town of Beauvais, where the fertile soil of the Bree valley produced beets just like those of his Ukrainian homeland. Tereshchenko took advantage of his stay by studying French.

At this time, a blockade by the United Kingdom hindered the delivery of sugarcane from the Antilles to France, so Napoleon began producing sugar from beets as a workaround. Northern France, in particular, was a center of production. Tereshchenko became friends with a group of young scientists who had worked on producing sugar from beets at the University of Beauvais under the leadership of Jean-Say Basta. Tereshchenko realized that if he could introduce sugar beet production in Ukraine, it might help reduce hunger in the region.

In 1816, the Grande Armée was finally defeated and Tereshchenko's regiment was sent home.

=== Birth of the Dynasty ===
Shortly after arriving home, Tereshchenko met and proposed to Euphrosyne Gregorievna Steslyavskaya. They were married on January 15, 1819. Their first son, Nikola, was born on October 14, 1819. They had two more sons and all three eventually joined him in the family business. Together with Nikola, Tereshchenko organized the supplies of salt, grain and fish from Crimea, reviving the old chumak trade.

The Tereshchenkos utilized trade credits, offering a good price to product manufacturers who came to sell at the local fair in exchange for deferred payment until the return of the convoy. Since these transactions required a high amount of trust, and since the Tereshchenkos were reputed to always keep their word, the surname Tereshchenko became known throughout the Russian Empire as a synonym for "guarantor" among sellers and buyers.

=== Crimean War and aftermath ===
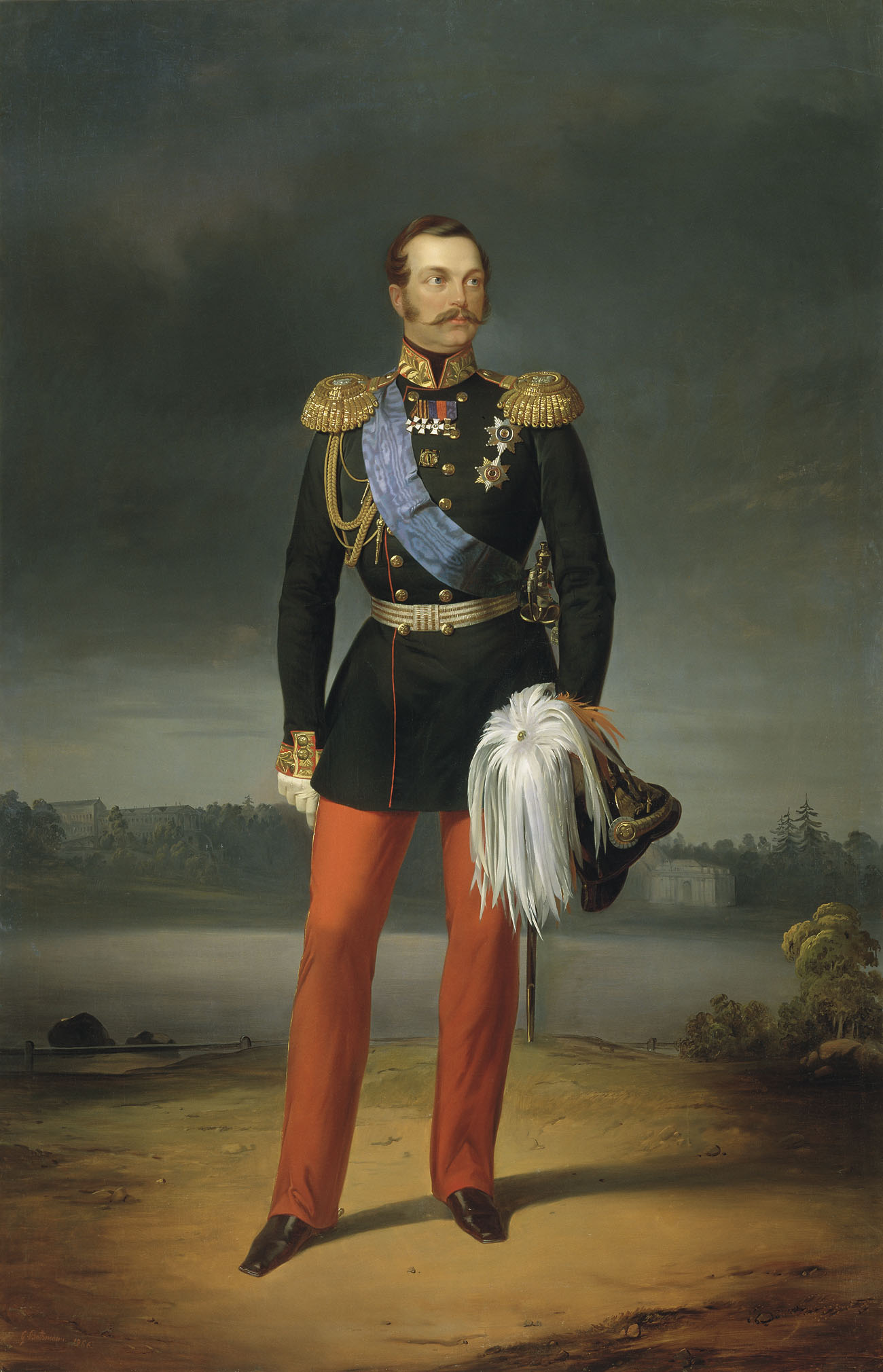
Alexander II by E.Botman (1856, Russian museum)

In 1853, the Crimean War began. Emperor Nikolai I was faced with maintaining the expedition corps of the Russian army in the difficult conditions of the Crimean peninsula, which was in the hands of the sultan. As he knew Tereshchenko to be an old soldier who was familiar with the area, the Tsar instructed him to supply the Crimean contingent of the Russian troops with bread and firewood. For three years, including during the difficult days of the Siege of Sevastopol, Tereshchenko kept the supplies coming.

Using huge profits earned during the war, the Tereshchenkos invested his capital in purchase of land and construction of sugar factories. Following the abolition of serfdom, they acquired properties of numerous aristocrats, who couldn't compete in the new circumstances. In 1872 the Tereshchenko Brothers Society of Sugar and Raffinade Factories was established.

In 1870 Artemy Tereshchenko was ennobled according to a personal decree of emperor Alexander II. According to the act, the family received its own coat of arms depicting two lions, two golden coins and three ears of grain, symbolizing the family's contribution to the development of agriculture.

== Charity work ==
Tereshchenko funded the construction of a vocational school, male and female gymnasiums, a pedagogical institute, a bank, the free hospital of St. Euphrosyne, an orphanage, and Three Anastasias Cathedral.

== Honors and awards ==
Tereshchenko became a guild merchant. Emperor Alexander II of Russia issued a royal decree on 12 May, 1870, by which, for special services and charitable activities, Tereshchenko and all his offspring of the male line were made hereditary nobility of the Russian Empire. He was also awarded a gold medal by the Holy Synod.
