= Ivan Tereshchenko =

Russian industrialist and art collector (1854 – 1903)

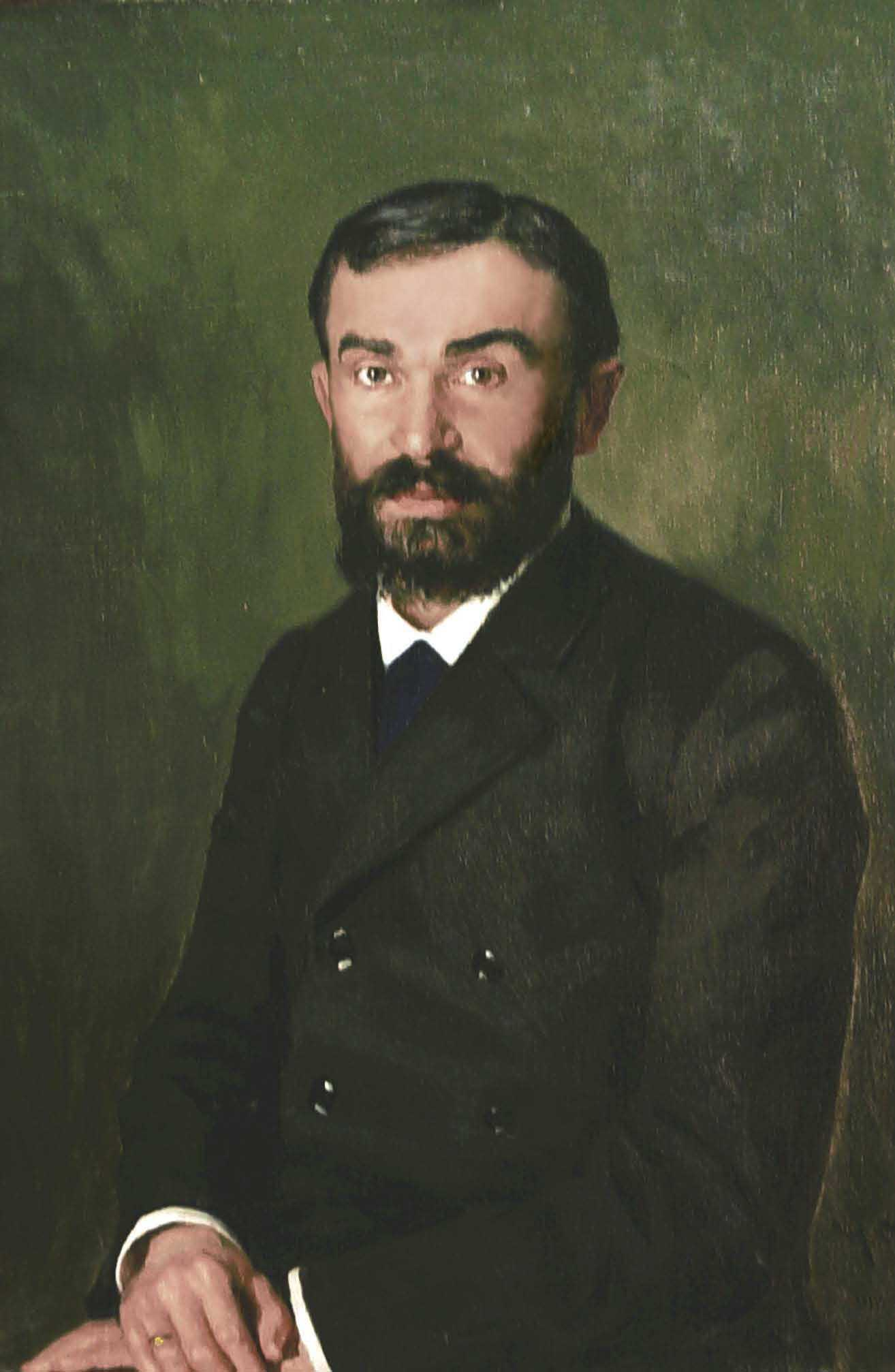
- Born: September 10, 1854; Hlukhiv, Russian Empire (now Ukraine)
- Died: February 11, 1903 (aged 48); Cannes, France
- Resting place: Iskryskivshchyna, Sumy, Ukraine
- Known for: Collector, patron of the arts, member of the Tereshchenko family
- Spouse: Elizabeth Sarancheva
- Children: Mikhail Tereshchenko, Nikola, Pelageya, Elizabeta, Darya

Ivan Nikolaevich Tereshchenko (Russian: Иван Никола́евич Тере́щенко; Ukrainian: Іван Миколайович Терещенко; September 10, 1854 – February 11, 1903) was a Ukrainian landowner, industrialist (sugar manufacturer), art collector and patron of the arts of Ukrainian Cossack origin. He was renowned for his numerous art collections across Europe.

== Early life ==
Ivan was the eldest son of landowner and sugar manufacturer Nikola Tereshchenko and his wife Pelageya. From 1883 to 1891, Tereshchenko worked in the Kiev city council. He was a co-founder of the Sugar Refinery Factories' Association of the Tereshchenko Brothers.

In 1897, he decided to build a villa on the French Riviera, on the hills above Cannes. The rapid economic growth of Russia in the late 19th-century, as well as friendly relations between Russia and France, allowed many wealthy Russian industrialists to settle on the Côte d'Azur. At that time, the Russian Navy had leased the French Bay of Villefranche-sur-Mer over a number of years.

The Tereshchenkos, father Nikola (1819–1903), Ivan himself, and his younger brother Aleksandr, were well-known patrons of the arts; Nikola was a financial supporter of the Kiev and Glukhov art museums, and Ivan supported the Kiev Drawing School.

Together with his younger brother, Alexander, Ivan Tereshchenko studied at the Kreyman gymnasium in Moscow, after which he enrolled at the St. Vladimir Imperial University of Kiev, from where he graduated with a degree in law. He briefly served as a cornet at the Grodno Hussars Life Guards. During his years of military service, he became close friends with Vasily Vereshchagin, the official artist of the Russian army.

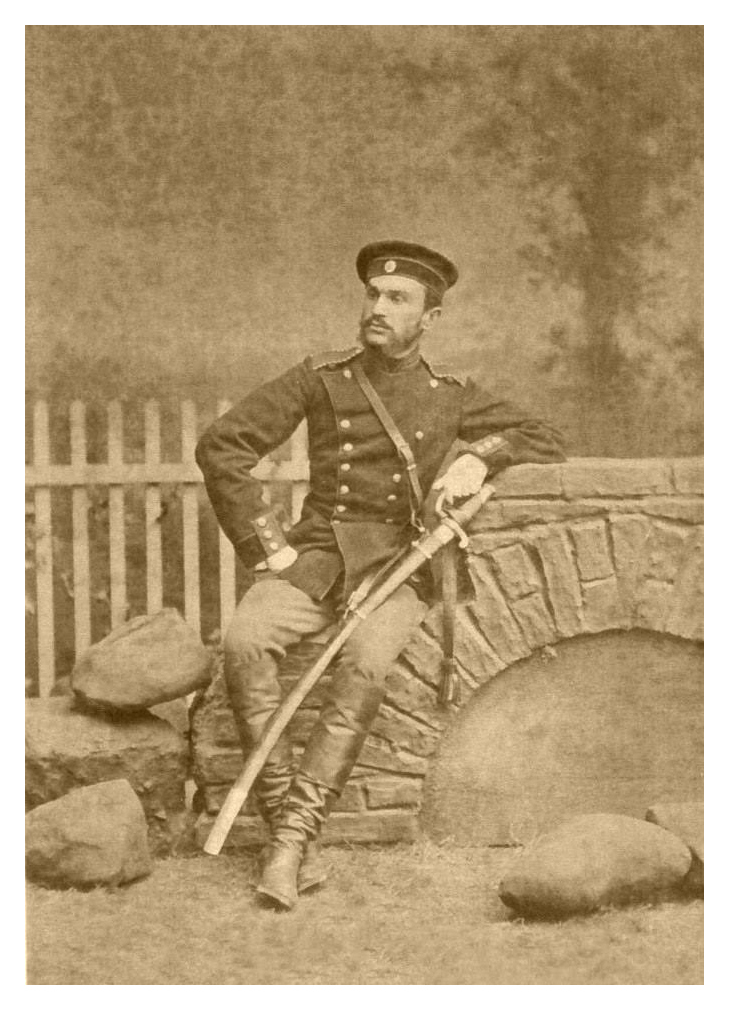
Ivan Tereshchenko as a Cornet of the Life Guards regiment of Grodno, 1880.

== Collections ==
Ivan was a connoisseur and collector of art, for which he became well known throughout the Russian Empire, devoting his life to his collection and patronage. The first paintings purchased by Ivan Nikolaevich were the Vereshchagin works depicting battle scenes.

One of these battlefield paintings, the "Winners 1878-1879," was a scene from the Russo-Turkish War (1877–78). The work depicted victorious Turkish soldiers removing the boots and uniforms from the corpses of Russian mercenaries who had fought on the side of Serbia, leaving the dead and wounded at the mercy of birds of prey. This painting, exhibited in St. Petersburg, shocked Russian civilians and stirred up national pride, following which Emperor Alexander II of Russia declared war on the Ottoman Empire. The battle paintings became the first masterpieces he acquired. His collection also reflected his fondness for Art Nouveau.

== Philanthropy ==
In May 1876, painter and art teacher Mykola Murashko asked Ivan for funding for his new art school. This led Tereshchenko to become a patron of the Murashko school for nearly 25 years. During the period, he was also appointed as honorary trustee of the Kiev and Alexander craft schools.

== Personal life ==
Ivan married Elizaveta Sarancheva, the daughter of Colonel Saranchev. History states that when he asked Elizabeth to marry him, her father declared that they would not get married until after the first snowfall. The next morning Ivan arranged for the whole street leading to the bride's house to be covered with sugar. Ivan's father, however, was not impressed by this ruse, and in April 1880, at the insistence of his father, Ivan resigned and went to Europe to collect art. By the turn of the century, they owned approximately 153,000 ha and were among the largest landowners in the Russian Empire.

== Death ==
Ivan Tereshchenko is buried next to his daughter Olga, who was born in 1882 and died in childhood. They are buried in the Tereshchenko family's estate, where an angel crafted in white marble watches over Olga's grave.
