= National State Historical and Cultural Reserve "Hlukhiv" =

Hlukhiv Historical and Cultural Reserve
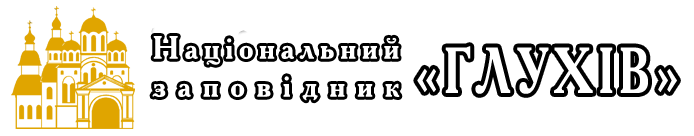
- Interactive map of Hlukhiv Historical and Cultural Reserve
- Location: 30 Shevchenka Street, Hlukhiv (Sumy Oblast)
- Area: 75 ha (190 acres)
- Established: 1994

The Hlukhiv National Reserve (Ukrainian: Національний державний історико-культурний заповідник «Глухів») is a historical and cultural reserve established in 1994 in Sumy Oblast, Ukraine to preserve and sustainably use the cultural monuments of Hlukhiv.

== History ==
The Hlukhiv National Reserve is a scientific research and cultural-educational institution that ensures the study, protection, restoration, and use of the city's historical and cultural heritage. It conducts archaeological research, publishing, and exhibition activities. The reserve was established in 1994 (State Historical and Cultural Reserve "Hlukhiv"), but it began active operations only at the end of 1998. In the early 21st century, all reserve objects were restored. According to the Decree of the President of Ukraine dated 10 November 2008, No. 1027/2008, the reserve was granted national status.

== Monuments of the Reserve ==
The reserve's register includes 50 objects of architectural, historical, and cultural value. Of these, 36 are monuments of architecture and urban planning: 5 of national significance and 31 of local significance. Most objects are located on the territory of the former Hlukhiv fortified settlement (central part of the city). The reserve includes:

The Noble Assembly Building, housing the city local history museum, a monument of 19th century architecture (1811);

Kyiv Gate, a monument of history, architecture, and urban planning of the 18th century (1766–1769);

St. Nicholas Church, a monument of history and architecture of national significance from the 17th century (1693–1695). The oldest architectural monument in Hlukhiv, created by master M. Yefimov. During the Hetmanate period, the Radnyi Square near the church was used for electing hetmans and resolving state matters;

Three Anastasias Church (1884–1897), built with the support of local philanthropists, brothers M. L. and F. A. Tereshchenko, currently the largest church in Hlukhiv;

Central Building of Hlukhiv National Pedagogical University, constructed in 1874;

Water Pumping Tower, a monument of local significance (1927–1928);

Transfiguration Church, a masonry church built in 1765 to replace a wooden one that burned down in a fire in 1748. It was declared an architectural monument in 1979;

Ascension Church, built in 1767 by architect A. V. Kvasov and rebuilt in 1811;

P. Lyutyi House, a monument of late 19th century architecture;

Bank Building of M. Tereshchenko, a significant historical and architectural monument of masonry civil architecture in Hlukhiv from the late 18th century;

"Old" Building of Hlukhiv College, built with funds from the Tereshchenko family in 1899;

"Prison Castle", constructed in the early 17th century;

Kochubey family Estate House built in 1904;

House of A. Y. Tereshchenko, 1870s;

Three-Class City School of F. Tereshchenko, built in 1903.

== Sources ==
Zhukova S. P. Cultural Heritage Monuments in the Structure of Activities of the Hlukhiv National Reserve / S. P. Zhukova // Protection of Cultural Heritage by Historical and Cultural Reserves of Chernihiv-Sivershchyna / ed. S. Yu. Zozulya. — Kyiv: Publisher Oleh Filiuk, 2017. — pp. 60–74: color photos. — Bibliography: pp. 113–116 (46 titles). — ISBN 978-611-01-0873-7
