= Siege of Hlukhiv =

1664 siege

- Part of the Russo–Polish War (1654–1667) and The Ruin
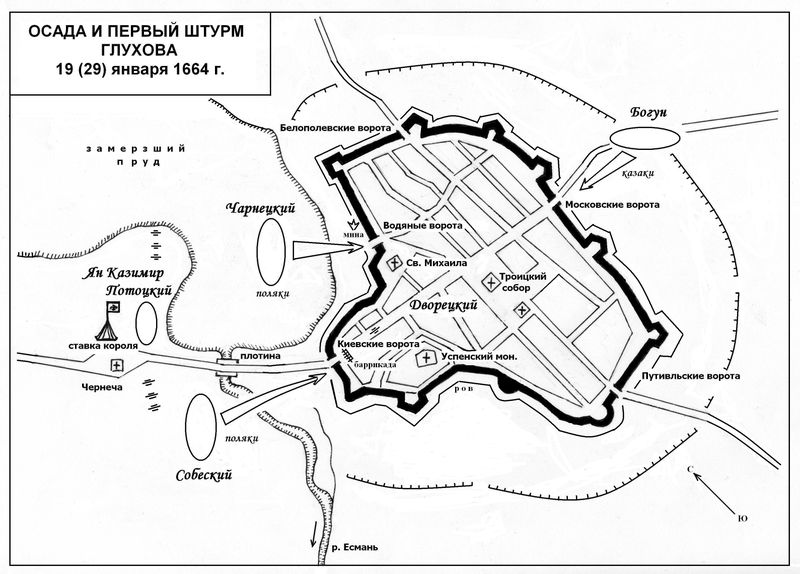
- Diagram of the siege and first assault on Hlukhiv
Date	22 January – 9 February 1664
Location	Hlukhiv, Hlukhiv Regiment, Cossack Hetmanate
Result	Cossack–Russian victory

Belligerents
Polish–Lithuanian Commonwealth; Crimean Khanate; Right Bank Cossacks	Tsardom of Russia; Cossack Hetmanate

Commanders and leaders
John II Casimir; John III Sobieski; Stefan Czarniecki; Stanisław Potocki Ivan Bohun (executed)	Grigory Romodanovsky; Vasyl Dvoretsky

Strength
Unknown	11,000 (Exaggerated Polish claims)

Casualties and losses
2,150 to 4,200 killed and wounded	Unknown

The siege of Hlukhiv (Ukrainian: Облога Глухова, Глухів, Russian: Осада Глухова, Глухов, Polish: Oblężenie Głuchowa, Głuchów; January 22 — 9 February 1664) was a battle of the Muscovite–Polish War (1654–1667). Near the site of the present-day city of Hlukhiv in Ukraine, the forces of the Polish King John II Casimir, numbering around 50,000–53,000 men, unsuccessfully besieged the Muscovite–Ukrainian Garrison of Hlukhiv and finally retreated under pressure from the Muscovite and Ukrainian Armies under the command of the Muscovite Prince Grigory Romodanovsky and the Ukrainian Hetman Ivan Briukhovetsky. The siege and the following retreat, during which the Crown Army and Crimean Tatars became the target of the Muscovite and Ukrainian attacks with around 45,000 men, proved to be one of the worst defeats in the whole course of war. The Polish King John II Casimir survived and was able to escape from the battlefield.

== Background ==
In November 1663, the Polish King John II Casimir and the Ukrainian Hetman of the Right-Bank of the Cossack Hetmanate, Pavlo Teteria, started an offensive against the Left-Bank of the Cossack Hetmanate with an army numbered around 130,000 men (including camp followers). Without sufficient forces to stop the offensive, the Muscovite Prince Grigory Romodanovsky and the Ukrainian Hetman of the Left-Bank of the Cossack Hetmanate Ivan Briukhovetsky retreated to Putyvl. Proceeding almost without resistance, a forces of the Polish King John II Casimir ultimately and unsuccessfully besieged Hlukhiv, which was defended by the Zaporozhian Cossacks under the command of Colonel Vasyl Dvoretsky and the Muscovite Strelets under the command of Avraam Lopukhin.

== Battle ==
With the help of the Polish–Lithuanian artillery and explosives the Crown Army managed to destroy some parts of the wall. Grand Duke John III Sobieski personally led the troops during the storming of the town. The Poles and Lithuanians with the Crimean Tatars entered the town, but blundered into an ambush and came under heavy artillery and musket fire of the Zaporozhian Cossacks. Having casualties and losses numbered about 4,000–4,200 men, including 200 officers, a forces of the Polish–Lithuanian Commonwealth was forced to retreat. The French Duke Antoine III de Gramont, who at that time was an officer in the Crown Army of the Polish King John II Casimir, reported that the small Muscovite–Ukrainian Garrison showed miraculous bravery and excellent artillery skills.

Eight days later, on 30 January 1664, the Polish King John II Casimir ordered a repeat of the storming. The Crown Army once again managed to penetrate the fortress, but the counterattack of the Muscovite and Cossack Garrison drove the attackers out of it. The French Duke Antoine III de Gramont describes the storming as almost successful but once again expresses his surprise how the Muscovite and Ukrainian recaptured the openings in the walls and how efficiently they fired back in spite of heavy Polish–Lithuanian artillery fire aimed at them. The Crown Army again experienced heavy casualties and losses.

Meanwhile, the Muscovite Prince Grigory Romodanovsky and the Cossack's Hetman Ivan Briukhovetsky arrives at Hlukhiv with their forces numbered around 45,000 Muscovite and Ukrainian troops. Simultaneously, many cities of the Left-Bank of the Cossack Hetmanate, which had previously surrendered without fighting, rebelled against the Polish-Lithuanian Commonwealth's occupation. The rebellions also spread into the Right-Bank of the Cossack Hetmanate. Wishing to avoid a great battle, which the Polish King John II Casimir has lost, he lifted the siege.

== Retreat of the Crown Army ==
Pursued by the Muscovite and Ukrainian forces led by the Muscovite Prince Grigory Romodanovsky and the Ukrainian Hetman Ivan Briukhovetsky, the Crown Army, led by the Polish King John III Casimir, retreated to Novhorod-Siverskyi. During the retreat, the Poles and Lithuanians executed the Ukrainian Colonel Ivan Bohun, who was suspected of handing over important information to the Ukrainian Hlukhiv Garrison.

The Defense of Hlukhiv ruined the Polish–Lithuanian plans of bringing the Left-Bank of the Cossack Hetmanate back under the control of the Polish–Lithuanian Commonwealth. In the following years, the Polish–Lithuanian Commonwealth was afflicted with internal conflicts (Lubomirski's Rebellion) and active fighting on the Muscovite–Polish frontline came to an end. Finally, the Treaty of Andrusovo was signed in 1667, formally ending the armed conflict as a Muscovite victory.

== Literature ==
- Malov .А.В. Русско-польская война 1654-1667 гг. Москва, Цейхгауз, 2006. ISBN 5-94038-111-1.
- Babulin, Igor B. (2022). Московский поход короля Яна II Казимира 1663-1664 гг. [Moscow campaign of John II Casimir, 1663-1664]. Ratnoe delo (in Russian). Moscow: Russkie viyazi. ISBN 978-5-907245-74-7.
