= Narbutivka =

Rural locality in Sumy Oblast, Ukraine

Narbutivka Нарбутівка
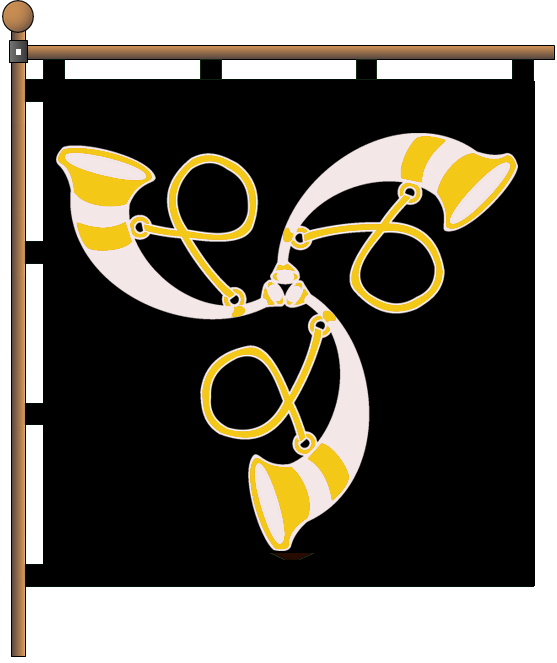
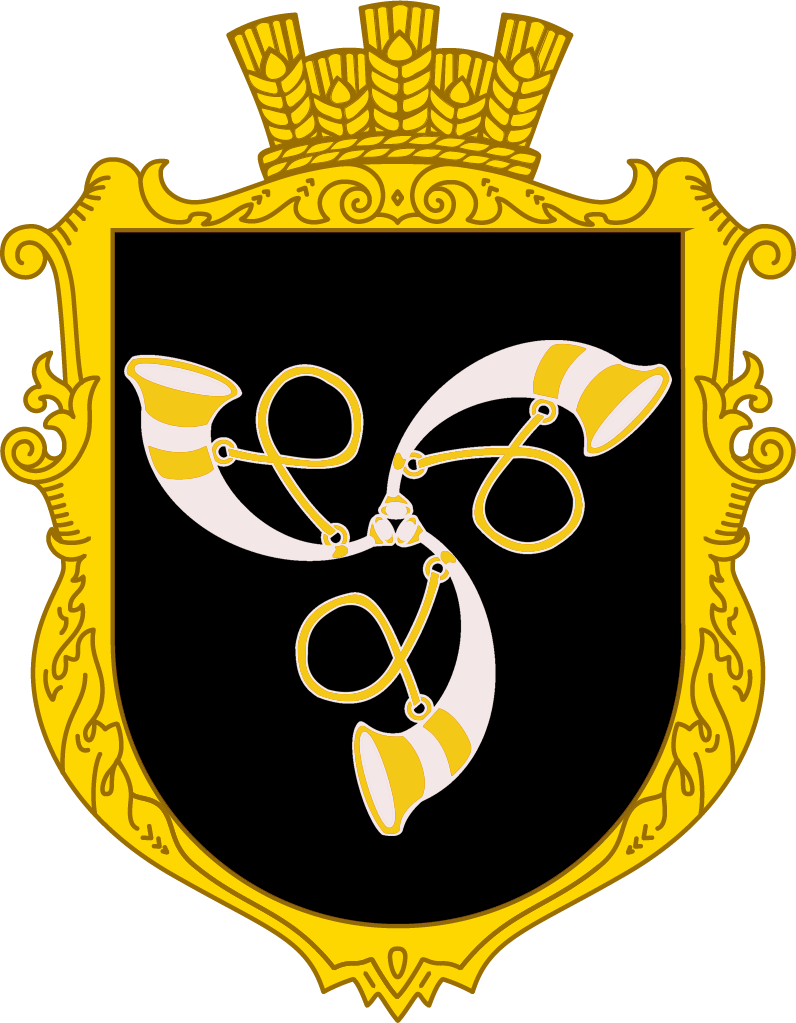
- Flag Coat of arms

- Location in Sumy Oblast Narbutivka (Sumy Oblast)
- Coordinates: 51°51′45″N 34°0′9″E
- Country: Ukraine
- Oblast: Sumy Oblast
- Raion: Shostka Raion
- Hromada: Bereza rural hromada
- Time zone: UTC+2 (EET)
  - Summer (DST): UTC+3 (EEST)
- Postal code: 41431

Narbutivka (Ukrainian: Нарбутівка) is a village in the Bereza rural hromada of the Shostka Raion of Sumy Oblast in Ukraine.

== History ==
On 19 July 2020, as a result of the administrative-territorial reform and liquidation of the Hlukhiv Raion, the village became part of the Shostka Raion.

== Notable residents ==
- Heorhii Narbut (1886–1920), Ukrainian graphic artist
- Volodymyr Narbut (1888–1938), Ukrainian poet
