= Heorhiy Narbut =

Ukrainian graphic designer (1886–1920)

- Георгій Нарбут
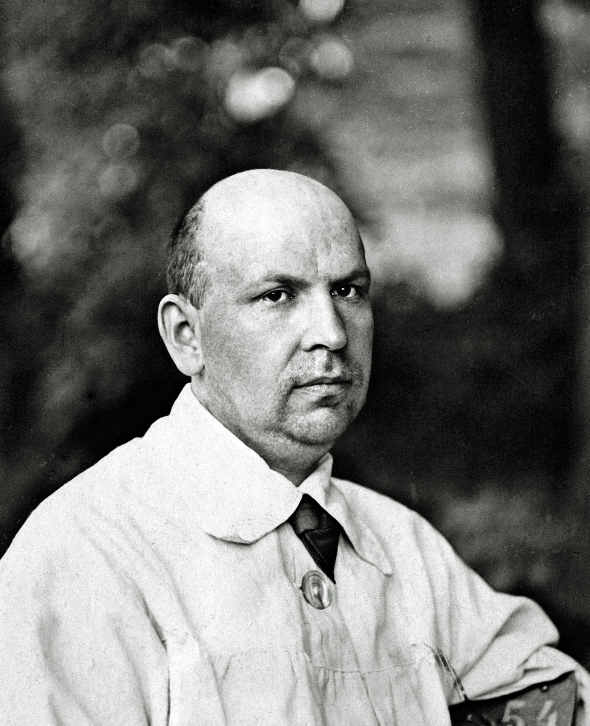
- Born: March 9, 1886; Narbutivka, Hlukhiv county, Chernigov Governorate, Russian Empire
- Died: May 23, 1920 (aged 34); Kyiv, Ukrainian People's Republic
- Education: School of Simon Hollósy
- Known for: Graphic design

Heorhiy Ivanovych Narbut (Ukrainian: Георгій Іванович Нарбут; 25 February [O.S. 13 February] 1886 – 23 May 1920), also known as Georgy Narbut or George Narbut, was a Ukrainian graphic artist.

He is known for designing the Ukrainian People's Republic's coat of arms, banknotes, postage stamps, charters, and for his many illustrations in books and magazines. He was a brother of the Acmeist poet Vladimir Narbut.

== Biography ==
Heorhiy Narbut was born in the village Narbutivka, Russian Empire (now Ukraine) not far off from Hlukhiv. His family had origins of ancient Lithuanian nobility. His first painting education was self-taught.

=== Saint Petersburg ===
At about age 20, Narbut settled in Saint Petersburg from 1906 to 1917. There he studied with painters Ivan Bilibin and Mstislav Dobuzhinsky. In 1909, Narbut continued some of his studies in Munich, in the school of Simon Hollósy. After his return to Saint Petersburg he joined the organization Mir iskusstva. In 1910-1912 Narbut was an illustrator of the fairy tales Hans Christian Andersen, the fables of Ivan Krylov, and folk tales.

=== Kyiv ===
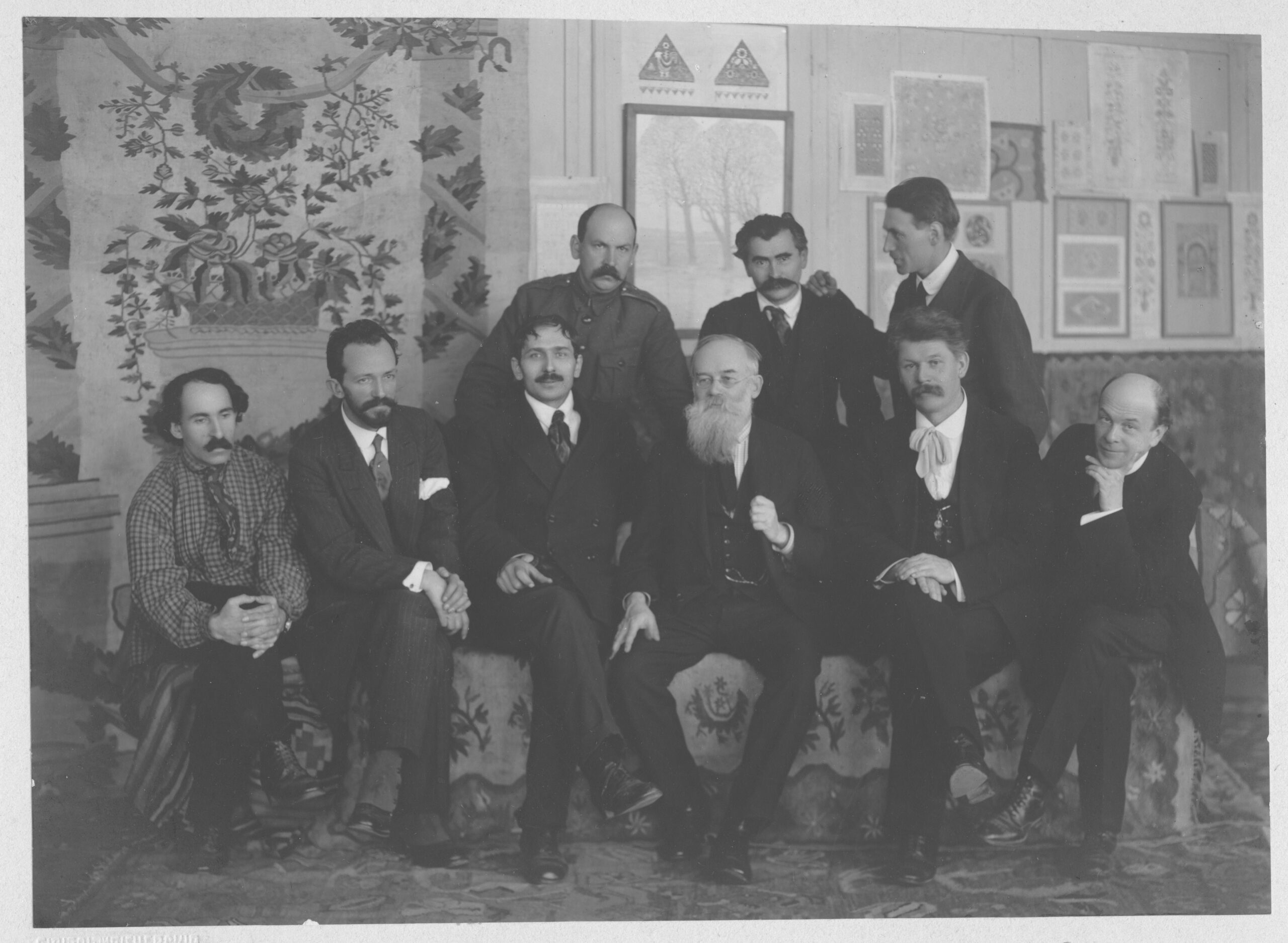
Founders of the Ukrainian academy of arts, 1917. From left, sitting: Abram Manevich, Oleksandr Murashko, Fedir Krychevsky, Mykhailo Hrushevsky, Ivan Steshenko, Mykola Burachek, standing: Heorhiy Narbut, Vasyl Krychevsky, Mykhailo Boychuk.

In March 1917, Narbut moved to Kyiv. In September 1917, he became professor and rector of the Ukrainian Academy of Arts. During this time he created his Ukrainian banknotes, postage stamps and charters for the newly created Ukrainian National Republic. Narbut also worked on the Ukrainian magazines: Nashe Mynule (Our past), Zori (Stars), and Sontse Truda (The Sun of Labor) among others. He died of typhus in 1920.

The dancer Marina Berezowsky (1914–2011) was his daughter. She became a major figure in ballet in Australia.

He also had a son, Danylo Narbut (1916-1998), artist.

== Works ==
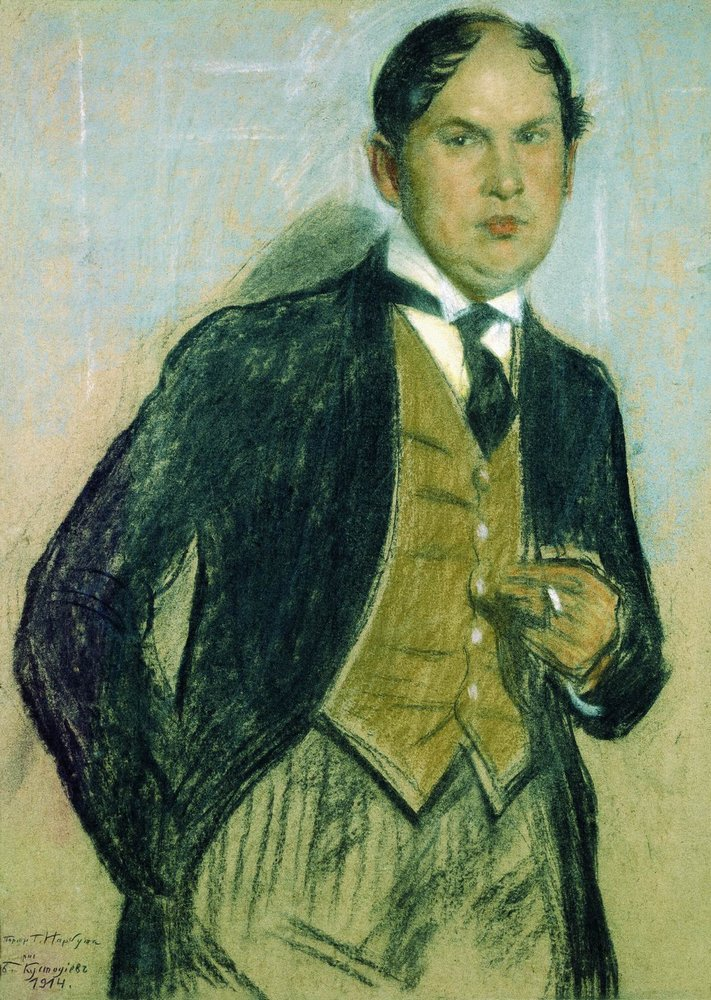
Picture by Russian artist Boris Kustodiev (1914)

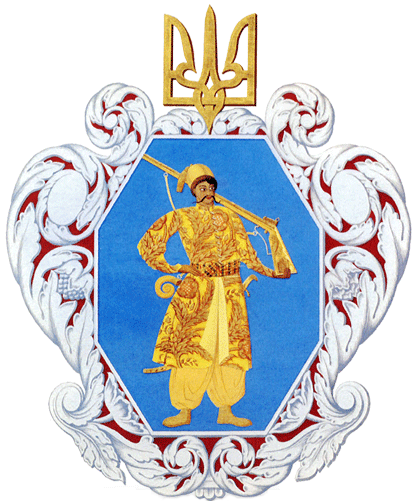
Project for seal of Ukrainian People's Republic, 1918

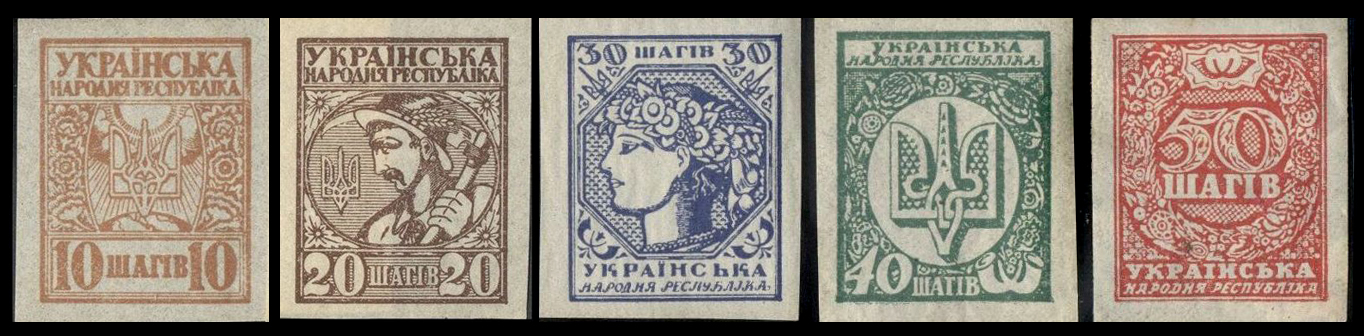
This 1918 issue of shahs was designed by graphic artists Anton Sereda and Heorhiy Narbut.

First definitive stamps of Ukraine (1992), after the drawing of Narbut

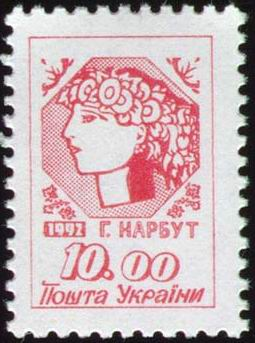
Series from May 16, Michel catalog, #80

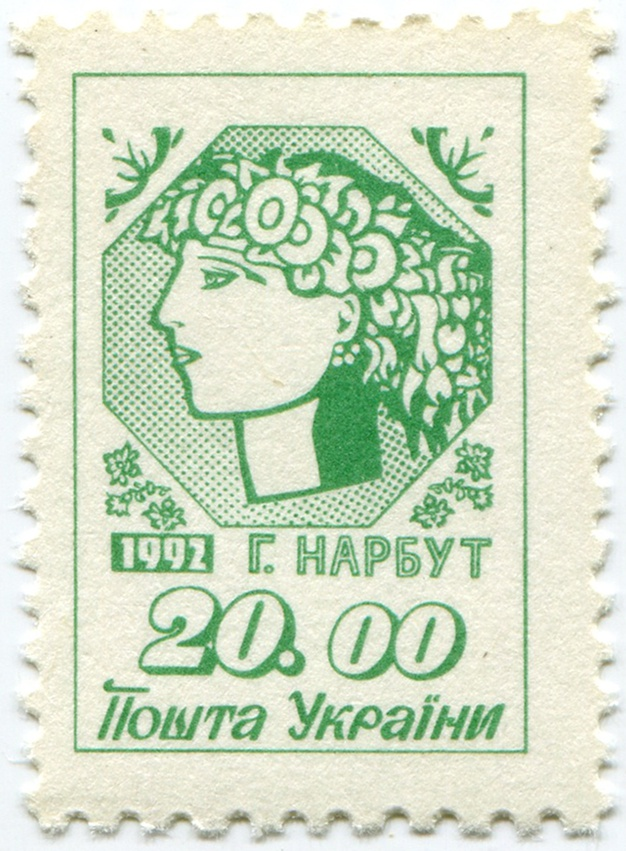
Same Michel catalog, #81

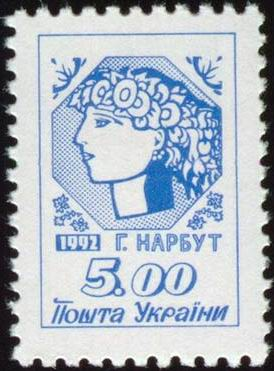
Same Michel catalog, #79

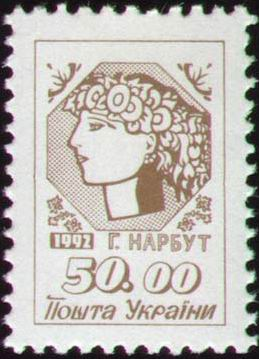
Same Michel catalog, #82

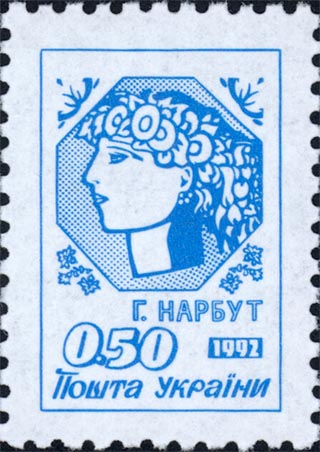
Series from June 17 Michel catalog, #75

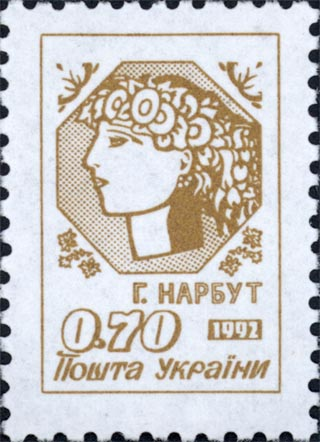
Same Michel catalog, #76

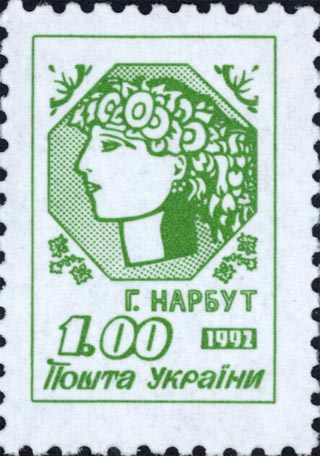
Same Michel catalog, #77

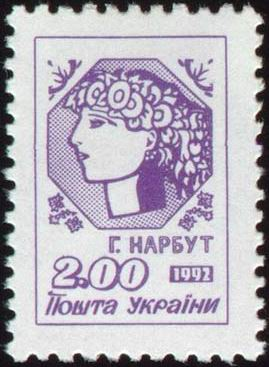
Same Michel catalog, #78
