= Hlukhiv =

City in Sumy Oblast, Ukraine

Hlukhiv Глухів
- City
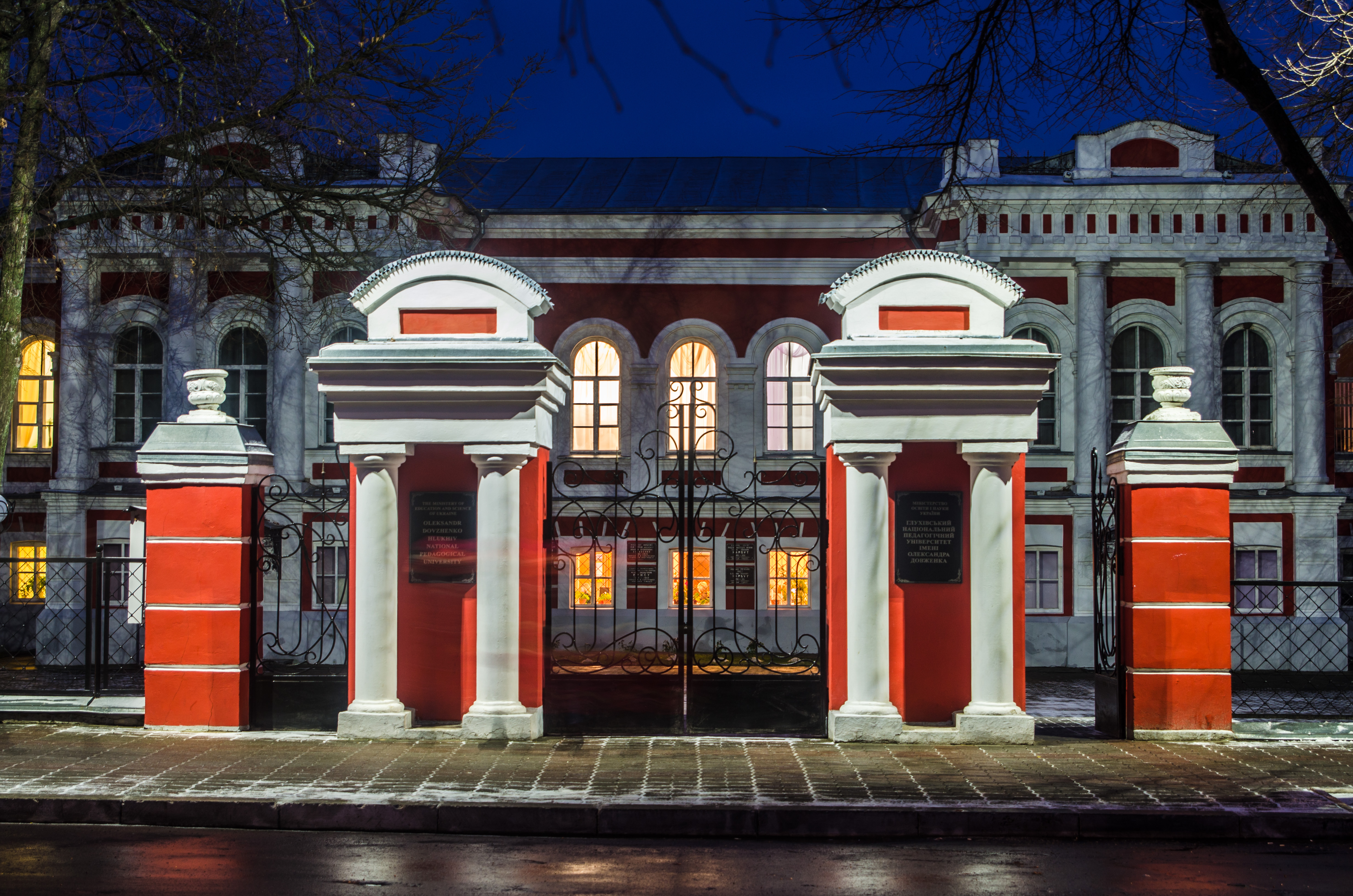
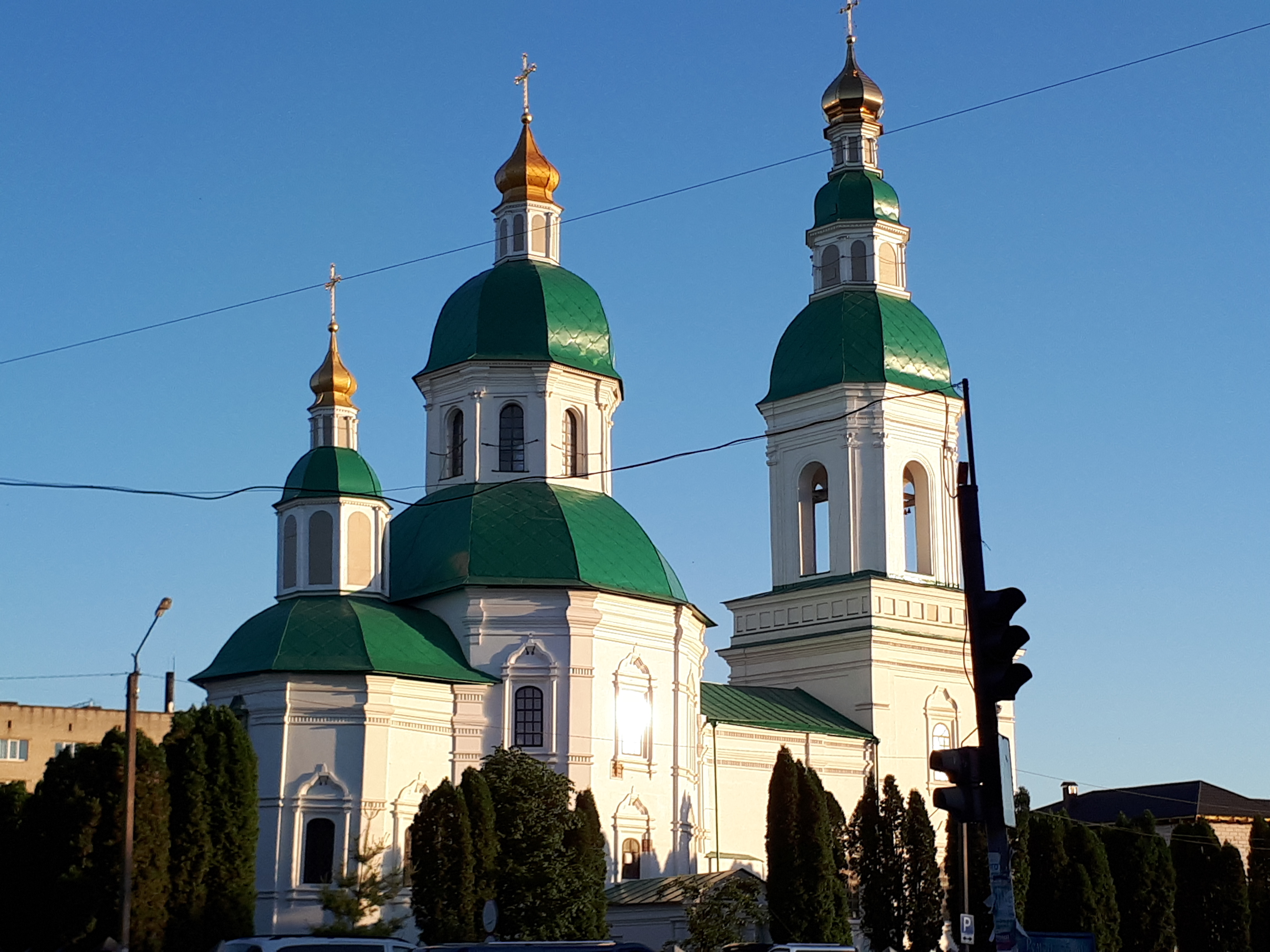
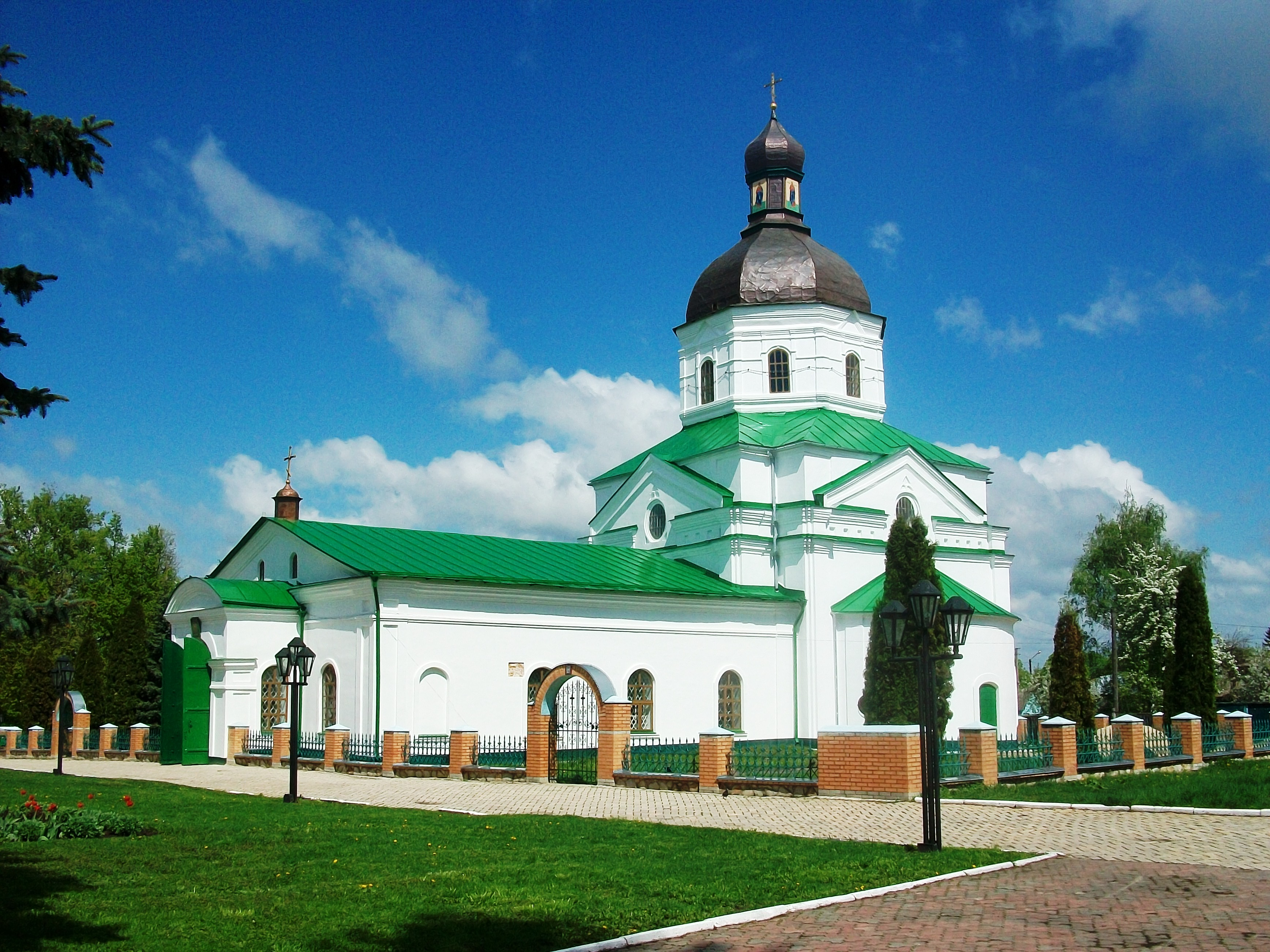
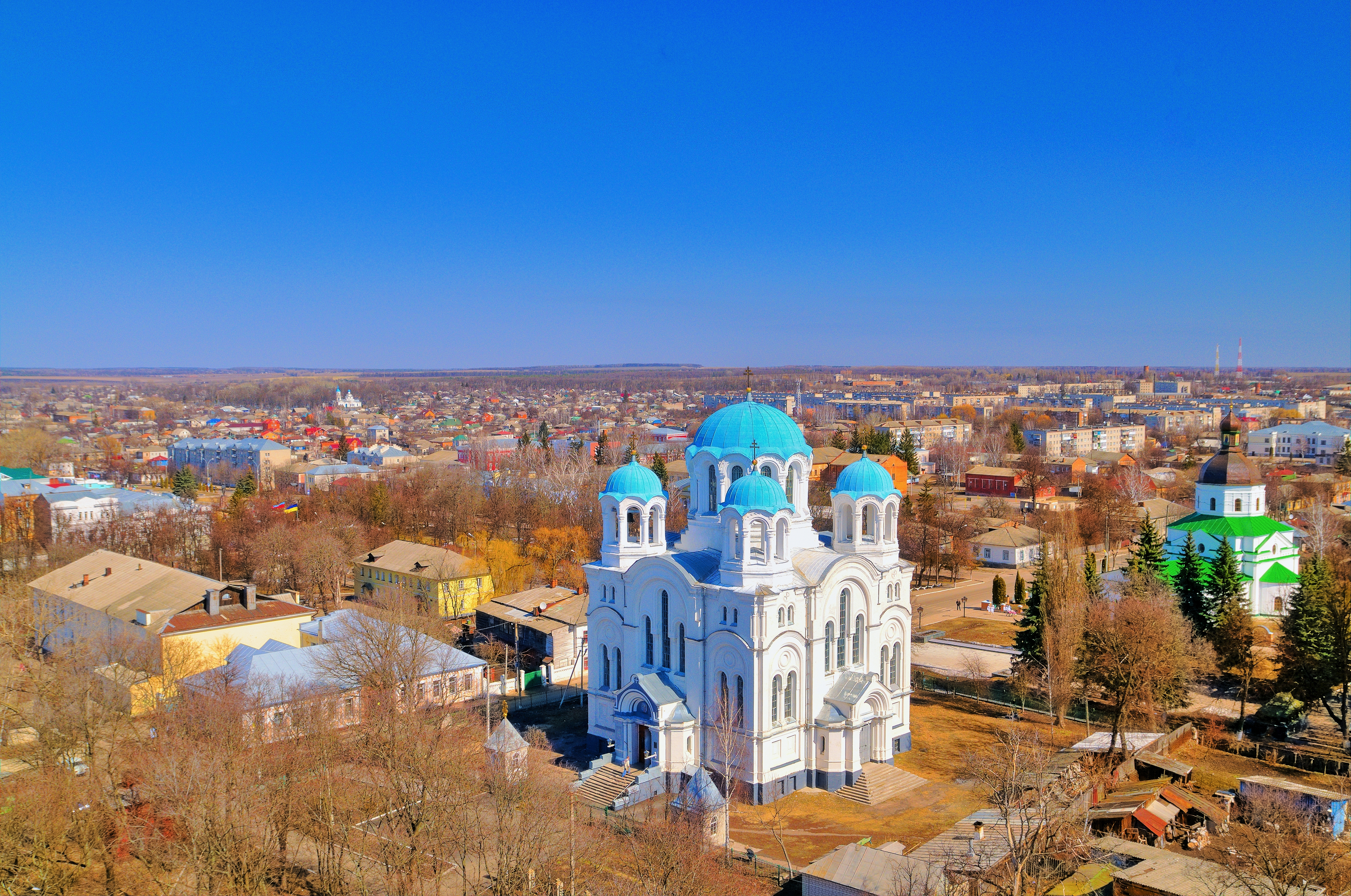
- Clockwise from top: Hlukhiv National Pedagogical University; Savior-Transfiguration Church; Three Anastasias Church; Saint Nicholas Church

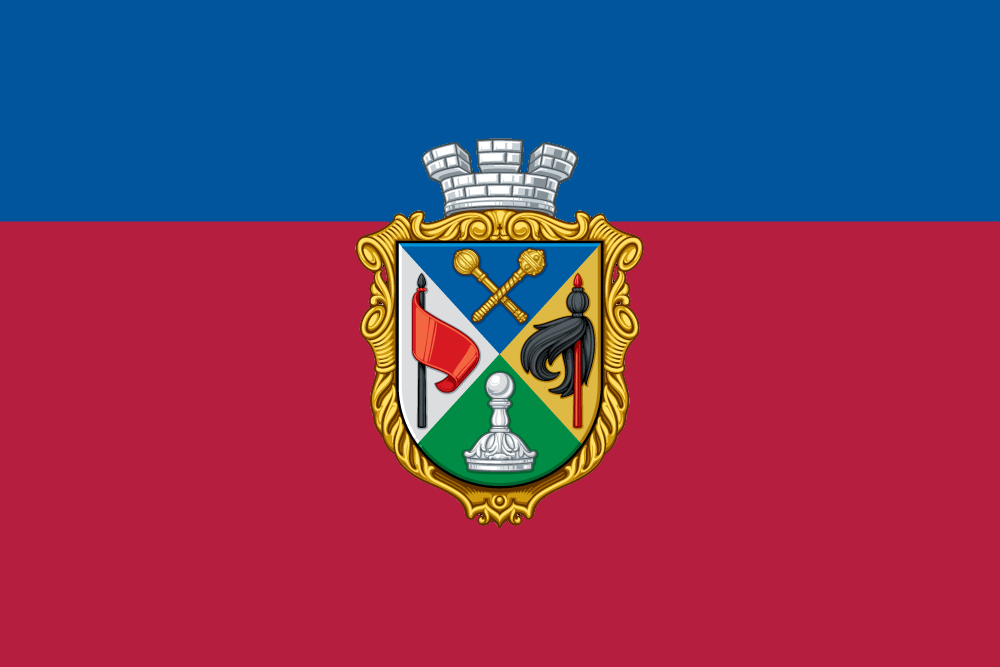
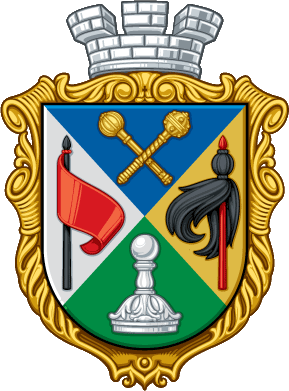
- Flag Coat of arms
- Interactive map of Hlukhiv
- Location within Sumy Oblast Location within Ukraine
- Coordinates: 51°40′29″N 33°54′48″E
- Country: Ukraine
- Oblast: Sumy Oblast
- Raion: Shostka Raion
- Hromada: Hlukhiv urban hromada
- First mentioned: 1152

Government
  - Mayor: Nadiia Vailo

Population (2022)
  - Total: 31,789
- Website: http://hlukhiv.com.ua/

Hlukhiv (Ukrainian: Глухів, IPA: [ˈɦluxiu̯]; Russian: Глухов, romanized: Glukhov) is a small historic city on the Esman River, a tributary of the Seym. It belongs to Shostka Raion of Sumy Oblast of Ukraine. Population: 31,789 (2022 estimate).

It is known for having served as the capital of the Cossack Hetmanate after the deposition of Ivan Mazepa in 1708–1764.

== History ==
=== Medieval and Early modern era ===
Hlukhiv was first noticed by chroniclers as a Severian town in 1152. Around 1247 it became the seat of a branch of the princely house of Chernihiv following the Mongol invasion of Rus. Between 1320 and 1503 it was part of the Grand Duchy of Lithuania before being conquered by the Grand Duchy of Moscow. In 1618 it became part of the Polish–Lithuanian Commonwealth (in the Czernihów Voivodeship of the Crown of Poland) and was granted Magdeburg Rights in 1644 by Władysław IV Vasa. In 1648–1764 it was part of the Cossack Hetmanate within the Nizhyn Regiment (province).

Coat of arms of Hlukhiv Regiment (1663–65), a province of the Cossack Hetmanate

In 1654 the Cossack Hetmanate came under military protectorate of the Tsardom of Russia in accordance with the Treaty of Pereiaslav and in 1664, during the siege of Hlukhiv, the Russo-Cossack garrison of the town successfully defended against a superiour Polish army which suffered great losses during the following retreat. According to the Truce of Andrusovo along with the rest Left-bank Ukraine it was ceded to the Tsardom of Muscovy in 1667. In 1669 Demian Mnohohrishny was elected hetman in Hlukhiv, concluding a treaty with the tsar's representatives, which significantly limited the Ukrainian autonomy.

In 1708, after realizing that Ivan Mazepa sided with Carl XII, Peter the Great ordered the destruction of Baturyn and the transfer of the Hetmanate's capital to Hlukhiv. Here in November 1708, Ivan Skoropadsky, a new Hetman of Zaporizhian Host, was elected, while the Metropolitan of Kyiv, Halych and all Little Russia Ioasaf was forced to proclaim anathema onto Mazepa in the St. Trinity Cathedral (destroyed in 1962). Hlukhiv served as the capital of the Cossack Hetmanate in 1708-64 and until 1773 the administrative center of the Little Russia Governorate. Under the last hetmans of Ukraine, the town was remodeled in the Baroque style. Subsequently, it declined in consequence of frequent fires, so that very few of its architectural gems survived.

=== Russian Empire ===
Following the Hetmanate's abolition, Hlukhiv became the seat of the Second Little Russian Collegium. In 1782 it became a povit centre of Novgorod-Seversky Viceroyalty, later being incorporated into the Chernigov Governorate.

In 1874, in a college was established in Hlukhiv (today Hlukhiv National Pedagogical University of Oleksandr Dovzhenko). In 1879, the Tereshchenko brothers, who were Russian millionaires of Ukrainian descent, established a free hospital of St. Euphrosyne and supported it financially. In 1899 on the funds of Tereshchenko family in Hlukhiv was established another college (today Agrarian college of the Sumy Agrarian University).

=== Modern era ===
In 1918, the city became part of Ukraine; however, already in January 1918 it was occupied by the Soviet troops for several months. Soviet control returned again to the city a year later in 1919.

During World War II, Hlukhiv was occupied by the German Army from 9 September 1941 to 30 August 1943.

While the region was a part of the Soviet Union, an airfield was built near Hlukhiv at Chervone-Pustohorod.

In 1994 the State Historical and Cultural Heritage Park was established in the city.

In October 2015 at the local election, the mayor of the city became Michel Tereshchenko, a naturalized Ukrainian from France and great grandson of Mikhail Tereshchenko. Tereshchenko stepped down as mayor in October 2018 with the intention to become a candidate in the 2019 Ukrainian presidential election. Yet, during the November–December 30 days martial law in Ukraine he resumed his position as mayor and on 3 January 2019 he declared his support for (another) presidential candidate Andriy Sadovyi during a congress of Sadovyi's party Self Reliance.

In the October 2020 Ukrainian local elections Nadiia Vailo, candidate from the political party "Our Land" was elected as the city's new mayor.

=== 2022 Russian invasion ===
Clashes occurred in Hlukhiv between the Ukrainian Armed Forces and the invading Russian Armed Forces in the city and its surrounding areas during the night of 24–25 February 2022. The city was occupied by Russian forces until April 2022.

== Demographics ==
Demographic Breakdown
	1897	1989	2001
Ukrainian	58.1%	81.5%	90.8%
Jewish	25.9%	0.4%	0.1%
Russian	15.0%	17.0%	8.4%
Poles	0.2%	0.0%	0.0%
Germans	0.2%	0.0%	0.0%
Belarusians	0.2%	0.4%	0.2%
Other		0.7%	0.5%
Total Population	14,828	35,869	35,244

== Sights ==
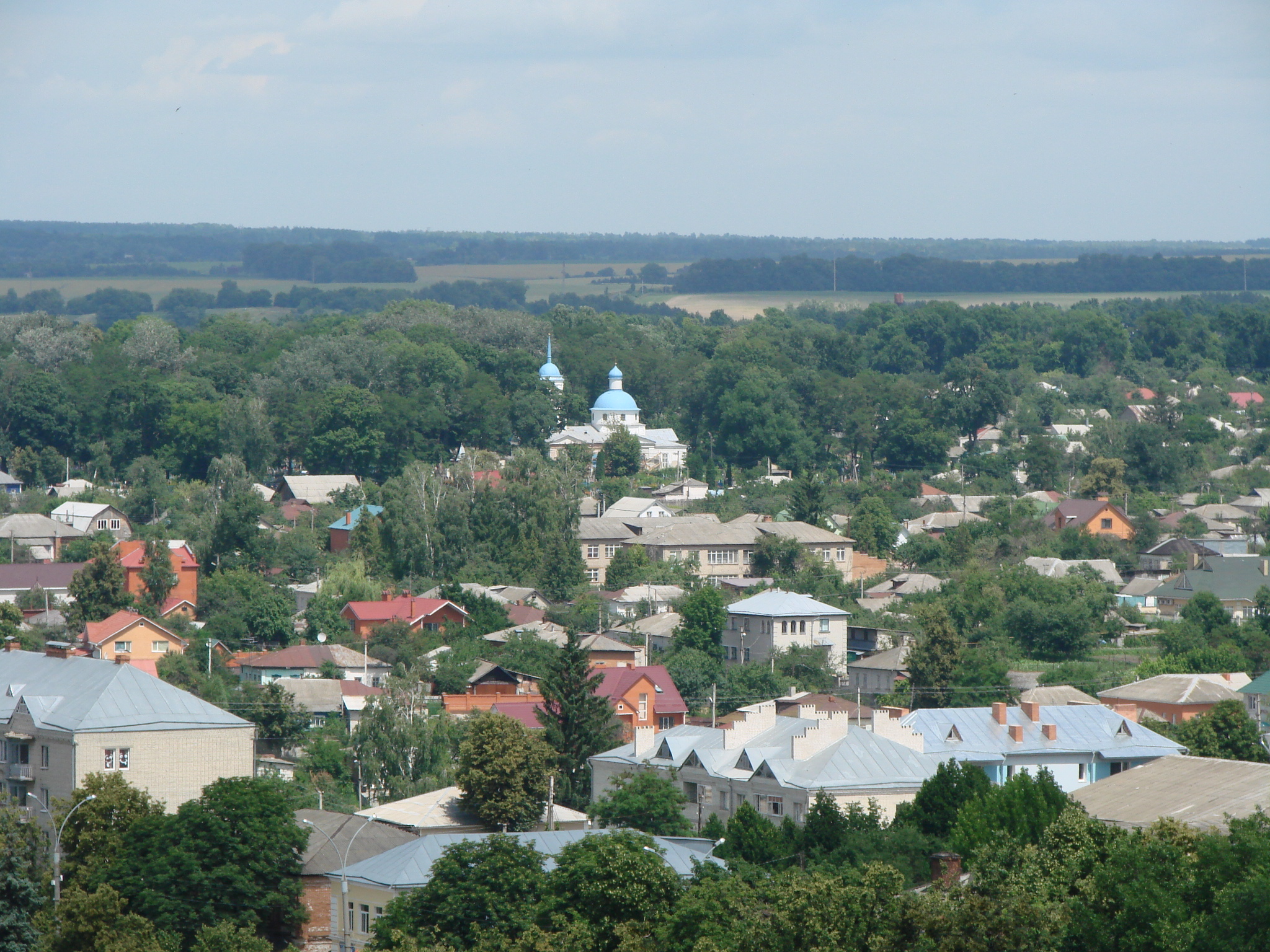
Skyline of Hlukhiv with the Ascension Church

The oldest building in the town is the church of St. Nicholas (1693), modeled after traditional wooden churches and executed in the Ukrainian Baroque style. The church, repaired and renovated in 1871, has three pear-shaped domes and a two-storey bell tower.

The church of the Savior's Transfiguration (1765) straddles the line between Baroque and Neoclassicism, while the massive Neo-Byzantine cathedral (1884–93) resembles St Volodymyr's Cathedral in Kyiv.

Probably the best known landmark of modern Hlukhiv is the conspicuous water tower (1927–29), though more historical interest attaches to the triumphal arch, dated either to 1744 or 1766. It has been suggested that the architect of this rather plain structure was Andrey Kvasov. The arch, the oldest in Ukraine, sustained damage during World War II but was subsequently restored.

Many of Hlukhiv's historic and architectural monuments are part of National State Historical and Cultural Reserve "Hlukhiv".

== Culture and religion ==
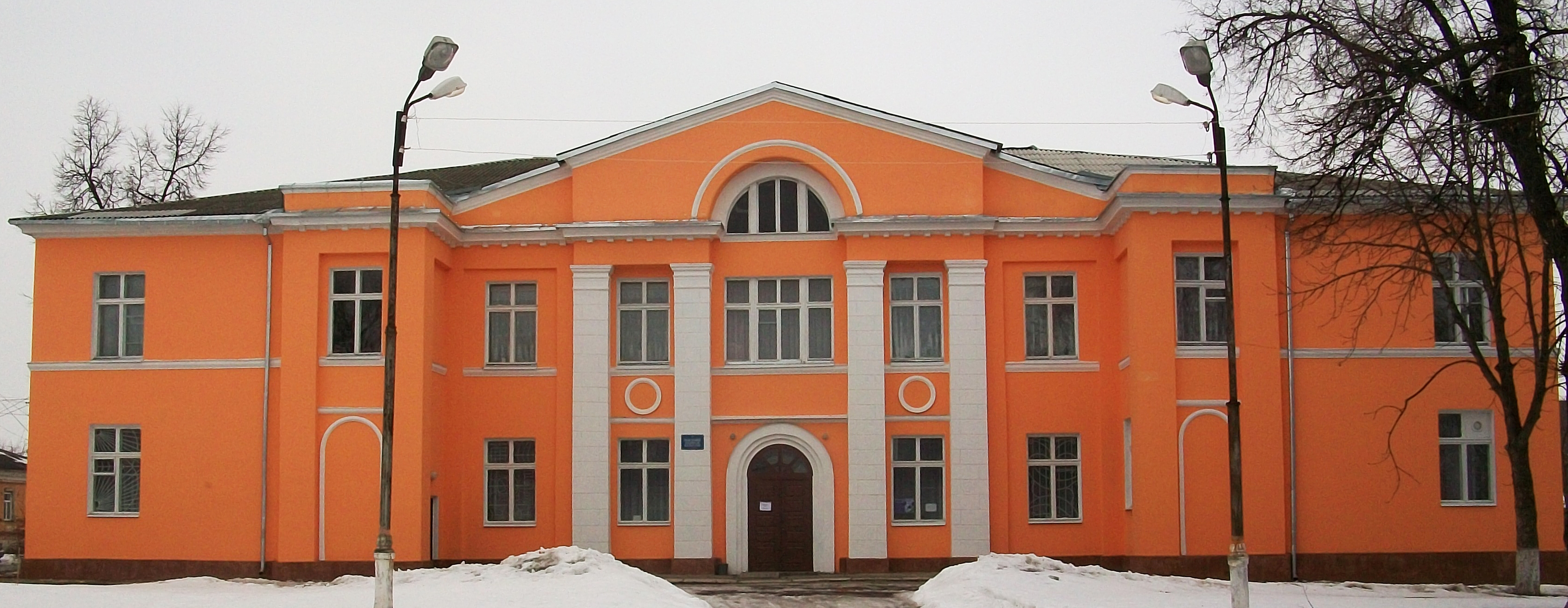
Hlukhiv District House of Culture

Since the first school of singing in the Russian Empire was established there in 1730, the town has had a rich musical heritage. Composers Dmytro Bortniansky and Maksym Berezovsky, whose statues grace the Bortniansky Square of Hlukhiv, are believed to have studied there.

The most dominant religious presentation in the city has the Russian Orthodox Church through the Ukrainian Orthodox Church (Moscow Patriarchate).

Near Hlukhiv in the village of Sosnivka is located a small monastery (Russian Orthodox Church) Glinsk Hermitage.

== Economy and science ==
Hlukhiv is a traditional centre of hemp cultivation, as well as textile and wood industry.

Due to the traditional cultivation of industrial hemp in the area, Hlukhiv has become home to the Institute of Bast Crops of the Ukrainian Academy of Agrarian Sciences, working on breeding improved hemp and flax cultivars. In the 1970s, the institute developed low-THC hemp varieties for industrial cultivation.

== Notable people ==
=== Born in Hlukhiv ===
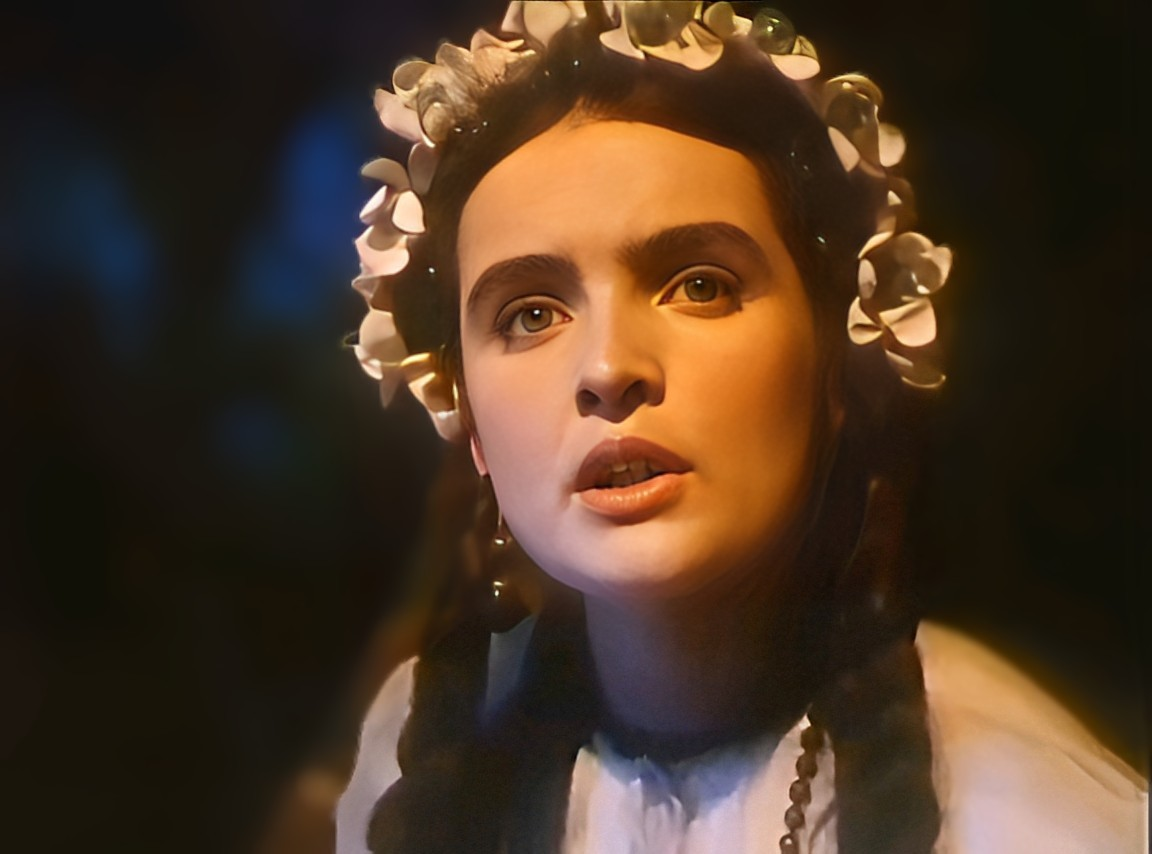
Ada Rohovtseva

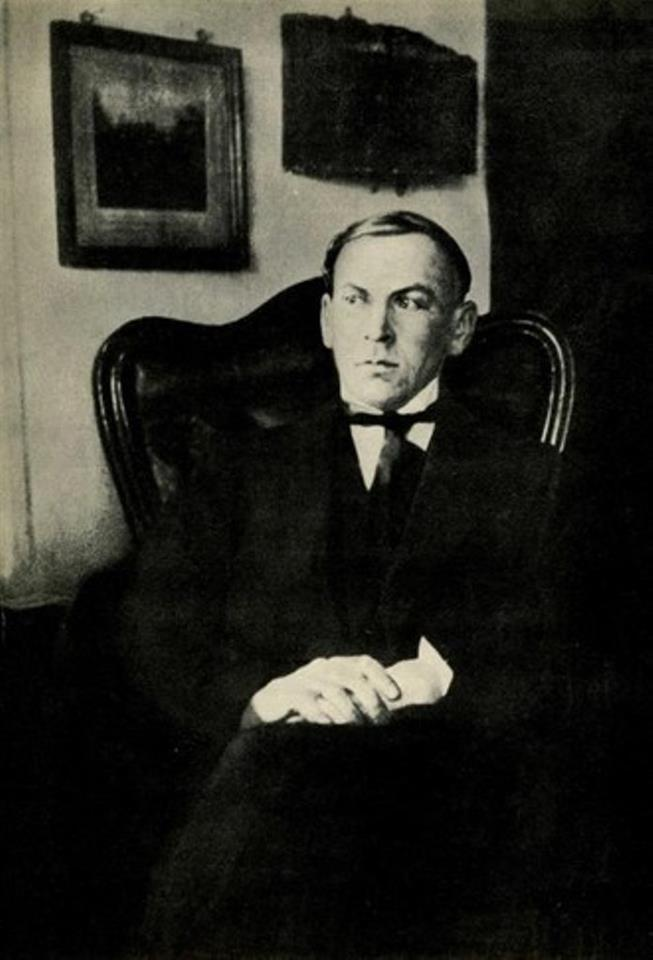
Heorhiy Narbut

- Ada Rohovtseva (born 1937) - Ukrainian actress
- Alexander Bezborodko (1747-1799) - Chancellor of the Russian Empire
- Andrey Razumovsky (1752-1836) - Russian diplomat of Ukrainian origin
- Anton Losenko (1737-1773) - Russian painter
- Dmytro Bortniansky (1751-1825) - Ukrainian composer active in the Russian Empire
- Iosif Shklovsky (1916-1985) - Soviet Jewish-Ukrainian astronomer
- Kostiantyn Tyshchenko (1941-2023) - Ukrainian linguist
- Maksym Berezovsky (1745-1777) - Ukrainian composer
- Mykola Murashko (1944-1909) - Ukrainian painter
- Nikola Tereshchenko (1819-1903) - Ukrainian businessmen, philanthropist and politician, Mayor of Hlukhiv (1861-1875)
- Roman Lutsenko (born 1985) - Ukrainian footballer
- Varvara Khanenko (1852-1922) - Ukrainian art collector and patron of arts
- Yevhen Onatsky (1894-1979) - Ukrainian scientist, member of the Central Rada
- Yuri Shaporin (1887-1966) - Soviet composer

=== Lived in Hlukhiv ===
- Alexander Dovzhenko (1894-1956) - Ukrainian film director
- Demetrius of Rostov (1651-1709) - Eastern Orthodox bishop and saint
- Heorhiy Narbut (1886-1920) - Ukrainian artist
- Fedir Ernst (1891-1942) - Ukrainian art historian
- Georgy Vysotsky (1865-1940) - Ukrainian soil scientist
- Melkhisedek (Znachko-Yavorsky) (died 1809) - Ukrainian religious figure of the 18th century
- Mykola Vasylenko (1866-1935) - Ukrainian historian and politician
- Vladimir Narbut (1888-1938) - Russian language poet

== Gallery ==
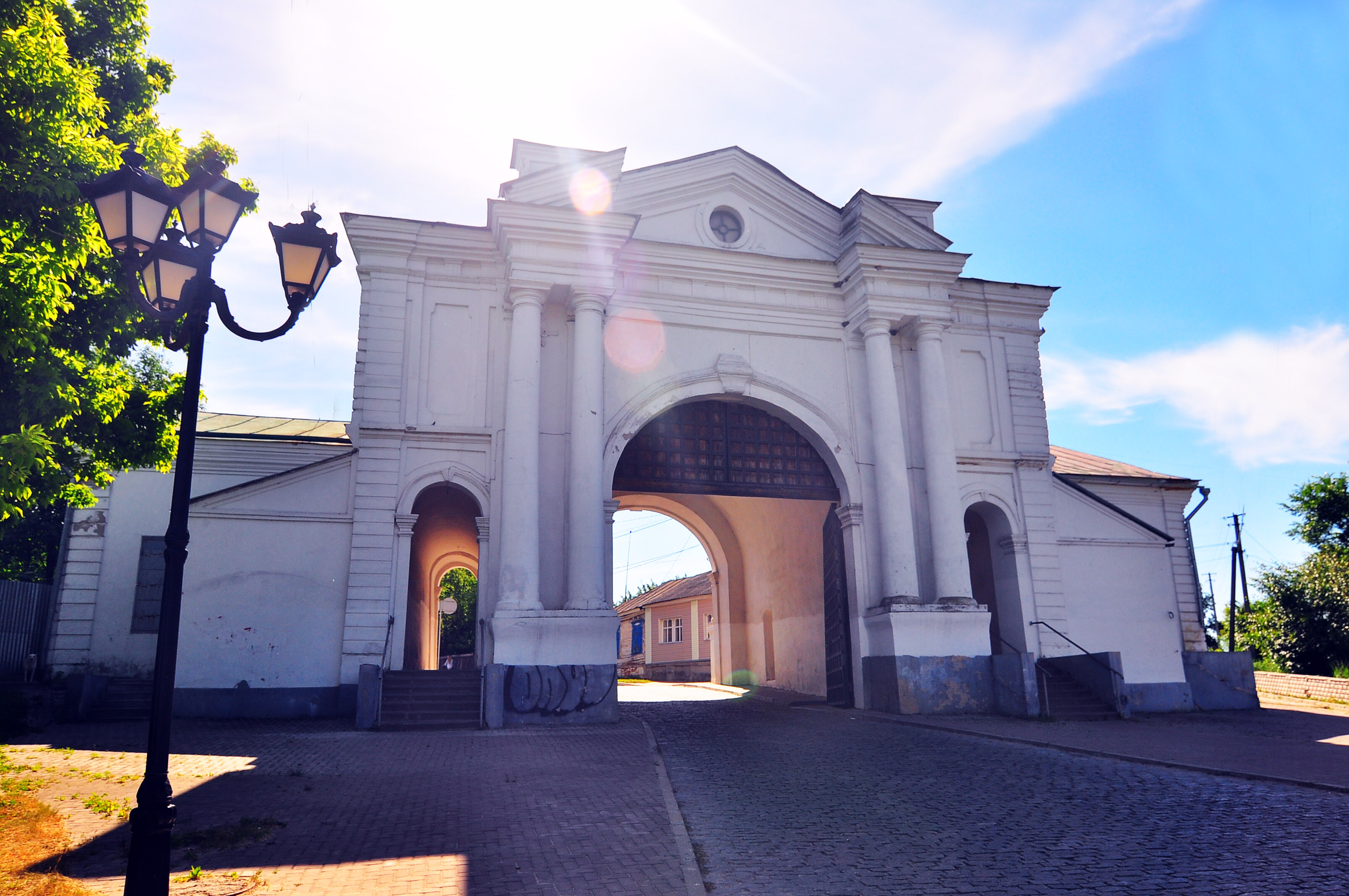
Kyiv Gate in Hlukhiv

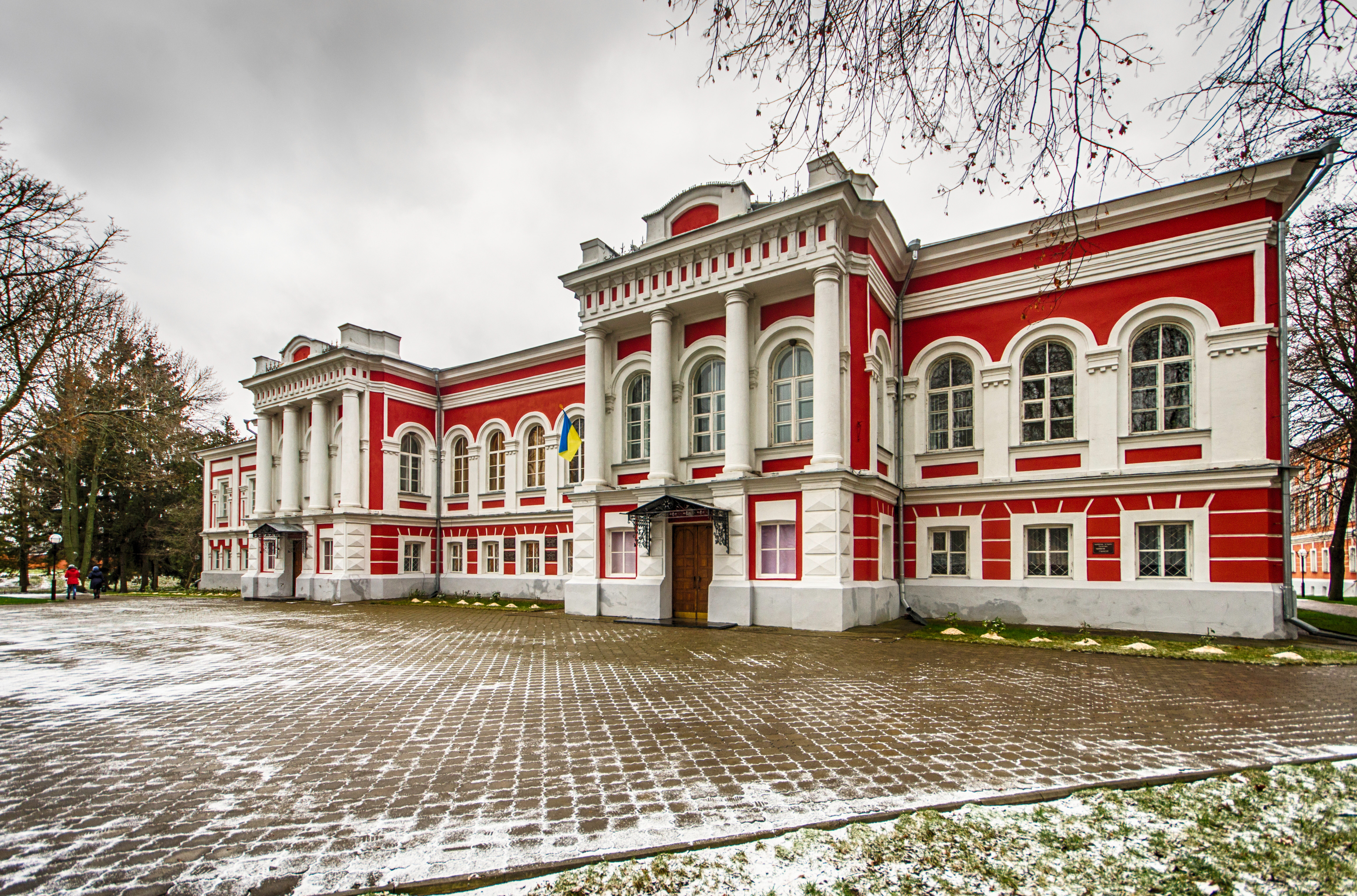
Natiolal Pedagogical University

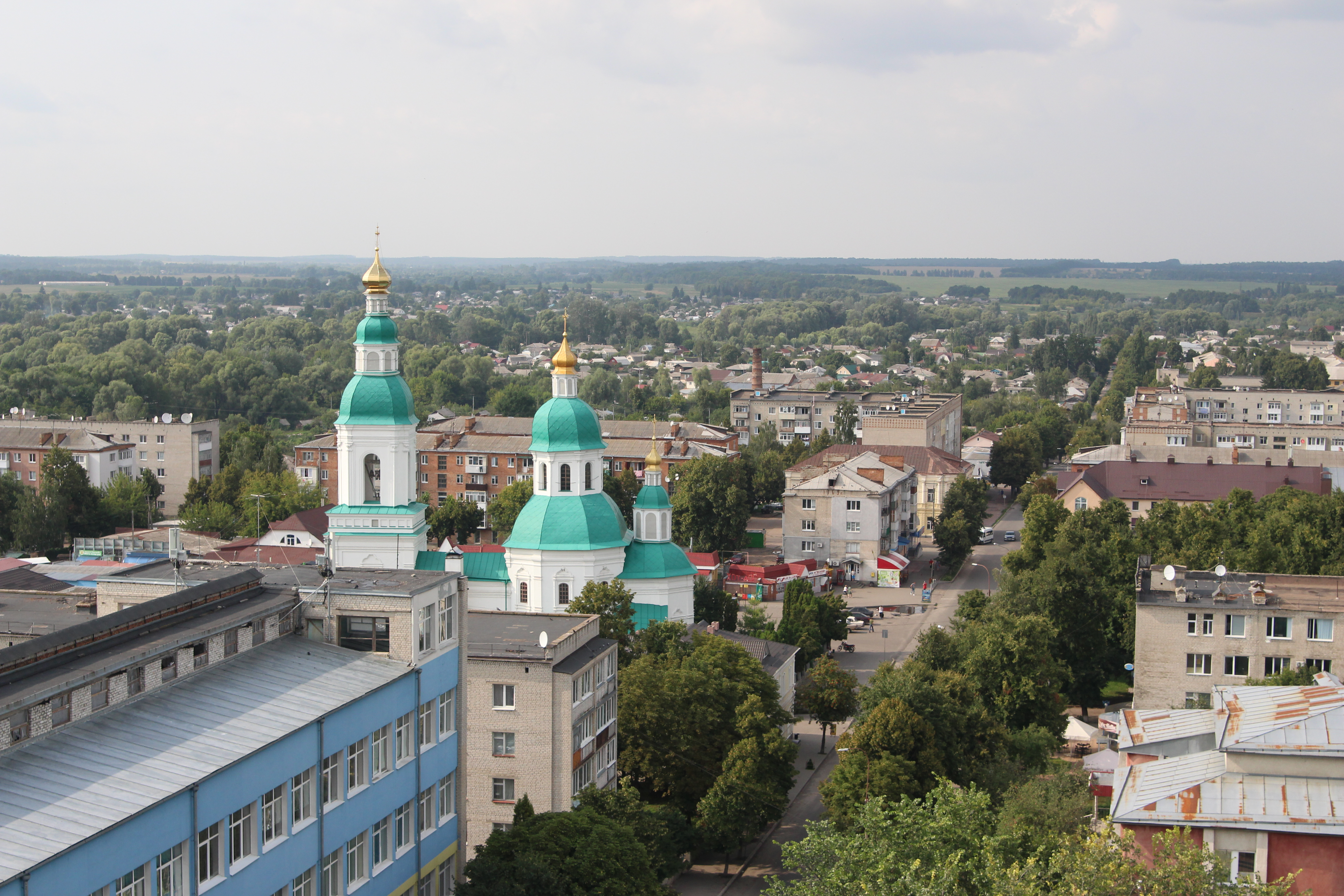
Hlukhiv skyline

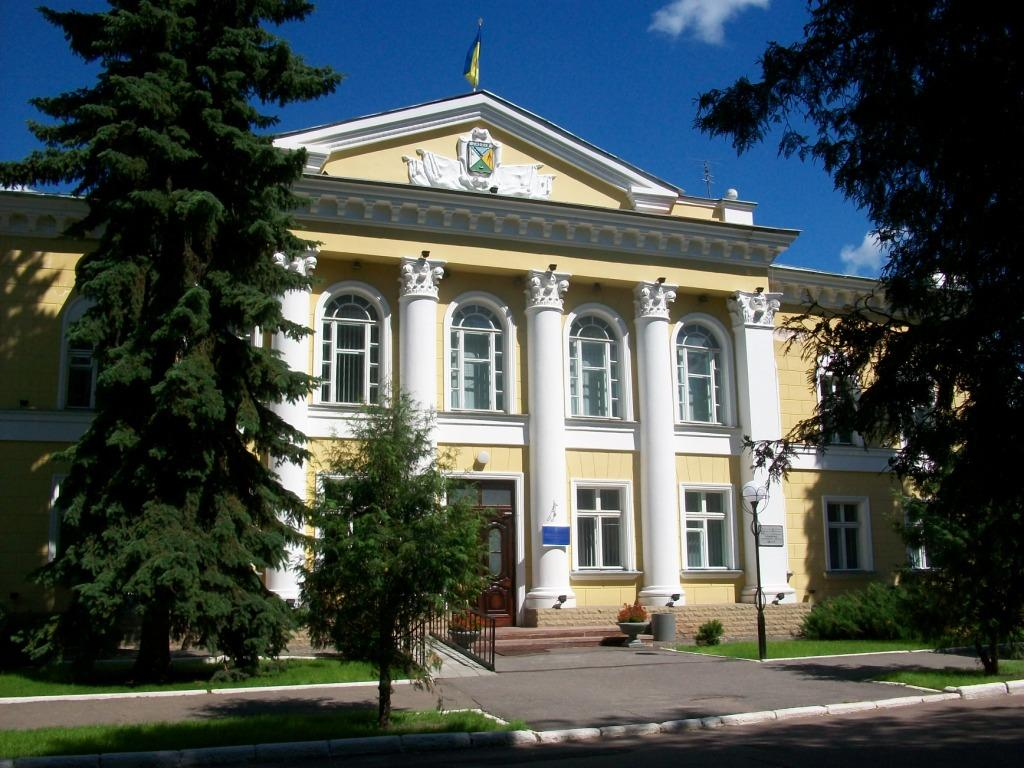
City Hall

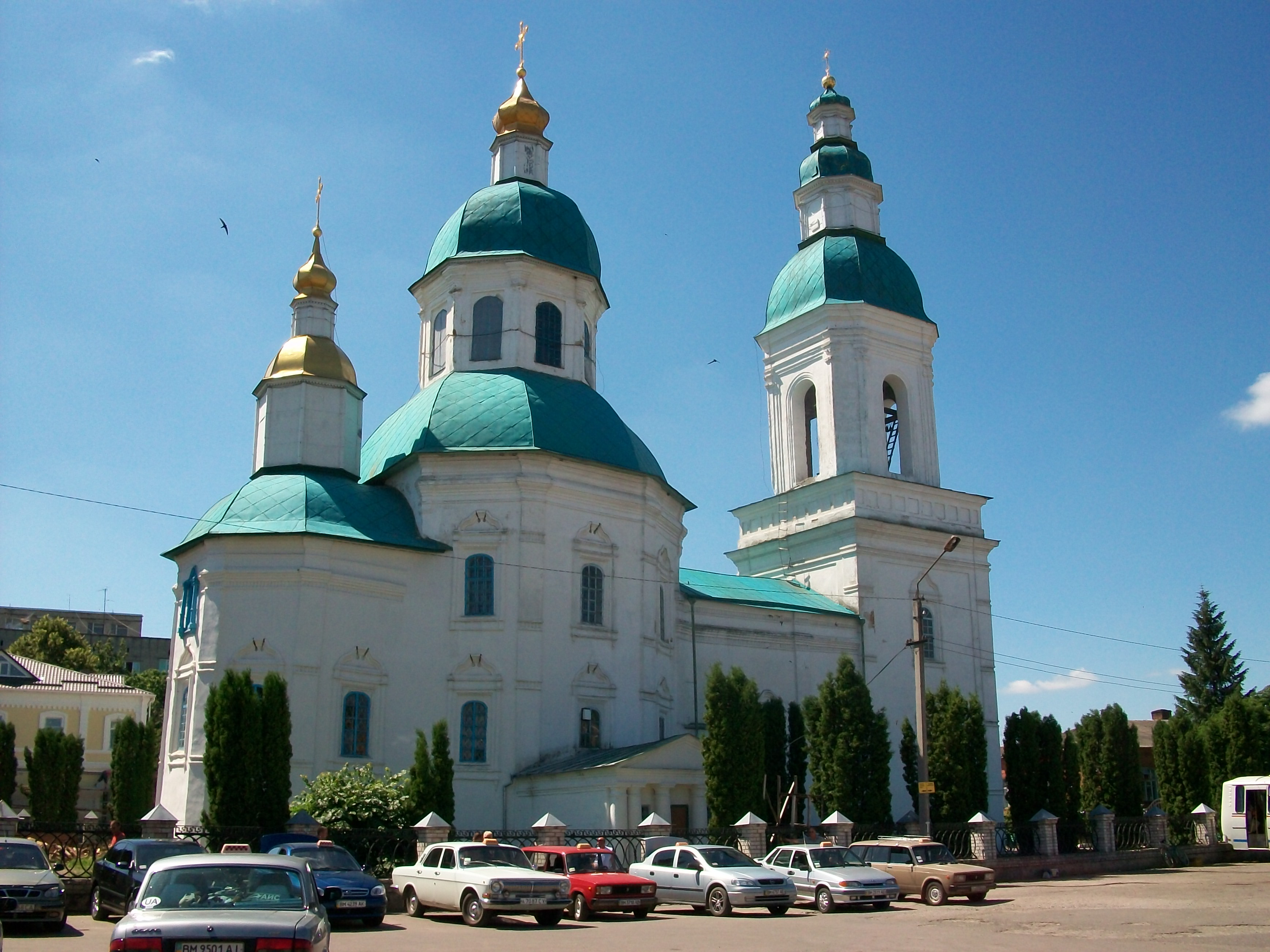
St. Nicholas Cathedral

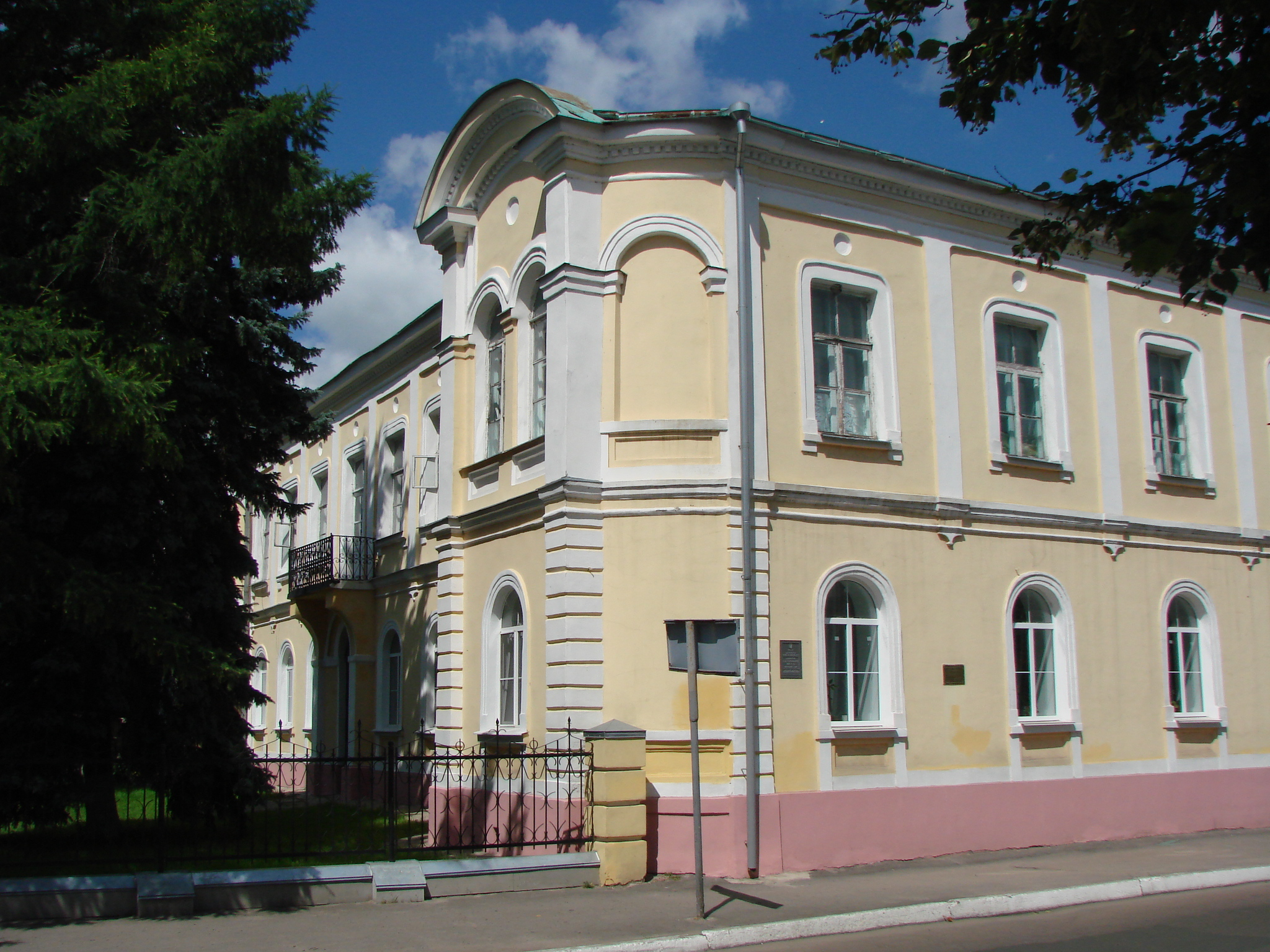
Tereshchenko mansion

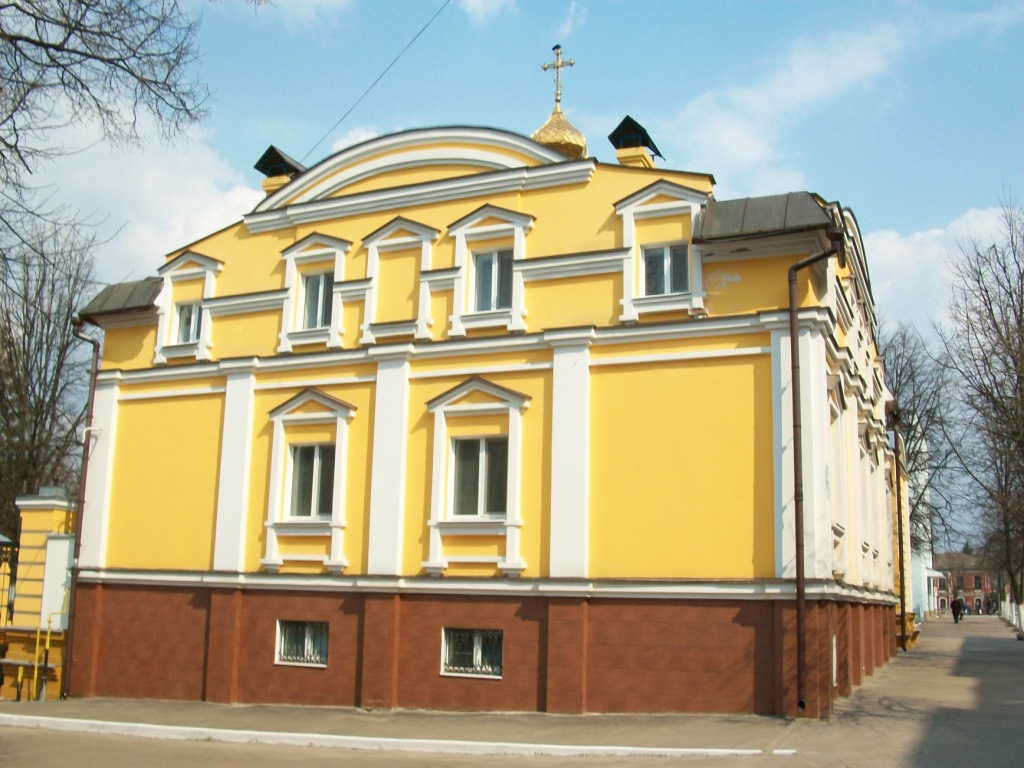
Hlukhiv seminary

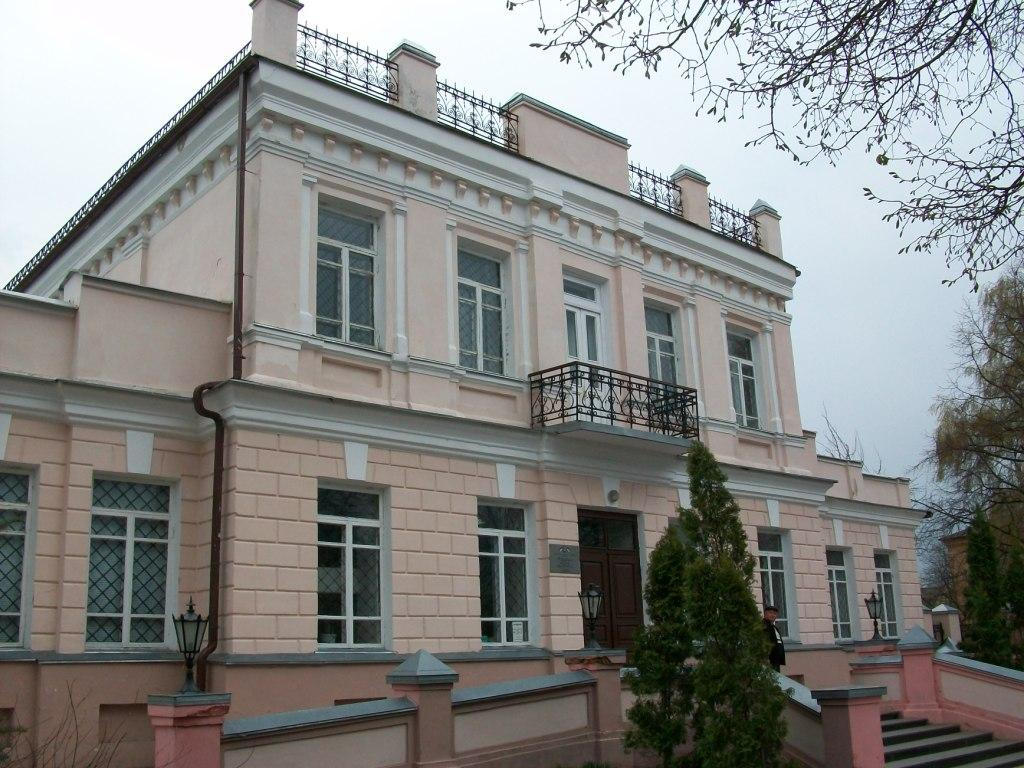
City museum

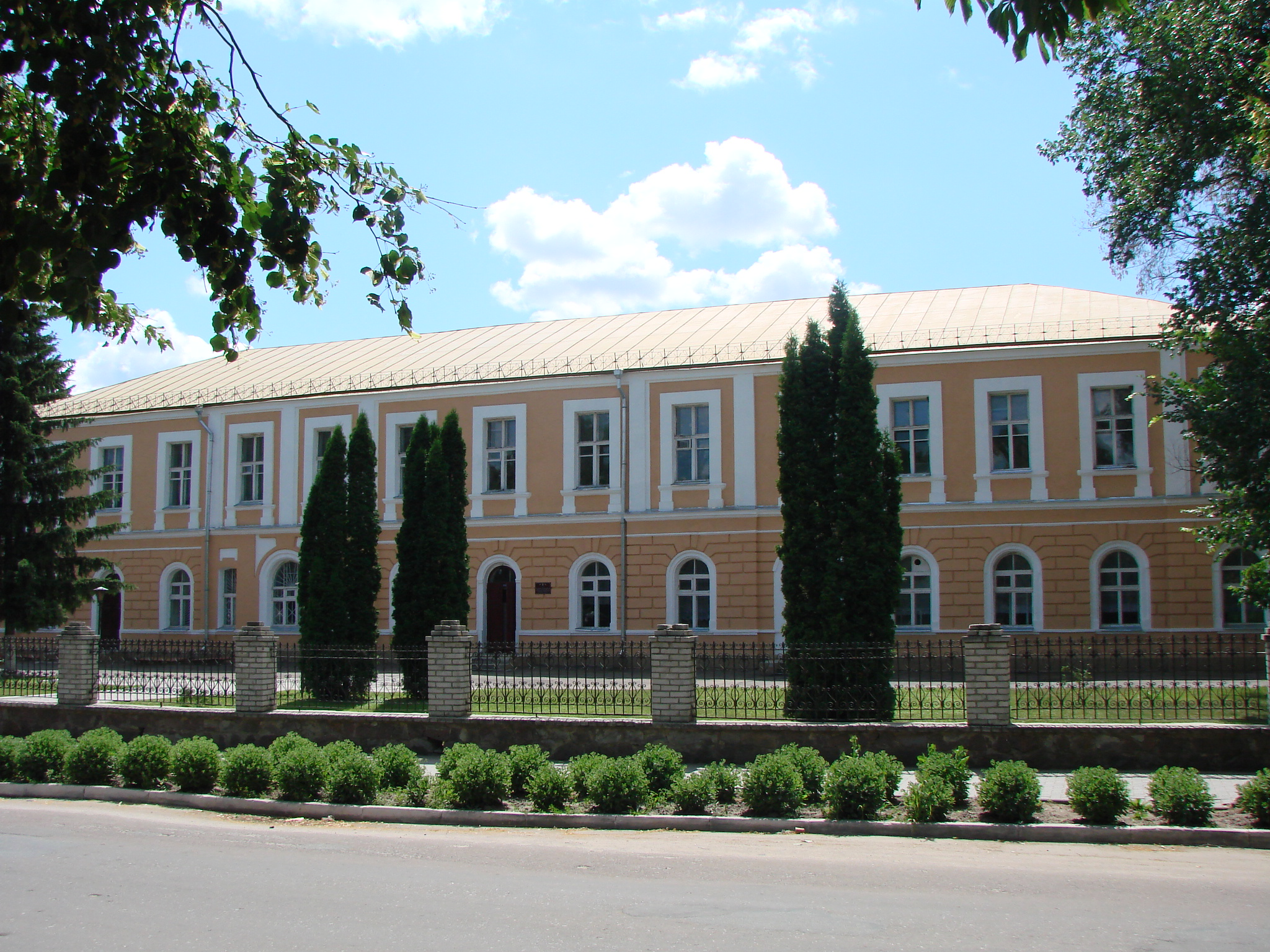
Former school of crafts

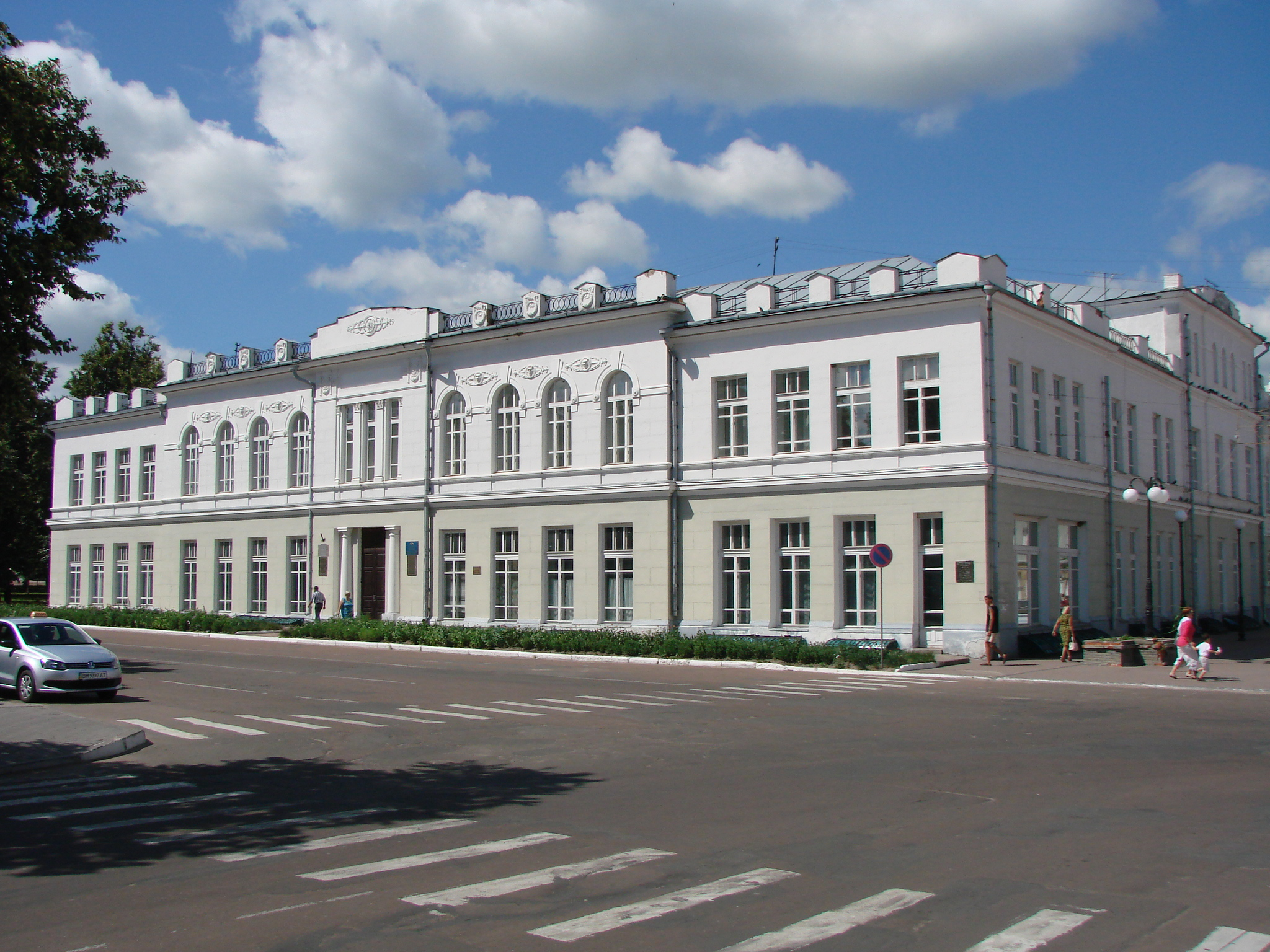
Hlukhiv National Pedagogical University

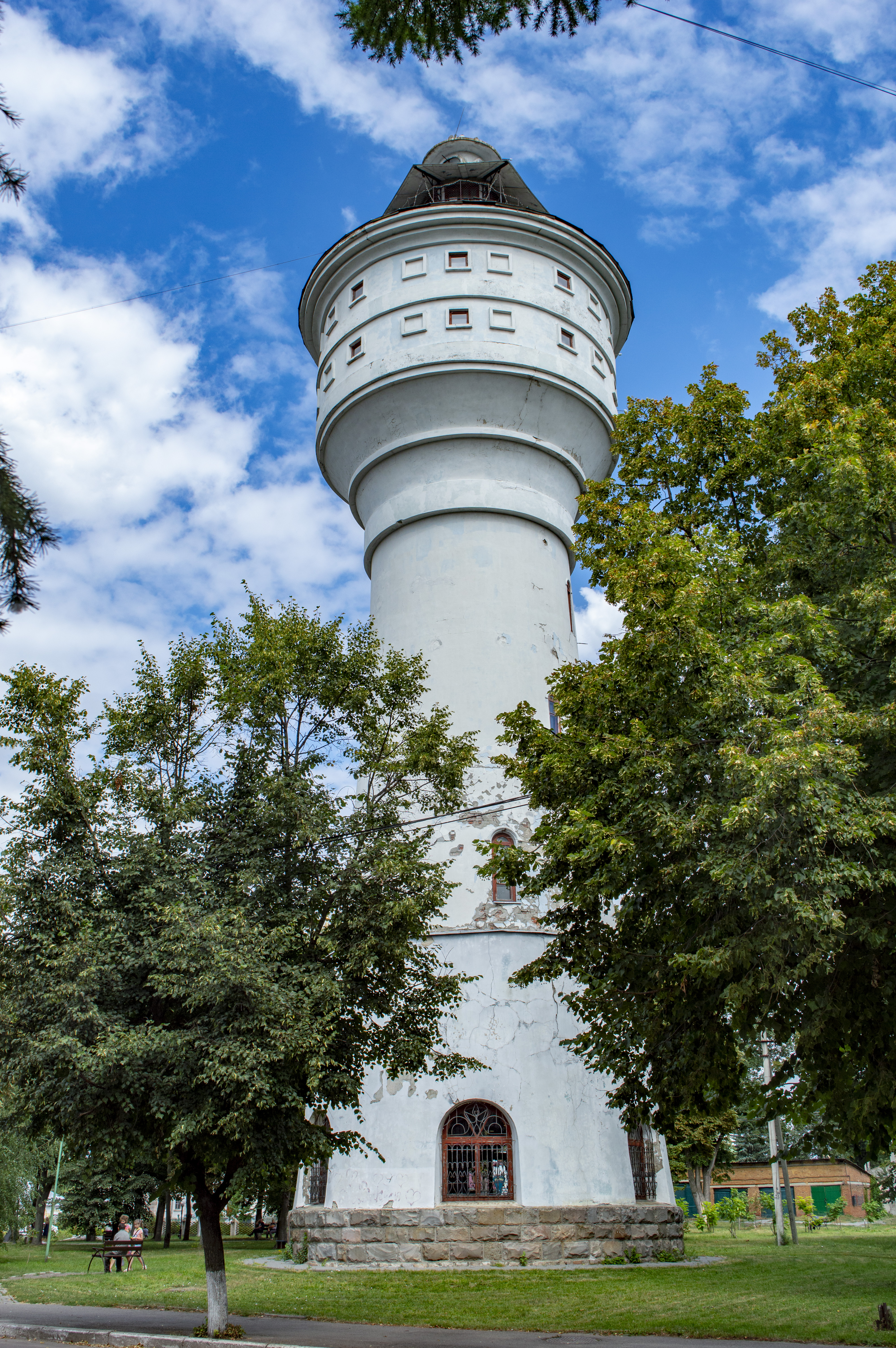
Water tower

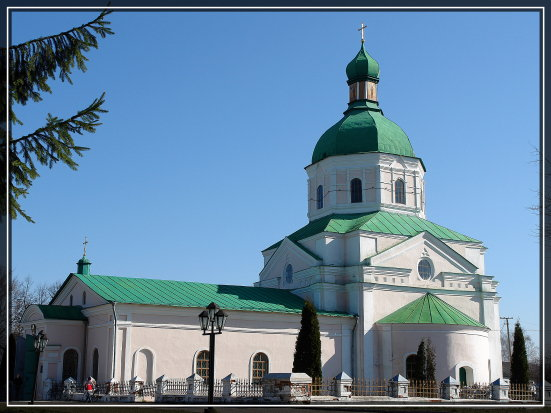
Church of Transfiguration

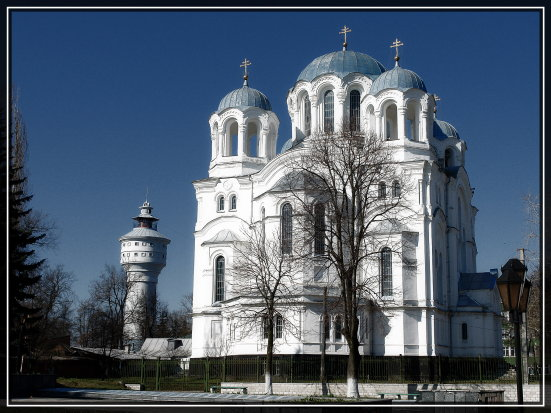
St. Anasatasia Church

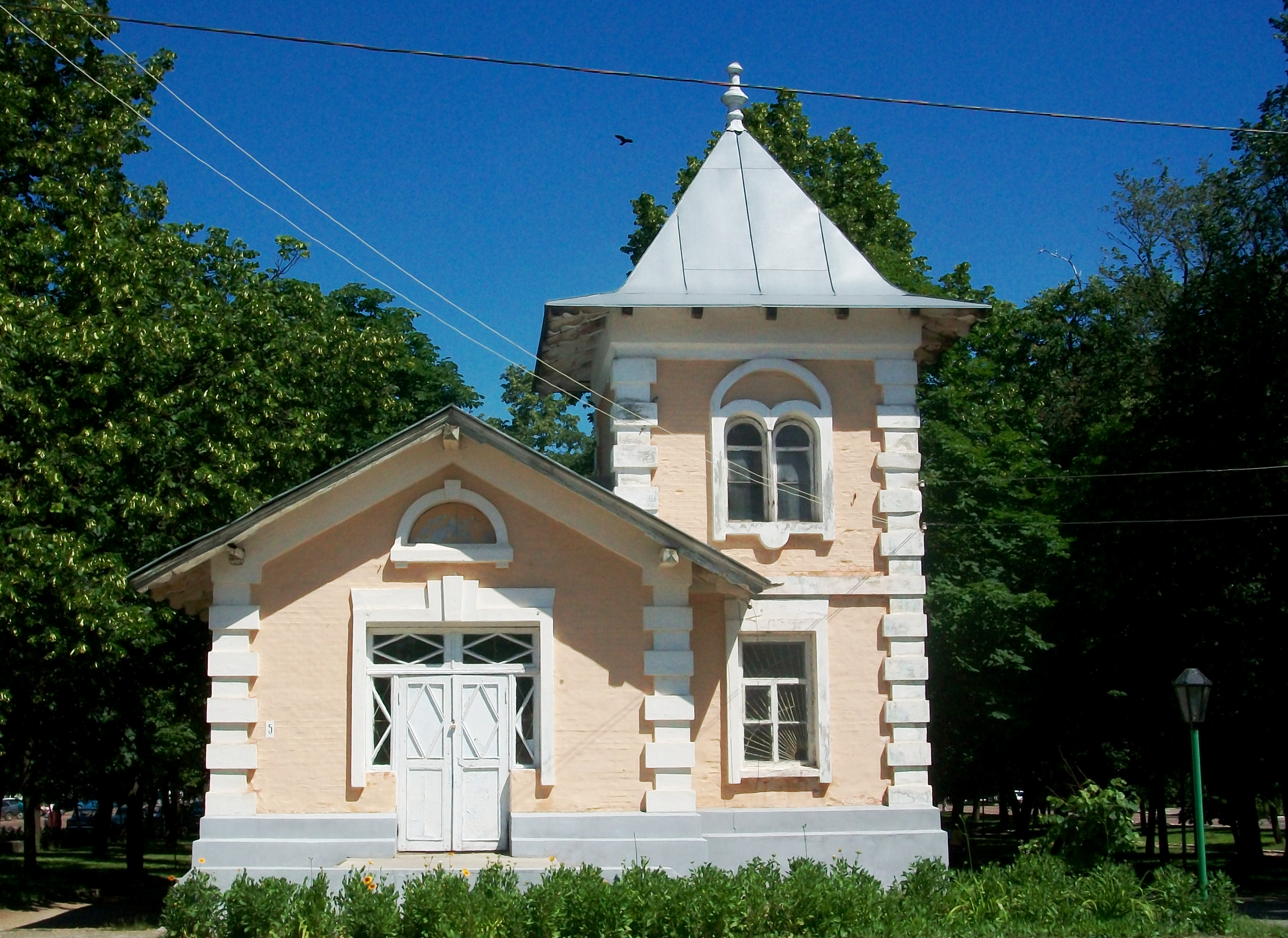
A chapel in Hlukhiv

== See also ==
- Tereshchenko family
- Tereshchenko churches
