= Marina Berezowsky =

Ukrainian choreographer (1914–2011)

- Марина Георгіївна Березовська
- Born: 14 March 1914; Saint Petersburg, Russian Empire
- Died: 19 June 2011 (aged 97); Hobart, Australia
- Education: Kyiv Art Institute
- Occupations: Ballet artist, choreographer, dance teacher
- Awards: Member of the Order of Australia

Marina Berezowsky (Ukrainian: Марина Георгіївна Березовська, romanized: Maryna Berezovska; 14 March 1914 – 19 June 2011) was a Ukrainian-Australian ballet artist, choreographer, dance teacher.

== Biography ==
=== Early years ===
Marina Narbut was born on 14 March 1914 in Saint Petersburg to the family of Ukrainian graphic artist Heorhiy Narbut, who at that time was part of the artistic movement "World of Art". When Marina was 2 years old, the family returned to Kyiv, Ukraine, where her father soon became co-founder and rector of the first Ukrainian Academy of Arts.

After the death of Heorhiy Narbut (1920) and the defeat of the Ukrainian Revolution, the family remained living in Kyiv.

From an early age, Berezowsky was in love with ballet, although due to her deceased father's fame, the family insisted on her visual arts education. Berezowskya managed to convince her mother to let her go to dance school: first she studied dance at the "Iskra" school, which taught according to the methodology of modernist Isadora Duncan, but soon left the institution due to concentrated communist propaganda in the repertoire. For several years she studied classical ballet and folk dances at the Kyiv Opera Theater under the guidance of artist and choreographer Rostislav Zakharov.

She studied at the Kyiv Art Institute (during the UNR period – Ukrainian Academy of Arts), where she met her husband – sculptor Oleksandr Berezowsky. In 1934, they got married. They had their one child - daughter Valentina - in 1940.

In 1935, as a professional dancer, she began work at the Kyiv State Theater of Musical Comedy, where her brother – artist Danylo Narbut – worked as scenic designer.

=== Repressions against the family in USSR ===
In 1937, Danylo Narbut and Berezowsky were invited to join the dance troupe of ballet modernist Kasyan Goleizovsky at the Opera Theater in the Russian city of Gorky (now Nizhny Novgorod). But they didn't work there long, as Danylo was arrested for two years for failure to report on a friend who joked in a cafe about a broken fork, saying it was "Soviet-made".

Berezowsky's uncle Volodymyr Narbut - a Russian-language poet - was that same year convicted of "Ukrainian nationalism" and drowned with other political prisoners in the Sea of Okhotsk at one of the GULAG transit points.

In an interview for the Australian National Library, Berezowsky recalled that her school teachers were tried in the Union for the Liberation of Ukraine case, which was a shock to her, and the threat of repression in the family was constantly felt due to Heorhiy Narbut's past in the Ukrainian People's Republic. His art works were banned from distribution in the USSR.

=== Farewell to Ukraine ===
During World War II, Berezowsky joined the Ukrainian Musical Theater, which Wehrmacht troops were forced to evacuate from Kyiv to Stanyslaviv (Ivano-Frankivsk) in 1943 under pressure from the Red Army. There, she met the chief ballet master of the State Hutsul Song and Dance Ensemble, Yaroslav Chuperchuk, and wanted to stay working in his troupe. However, the Germans sent her and her husband to Berlin for forced labor, where Berezowsky had to participate in dance performances for German soldiers and Ostarbeiters from Central and Eastern Europe.

After the end of World War II, the Berezowskys lived for another 4 years in a displaced persons camp near Hamburg, where she organized a dance group for girls of various nationalities. There, Soviet agents tried to convince the Berezowskys to return to the USSR, but they refused due to the threat of repressions.

=== Move to Western Australia ===
In 1949, Marina, Alexsander and Valentina emigrated to Australia, where they settled in the city of Perth. She was invited to teach ballet at the Perth Ballet School, and later at the school of Linley Wilson - an Australian dance entrepreneur, daughter of Western Australia Premier Frank Wilson. She also taught at Dorothy Fleming's ballet school, where she staged the original ballet "Sadko" to the music of Rimsky-Korsakov.

In 1952, Berezowsky co-founded the West Australian Ballet, which operates to this day. There she created choreography for the ballets "Le Parasolle" (music by Franz Schubert, arranged by John Pemberthy), "Romaine" (music arranged by Gennady Tamarchenko), and "Polovtsian Dances" (music by Alexander Borodin). For the ballet "Cinderella", Berezowsky created the choreography, set design, and costume design. Paradoxically, today there are no mentions of Marina Berezowsky and her role on the ballet company's website.

=== Berezowsky and the Formation of Australian National Ballet ===
From Perth, the Berezowsky family moved to Melbourne. There were more employment opportunities there not only for Oleksandr Berezowsky: later he became a renowned sculptor, whose works were acquired by the National Gallery of Australia and also to New Zealand. Berezowsky was invited as a classical ballet teacher in Edouard Borovansky's company.

When the ballet school under the Australian Ballet started operating in 1964 under the direction of Dame Margaret Scott, Marina Berezowsky joined it as one of the four first teachers. There she taught classical and character dance for 16 years.

From 1969 to 1975, she also worked with Laurel Martin at the Victorian Ballet Guild (later Ballet Victoria). In the early years, starting from 1964, the second half of the performance at the end of the academic year at the Australian Ballet School was always a character ballet created by Madame Berezowsky. At the celebration of the 30th anniversary of the Australian Ballet School in 1994, the same week she turned 80, she received recognition as the school's longest-serving teacher at that time.

=== Australian dance company "Kolobok" ===
In the early 1970s, Berezowsky won a grant from the Australian government and created the company "Kolobok" that performed character dances of different nations. For 7 years, the ensemble toured throughout Australia, gaining wide recognition and response in the popular press.

From 1977 to mid-1984, Berezowsky taught character dance at the Victorian College of the Arts (VCA). After a visit to Europe in 1984, Mrs. Berezowsky left VCA. She subsequently became a widely respected member of the character dance jury at the Australian Ballet School.

=== Journey to Ukraine ===
In 1994, as a gift for her 80th birthday, her dancers, former students, colleagues and friends from around the world paid for a trip to Ukraine for her and her granddaughter Yvonne Collins. At that time, she had not seen her brother Danylo Narbut and other family members for over 50 years.

=== Death ===
In April 1996, at the age of 82, Berezowsky moved to live with her daughter Valentina and son-in-law Paul Sime in the city of Hobart, where in retirement she enjoyed her other artistic passions - drawing and painting. Berezowsky died in Hobart at the age of 97 on 19 June 2011.

== Recognition ==
In June 1984 Marina Berezowsky was awarded the title of Member of the General Division of the Order of Australia (AM) for services to classical ballet.

The Berezowsky - Howard Award for Excellence in Character Dance is presented at the Australian Ballet School.
