= Chervone-Pustohorod =

Airfield in Esman, Hlukhiv Raion, Ukraine

Chervone Pustohorod Червоне-Пустогород
- IATA: none; ICAO: ZD4V

Summary
- Airport type: Military
- Operator: unknown
- Location: Esman, Hlukhiv Raion
- Elevation AMSL: 636 ft / 194 m
- Coordinates: 51°51′13″N 034°03′19″E
- Interactive map of Chervone Pustohorod

Runways
Direction	Length		Surface
Direction	ft	m	Surface
	8,202	2,500	Concrete

Chervone-Pustohorod (Ukrainian: Червоне-Пустогород) was an airfield in Ukraine located 22 km northeast of Hlukhiv. It was built as a forward operating base for wartime use.

It is named after a town of Esman that in 1957–2016 was known as Chervone.
