= Vladimir Narbut =

Ukrainian poet

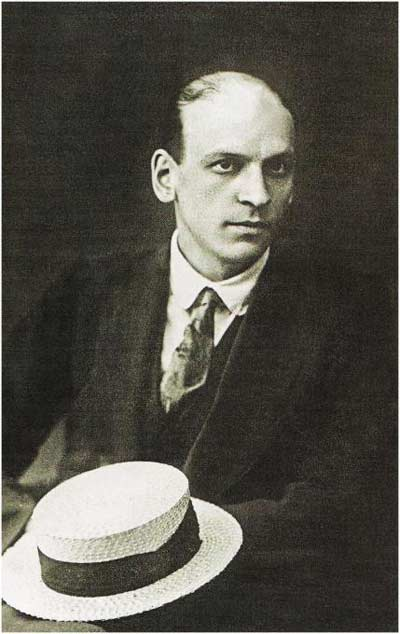
Volodymyr Narbut

Volodymyr Ivanovych Narbut (Ukrainian: Володимир Іванович Нарбут; 1888–1938) was a Ukrainian Russian language poet and a member of the Acmeist group. He was also brother to artist and graphic designer Heorhiy Narbut.

== Biography ==
Volodymyr Ivanovych Narbut was born on his family's estate at Narbutivka, near the town of Hlukhiv in the Chernigov Governorate of the Russian Empire (now part of the Sumy Oblast of Ukraine). His family had origins of ancient Lithuanian nobility. In 1906, Narbut and his brother Heorhiy (the painter and graphic designer Heorhiy Ivanovich Narbut) moved to Saint Petersburg where Vladimir studied mathematics and Oriental languages. Narbut's poems first appeared in print in 1908, and two years later he published his debut collection of verse Stikhi. God tvorchestva pervyi ('Poems. Year One of Creative Work'). His second collection, Alliluiia ("Hallelujah," 1912)—filled with "grotesque and vivid imagery" according to the Handbook of Russian Literature—satirized the landed gentry, and copies were seized by the police as pornographic. To avoid the ensuing scandal and a court trial, Narbut spent the next five months on an ethnographic expedition to Ethiopia and Somalia. He returned to Russia after the amnesty declared on the occasion of the 300th anniversary of the Romanov dynasty in March 1913. On his return Narbut became the publisher and editor of the magazine Novyi zhurnal dlia vsekh until he had to give it up for financial reasons.

After the February Revolution broke out in 1917, Narbut joined the Bolsheviks. One night early in 1918, armed men broke into the Narbut family home and killed his brother Sergei. Narbut himself was wounded and had to have his left hand amputated. During the Russian Civil War, Narbut published literary magazines in Voronezh and Kyiv. He was arrested by the White Guards in Rostov-on-Don and imprisoned until being released by the Red Army. In the 1920s, he edited the magazines Lava and Oblava in Odesa and issued further collections of his own verse, including Aleksandra Pavlovna (1922), the last to appear in his lifetime. In 1928 he was accused of not telling the truth about his imprisonment by the Whites and was expelled from the Communist Party. He began writing lyrics again in the 1930s and another collection, Spiral', was due to be published when he was arrested on October 26, 1936, and accused of belonging to subversive "Ukrainian nationalist" group. He sentenced to five years in the gulag, and was incarcerated in prison camps near Vladivostok and Magadan. The circumstances of his death and its date are uncertain; the registered date of 1944 is in all likelihood invented. He was likely either summarily shot in 1938, or drowned with a group of prisoners in sealed barge in the Arctic Ocean (according to Nadezhda Mandelshtam).

A translation of Narbut's poem "Portrait" appears in the anthology Modern Russian Poetry, ed. Vladimir Markov and Merrill Sparks (Bobbs Merrill, 1967).

== Sources ==
- Brief biography of Narbut in Russian
