= Hlukhiv National Pedagogical University of Oleksandr Dovzhenko =

Public university in Hlukhiv, Ukraine

Oleksandr Dovzhenko Hlukhiv National Pedagogical University
- ДЗВО «Глухівський національний педагогічний університет імені Олександра Довженка»
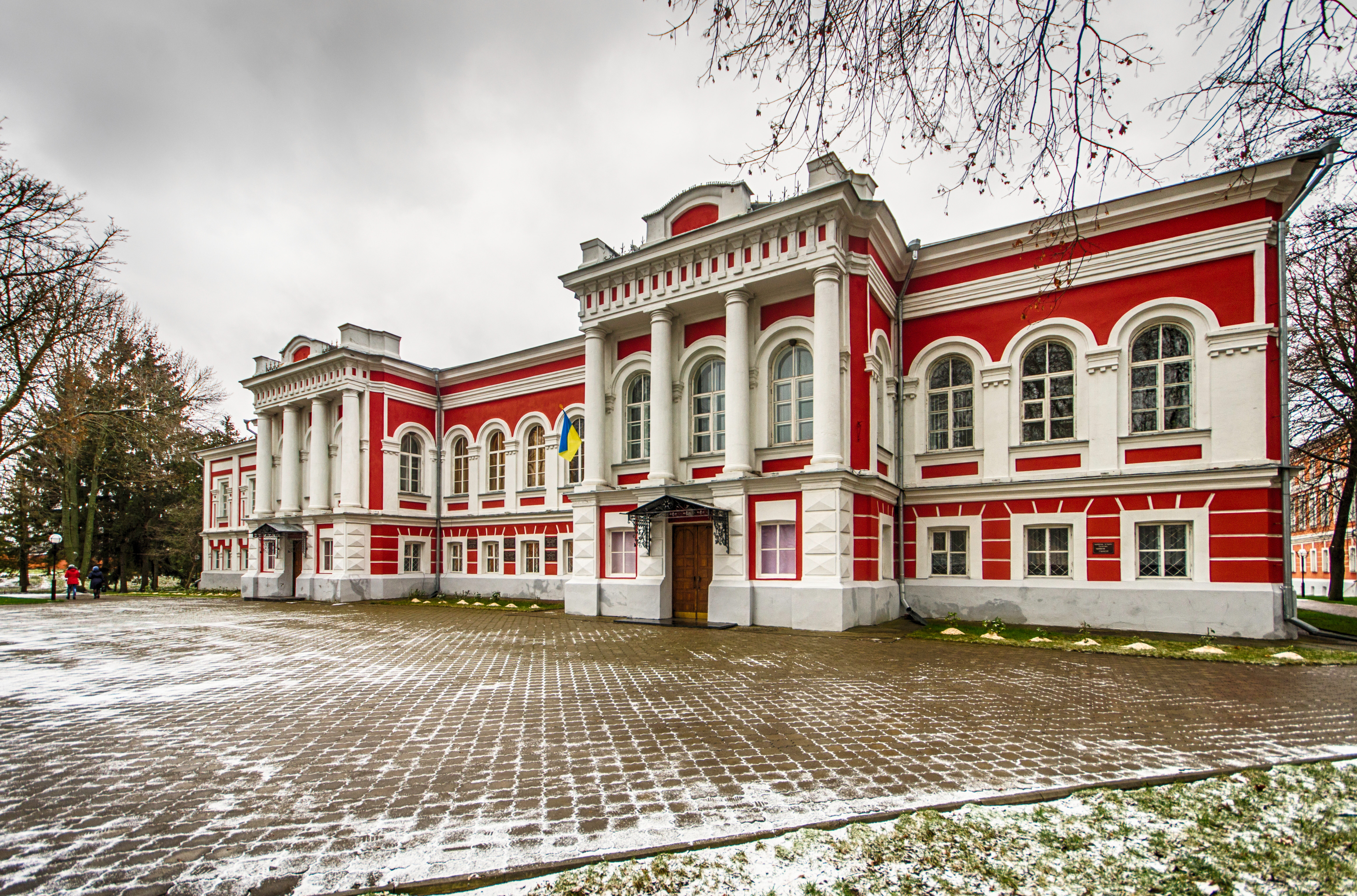
- Main building
- Type: public university, pedagogical
- Established: 1874
- Affiliations: Ministry of Education and Science of Ukraine
- Rector: Oleksandr Kurok
- Students: ~5,000
- Location: Hlukhiv, Sumy Oblast, Ukraine; 51.67515°N 33.91018°E
- Campus: Urban
- Website: www.gnpu.edu.ua
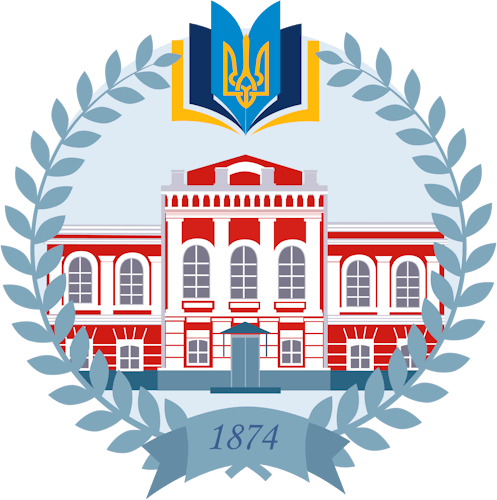

The Oleksandr Dovzhenko Hlukhiv National Pedagogical University (Ukrainian: Глухівський національний педагогічний університет імені Олександра Довженка) is a university in Hlukhiv, Ukraine. The university was founded in 1874 as a teachers institute. It was awarded the status of pedagogical university in 2001. Hlukhiv University is an integral part of the educational system of Ukraine.

As an educational establishment of the European type with known and famous traditions, the university follows the time demands giving training to the young generation. In more than 100 years of history of the university different social, political and economic changes in the society were reflected. It currently has three faculties and about 5,000 students.

== History ==
Programmes of re-organizing the school system and re-building the pedagogical education system caused the existence of the following periods in the historical development of the educational development:

=== 1874–1917 ===
On September 21, 1874, the official opening Hlukhiv teachers training institute took place. It was the educational establishment with three-year term of studying preparing teachers for the town colleges.

=== 1917–1921 ===
The pedagogical institute existed with the Literary and History, Physics and Mathematics, Natural and Geography departments.

=== 1921–1924 ===
People's education institute with the Literary and History, Physics and Mathematics, Natural and Geography departments which prepared teachers for comprehensive schools according to three and then four years terms of studying. At the same time two years special comprehensive courses for preparing youth for studying at higher educational establishments existed.

=== 1924–1925 ===
Pedagogical courses included to the pre-study and the first course.

=== 1925–1930 ===
Pedagogical college preparing teachers with higher pedagogical education for primary schools.

=== 1930–1933 ===
Social education institute with three years term of studying.

=== 1933–1937 ===
Pedagogical institute with three years term of studying which prepared teachers for comprehensive schools at five faculties: Mathematics, Physics, Language and Literature, History, Agro Biology.

=== 1937–1954 ===
Teachers training institute with two years term of study and with two departments: Physics and Mathematics, Natural and Geographical. During the years of fascist occupation, the institute was badly damaged. The ruined building 2 of the institute. Valuable books from the institute library, equipment of the studies were ruined but the educational establishment was the first among the institutes to recommence its work in 1943. In summer of 1944 sixty young specialists got their diplomas. In 1945 the institute had already 180 graduates.

=== 1954–1956 ===
Pedagogical institute with Physics and Mathematics faculty trained teachers for secondary school.

=== 1956–1972 ===
Pedagogical institute trained teachers with higher education for primary school with the specialty “Pedagogics and Methodics of primary education” at full-time and extramural forms of studying.

=== 1972–1986 ===
Pedagogical institute with two faculties: primary school teachers training and technical subjects and Labour training teachers training.

=== 1986–1993 ===
Pedagogical institute with faculties: pre-school education, primary school teachers training, Labour training teachers training.

=== 1993–2010 ===
The university confirmed its status as the higher pedagogical educational establishment of the European type. By the order of the Ukrainian Government #504 of May 2001 Hlukhiv state pedagogical institute got the status of university. According to the Ukrainian government order #958 of July 16, 2008 Hlukhiv state pedagogical university was named after its famous graduate, famous writer and film director Oleksandr Dovzhenko; according to the decision of the State accreditation commission of July 2, 2009, protocol #79, the educational establishment was recognized for the 4th accreditation level; according to the President of Ukraine order of October 1, 2009 #792/2009 for the state and international acknowledgement of its activity and for the profound contribution into the development of national education and science the university got the status of national. On the basis of the university after graduate scientific training in the following specialties: 13.00.04 – Theory and Methodics of the professional education; 10.01.01 – Ukrainian literature; 13.00.02 – Theory and Methodics of education; 13.00.05 – Social Pedagogics was started.

In 2009, the university was named after one of its alumni, the famed Ukrainian filmmaker Oleksandr Dovzhenko (Note: Ukrainian: Олександр Довженко, Russian: Александр Довженко, romanized: Aleksandr Dovzhenko)

== Academics ==
=== Structure ===
The university structure has

- 5 faculties;
- professional pedagogical college;
- pre-professional and post-graduate education teaching and scientific institute;
- 6 distance education centers (towns of Sumy, Konotop, Bar, Mohyliv-Podil's’ky, Sevastopol’ and Sosnytsya);
- 21 departments, renewed scientific library, sports complexes, the best in the town hostels

also there exist scientific research laboratories on history and culture of Siveshchyna, primary teaching in the national school problems, dialectology, specialized laboratories, teaching productive workshops, historical pedagogical museum founded on October 25, 2001, on the basis of the Hlukhiv pedagogical institute history museum and representing the university history, pedagogical, scientific, literary and artistic heritage of the university teachers and students. The educational establishment prepares the professionals of the educational and professional levels of “bachelor”, “specialist” and “master” in the following fields of knowledge: pedagogical education, humanitarian, natural sciences, social and political sciences, physical training, sport and health. Taking into account the modern needs of the society the university licenses the actual specialties and specializations.

=== Teaching and learning ===
21 departments prepare the professionals of the educational and professional levels of “bachelor”, “specialist” and “master” in the following fields of knowledge: pedagogical education, humanitarian, natural sciences, social and political sciences, physical training, sport and health. On the basis of the university after graduate scientific training in the specialties of Theory and Methodics of the professional education and Ukrainian literature was started. The education process at the university is provided by 280 teachers among which there are 25 professors and 137 assistant professors. The university staff works fruitfully at enlarging the achievements of the Ukrainian and world pedagogical science, forming the state intellectual potential, creating all the conditions for the creative self-realization and cultural development of the teacher's personality. The university has profound scientific, artistic and sports achievements. The students won many times international and national sports competitions, students subjects contests and scientific works contests.

=== Student life ===
The students can use the modern rooms, scientific and learning libraries, rear books library, reading halls, computering laboratories, foreign languages laboratory, students’ café, sports complexes, the best in the town hostels. The students won many times international and national sports competitions, students subjects contests and scientific works contests. The educational establishment prepares and provides in-service training of the specialists of the educational and professional levels of “bachelor”, “specialist”, “master” in the following fields of knowledge: pedagogical education, humanitarian, natural sciences, social and political sciences, physical training, sport and health. Nowadays it is the educational establishment of the European type with powerful and effective education system, known and famous. It is situated on the glorious kozak territory full of spirit of glory, courage, honour, based on the best pedagogical traditions it follows the time demands giving profound education to the young generation.

== Noted people ==
=== Faculty and staff ===
The following people have been the heads of the educational establishment:

- Oleksandr Vasylyovych Belyavs’ky (1874–1894)
- Ivan Semenovych Andrievs’ky (1894–1905)
- N.A Mylovs’ky (1905–1909)
- M.S. Hryhorevs’ky (1909–1913)
- Leonid Yakovych Apostolov (1913–1916)
- Kostyantyn Pavlovych Yahodovs’ky (1916–1923)
- Yakiv Mykhailovych Kolubovs’ky (1923–1924)
- Pavlo Fedorovych Ivchenko (the head of the pedagogical courses from September 1924 until December 1924)
- Yakiv Mykolayovych Morachevs’ky (the head of the pedagogical courses from December 1924 until July 1924)
- Yuriy Havrylovych Nesterenko (Pedagogical college director in 1925–1927)
- Ivan Dmytrovych Loshnyakov (Pedagogical college director in 1927–1930)
- Platon Spyrydonovych Horily (Social education institute director in 1930–1931)
- Dmytro Ivanovych Dons’ky (Social education institute director in 1931–1932)
- Yuriy Havrylovych Rozhkov (Social education institute, pedagogical institute, pedagogical college and preparing courses director in 1932–1934)
- Leonid Havrylovych Harkusha (pedagogical workshops director 1935–1938)
- Oleksandr Havrylovych Strel’tsov (pedagogical, later teachers training institute director in 1935–1938)
- S.D.Navoyenko (teachers training institute director in 1938)
- Dmytro Mykhailovych Haran (teachers training institute director in 1938–1941,1943–1945)
- Ivan Fedorovych Chuiko (1945–1947)
- Hryhoriy L’vovych Sapiton (1947–1952)
- Feliks Adamovych Mazur (1952–1954)
- Oleksandr Dmytrovych Tomchuk (Pedagogical institute rector, 1954–1971)
- Ivan Tykhonovych Kachan (1971–1980)
- Mykola Ivanovych Velykoluh (1980–1985)
- Leonid Volodymyrovych Hnatyuk (1985–1990)
- Mykola Petrovych Volos (executing rector's duties from May 15, 1990, until November 11, 1990)
- Volodymyr Mykhailovych Kurylenko (1990–1995)
- O.I.Horbenko (executing rector's duties from October 5, 1995, until March 19, 1996)
- Volodymyr Fedorovych Chyrva (1996–1999)
- Mykola Petrovych Volos (executing rector's duties from October 26, 1999, until May 31, 2000)
- Oleksandr Ivanovych Kurok (since 2000).

=== Notable alumni ===
- Famed Ukrainian filmmaker Oleksandr Dovzhenko
- Serhiy Sednev, Ukrainian biathlete.
- Sergei Sergeyev-Tsensky, writer and academician

== See also ==
List of universities in Ukraine
