= Hlukhiv Regiment =

Hlukhiv Regiment Глухівський полк
- Coat of Arms
- Active: 1663 - 1665
- Country: Cossack Hetmanate
- Allegiance: Ivan Briukhovetsky
- Type: Cossack Regiment
- Size: 6 sotnias
- Garrison/HQ: Hlukhiv, Ukraine
- Engagements: Russo-Polish War (1654–1667)

The Hlukhiv Regiment (Ukrainian: Глухівський полк, romanized: Hlukhivskyi polk) was one the territorial-administrative subdivisions of the Cossack Hetmanate. The regiment's capital was the city of Hlukhiv, now in Sumy Oblast of northeastern Ukraine.

The Hlukhiv Regiment was founded in 1663 by hetman Ivan Briukhovetsky. It was formed from sotnias of Nizhyn Regiment located on different bank of Seym river.

After its abolition in 1665, all of the sotnias went back to Nizhyn Regiment.

== Structure ==
The regiment comprised 6 sotnias:

- Voronizh
- Hlukhiv
- Korop
- Krolevets
- Novi Mlyny
- Yampil

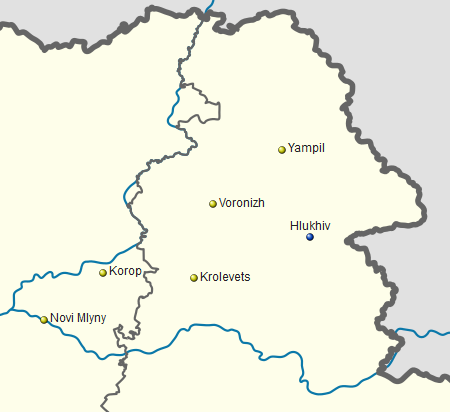
Hlukhiv regiment sotnias location

== Commanders ==
All commanders were Colonels.

- Kyrylo Hulianytskyi 1663-1664
- Vasyl Cherkashchenytsia 1664-1665

== Sources ==
Заруба, Віктор (2007), Адміністративно-територіальний устрій та адміністрація Війська Запорозького у 1648-1782 рр. [Administrative-territorial structure and administration of the Zaporizhzhya Army in 1648-1782.] (in Ukrainian), Dnipro: Lira, ISBN 978-966-383-095-7
