= Khanenko Museum =

Art museum in Kyiv, Ukraine

Coordinates: 50°26′28″N 30°30′52″E

Bogdan and Varvara Khanenko Museum of Art
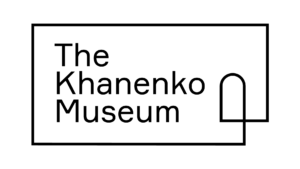

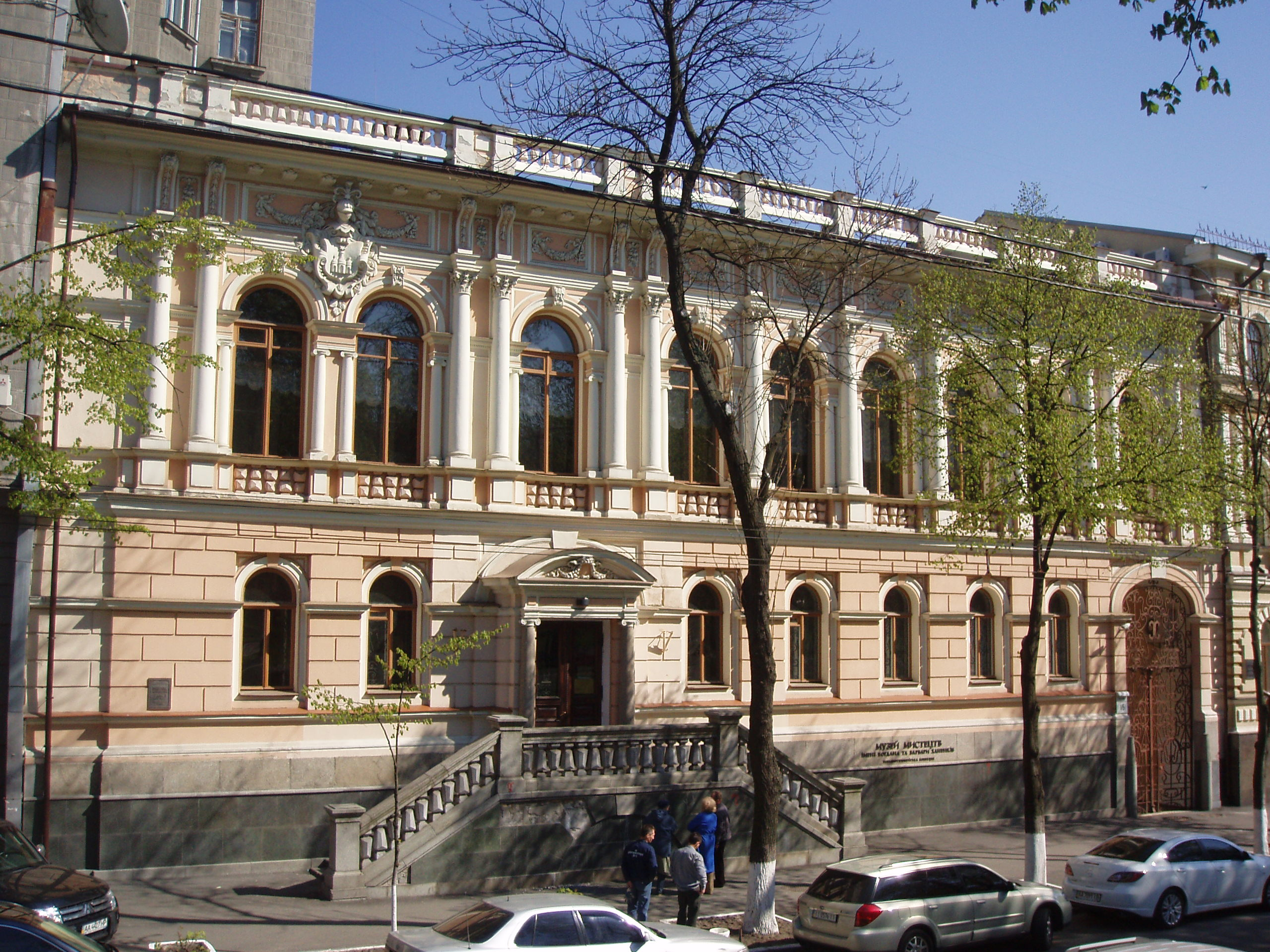
- Established: 1918-1919
- Location: 15 Tereshchenkivska St. Kyiv, Ukraine
- Director: Yuliia Vahanova
- Website: http://khanenkomuseum.kiev.ua/en

Immovable Monument of National Significance of Ukraine
- Official name: Будинок першого приватного музею Богдана і Варвари Ханенків (Building of the first private museum of Bohdan and Varvara Khanenko)
- Type: History
- Reference no.: 260049-Н

The Khanenko Museum (Note: officially titled Ukrainian: Національний музей мистецтв імені Богдана та Варвари Ханенків, lit. 'Bohdan and Varvara Khanenko National Museum of Arts') is an art museum located in Kyiv, in Ukraine, which holds the biggest and most valuable collections of European, Asian and Ancient art in the country.

The museum was established in 1919 according to the will of art collector Bohdan Khanenko (1917) and the deed of gift to the Ukrainian Academy of Sciences signed by his wife Varvara in 1918.

The art collection of Bohdan and Varvara Khanenko, distinguished Ukrainian collectors and philanthropists of the late 19th and early 20th century, is the core of the museum's holdings.

The museum comprises two late 19th-century buildings of great historical and artistic value located on Tereshchenkivska Street. The Khanenkos' mansion houses the permanent exhibition of European fine and decorative arts from the 14th through the 18th century. A group of unique early Byzantine "Sinai" icons created in the 6th and the 7th century has been on display in a separate room of the building since 2004. On the first floor of the mansion is the permanent exhibition of Ancient art.

The other museum building located nearby was the property of the Sakhnovskys, the Khanenkos' close relatives, until 1919. Since 2006, it has housed the permanent exhibition of Asian art. The four rooms are dedicated to the art of Buddhism and Islam as well as that of China and Japan.

The Khanenko Museum's collection includes original artworks by outstanding European masters, such as Pieter Paul Rubens, Gentile Bellini, Juan de Zurbarán, Jacques-Louis David, François Boucher.

The museum holds highly valuable collections of European sculpture and decorative art, beautiful and rare pieces of Iranian, Tibetan, Chinese and Japanese fine and decorative art, as well as small but worthwhile collections of Ancient Greek, Roman and Egyptian art.

In total, the Khanenko Museum's holdings comprise more than 25,000 items. Almost 1,000 selected artworks are displayed permanently.

== History ==
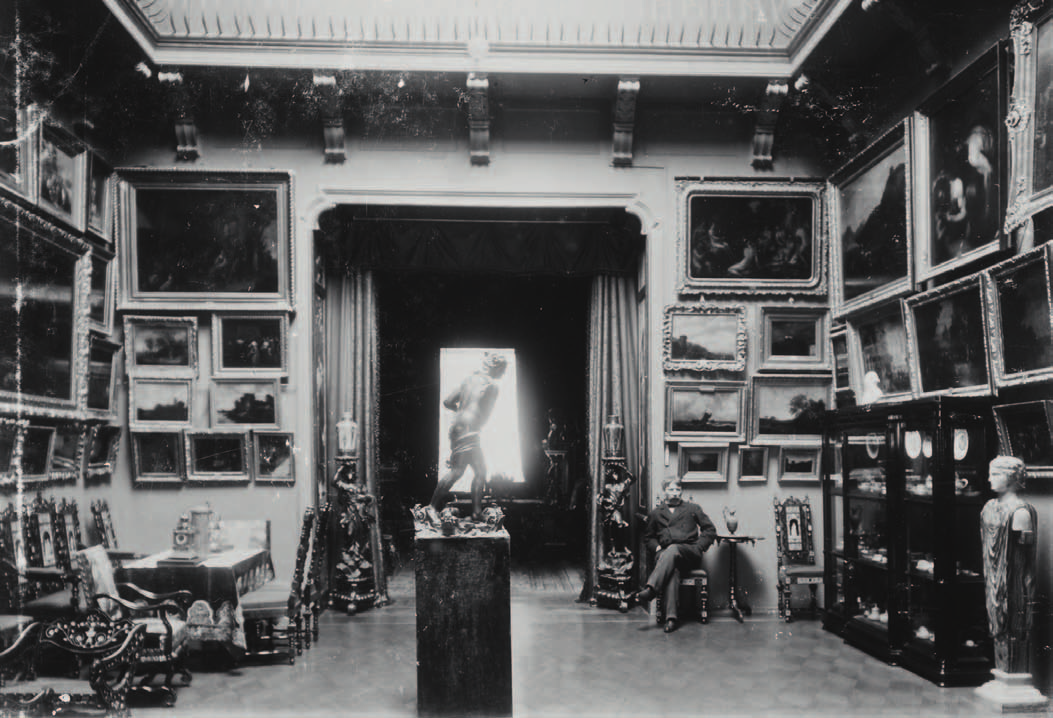
Bohdan Khanenko in one of the halls of the museum 1900s

=== Early history, 1874–1919 ===
The Khanenko Museum traces its history to the 1870s, when Bogdan Khanenko (1849–1917) met and, later on, married Varvara Tereshchenko (1852–1922).

Bohdan Khanenko came from an aristocratic Ukrainian family of the Khanenkos. He was born in Lotoki village in Chernihiv region into the family of a nobleman Ivan Khanenko. Upon completing his education in Moscow, Bohdan went on to work in Saint Petersburg and Warsaw. When in Saint Petersburg, he developed an interest in the art of Old Masters. During the late 1880s, the Khanenkos settled in Kyiv. Bohdan got engaged in the city's cultural and social life as well as the Tereshchenko brothers' business activities. Khanenko successfully led the project of establishing the first public museum in Kyiv (consecrated in 1904). Bohdan donated a large part of his collection to the new institution, including invaluable archaeological artefacts.

Varvara Khanenko (née Tereshchenko) was the eldest daughter of the prominent Ukrainian businessman and philanthropist Nykola Tereshchenko. From her father's family she inherited a passion for charity and arts. Varvara Khanenko was fond of old Italian painting, maiolica, ancient Ukrainian icon, and folk art. In the late 19th and first decades of the 20th centuries, she was among the Ukrainian cultural figures who started a handicraft movement aimed at giving a new life to folk art traditions.

The young couple dreamed about their private art collection. They travelled extensively throughout Europe, attended auctions, visited private collections, consulted with leading art historians. As a result of a 40-year research, the Khanenkos built an extremely valuable art collection. In the early 20th century, it was considered among the best private collections of arts and antiques in the contemporaneous Russian Empire.

As art collectors, the Khanenkos were interested in European painting, sculpture and applied arts representing the heyday of national artistic schools; rare works of fine arts and traditional crafts from Western, Southern, and Eastern Asia; art of Ancient Egypt, Greece, and Rome; Ukrainian and Russian icon; Ukrainian folk art; European and Eastern weaponry; unique archaeological artefacts and complexes etc.

In the 1900s, the Khanenkos donated several thousand items from their collection to the first public museum in Kyiv. Today these artworks are owned by five national museums in Kyiv.

Several groups of items in the Khanenkos' collection were featured in catalogues published between 1899 and 1907, namely "B.I. and V.N. Khanenko. The collection of paintings of Italian, Spanish, Flemish and other schools", "Russian antiques. Crosses and icons", "Antiques of the Dnipro region", vol. 1-6.

To open a museum of international art in Kyiv was the Khanenkos' life's ambition. This is evident from Bohdan Khanenko's will, signed in April, 1917, a month before his death. In December, 1918, Varvara Khanenko signed the Deed of Gift, by which she handed over the collection, house and library to the Ukrainian Academy of Sciences free of cost. One of the gift's conditions was the indivisibility of the collection.

=== 1919–1945 ===
In June 1919, the Bolshevik government nationalised the property of the Khanenko family. In Bohdan and Varvara's house the State Museum of Art opened. The art historian and artist Georgy Lykomsky (1884–1952) became its first curator. He and Varvara Khanenko combined efforts to create the first exhibitions in the newly established museum. Thanks to the support of Ukrainian scholars, elderly Varvara Khanenko obtained the right to reside at the museum. She chaired the Museum Committee until the end of her life.

However, in 1924, two years after Varvara's death, the names of the Khanenkos were removed from the museum's title "due to the lack of revolutionary services to the proletarian culture".

In the early 1920s, the newly opened museum received artworks from other nationalised collections of aristocrats, such as the Repnins, the Branytskis, the Hudym-Levkovyches, the Sakhnovskis. In 1921, the collection of Asian art was supplemented with a group of Central Asian ceramics of the 9th–12th centuries from Mykhail Stoliarov's collection. In 1925, in accordance with the last will of the Saint Petersburg art collector Vasyl Shchavinskyi, his unique collection of Northern European artworks was transferred to the museum.

During the 1920s, the cultural elite of Soviet Ukraine advocated the idea of the single museum depository and redistribution of museum collections based on the thematic principle. Over the course of this programme's implementation in the 1920s and the 1930s, a significant part of the Khanenkos' collection was handed over to other museums in Kyiv.

Some of the most valuable works of European and Asian arts were seized from the museum during the Soviet Union's campaign for selling the museum treasures abroad. Among them were a French tapestry featuring the Adoration of the Magi, paintings by European Old Masters, including the diptych "Adam and Eve" (1512) by Lucas Cranach the Elder, a collection of golden items from the Kyivan Rus period, works of Iranian art (the 7th-century silver chalice and the 13th-century aquamanile in the shape of a Zebu cow and a predator). Only on one occasion in the early 1930s Ukrainian cultural figures prevented the seizure of a Persian carpet of the 16th or the 17th century. The former museum with its encyclopaedic collection acquired a far narrower specialisation — that in Western and Eastern art.

In the second part of the 1930s, the Kyiv Museum Town at the Kyiv Pechersk Lavra transferred several valuable collections of sacred art to the museum. In 1936, the institution received a collection of Central and Eastern Asian religious artworks; in 1940 — the world-renowned masterpieces: four early Byzantine encaustic icons dating from the 6th and the 7th centuries.

In the summer of 1941, World War II began on the Soviet Union's territory, the most valuable part of the collection was evacuated to the city of Ufa (then the Bashkir ASSR, now Bashkortostan). The nazi looted the most precious artworks left in Kyiv and smuggled them out of Ukraine during their retreat in 1943. Nowadays, the Khanenko Museum strives to locate and repatriate the stolen items.

The museum maintains public awareness of the losses caused by the Nazi occupation of Kyiv. In 1998, it published a catalogue featuring the items which were looted and taken out of the country between 1941 and 1943.

=== 1945–1998 ===
The postwar period saw several important acquisitions. Over the course of the 1950s, Taisiia Zhaspar donated and sold more than 350 works of classical Chinese painting, sculpture, and decorative arts. In 1969, the museum purchased 41 works of Buddhist art from the Moscow art collector Valeriian Velichko. During the 1970s, the museum systematically built up its collection of Japanese netsuke figurines (about 70 items). Other acquisitions included paintings by the USA artist Rockwell Kent (1882–1971) known for his realistic landscapes.

From 1986 to 1998 the museum was closed for capital renovation.

=== 1998–2020 ===
In the mid-1990s, the new management led by Vira Vynohradova started the era of restoration of historical memory and intensive development in the history of the museum. In 1998, the new permanent exhibition of European art of the 14th through the 19th centuries opened in the restored Khanenkos' mansion. In 1999, the founders' names re-took their places in the official title of the museum: "The Bohdan and Varvara Khanenko Museum of Art".

In 2004, the permanent display of Byzantine "Sinai" icons of the 6th and the 7th centuries opened in the museum. Two years later, the first extensive permanent exhibition of Asian art was launched in a neighbouring building. In 2018, an Ancient art exhibition was arranged in the former "The Khanenkos' Bureau" on the ground floor of the mansion. Over the course of the 1990s and the 2000s, the Asian art collection was supplemented with valuable donations from Halyna Scherbak, Vasyl Novytskii, and Oleksandr Feldman.

The first decades of the 21st century are characterised by intense research into the museum's history and collection. A new philosophy and practices of museum education and services have been emerging. The first large-scale visitor study was conducted. Special attention has been paid to the needs of families, children, and young adults. The museum has introduced inclusive programs and services for people with disabilities, aged visitors, the homeless and visitors with low income, mothers and fathers on parental leave, etc.

== Collection ==
Since the establishment of the museum, its collection has increased by several times. Today it encompasses the collections of European, Asian and Ancient fine and decorative arts as well as the group of early Byzantine "sinai" icons.

European art is represented by notable works of painting, sculpture, graphic and applied arts produced in Italy, France, Germany, the Netherlands, and Spain between the 14th and the 19th centuries. In particular, the museum's collection of paintings includes "Orpheus and Eurydice" by Jacopo da Sellaio, "The God of The Scheldt River, Cybele, and the Goddess of The City of Antwerp" by Peter Paul Rubens, "Still Life with a Chocolate-Grinder" by Juan de Zurbaran, "Burial of A Monk" by Alessandro Magnasco, "Lovers, or Prodigal Son and a Prostitute" by Pierre Louis Goudreaux, "Portrait of Stanislaw August Poniatowski" by Élisabeth Vigée Le Brun, along with paintings by artists from the circles of Hieronymus Bosch, the Bellini brothers, Juan Bautista Martínez del Mazo.

Among the most valuable works of plastic art are medieval polychrome wood sculptures, original works by Antonio Canova ("Allegory of Peace"), Sarah Bernhardt ("Ophelia"), Nicolas Cordier ("Galatea"). The European graphic art collection includes prints by Albrecht Dürer, Lucas van Leyden, Rembrandt van Rijn, Giovanni Battista Piranesi, Francisco Goya. The most notable areas of the European applied art collection encompass Italian furniture, the collections of maiolica and porcelain, Limoges enamels and Flemish tapestries.

Asian art is represented by the pieces of Chinese, Japanese and Tibetan Buddhist art along with artworks from Islamic regions and countries (Iran, Turkey, Central Asia, and Muslim Spain).

The most notable areas of Asian art collection include Chinese paintings, ceramics (grave figurines of the Tang era, stonewares of the Song period as well as various porcelain items), bronze items, examples of lacquerware and stone carving, Japanese woodcut prints (ukiyo-e), tsuba (artfully decorated traditional sword guards) as well as netsuke miniature sculptures. The outstanding works of Islamic arts include Iranian lustre-painted pottery and metalwork, miniature paintings, carpets etc. Tibetan art is represented by the collection of religious sculptures, ritual objects, and thangka scroll paintings.

The group of early Byzantine icons comprises four items created in the 6th and 7th centuries, not long before the Iconoclasm began. These are "John the Baptist" (6th century), "The Virgin with the Child" (6th century), "Saints Sergius and Bacchus" (7th century), "A Male Martyr and a Female Martyr" (7th century). The museum also holds later icons from the Byzantine Empire and Cyprus.

The Ancient art collection includes works of Ancient Egyptian sculpture (in particular, "God Thoth as a baboon"), Ancient Greek pottery, Etrurian sculptures, Ancient Roman portrait busts and glassware.

== Gallery of some works on display ==
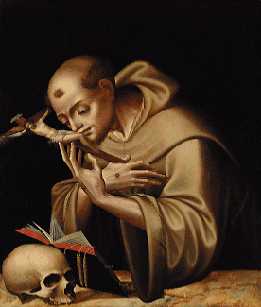
Luis de Morales, St Francis, 16th century

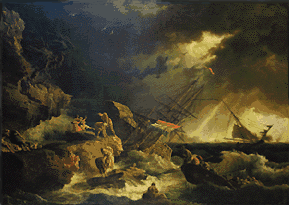
Claude Joseph Vernet, A Storm in the Sea, 18th century

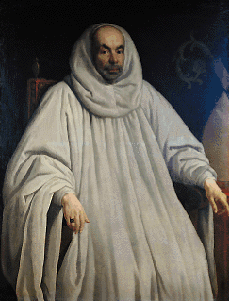
Claudio Coello, Portrait of a Carusian Bishop, 18th century

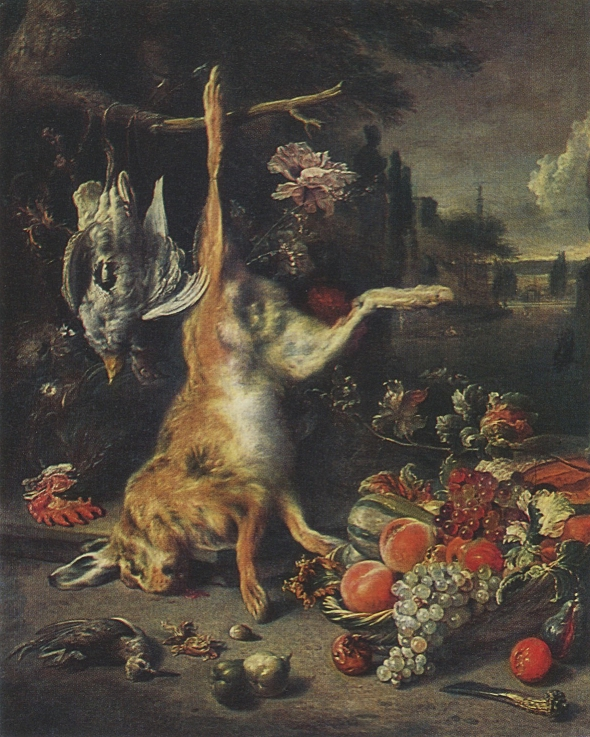
Jan Weenix, Still Life with Dead Hare, 17th century

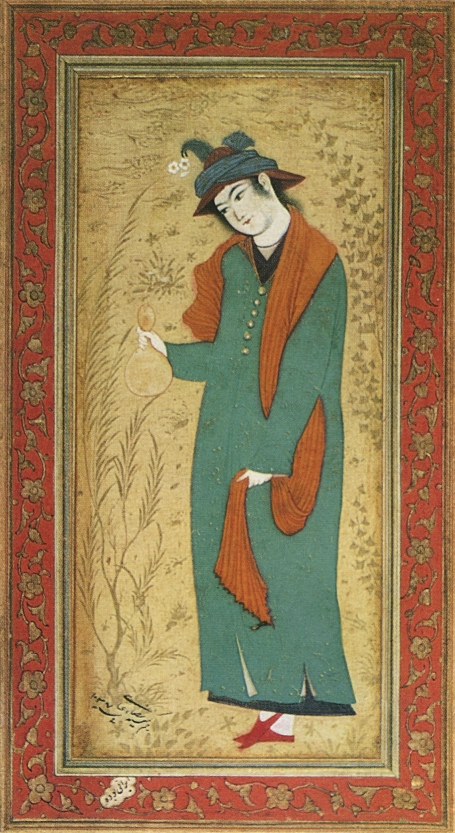
Reza Abbasi, Cup-bearer. Miniature, 16th or 17th century

== Buildings ==
In compliance with the Last will of Bohdan Khanenko (1917) and the Deed of Gift signed by Varvara Khanenko (1918), their Kyiv estate at 15 Tereshchenkivska Street became an art museum. By decision of the Kyiv city authorities in 1986, a neighbouring house at 17 Tereshchenkivska Street, the historic house of the Sakhnovskis, the Khanenkos' close relatives, became part of the Khanenko Museum. In 2006, a renewed permanent exhibition of Asian arts opened on the first floor of the house.

=== The Khanenkos' Mansion ===
The historic mansion of Bohdan and Varvara Khanenko located in Kyiv at 15 Tereshchenkivska Street is one of the city's precious architectural landmarks. Its history goes back to the early 1880s, when the Ukrainian "sugar king" Nykola Tereshchenko, the father of Varvara Khanenko, purchased a large plot of land with a three-storeyed house on a new Kyiv street, which was then called Oleksiivska. In 1882–1888, another house was constructed on the vacant part of the site, with two storeys on the front façade and three storeys from the courtyard. The project was most likely designed by Robert-Friedrich Meltzer. In 1888, Nykola Tereshchenko transferred the newly built house and this part of the land to his eldest daughter, Varvara.

In 1891, the Khanenkos commissioned the completion of the mansion's left wing (Olexander Kryvosheyev's project). In 1889–1890, Bohdan and Varavara were engaged in designing the interiors. Intended for displaying their rich art collection, the house was conceived by the owners as a kind of "art history theatre".

The Khanenkos were inspired by the European fashion for historical stylization in architecture. They commissioned an artistic design "in the spirit" of a particular historical era for almost every hall of the ground and the first floors. Thus, the mansion had a "Gothic" and "Renaissance" living rooms, a "Rococo" Golden Chamber, a Dutch "Burger" dining room — unique spaces as well as invaluable artistic and intellectual documents of the late 19th century.

Apart from Robert Meltzer, the following architects and artists contributed to the design of the Khanenkos' mansion: Leonardo Marconi, Pyotr Boitsov, Wilhelm Kotarbinski, Mikhail Vrubel, and Adrian Prakhov.

In contrast to the artistic spirit of the ground and the first floor, the Khanenkos' private rooms on the third floor of the house, the so-called mezzanine, were decorated very modestly, even ascetically.

Judging from archival photos of the house, artworks in the Khanenkos' private art gallery were often rearranged depending on the changes in the couple's interests or their new acquisitions.

In 1919, Varvara Khanenko and the art historian Georgy Lukomsky curated the first public museum exhibition which opened on the ground and the first floors of the mansion.

Varvara Khanenko lived in the rooms of the second mezzanine floor for the rest of her life (until May 1922). In 1930–1934, the first museum exhibition of Islamic arts, curated by Maria Vyazmitina, opened on the second floor of the house.

According to unconfirmed data, during World War II, the Nazi Officers Club was housed in the museum. Then the mansion was damaged, which made the museum's management dismantle part of the Khanenkos' historic architectural settings. As a result, the interior of the Delft Dining Room was almost completely lost.

After substantial restoration and conservation works on the Khanenkos' mansion conducted in 1986–1998, most of the houses' unique old interiors were saved and restored. The coat of arms of the Khanenko family re-took its original place on the front façade between the windows of the first floor.

=== The Sakhnovskis' house ===
The Sakhnovskis' historic house located at 17 Tereshchenkivska Street was commissioned by Adelaida Sulymovska and built in 1878. The project was designed by the architect Volodymyr Nikolayev. The house is a three-storey building if faced from the street, and has five floors if faced from the yard. Unlike the neighbouring Khanenkos' mansion, which was constructed a decade later, it was conceived as a rental apartment house.

The facade is designed in the eclectic style with Neo-Renaissance elements, namely the round medallions with sculptural human heads decorating the windows of the first floor, as well as Corinthian columns and pilasters adorning the windows of the first and the second floors. In 1880, it was in this very house that telephony was first tested in Kyiv.

In September 1882, Adelaida Sulymovska sold the plot of land with the house to the wealthy entrepreneur Nikola Tereshchenko. He divided the plot into two smaller parts. In 1899 or 1900, Tereschenko presented his youngest daughter Yefrosyniia, who married Volodymyr Sakhnovskyi and took his surname, with No.17 house. The couple lived in the mansion until 1917, when the husband died. In 1919, the house was purchased by the attorney Serhii Pistriak, who became its last private owner. After its nationalisation the house was used as an apartment building.

In 1986, by decision of the Kyiv city authorities, No. 17 house was handed over to the Khanenko Museum (then Kyiv Museum of Western and Oriental Art). In 2001–2005, substantial restoration and renovation works were conducted on the mansion. As a result, the rooms of the ground and first floors became suitable for displaying artworks and holding public events. Office and utility rooms are located on the third floor. In addition to this, a covered passage at the first floor level was built to connect the Khanenko Mansion and the Sakhnovski House.

In 2006, the second part of the Khanenko Museum permanent exhibition, "Asian Art", opened in the Sakhnovskis' House. Displayed in the four halls on the first floor are selected artworks in the museum's key Asian collections: "Buddhist and Hindu Art", "Chinese Art", "Islamic Art", "Japanese Art". The ground floor houses the Khanenko Museum's scientific library and temporary exhibition rooms as well as a hallway, a ticket office, a wardrobe, and a shop.

== See also ==
- Tereshchenko family
- Tereshchenko Diamond
- Bogdan Khanenko
- Mikhail Tereshchenko
- Yuliia Vahanova

== Notes and references ==
- Kyiv Sightseeing Guide. 2001. ISBN 966-7022-29-3.
- Andriy Hlazovy (February 1998). "Museum of Western and Oriental Art in Kyiv". Welcome to Ukraine Magazine.
- The Bogdan and Varvara Khanenko Arts Museum at the Museum World of Ukraine: in Russian. in Ukrainian
- Vyacheslav Prokopenko, The gift of Khanenko, Zerkalo Nedeli (The Mirror Weekly), February 4–10, 1995. (in Russian)
