= Wilhelm Kotarbiński =

Polish painter (1848–1921)

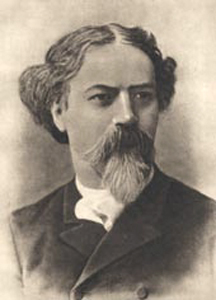
Wilhelm Kotarbiński (c.1900)

Wilhelm Kotarbiński (30 November 1848 – 4 September 1921) was a Polish painter of historical and fantastical subjects, who spent most of his life in Kiev and the Russian Empire.

== Early life and education ==
Kotarbiński was born in Nieborów in Warsaw Province of Congress Poland. His father was an impoverished Polish nobleman who served as a manager for the Radziwiłł estates. He began his studies with Rafał Hadziewicz at the Warsaw School of Art from 1867 to 1871. Afterward, he enrolled at the University of Warsaw, urged on by his parents who were opposed to an artistic career, but stayed for only a short time before borrowing money from his uncle and moving to Italy. The following year, he was able to arrange a stipend from the Imperial Society for the Encouragement of the Arts and enrolled at the Accademia di San Luca, where he studied with Francesco Podesti until 1875, living in poverty and barely surviving a case of typhoid.

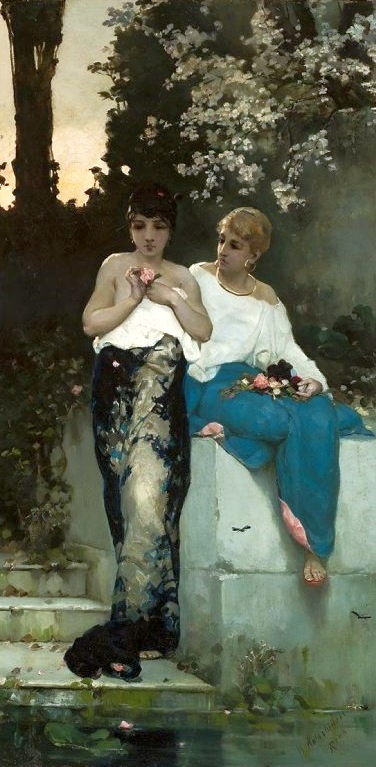
Two Roman Women (1870s)

== Career ==
After graduating, with more help from the Imperial Society, he was able to set up his own studio in Rome and held his first solo exhibition. His first commission came from the art critic Vladimir Stasov, who engaged him to copy a 14th-century manuscript from the Vatican Museums. He soon acquired many wealthy customers.

In 1888, he left Italy, after being invited by his friend, Pavel Svedomsky, to come to Kiev and work on an upcoming major public project. He married a distant cousin, acquired property in Minsk Governorate, and began painting in the local churches, but visited Kiev frequently. Although he was Catholic, he did decorative work at the Orthodox St Volodymyr's Cathedral from 1889 to 1894, with several other well-known Russian and Ukrainian artists, notably Viktor Vasnetsov. Under the supervision of Adrian Prakhov, an expert on old Russian and Byzantine art, he worked on 84 individual figures and 18 full paintings, including a large painting of the transfiguration of Christ. During this time, he became friends with the Prakhov family and was said to be enamored of Prakhov's wife, Emilia. This, combined with his frequent and lengthy absences, eventually led to an estrangement from his wife, who moved to an estate near Vilnius.

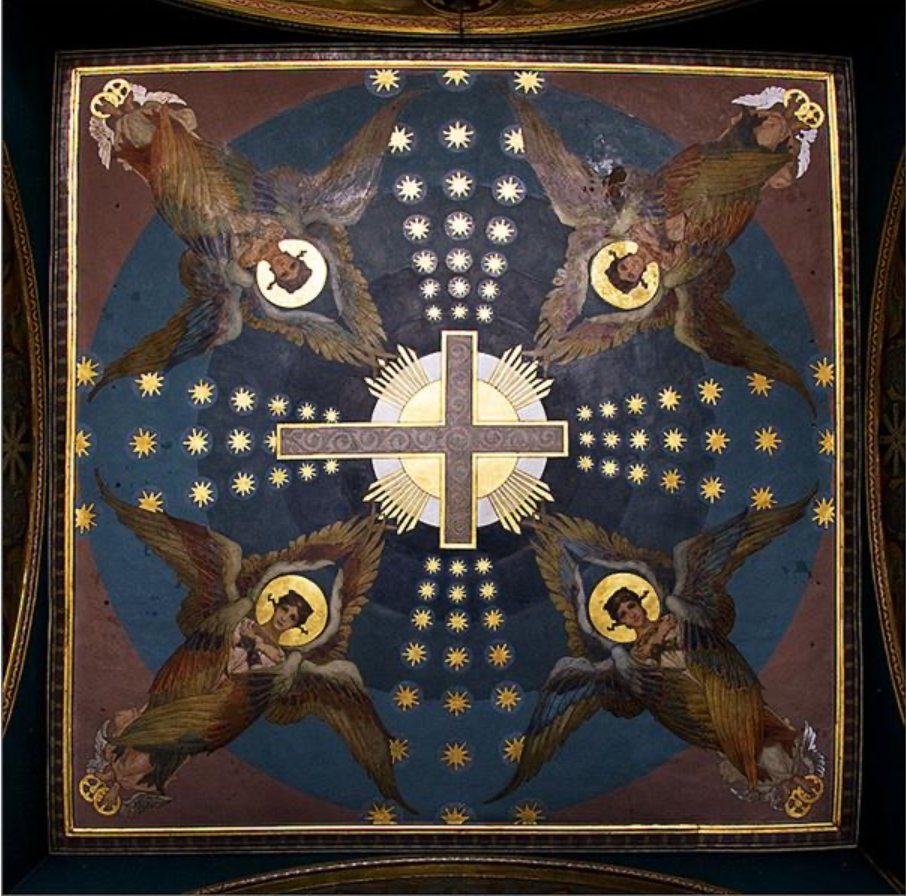
Ceiling at St. Volodymyr Cathedral in Kyiv, Ukraine

He also did murals in private mansions, including those of the philanthropist Mykola Tereshchenko, which is now the National Museum Taras Shevchenko, and Tereshchenko's son-in-law, Bohdan Khanenko, which now holds an art museum named after him and his wife Varvara.

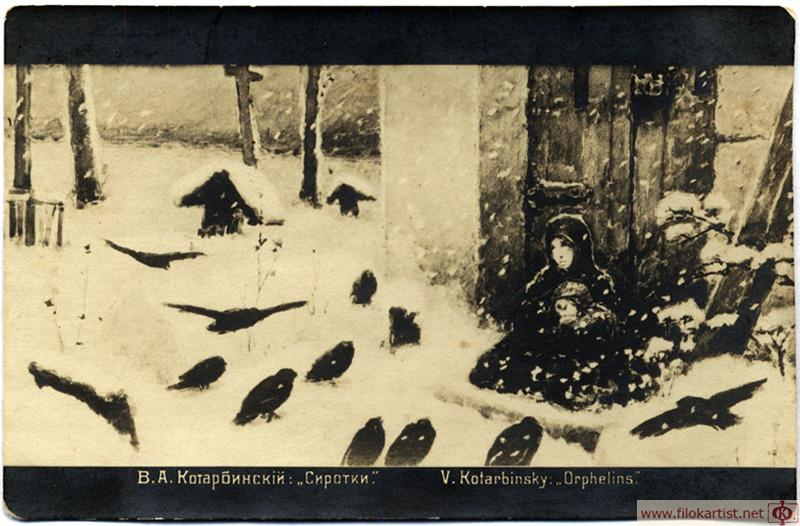
Orphans (a postcard, c.1916)

In 1890, he joined the Union of South Russian Artists and, in 1893, together with Jan Stanisławski and others, founded the Society of Kiev Painters. He was named an Academician of the Imperial Academy in 1905.

== Later life ==
During World War I, he turned some of his paintings into postcards, which were sold for the benefit of soldiers' families, and created posters promoting donations to help victims of the Polish occupation. Many of his originals have been lost or destroyed and survive only in the form of these postcards.

After the war, he wanted to return to newly independent Poland but was thwarted in his efforts by the unsettled political situation in Russia. He left his estate and rented two rooms at the Hotel Prague in Kiev until 1920, when the hotel was occupied by the Red Army. As a result, he was invited by Emilia (now a widow) to live with her family, for what would turn out to be the final year of his life.

He died on September 4, 1921, in Kiev. Kotarbiński is buried in the Polish section of the Baikove Cemetery.

== Legacy ==
While he remained largely forgotten over the Soviet period, in the post-Euromaidan era interest in Kotarbiński became more visible. The city of Kyiv in Ukraine celebrated the 100th anniversary of his death in 2021 with a special exhibition and a dedicated edition of local art journal, Antikvar. "New times have birthed a new bourgeoisie with new tastes," said one art historian.

== Selected works ==
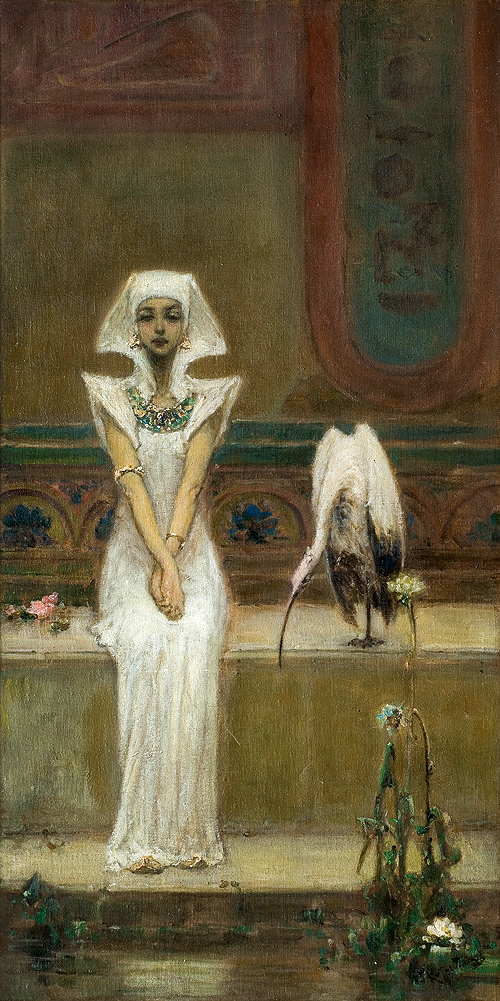
Young Egyptian Woman

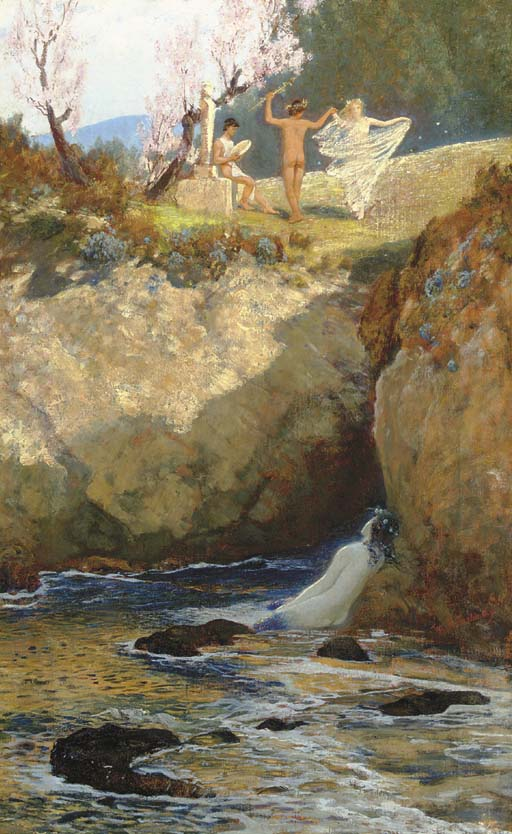
The Dance

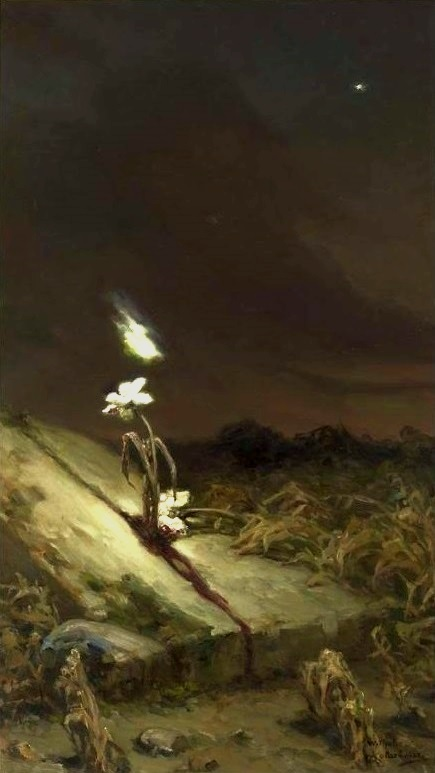
The Grave of a Suicide

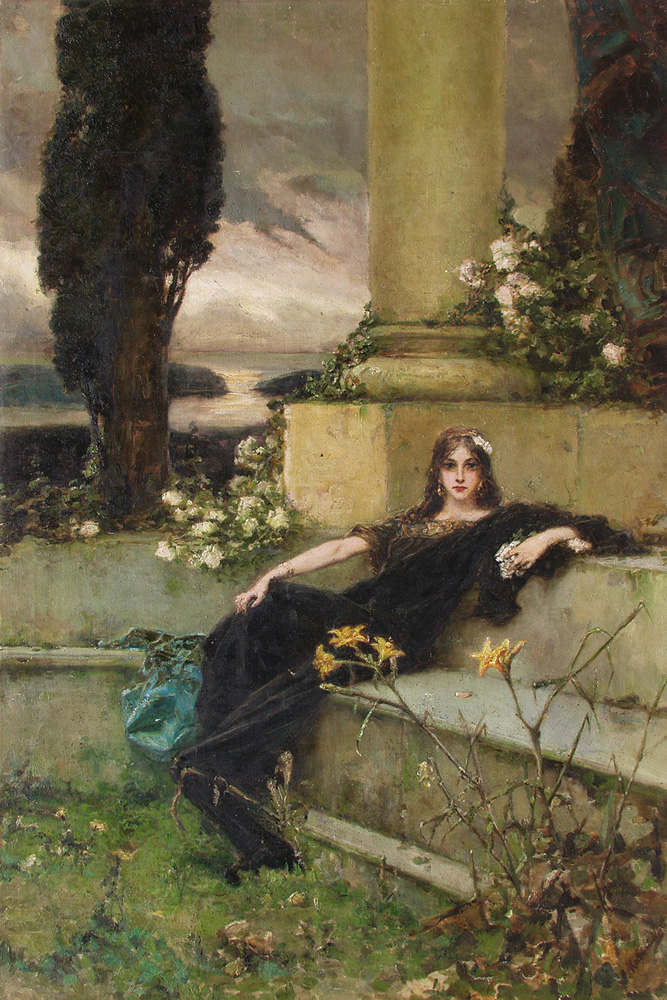
Evening Silence

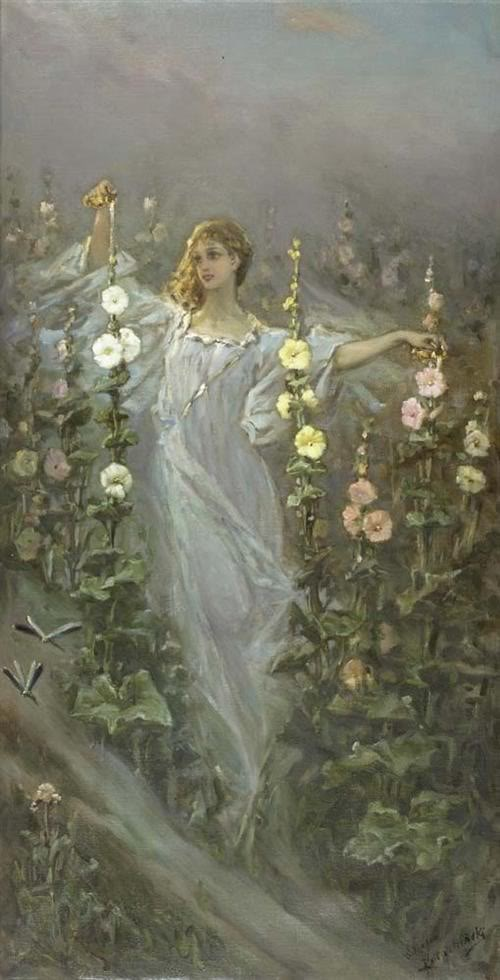
Young Girl

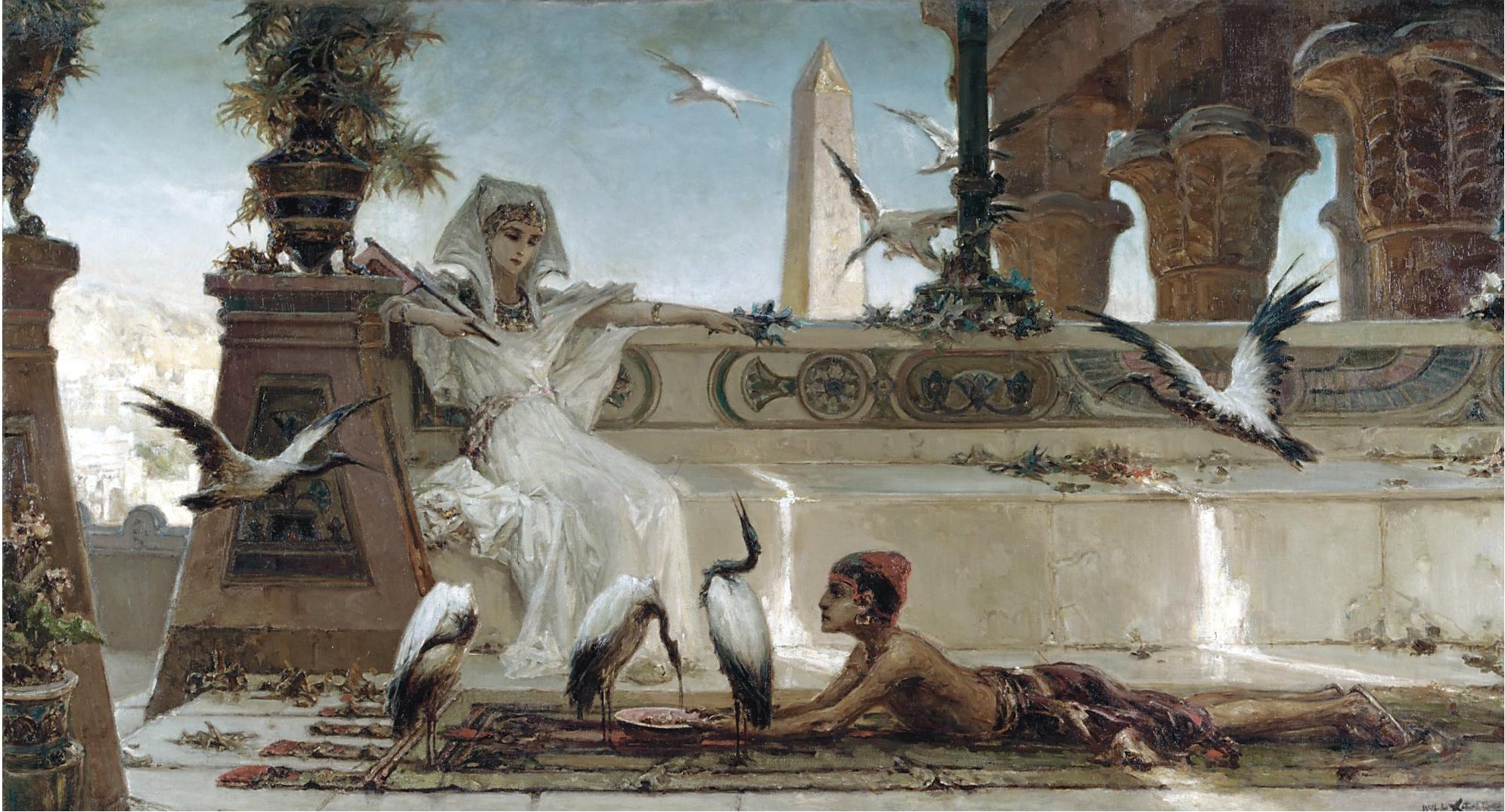
Cleopatra

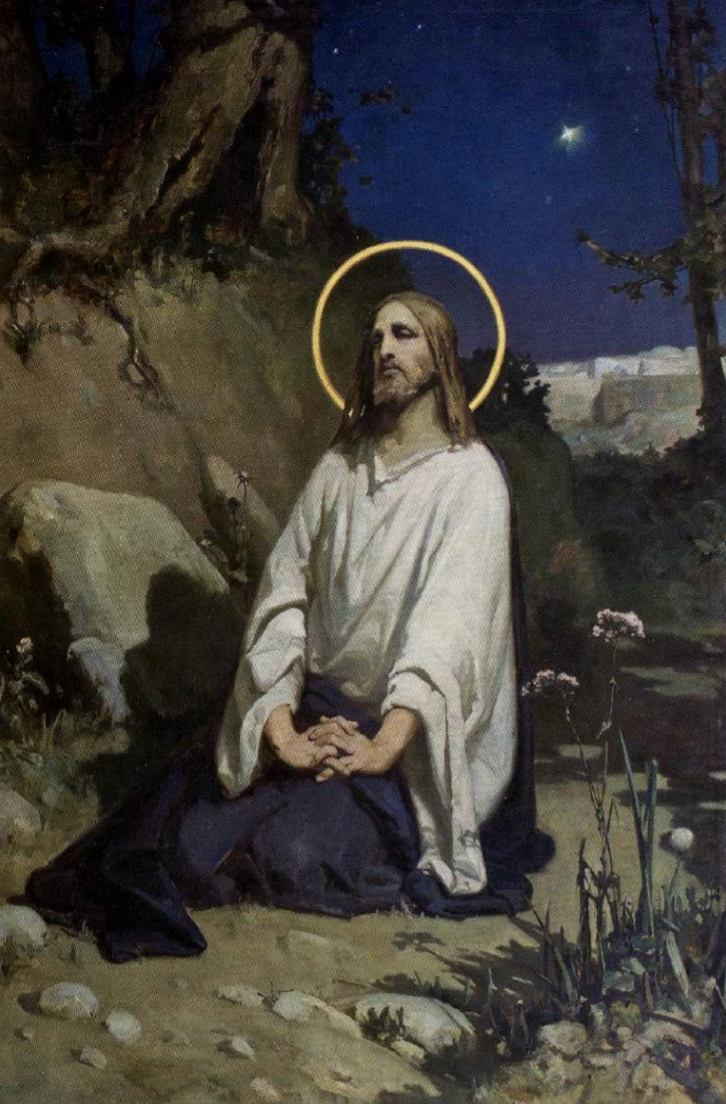
Agony in the Garden

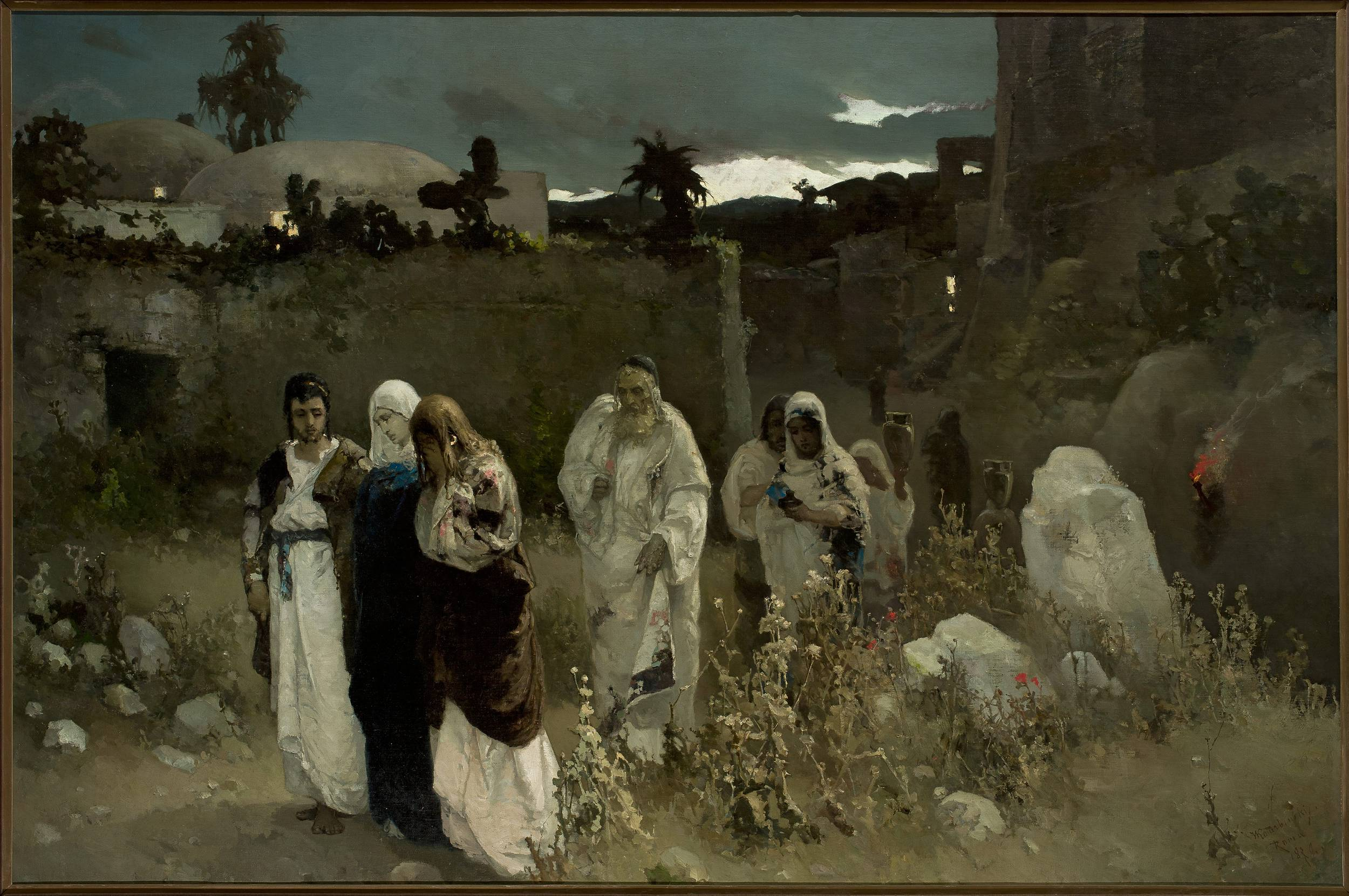
The Three Marys at the Tomb

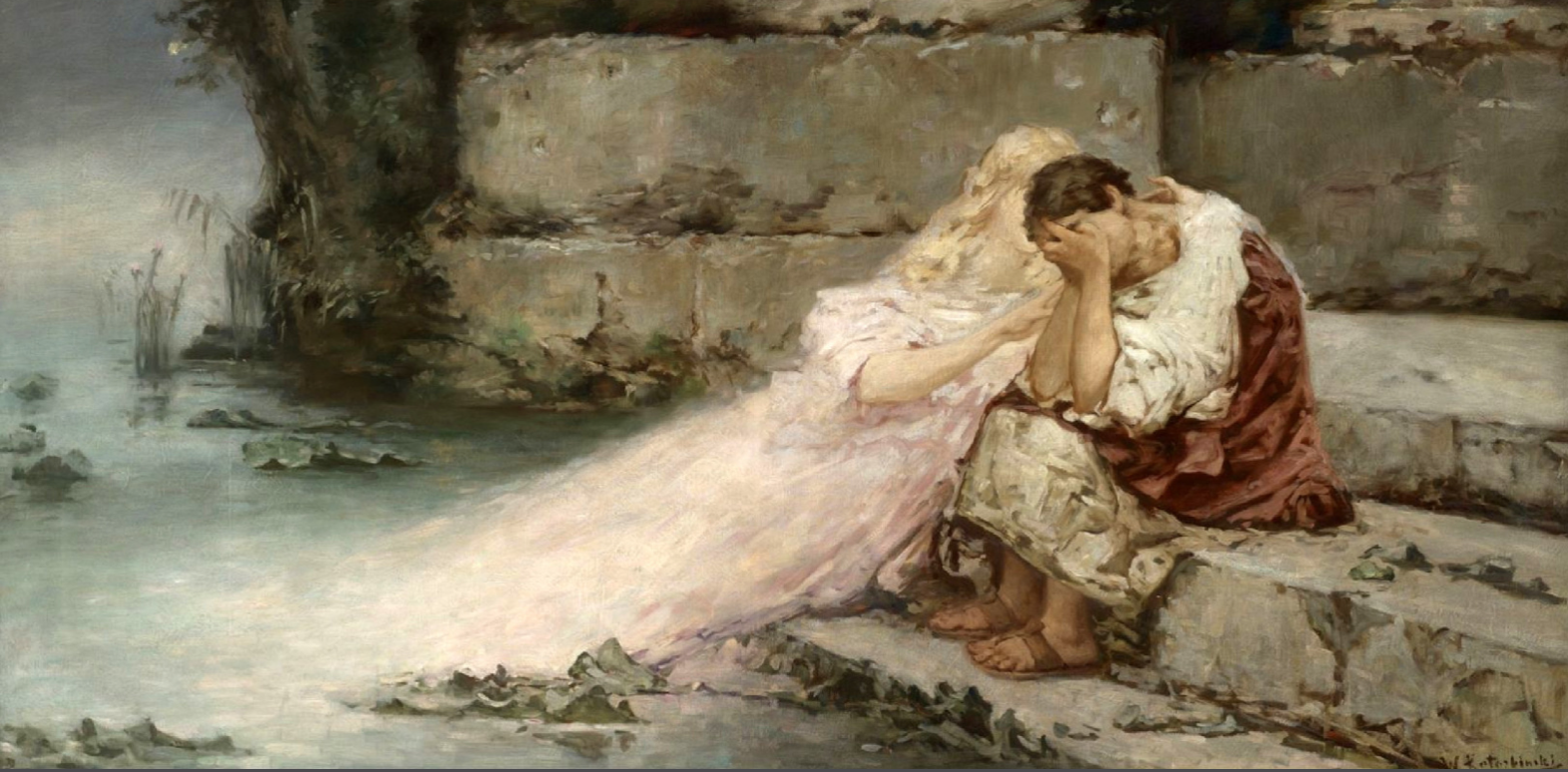
The Comfort of the Fog
