= St Volodymyr's Cathedral =

Orthodox Christian cathedral in Kyiv, Ukraine

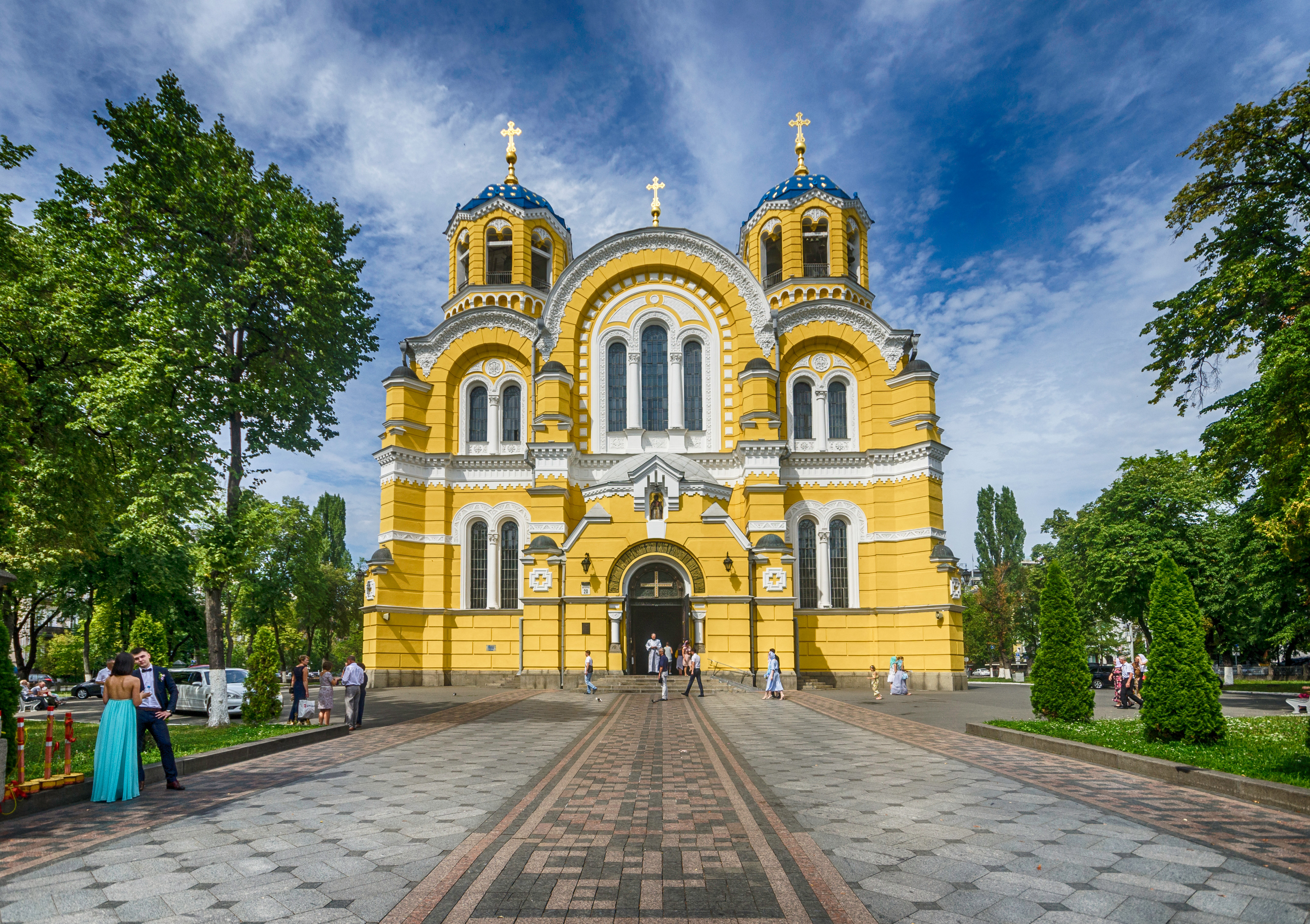
- Front view of St Volodymyr's Cathedral

Religion
- Affiliation: Orthodox Church of Ukraine
- Rite: Byzantine Rite
- Status: Active

Location
- Location: Kyiv, Ukraine
- Interactive map of St Volodymyr's Cathedral
- Coordinates: 50°26′41″N 30°30′32″E

Architecture
- Architect: Alexander Vikentievich Beretti
- Type: cathedral
- Style: neo-Byzantine style
- Completed: 1862–1882

Specifications
- Dome: seven
- Dome height (outer): 49 m (161 ft)
- Materials: Brick

Immovable Monument of National Significance of Ukraine
- Official name: Володимирський собор (St Volodymyr's Cathedral)
- Type: Architecture
- Reference no.: 260158

St Volodymyr's Cathedral (Ukrainian: Володимирський собор [woloˈdɪmɪrsʲkɪj soˈbɔr]) is a cathedral in the centre of Kyiv, and one of the city's major landmarks at the intersection of Ivan Franko Street, the Taras Shevchenko Boulevard, and the Botanical Square. Since the unification council of the Eastern Orthodox churches of Ukraine in December 2018, it has been under the ecclesiastical jurisdiction of the Orthodox Church of Ukraine. Before that, it was the mother church of the Ukrainian Orthodox Church – Kyiv Patriarchate.

== History and description ==
In 1852, Metropolitan Philaret of Moscow suggested a large cathedral should be built in Kyiv to commemorate the 900th anniversary of the baptism of Kyivan Rus' by prince Volodymyr the Great. People from all over the Russian Empire started donating to this cause, so that by 1859 the cathedral fund had amassed a huge sum of 100,000 rubles. The Kyiv Pechersk Lavra (Monastery of the Caves) produced one million bricks and presented them to the cathedral as well. The design was executed in neo-Byzantine style initially by the architects I. Schtrom, P. Sparro, R. Bemhardt, K. Mayevsky, V. Nikolayev. The final version of the design belongs to Alexander Vikentievich Beretti. It is a traditional six-piered, three-apsed temple crowned by seven cupolas. The height to the cross of the main dome is 49 m (161 ft).

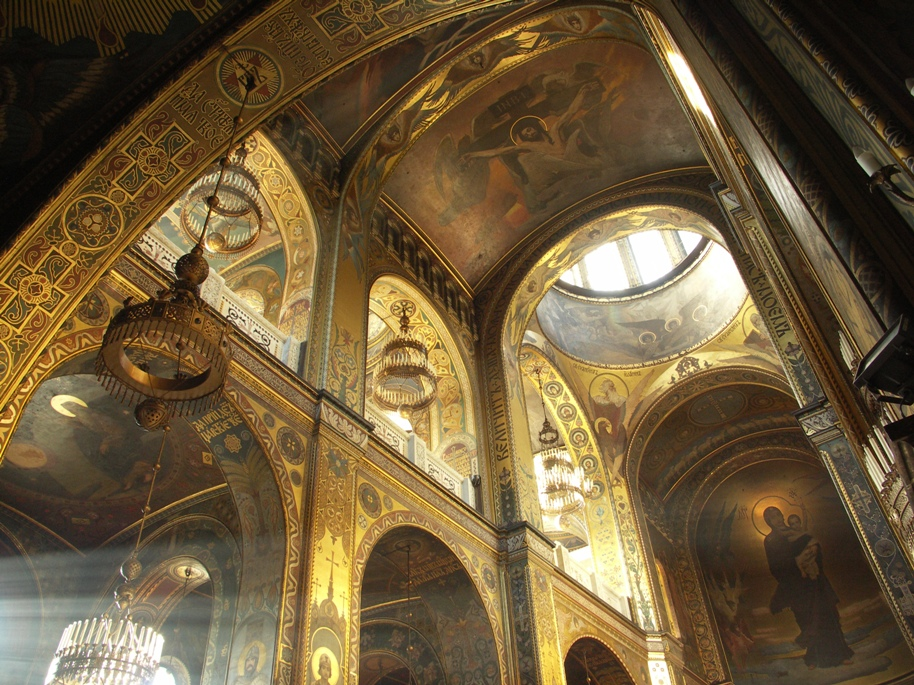
Interior view of the cathedral

The colourful interior of the cathedral is particularly striking. Its mosaics were executed by masters from Venice. The frescoes were created under the guidance of Professor Adrian Prakhov by a group of famous painters: Wilhelm Kotarbiński, Mikhail Nesterov, Mykola Pymonenko, Pavel Svedomsky, Viktor Vasnetsov, Mikhail Vrubel, Viktor Zamyraylo (1868–1939), and others. The painting of the Holy Mother of God by Vasnetsov in the altar apse of the cathedral impresses by its austere beauty.

The entrance door is adorned with relief bronze sculptures of Olga of Kyiv by sculptor Robert Bakh and St. Volodymyr (sculptor H. Zaieman) against a blue background. The iconostasis is carved from the white marble brought from Carrara. The cathedral was completed in 1882, however, the paintings were fully completed only in 1896.

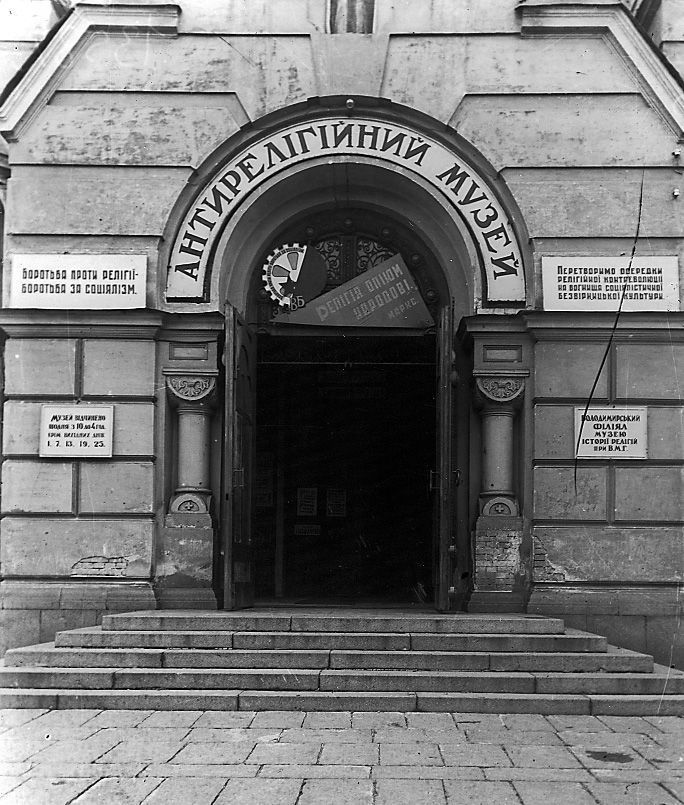
St Volodymyr's Cathedral converted to an anti-religious museum by the Soviet regime in the early 1920s

The cathedral risked damage during the Polish–Soviet War in 1920. During the Soviet period, the cathedral narrowly escaped demolition, but not closure. Until the Second World War, it served as a museum of religion and atheism. The relics of Saint Barbara, a martyr of the 3rd century AD, were transferred to St Volodymyr's from the St. Michael's Golden-Domed Monastery before it was destroyed by the Bolsheviks, and have remained there since.

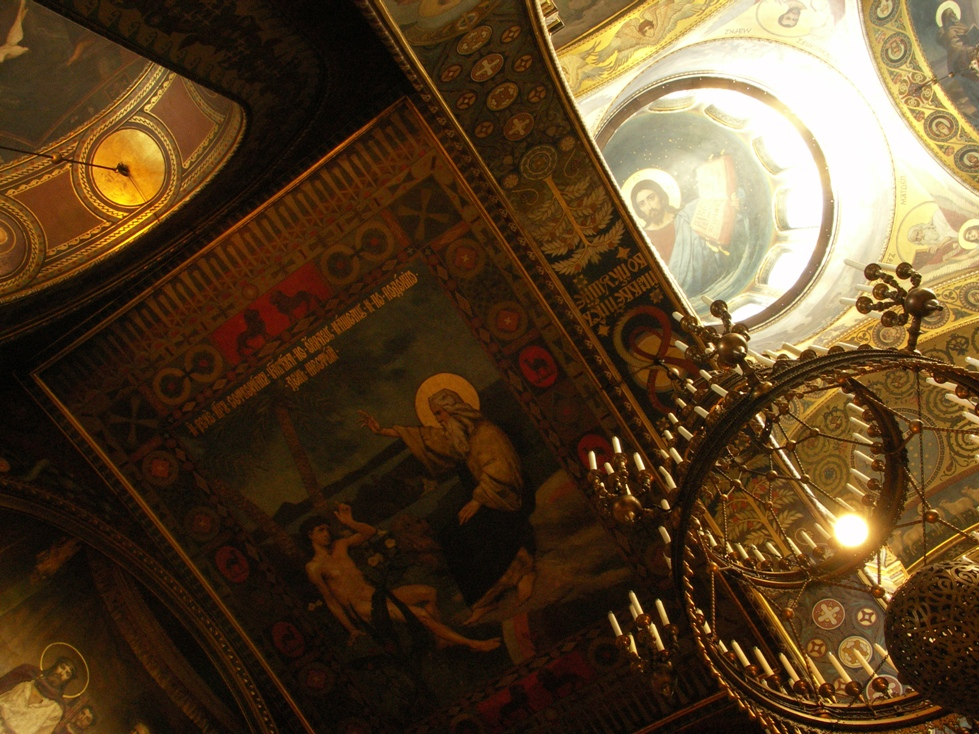
St Volodymyr's Cathedral ceiling

After the war, the cathedral was reopened and has since remained continually open. It was then the main church of the Kyiv Metropolitan See of the Ukrainian Exarchate. The cathedral was one of the few places in the USSR where tourists could openly visit a working Orthodox Church. It saw the revival of Orthodox religion in 1988 when the millennium celebration of the Baptism of Rus' marked a late change in Soviet policy on religion.

After the dissolution of the Soviet Union, St Volodymyr's Cathedral ownership became an issue of controversy between two denominations that both claim to represent Ukrainian Orthodox Christianity – the Ukrainian Orthodox Church, a church with an autonomous status that was, at the time, under the Moscow Patriarchate, and the newly established Ukrainian Orthodox Church – Kyiv Patriarchate, which, ultimately, won the control over the cathedral.

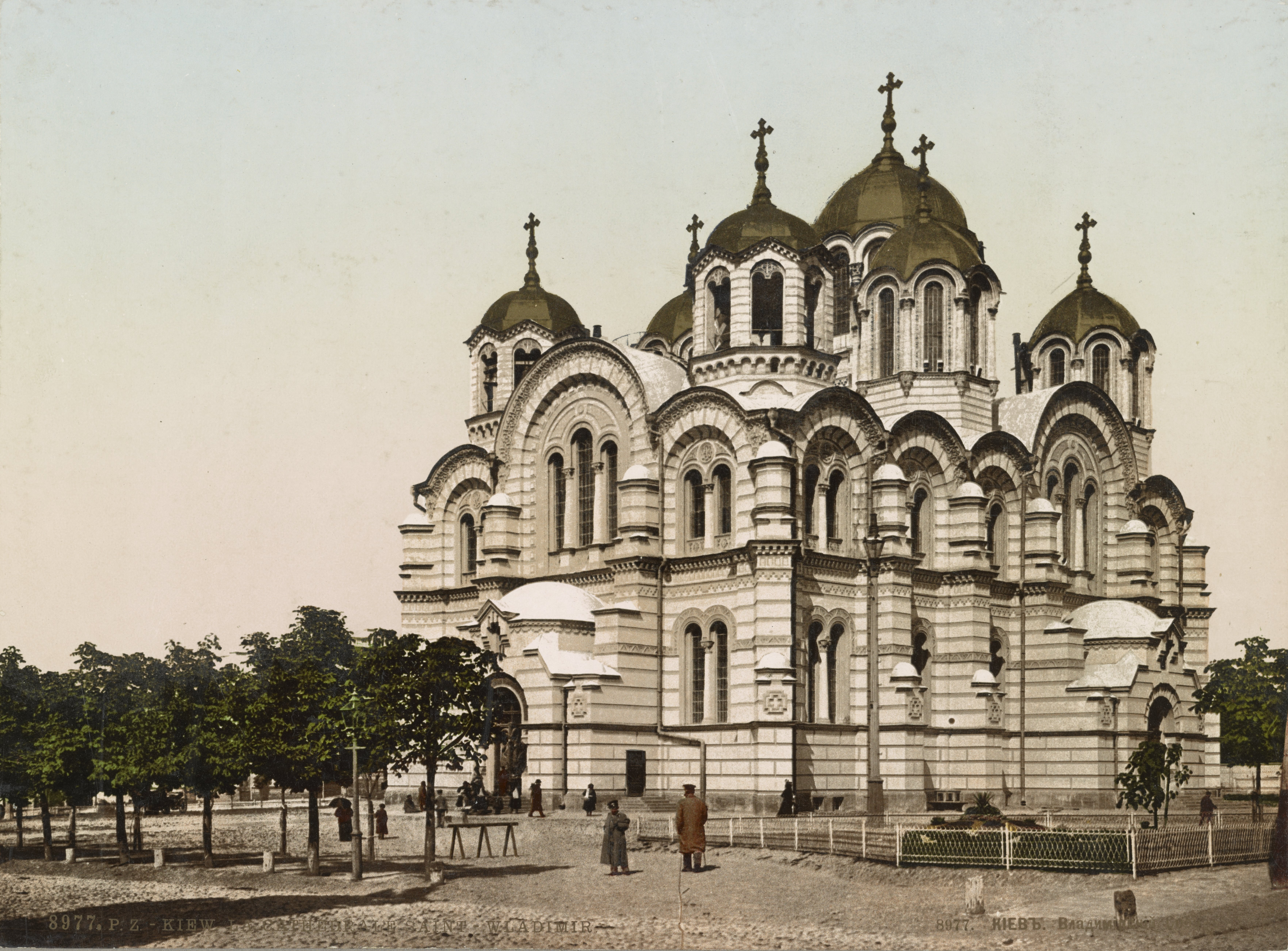
The church in 1896

== Works by Viktor Vasnetsov in the Cathedral ==
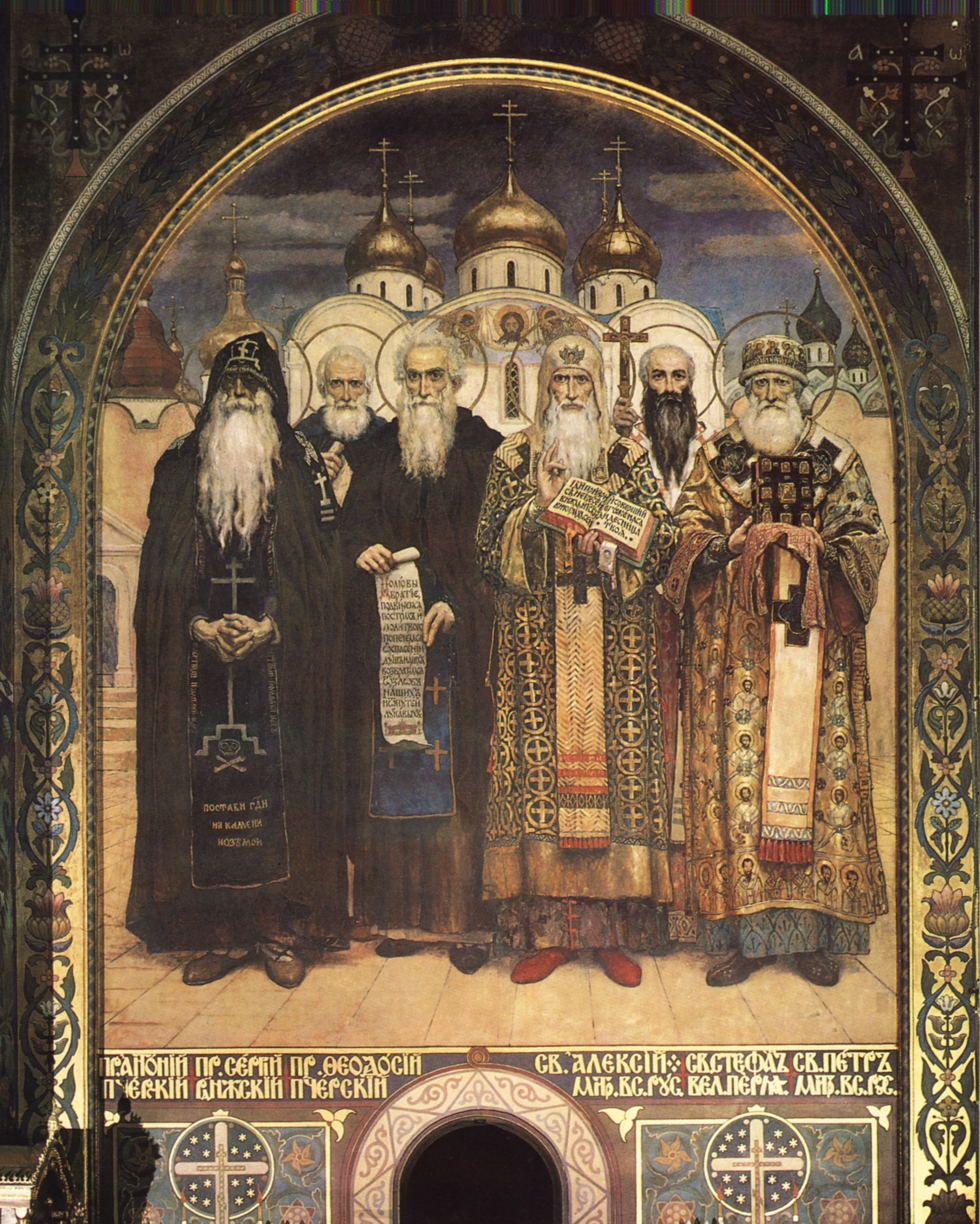
Russian Bishops

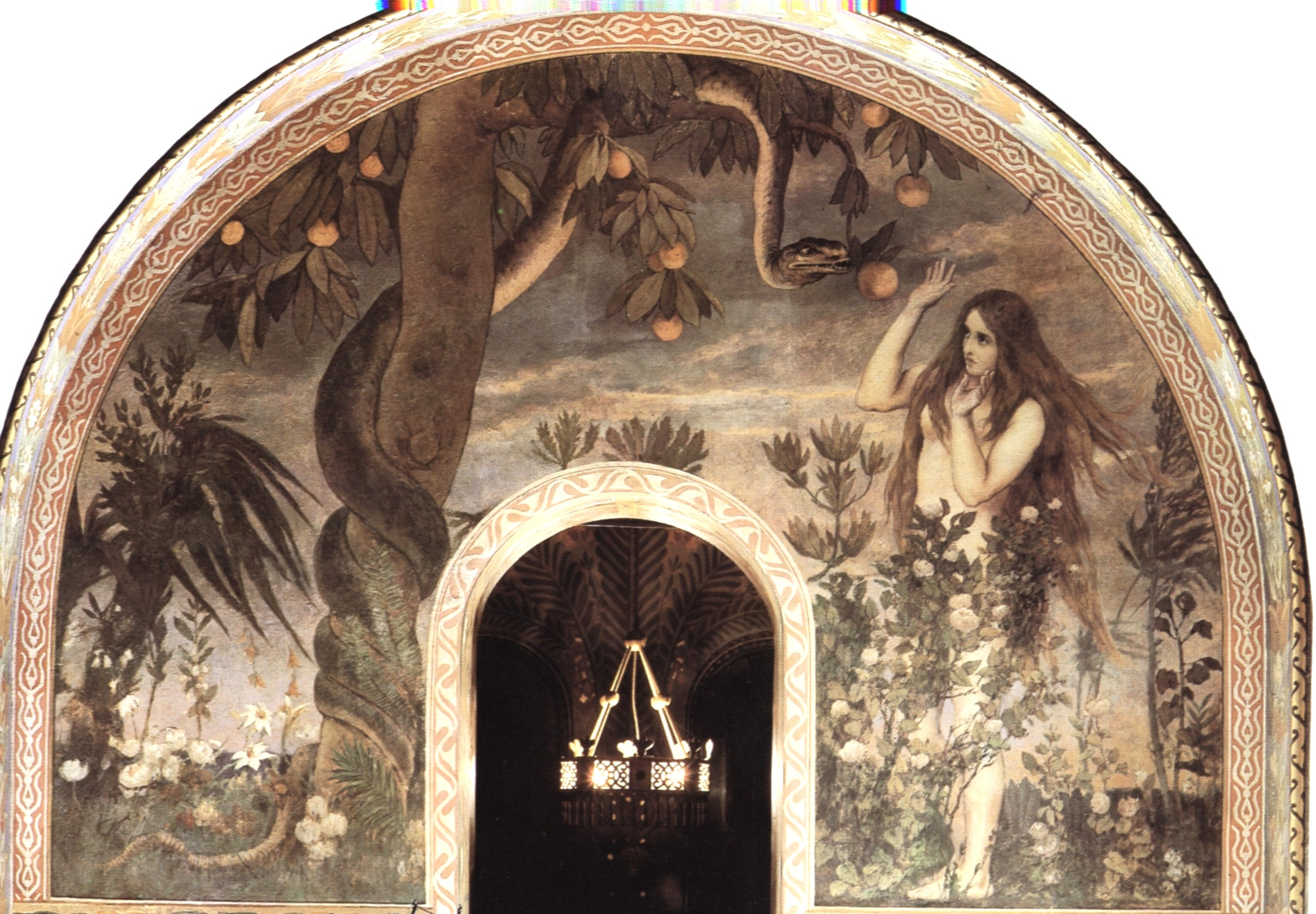
The Temptation

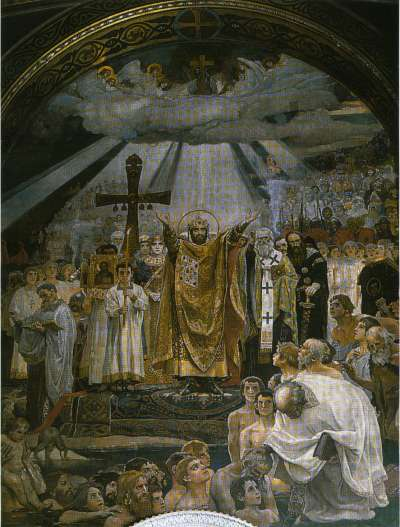
The Baptism of Kyivans.

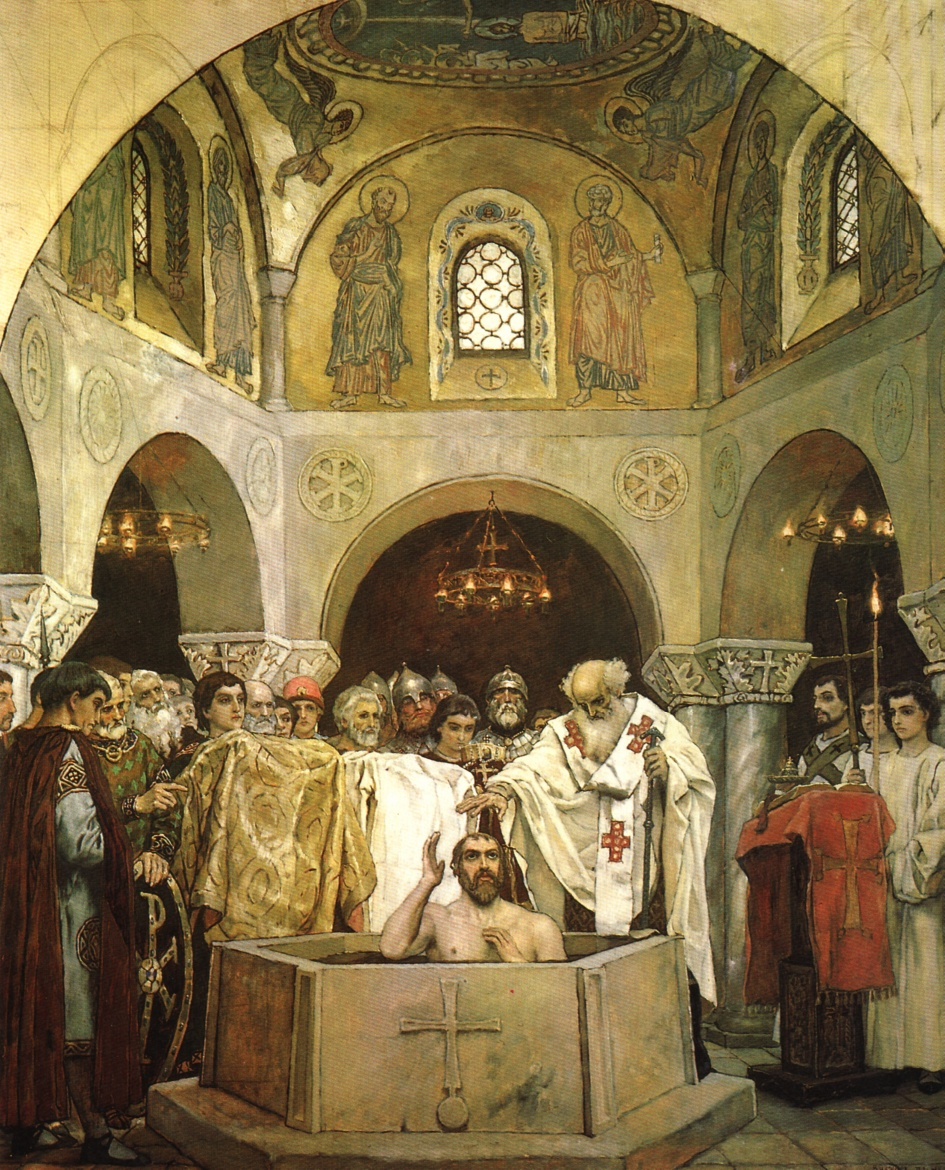
Baptism of Saint Volodymyr

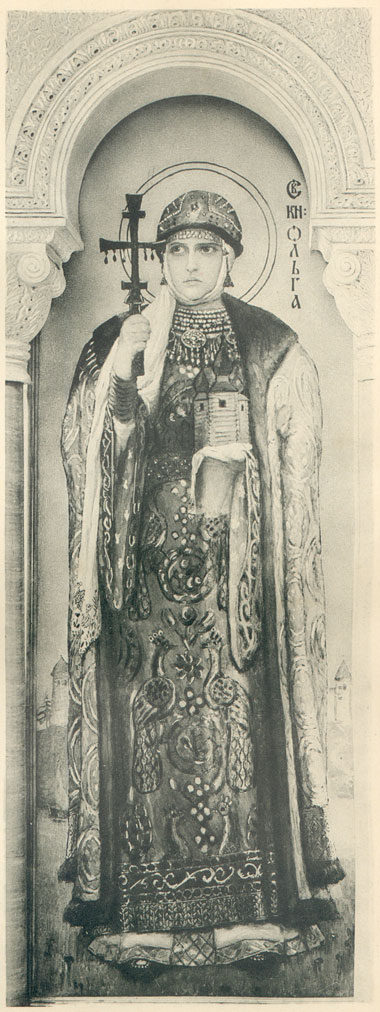
Icon of Saint Olga, later destroyed by the Bolsheviks

== See also ==
- History of Christianity in Ukraine
