= Yuliia Vahanova =

Ukrainian art historian, cultural manager

- Юлія Ваганова
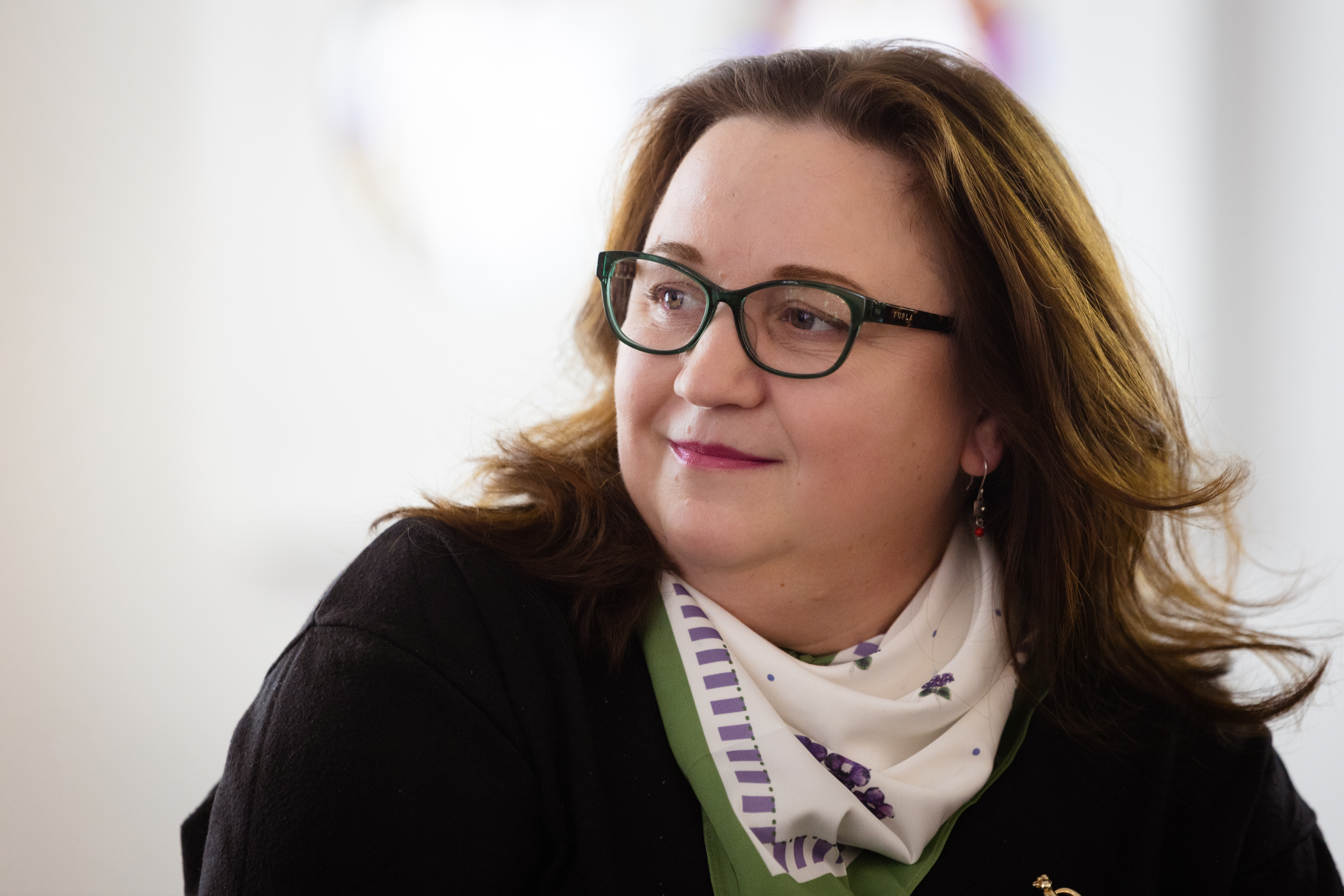
- Born: Yuliia Oleksiivna Vahanova
- Education: National Academy of Arts of Ukraine
- Occupations: Art historian, cultural manager

Yuliia Oleksiivna Vahanova (Ukrainian: Юлія Олексіївна Ваганова) is a Ukrainian art historian and cultural manager. She has been the acting Director General of the Bohdan and Varvara Khanenko National Museum of Art since 2021.

== Biography ==
Vahanova graduated from the National Academy of Arts of Ukraine with a degree in art history.

She worked on the Art-Affisha program of the Yutar TV and radio company, as well as an assistant and director of the Center for Contemporary Art at the National University of Kyiv-Mohyla Academy. Additionally, she has worked as deputy director of the National Art Museum of Ukraine, curator of the National Oleksdandr Dovzhenko Film Centre, and deputy director of museum and exhibition work at Mystetskyi Arsenal.

Since 2021, he has been acting director general of the Bohdan and Varvara Khanenko National Museum of Art.

== Awards ==
Year	Awards	Subject	Result	Ref
2023	Women in Arts	Women in cultural management	Won	
2023	Laurentum	Preservation of cultural heritage	Won	
