= Pavel Svedomsky =

Russian painter

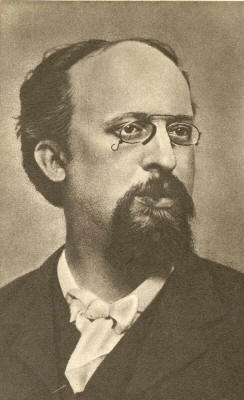
Pavel Svedomsky (date unknown)

Pavel Aleksandrovich Svedomsky (Russian: Па́вел Алекса́ндрович Сведо́мский; 7 June 1849, Saint-Petersburg—27 August 1904, Rome) was a Russian painter and the brother of another artist, Alexander Svedomsky.

Pavel Svedomsky studied first in the Düsseldorf Academy of Arts, then in Munich under Eduard von Gebhardt and Mihály Munkácsy.

== Life ==
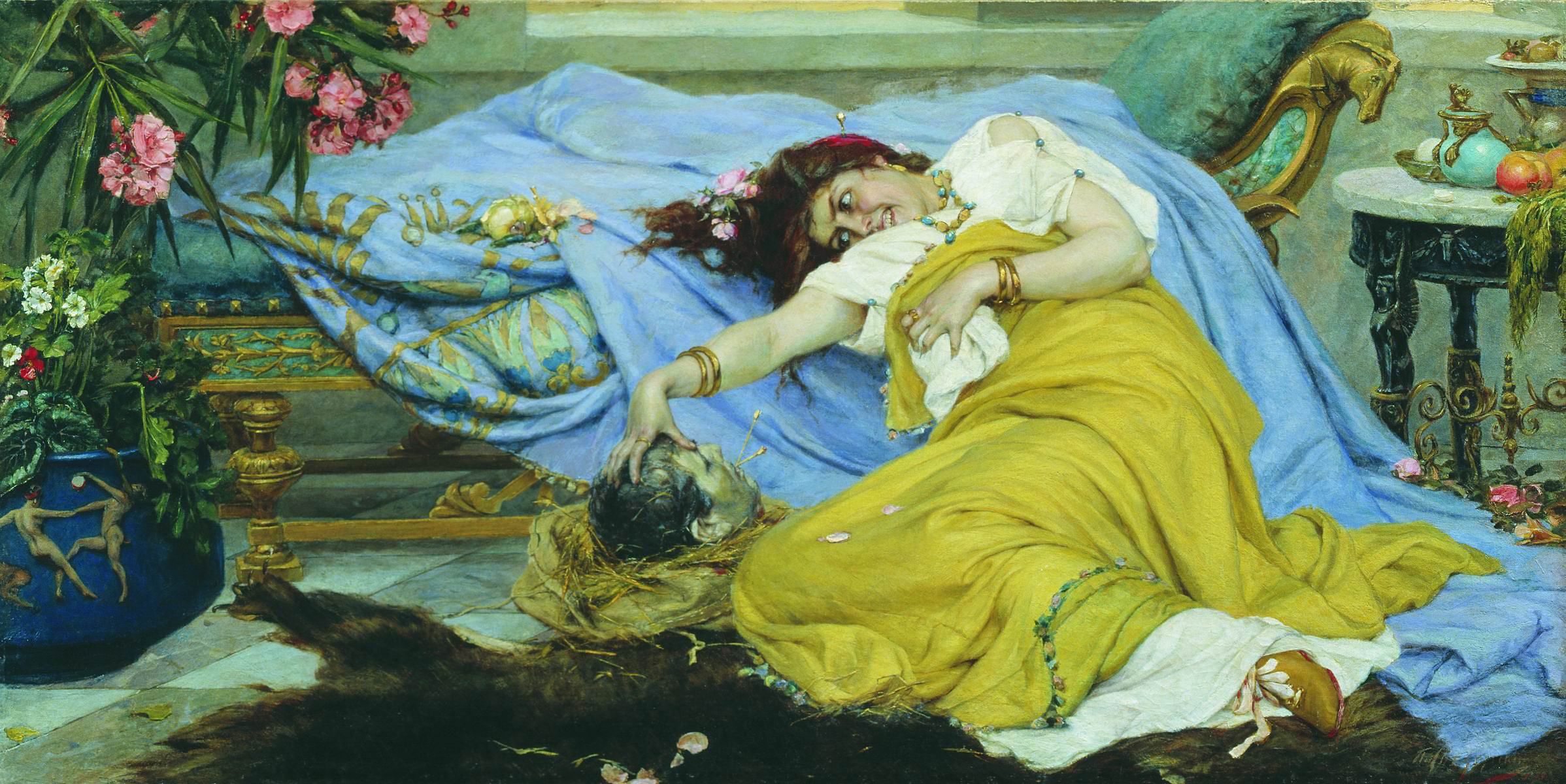
Fulvia With the Head of Cicero

Svedomsky belonged to hereditary Russian nobility. Together with his brother he spent the childhood in the family estate Mikhaylovski Zavod, located in the Perm Guberniya. In 1870 Pavel entered the Düsseldorf Academy of Arts, but studied there only few months. The Svedomskys traveled together across Europe until settling in Rome in 1875. He died there in 1904 and is buried with his brother Alexander in the Protestant Cemetery.

Pavel Svedomsky painted in various genres, most notably in historic. The painting Medusa (1882) was bought by Pavel Tretyakov to be displayed in Tretyakov Gallery.

Working in the St Volodymyr's Cathedral in Kiev, Svedosmky painted the northern and southern naves of the cathedral, creating six scenes from the life of Jesus: The Resurrection of Lazarus, The Entry of Christ into Jerusalem, The Last Supper, The Agony in the Garden, The Trial of Pilate, The Crucifixion and The Ascension. During his later years Svedomsky turned to Russian subjects, painting The Poor Bride, The Fool in Christ, The Fire of Moscow, 1812 (1879) and The Execution of Yermak.

The works of Svedomsky are scattered across various central and regional museums. The Tretyakov Gallery houses five of his paintings, while the Perm State Art Gallery holds a sketch for the church painting Procession of the Cross, as well as Two Roman Women With Tambourine and Flute.
