= Adrian Prakhov =

Russian art critic, archaeologist and art historian

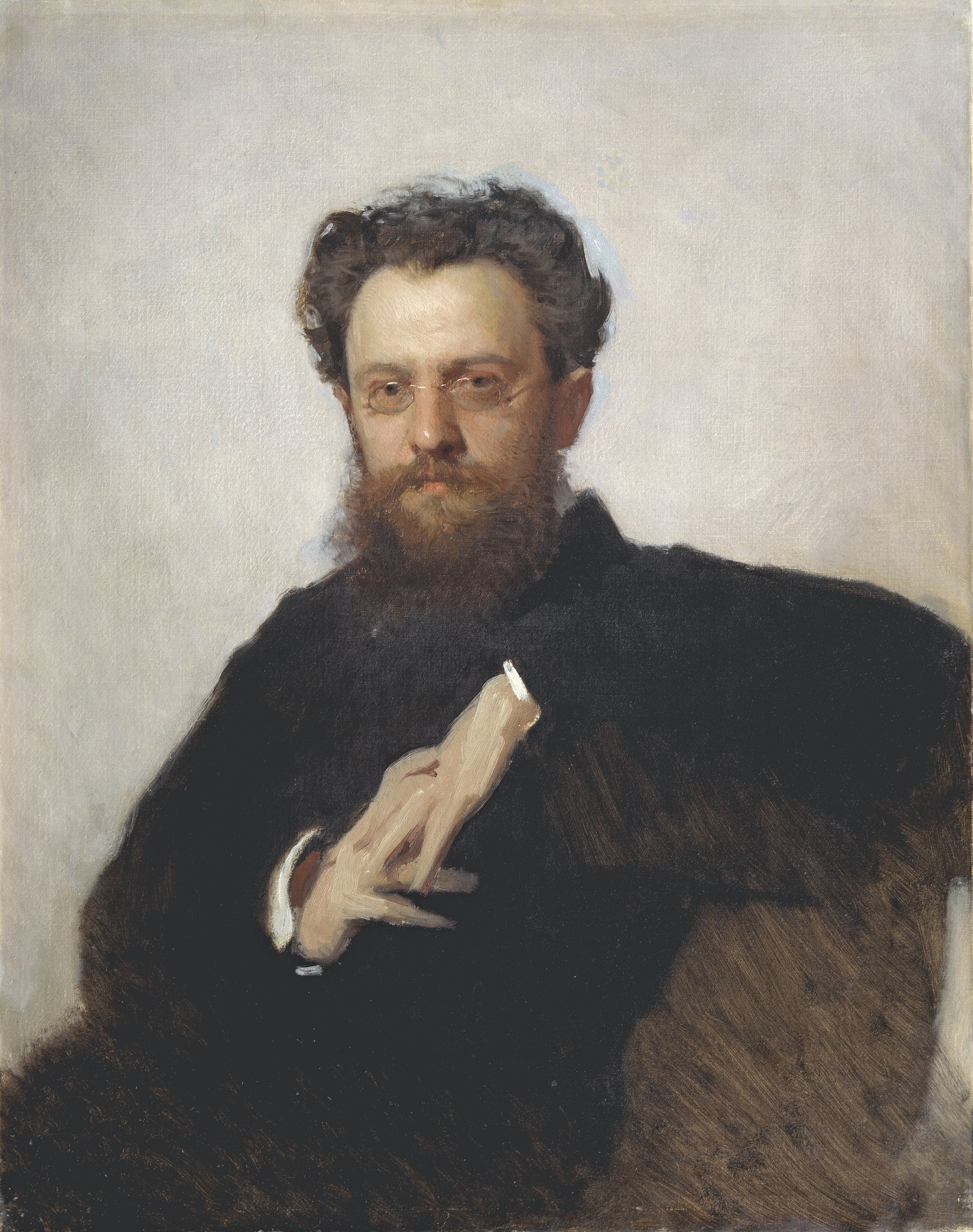
Portrait by Ivan Kramskoi (1879)

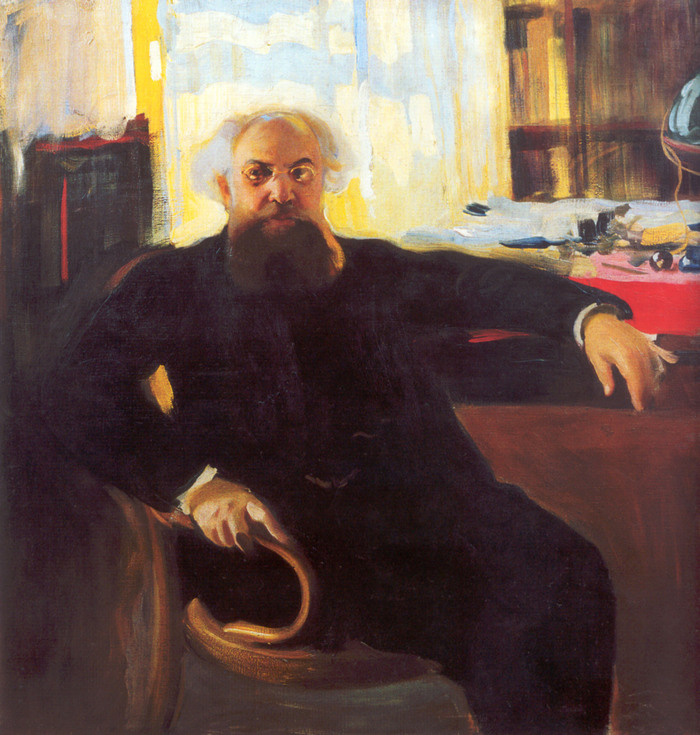
Portrait by Aleksandr Murashko (1904)

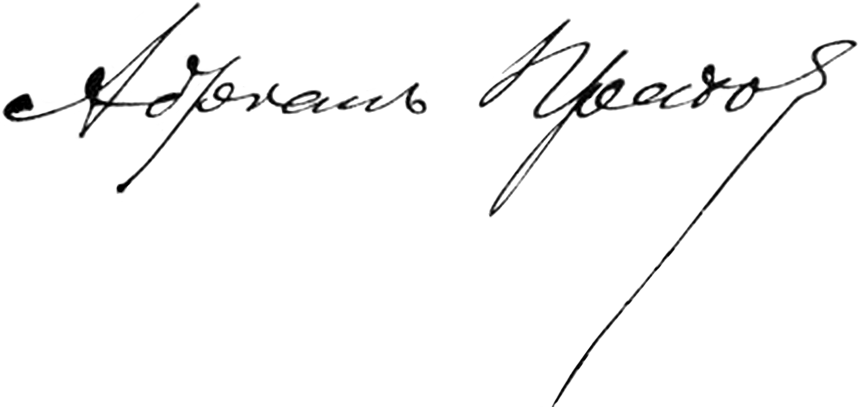
Signature, 1884

Adrian Victorovich Prakhov (Russian: Адриан Викторович Прахов; 16 March 1846, Mstislavl, Russian Empire – 14 May 1916, Yalta, Russian Empire) was a Russian art critic, archaeologist and art historian.

== Biography ==
In 1863, he entered Saint Petersburg University, where he studied history and philology. After graduating in 1867, he was sent abroad for further studies, in preparation for employment with the department of art history.

In Munich, he attended the lectures of several scientists, including Heinrich Brunn, and studied the examples of Ancient Greek art in the collection of the Glyptothek. This was followed by similar studies in Paris, London, Berlin, Vienna and Italy, where he became a member of the German Archaeological Institute of Rome. Upon returning in 1873, he was awarded a master's degree for his thesis, "On the restoration of the eastern group of pediments at the temple to Aegina in Athens". Shortly after, he was chosen to be a lecturer.

From 1875 to 1878, he edited an illustrated magazine called Пчела (The Bee) and, from the same year to 1887, he taught the history and theory of fine art at the Imperial Academy of Arts. He received his doctoral degree in 1879 for his dissertation, "The Architecture of Ancient Egypt". After that, he turned to Old Russian art of the early Christian period, researching and sketching the mosaics and murals at Saint Sophia's Cathedral and St. Cyril's Monastery in Kiev. From 1881 to 1882, he traveled throughout Greece, Turkey, and the Middle East. In 1886, he studied the Assumption Cathedral and several other structures in Vladimir-Volynsky.

The following year, he copied the unique frescoes at St. Michael's Monastery. The originals were lost in 1934, when the Soviet government demolished the monastery. That same year (1887), Prakhov moved from the University of Saint Petersburg to the University of Kiev, where he taught until 1897.

While there, he was in charge of managing interior decoration for St. Vladimir's Cathedral, including marble and bronze works, frescoes and furniture. He made two trips to Greece to study Byzantine decorative styles and oversaw a large group of well-known Russian and Ukrainian painters, including Victor Vasnetsov and Mikhail Nesterov. In 1897, he returned to his former chair in Saint Petersburg and remained there until his death. After 1901, he and Alexandre Benois edited "Russian Art Treasures" (Художественные сокровища России), the monthly journal of the Imperial Society for the Encouragement of the Arts.

His wife, Emilia Lestel, was a concert pianist who had studied with Franz Liszt and also posed as a model for the painter, Mikhail Vrubel. His son, Nikolai, was a painter and art historian. His daughter, Elena, was an amateur artist, and worked as a model for Mikhail Nesterov, to whom she was briefly engaged.

== Writings available online ==
- Критические наблюдения над формами изящных искусств. Зодчество древнего Египта. (Critical observation of forms of Fine Arts. Architecture of Ancient Egypt) 1880.
- Киевское искусство X, XI и XII вв. Каталог выставки копий с памятников искусства в Киеве X, XI и XII вв. (Kyiv Art X, XI and XII centuries. Catalog of the exhibition of copies of works of art in Kyiv, X, XI and XII centuries) 1883.
- Открытие фресок Киево-Кирилловской церкви XII века, исполненное в 1881 и 1882 г.г. (The discovery of murals in St. Cyril's Church of Kyiv-the XII century, executed in 1881 and 1882) 1883.
- Альбом Исторической выставки предметов искусства, устроенной в 1904 году в С.-Петербурге. (Historical Album of art exhibitions, set up in 1904 in St. Petersburg) 1907.
