= Woodlawn Historic District =

Woodlawn Historic District may refer to:

in the United States

(by state)

- Woodlawn Historic District (Birmingham, Alabama), listed on the National Register of Historic Places (NRHP) in Alabama
- Woodlawn Highlands Historic District, Birmingham, AL, listed on the NRHP in Alabama
- Woodlawn Commercial Historic District, Birmingham, AL, listed on the NRHP in Alabama
- Woodlawn Historic District (Athens, Georgia), listed on the NRHP in Georgia
- Woodlawn Historic District (Lincolnton, Georgia), listed on the NRHP in Georgia
- Woodlawn Historic District (Iowa City, Iowa), listed on the NRHP in Iowa
- Woodlawn Historic District (Natchez, Mississippi), listed on the NRHP in Mississippi
- Woodlawn Avenue Row, Buffalo, NY, listed on the NRHP in New York
- Woodlawn (Alexandria, Virginia), listed on the NRHP in Virginia
- Woodlawn Historic and Archeological District, Port Conway, VA, listed on the NRHP in Virginia

== See also ==
- Woodlawn (disambiguation)
- Woodlawn Cemetery (disambiguation)
- Woodlawn Farm (disambiguation)
