= Woodlawn =

Woodlawn may refer to:

- Woodlawn (film), a 2015 film
- St John's College, Woodlawn, a school in New South Wales, Australia

== Populated places ==
=== Australia ===
- Woodlawn, New South Wales, a locality in the Northern Rivers
- Woodlawn, Queensland, a neighbourhood in Moola, Western Downs region

=== Canada ===
- Woodlawn, Nova Scotia, a neighbourhood of Dartmouth
- Woodlawn, Ontario, a neighbourhood of Ottawa

=== Ireland ===
- Woodlawn, County Galway
- Woodlawn, County Dublin, Housing estate in Northside, Dublin

=== United States ===
- Woodlawn (Birmingham), a neighborhood in Birmingham, Alabama
- Woodlawn, Chicago, Illinois, a South Side neighborhood
- Woodlawn, Jefferson County, Illinois
- Woodlawn, Kansas
- Woodlawn, Kentucky
- Woodlawn, Baltimore County, Maryland
- Woodlawn, Prince George's County, Maryland
- Woodlawn, Michigan
- Woodlawn, Mississippi
- Woodlawn, Missouri, an unincorporated community
- Woodlawn, Bronx, a neighborhood in New York City
- Woodlawn, Erie County, New York, a hamlet
- Woodlawn, Schenectady, New York
- Woodlawn, North Carolina
- Woodlawn, Ohio
- Woodlawn, Portland, Oregon
- Woodlawn, Pennsylvania, town which merged to form Aliquippa
- Woodlawn, Tennessee
- Woodlawn, Texas, in Harrison County
- Woodlawn, Virginia (disambiguation), multiple places
- Woodlawn, Wisconsin

==== Buildings and plantations ====
- Woodlawn (Smyrna, Delaware), listed on the NRHP
- Woodlawn (Leon County), Florida, a historic plantation
- Woodlawn (Columbia, Maryland), listed on the NRHP
- Woodlawn (Ellicott City, Maryland), a historic house
- Woodlawn (St. Marys, Maryland), listed on the NRHP
- Woodlawn (Garrison, New York), listed on the NRHP
- Woodland Plantation (Carlisle, South Carolina)
- Woodlawn (Nashville, Tennessee), listed on the NRHP
- Woodlawn (Austin, Texas), a historic estate
- Woodlawn (Alexandria, Virginia) Alexandria, Virginia, a historic estate operated by the National Trust for Historic Preservation
- Woodlawn (Miller's Tavern, Virginia), listed on the NRHP
- Woodlawn (Oilville, Virginia), listed on the NRHP
- Woodlawn (Vernon Hill, Virginia), listed on the NRHP
- Woodlawn (Kearneysville, West Virginia), listed on the NRHP

== See also ==
- Wood Lawn (disambiguation)
- Woodlawn Cemetery (disambiguation)
- Woodlawn Farm (disambiguation)
- Woodlawn Historic District (disambiguation)
- Woodlawn Station (disambiguation)
- Margaret Fetterolf, formerly known as "Woodlawn Jane Doe"; a murder victim found in Woodlawn, Maryland
- Woodland (disambiguation)
