= Wood Lawn =

Wood Lawn may refer to:

- Wood Lawn (Mount Mourne, North Carolina), listed on the NRHP in Iredell County
- Wood Lawn (New Brunswick, New Jersey), listed on the NRHP in Middlesex County

== See also ==
- Woodlawn (disambiguation)
- Woodlawn Cemetery (disambiguation)
