= Woodlawn Park =

Woodlawn Park may refer to a place in the United States:

- Woodlawn Park, Kentucky
- Woodlawn Park, Oklahoma
- Woodlawn Park, the mansion of Judge Henry Hilton in Saratoga Springs, New York

== See also ==
- Woodlawn (disambiguation)
