= USS Duncan (DD-485) =

Gleaves-class destroyer

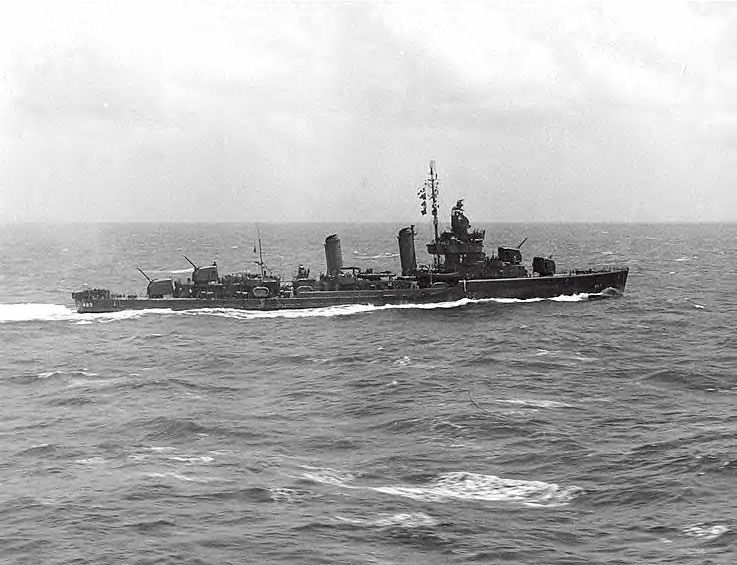
- USS Duncan underway in the south Pacific on 7 October 1942, five days before she was sunk in the Battle of Cape Esperance.

History

United States
- Name: Duncan
- Builder: Federal Shipbuilding and Drydock Company
- Laid down: 31 July 1941
- Launched: 20 February 1942
- Commissioned: 16 April 1942
- Fate: Sank during the Battle of Cape Esperance on 12 October 1942, north of Savo Island

General characteristics
- Class & type: Gleaves-class destroyer
- Displacement: 1,630 tons
- Length: 348 ft 3 in (106.15 m)
- Beam: 36 ft 1 in (11.00 m)
- Draft: 11 ft 10 in (3.61 m)
- Propulsion: 50,000 shp (37,000 kW); 4 boilers; 2 propellers
- Speed: 37.4 knots (69 km/h)
- Range: 6,500 nmi (12,000 km; 7,500 mi) at 12 kn (22 km/h; 14 mph)
- Complement: 16 officers, 260 enlisted
- Armament: 4 × 5 in (127 mm)/38 cal dual-purpose guns, 6 × 0.50 in (12.7 mm) machine guns, 6 × Oerlikon 20 mm cannons, 10 × 21 in (533 mm) torpedo tubes, 2 × depth charge tracks

USS Duncan (DD-485), a Gleaves-class destroyer, was the second ship of the United States Navy to be named after Silas Duncan, who was severely wounded by enemy fire which caused the loss of his right arm during the Battle of Lake Champlain on 11 September 1814.

== Construction and commissioning ==
Duncan was launched on 20 February 1942 by Federal Shipbuilding and Dry Dock Co., Kearny, New Jersey; sponsored by Mrs. D. C. Thayer. The ship was commissioned on 16 April 1942, Lieutenant Commander Edmund B. Taylor in command.

== Service history ==
Duncan sailed from New York on 20 June 1942 for the South Pacific, arrived at Espiritu Santo on 14 September to join TFs 17 and 18, and with them departed the same day to cover transports carrying the 7th Marine Regiment to reinforce Guadalcanal. Duncan was in the screen of the aircraft carrier Wasp next day when the task force was attacked by two Japanese submarines. Wasp was torpedoed, and so severely damaged that she had to be sunk by United States ships. Duncan picked up survivors from the carrier, transferring 701 officers and men to other ships, and 18 wounded and two bodies to the base hospital at Espiritu Santo upon her arrival 16 September.

Duncan continued to operate from Espiritu Santo to the Solomons, screening transports and ships of the covering forces. On 11 October 1942, she was in the screen of Task Force 64 (TF 64) which was assigned to protect a vital transport convoy carrying reinforcements to Guadalcanal. Contact was made with a large enemy surface force just as the American ships were executing a course change as part of their battle plan. Duncan, having a clear radar contact and seeing her flagship apparently steady upon a course which would close the target, believed the destroyers were closing to attack, and found herself charging alone toward the enemy force.

In the resulting Battle of Cape Esperance, Duncan hit a cruiser with several salvos, then shifted fire to a destroyer, at the same time maneuvering radically to avoid enemy fire and that from her own forces, who were now joining in the attack. She got off two torpedoes toward her first target, Furutaka, and kept firing until hits she had received put her out of action. The commanding officer, Lieutenant Commander Edmund B. Taylor who was awarded the Navy Cross for his actions in this battle ordered the bridge, isolated by fire, abandoned, and the wounded lowered into life rafts. The men on board attempted to beach the ship on Savo Island, but then, believing she might yet be saved, continued to fight the fires until power failed, when they abandoned ship. Destroyer McCalla rescued 195 men from the shark-infested waters and made an attempt to salvage Duncan, but she sank on 12 October 1942, about 6 nautical miles (11 km; 6.9 mi) north of Savo Island.

== Awards ==
Duncan received one battle star for World War II service.
