= Edmund B. Taylor =

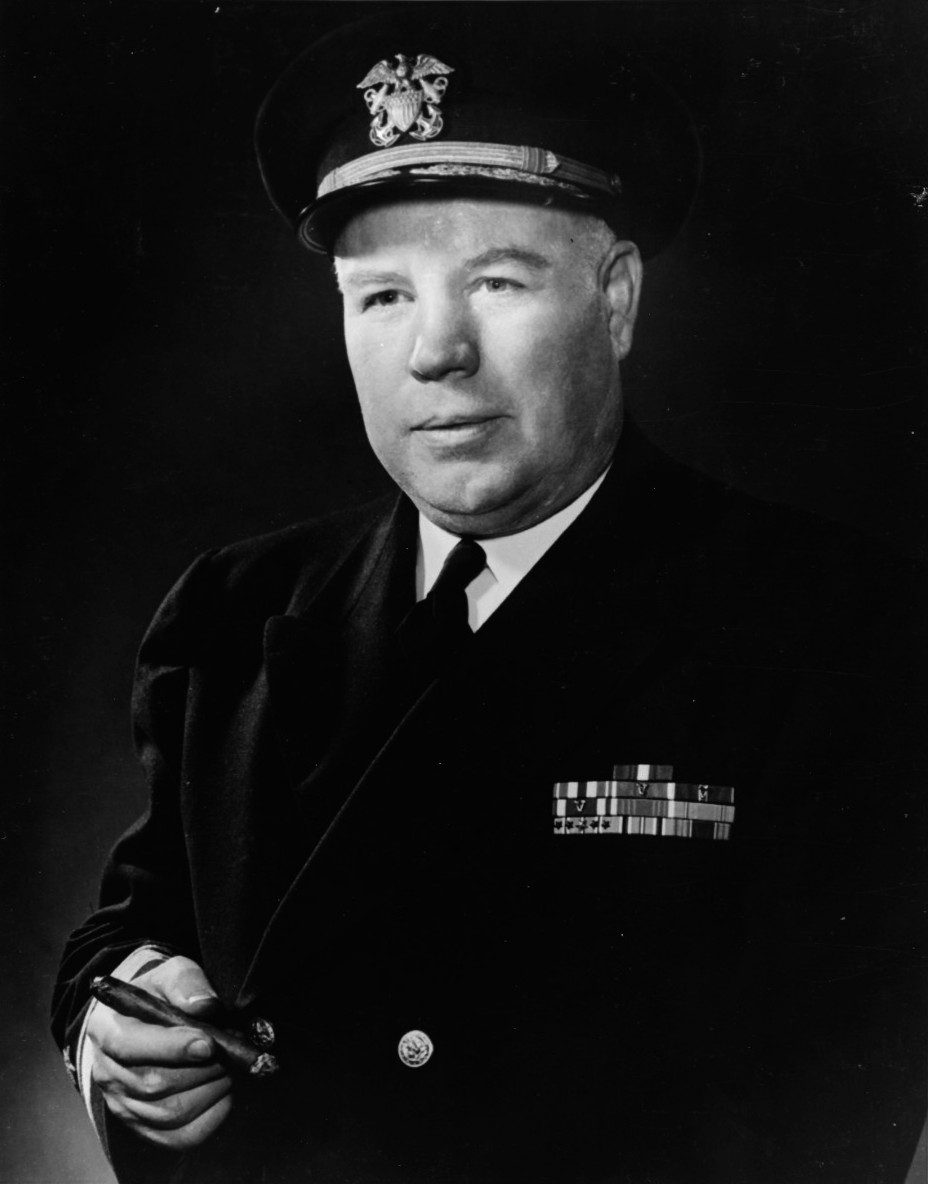
- Born: 4 April 1904; Chicago Illinois, U.S.
- Died: 30 April 1973 (aged 69); Virginia Beach, Virginia, U.S.
- Burial place: Woodlawn Memorial Gardens, Norfolk, Virginia
- Military career
- Allegiance: United States
- Branch: United States Navy
- Service years: 1925–1966
- Rank: Vice Admiral
- Commands: USS Duncan; USS Bennett; USS Salem
- Conflicts: World War II: Battle of Cape Esperance; Battle of Empress Augusta Bay; Battle of the Philippine Sea
- Awards: Navy Cross; Distinguished Service Medal; Silver Star Medal; Legion of Merit; Bronze Star Medal; Purple Heart

Vice Admiral Edmund Battelle Taylor (4 April 1904 – 30 April 1973) was an admiral in the United States Navy. During World War II he saw service in the fighting in the Pacific, including the Battle of Cape Esperance, in which his ship, the USS Duncan was sunk, the Battle of Empress Augusta Bay and the Battle of the Philippine Sea. In the last months of the war he was the naval aide to the Secretary of the Navy, James Forrestal. After the war he commanded the Guantanamo Bay Naval Base and was commander of the Antisubmarine Defense Force, Atlantic Fleet, during the Cuban Missile Crisis.

== Early life and career ==
Taylor was born in Chicago, Illinois, on 4 April 1904, the son of Edmund Blanton Taylor and Rebecca Attwood (Battelle) Taylor. He had three brothers, two of whom joined the Navy; the other joined the United States Air Force, and a sister. When Taylor was a boy, the family moved to Lima, Ohio, where he attended Central High School. On 1921, he was appointed to the United States Naval Academy in Annapolis, Maryland, where he became an accomplished athlete. He was a member of the varsity football team, serving as its captain in 1924, and the varsity lacrosse team, in which he was All-American in 1924–25. He was also a member of the basketball and boxing teams.

Taylor graduated on 4 June 1925, and was commissioned as an ensign. He joined the crew of the battleship USS New York, but returned to Annapolis in August 1926 as an assistant coach of the football team. On 1 September 1926, he married a local girl, Elizabeth Fay Valiant. They had two children, a daughter and a son. In 1929, he returned to sea duty on the battleship USS Wyoming, where he was promoted to lieutenant (junior grade) on 4 June 1928. He joined the crew of the destroyer USS Hatfield in April 1929, and then the destroyer USS Leary in January 1931. In June 1932 he returned to Annapolis as an instructor in gunnery and an assistant coach of football and lacrosse. He was promoted to lieutenant on 1 August 1934. In June 1935, he became executive officer of the destroyer USS Philip and then, in December 1936, of the destroyer USS Perry. From June 1937 to May 1939, he was a flag lieutenant on the staff of the commander of Destroyers, Battle Force.

== World War II ==
Between June 1939 and February 1942, Taylor worked in the Records Section of the Officer Personnel Division in the Bureau of Navigation}, with the rank of lieutenant commander from 1 July 1939. In February 1942, he assumed command of the newly commissioned destroyer USS Duncan, with the rank of commander from 1 August 1942. On 20 June 1942 Duncan set sail from New York, bound for the South Pacific Area. She joined Task Force 18, as part of the destroyer screen around the aircraft carrier USS Wasp. Wasp was torpedoed by a Japanese submarine on 15 September, and so badly damaged that she had to be sunk by United States ships. Duncan collected survivors from the carrier, transferring 701 to other ships, and took 18 wounded and two dead bodies to the base hospital on Espiritu Santo, which she reached on 16 September. Taylor was issued a Letter of Commendation.

On 11 October 1942 Duncan formed part of the screen of Task Force 64, protecting convoy carrying reinforcements to Guadalcanal, when a Japanese surface force was encountered. In the resulting Battle of Cape Esperance, Duncan fired torpedoes at the Japanese cruiser Furutaka but was damaged by shellfire. The bridge was cut off by fire, and Taylor was forced to leave it by jumping over the side. Attempts to put out the fires and save the ship failed, and she sank on 12 October. He was awarded the Navy Cross. His citation read:

For extraordinary heroism during action against enemy Japanese naval forces off Savo Island on 11 October 1942. Although his ship had sustained heavy damage under hostile bombardment, Lieutenant Commander Taylor, by skillful maneuvering, successfully launched torpedoes which contributed to the destruction of a Japanese cruiser. Maintaining the guns of the Duncan in effective fire throughout the battle, he, when the vessel was finally put out of action, persistently employed to the fullest extent all possible measures to extinguish raging fires and control severe damage.

Taylor received a new command, of the destroyer USS Bennett, which was commissioned on 9 February 1943, with the rank of captain from 20 May 1943. Bennett sailed to the South Pacific, where she supported the landings at Cape Torokina in November 1944 and on Green Islands in February 1944, and bombarded the Japanese base at Kavieng on New Ireland on 18 February 1944 and at Rabaul on New Britain 29 February. He was awarded the Bronze Star. His citation read:

For meritorious service in action against the enemy...operating in the Bismarck Archipelago area on the night of 24–25 February 1944. Commander Taylor led his ships deep into enemy held waters in a harassing night raid and bombardment of Japanese installations in the vicinity of Rabaul. Despite known enemy shore batteries and possible mine fields, he directed the attack at close range, which resulted in severe damage to supply areas and ammunition dumps. Due to his excellent seamanship and skillful execution of the attack, no damage was inflicted on any of his ships.

Taylor commanded Destroyer Division 90 from August 1943 to May 1944, participating in the Empress Augusta Bay, and Destroyer Squadron 45 from May 1944 to November 1944. He was awarded the Silver Star for the Battle of the Philippine Sea. In December 1944, he became the naval aide to the Secretary of the Navy, James Forrestal.

== Post-war ==
After the war, Taylor returned to Annapolis again as its head of the Department of Physical Training and director of athletics in My 1946. In July 1948, he became assistant chief of staff for operations on the staff of the Commander in Chief, Pacific. From January 1950 to January 1951 he commanded the heavy cruiser USS Salem. After service in the Bureau of Naval Personnel at the Navy Department from February to December 1951, he became assistant to the Under Secretary of the Navy. Promoted to Rear Admiral on 1 September 1952, he commanded Destroyer Flotilla 2 in the Atlantic, and then, from February 1954 until September 1955, the Guantanamo Bay Naval Base. He was Chief of Information at the Navy Department from September 1955 to December 1957 and then Commander Destroyer Force, US Atlantic Fleet from January 1958 to December 1959. He was promoted to vice admiral on 30 December 1959, and commanded Antisubmarine Defense Force, Atlantic Fleet from January 1960 until November 1963, which included during the Cuban Missile Crisis. His final posting before retirement on 1 May 1966 was as commandant of the Fifth Naval District in Norfolk, Virginia.

== Death ==
Taylor died in a Virginia Beach, Virginia, hospital on 30 April 1973 as a result of a heart attack. A memorial service was held at the Chapel-in-the-Woods at the Naval Air Station, Norfolk, and he was buried in the Woodlawn Memorial Gardens. His son, Navy Captain Edmund B. Taylor Jr., was killed in a helicopter accident in Vietnam on 8 May 1972.

== Awards and decorations ==

1st Row	Navy Cross		
2nd Row	Navy Distinguished Service Medal	Silver Star Medal	Legion of Merit with Gold Star and combat V
3rd Row	Bronze Star Medal with combat V	Purple Heart	Navy and Marine Corps Commendation Medal
4th Row	American Defense Service Medal	American Campaign Medal	Asiatic–Pacific Campaign Medal with six service stars
5th Row	World War II Victory Medal	National Defense Service Medal	Philippine Liberation Medal

== Dates of rank ==
Ensign	Lieutenant (junior grade)	Lieutenant	Lieutenant Commander	Commander	Captain	Rear Admiral	Vice Admiral
O-1	O-2	O-3	O-4	O-5	O-6	O-8	O-9
4 June 1925	4 June 1928	1 August 1934	1 July 1939	1 August 1942	20 May 1943	1 September 1952	30 December 1959
