= USS Bennett =

Fletcher-class destroyer

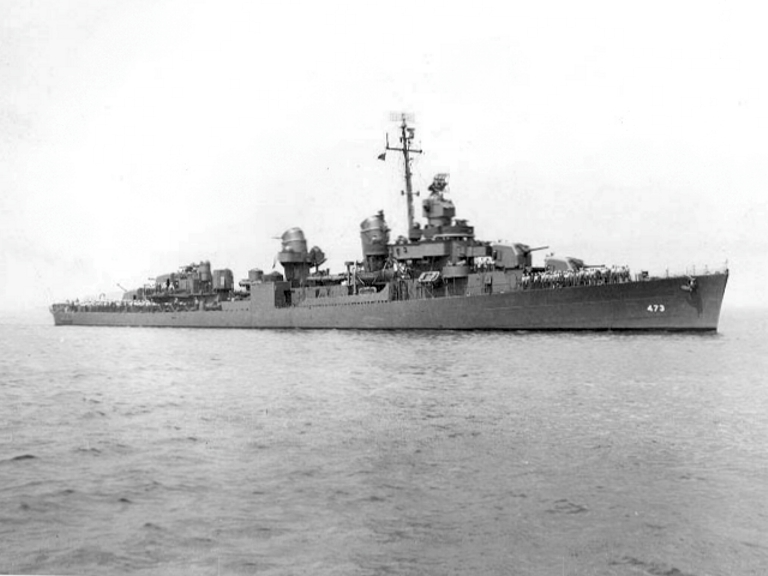
- USS Bennett DD-473 off Naval Yard Boston 1943

History

United States
- Namesake: Floyd Bennett
- Builder: Boston Navy Yard
- Laid down: 10 December 1941
- Launched: 16 April 1942
- Commissioned: 9 February 1943
- Decommissioned: 18 April 1946
- Stricken: 1 August 1973
- Fate: Transferred to Brazil, 15 December 1959

History

Brazil
- Name: Paraíba
- Acquired: 15 December 1959
- Stricken: 1978
- Fate: Scrapped in 1978

General characteristics
- Class & type: Fletcher-class destroyer
- Displacement: 2,050 tons
- Length: 376 ft 6 in (114.7 m)
- Beam: 39 ft 8 in (12.1 m)
- Draft: 17 ft 9 in (5.4 m)
- Propulsion: 60,000 shp (45 MW); 2 propellers
- Speed: 35 knots (65 km/h; 40 mph)
- Range: 6500 nmi. (12,000 km) at 15 kt
- Complement: 336
- Armament: 5 × single Mk 12 5 in (127 mm)/38 guns; 5 × twin 40 mm (1.6 in) Bofors AA guns; 7 × single 20 mm (0.8 in) Oerlikon AA guns; 2 × quintuple 21 in (533 mm) torpedo tubes; 6 × single depth charge throwers; 2 × depth charge racks

USS Bennett (DD-473), a Fletcher-class destroyer, was a ship of the U.S. Navy that was named for the naval aviator Floyd Bennett (1890–1928), who flew towards the North Pole with Richard E. Byrd in 1926, but it is disputed whether they made it there.

The Bennett (DD-473) was launched on 16 April 1942 at the Boston Navy Yard, sponsored by Mrs. Floyd Bennett, the widow of Aviation Machinist Bennett. She was commissioned on 9 February 1943 with Commander Edmund B. Taylor in command.

== History ==
The Bennett arrived at Pearl Harbor on 31 May, and she then spent the next two months patrolling in the Hawaiian Islands. After escorting a convoy to Efate in the New Hebrides, she acted as a plane guard and patrolled out of Efate (27 August through 28 October). Moving to the Solomon Islands 4 November, she patrolled and escorted convoys until 5 April 1944. Included in her service in the Solomon Islands was support of the Cape Torokina, Bougainville landings (on 1 November 1943 on the western side of the island) and Green Island (on 15 February 1944) landings, and bombardments of the Japanese base at Kavieng on New Ireland, (on 18 February 1944) and Rabaul, New Britain (29 February).

The Bennett next steamed north to take part in the invasions of Saipan (14 June through 1 July) and of Guam (2nd through 16 August). Returning to the Central Pacific later in the month she supported the invasion of the Palaus (Peleliu) (6 through 25 September), and then she returned to San Francisco for upkeep work, arriving on 25 October 1944.

The Bennett returned to Pearl Harbor on 24 December, and she remained in Hawaiian waters for the next month. Then she steamed west to take part in the invasion of Iwo Jima (19 February through 5 March 1945), where she was slightly damaged by a dud bomb (1 March). On 1 April she was a unit of the forces taking part in the invasion of Okinawa. At 08:50, on 7 April, she was hit by an Imperial Japanese Navy kamikaze plane, damaging the forward engine room, and knocking out all of her electrical power. Seven sailors ultimately died from their injuries, and fourteen survived serious injuries.

The Bennett was able to make it to the small naval base at Kerama Retto under her own power, and on the following day she departed for Saipan under tow of the fleet tugboat USS Yuma (ATF-94). After emergency repairs, she steamed to Puget Sound Navy Yard where she underwent further repairs (May though August 1945). In August she reported to Adak, in the Aleutian Islands, and then she made one voyage to Petropavlovsk on the Kamchatka Peninsula, with weather personnel (28 August through 26 September). Returning to San Diego, she was placed in commission in reserve on 21 December 1945, and out of commission in reserve on 18 April 1946.

== Brazilian service ==
Stricken 1 August 1973. Bennett was transferred to Brazil 15 December 1959, where she was renamed Paraíba.

The ship was stricken by the Brazilian Navy and scrapped in 1978.

== Honors ==
Bennett received nine battle stars and a Navy Unit Commendation for her service in World War II.
