= Woodlawn City Hall =

City hall in Birmingham, Alabama

- U.S. National Register of Historic Places
- U.S. Historic district – Contributing property
- Alabama Register of Landmarks and Heritage
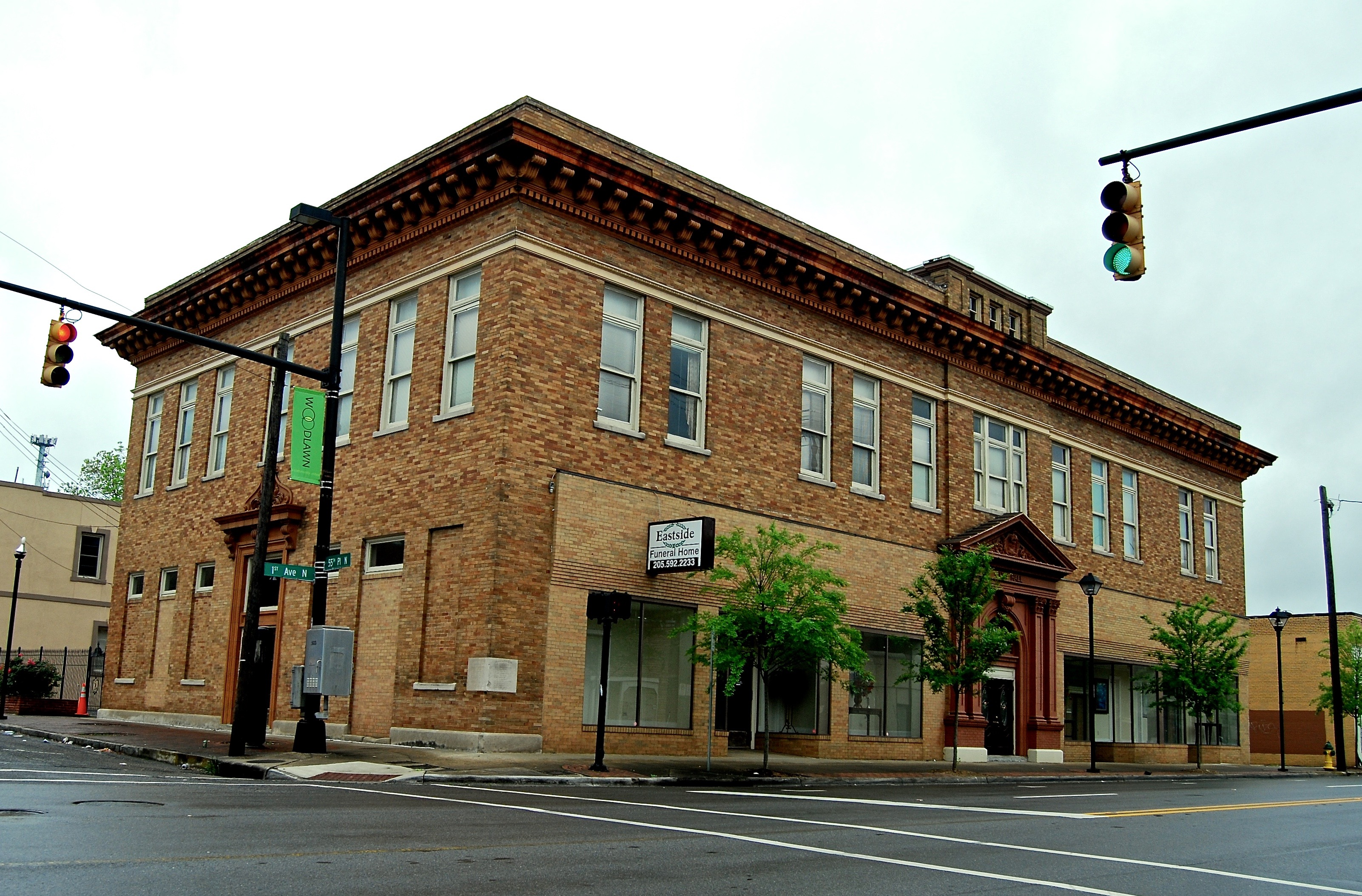

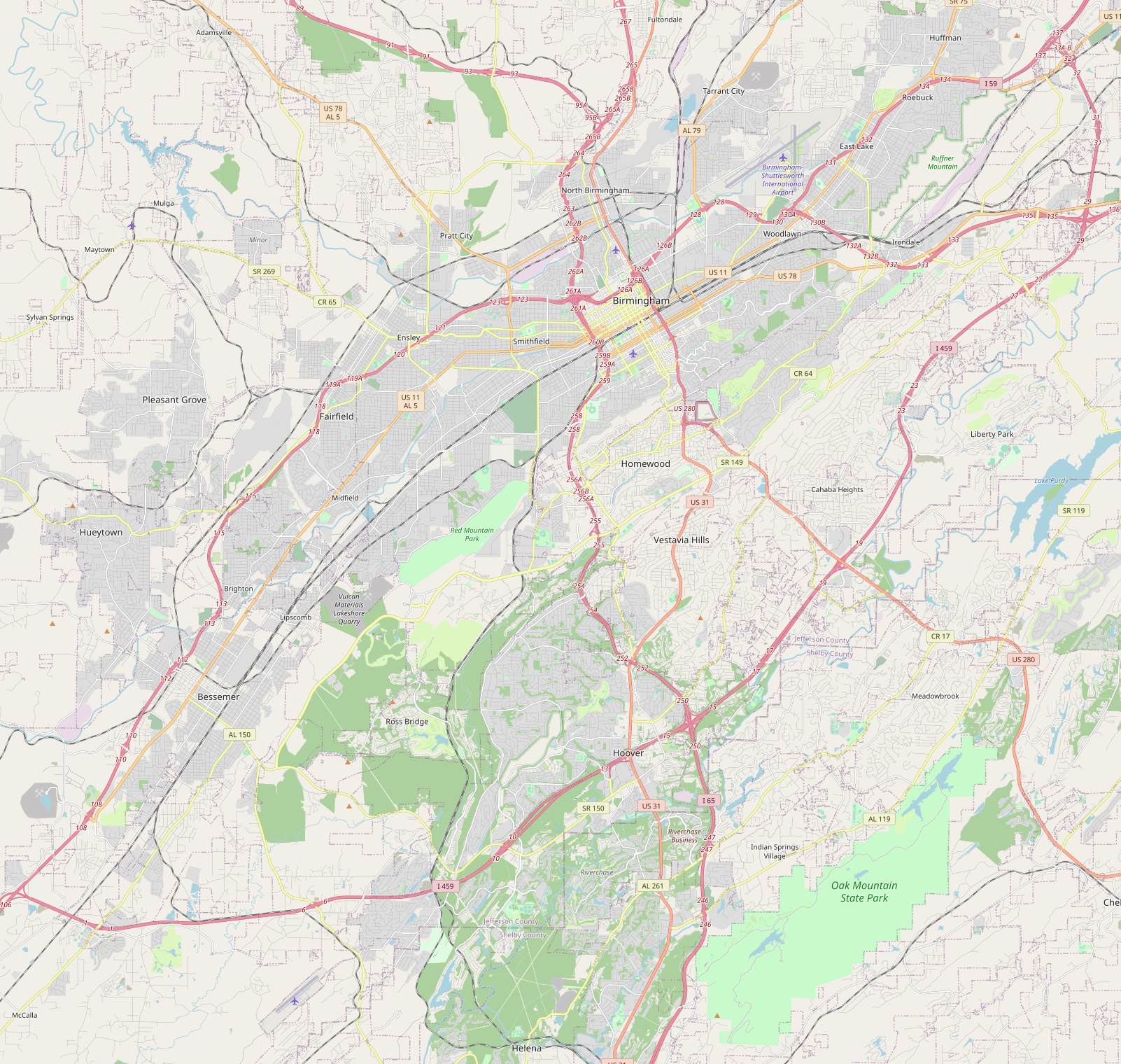
- Location within Birmingham, Alabama Location within Alabama Location within the United States
- Location: 5525 First Ave., N, Birmingham, Alabama
- Coordinates: 33°32′20″N 86°45′11″W
- Area: less than one acre
- Built: 1908
- Architect: R.E. Posey
- Part of: Woodlawn Commercial Historic District (ID90002179)
- NRHP reference No.: 88000990

Significant dates
- Added to NRHP: June 30, 1988
- Designated CP: January 25, 1991
- Designated ARLH: November 23, 1976

The Woodlawn City Hall, at 5525 First Ave., N, in Birmingham, Alabama, was built in 1908. It was listed on the National Register of Historic Places in 1988. It is also one of 12 contributing buildings in the Woodlawn Commercial Historic District, and one of 608 contributing buildings in larger Woodlawn Historic District.

It is a two-story building.

It served as city hall of independent Woodlawn, Alabama for only two years, before the city was incorporated into Birmingham. It included "most of the town's public functions within its walls— city offices, the court and jail, the fire department, an auditorium for meetings and performances, and the first branch of the Greater Birmingham Library, which began with 890 books. Relieved of its city hall status after the annexation, the upstairs became used entirely by the Library (they did not build separate quarters until 1950), while the street level was converted on one side to retail spaces, the longest-term occupant of which was the Morgan Brothers Department Store. The fire station remained until 1928, and subsequently that half of the first floor was converted to commercial use. The City of Birmingham did not sell the Woodlawn City Hall to private interests until 1940."
