= Woodlawn Station =

Woodlawn Station can refer to several stations on rail transit systems:

- Woodlawn station (Charlotte), a light rail station in Charlotte, North Carolina
- Woodlawn station (IRT Jerome Avenue Line), a New York City Subway station in the Bronx, New York
- Woodlawn station (Metro-North), a commuter rail station in the Bronx, New York, near the Woodlawn New York City Subway station
- Woodlawn railway station, a passenger rail station near Woodlawn in County Galway, Ireland
- Aliquippa Station or Woodlawn Station, a defunct station in Aliquippa, Pennsylvania

== See also ==
- Woodlawn (disambiguation)
