= Oilville, Virginia =

Unincorporated community in Virginia, United States

- Unincorporated community
- Location within Virginia Location within the United States
- Coordinates: 37°42′15″N 77°47′07″W
- Country: United States
- State: Virginia
- County: Goochland
- Elevation: 315 ft (96 m)
- Time zone: UTC-5 (Eastern (EST))
  - Summer (DST): UTC-4 (EDT)
- ZIP code: 23129
- Area code: 804
- GNIS feature ID: 1497060

Oilville is an unincorporated community in Goochland County, Virginia, United States. Oilville is located on U.S. Route 250, 22 miles (35 km) west-northwest of Richmond. Oilville has a post office with ZIP code 23129.

The historic Woodlawn Plantation is located here. It was listed on the National Register of Historic Places in 1971.

Oilville got its unusual name because a Sassafras oil factory was located there in the 1900s:

In the Goochland County Historical Society Magazine Vol.26 from 1994, Wendell Watkins reminisces about his childhood in an article titled The Oilville Mill. He recalls that local legend had it that Oilville was an important stage coach stop on Three Chopt Road, known then as Horsepen Mills. He said that when a sassafras oil mill was set up there, it then became known as Oilville. He recalled “as a very small boy, I remember the sassafras logs laying about the woods and the holes where the stumps had been dug out. They used the stumps and roots only for distilling the oil.” For more information see the story Oilville? by "Wick Hunt" in "Oyster Ranching Etc.", online.
