= USS Valley Forge (CV-45) =

Essex-class aircraft carrier of the US Navy

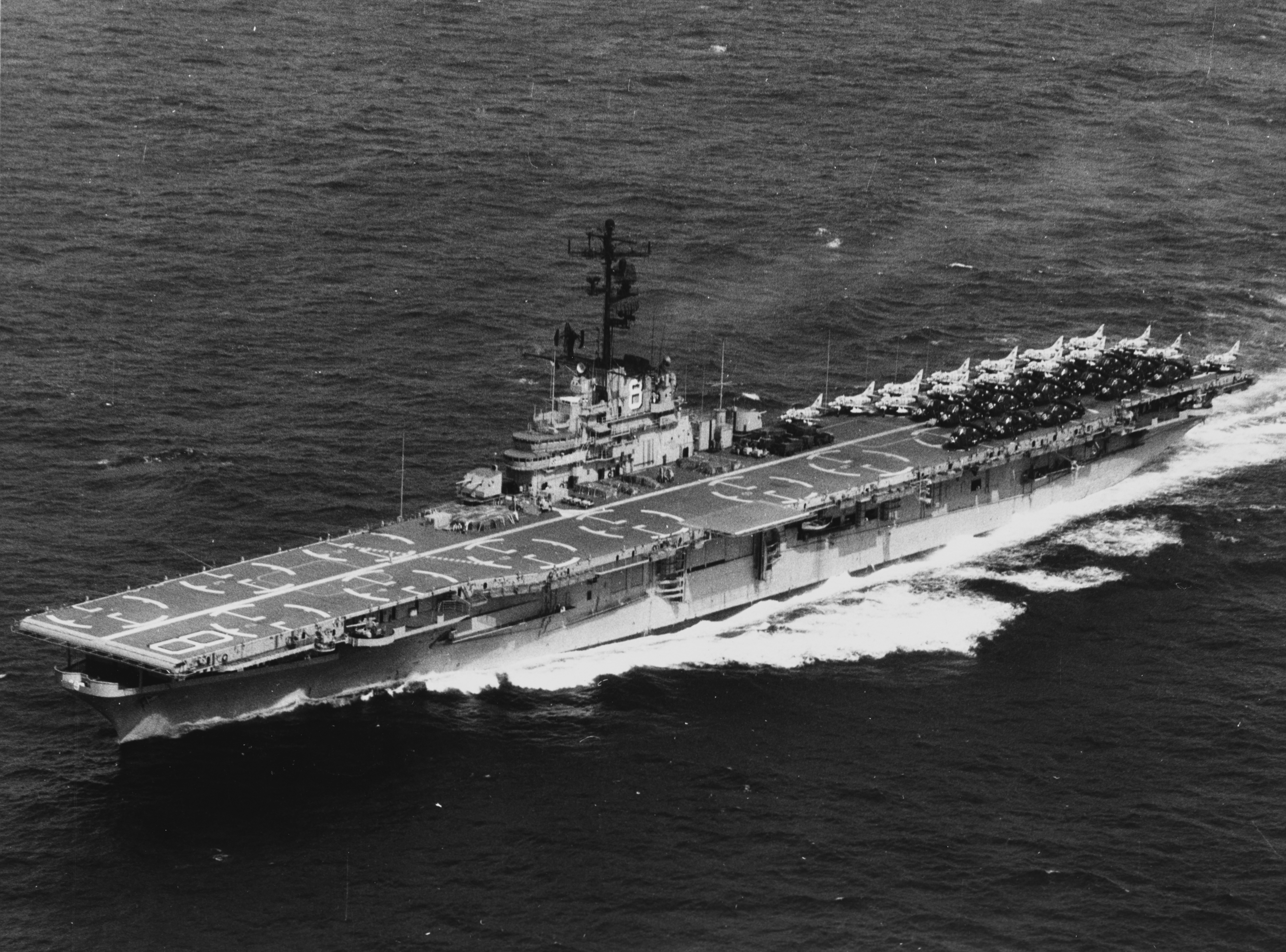
- USS Valley Forge with A-4 Skyhawks in 1965

History

United States
- Name: Valley Forge
- Namesake: Valley Forge
- Ordered: 14 June 1943
- Builder: Philadelphia Naval Shipyard
- Laid down: 14 September 1943
- Launched: 5 November 1945
- Commissioned: 3 November 1946
- Decommissioned: 15 January 1970
- Reclassified: CVA-45, 1 October 1952; CVS-45, 1 January 1954; LPH-8, 1 July 1961
- Stricken: 15 January 1970
- Fate: Scrapped, 29 October 1971
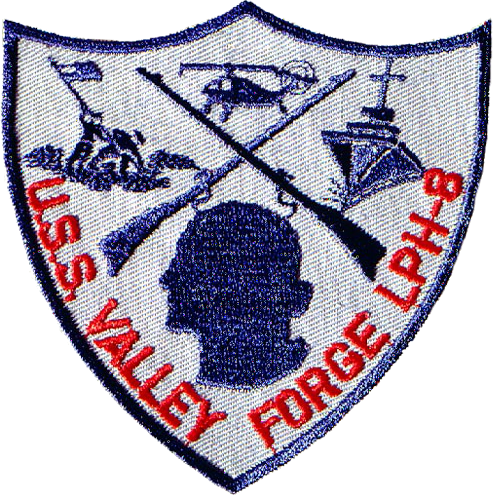
- Badge

General characteristics
- Class & type: Essex-class aircraft carrier
- Displacement: 27,100 long tons (27,500 t) standard
- Length: 888 feet (271 m) overall
- Beam: 93 feet (28 m)
- Draft: 28 feet 7 inches (8.71 m)
- Installed power: 8 × boilers; 150,000 shp (110 MW)
- Propulsion: 4 × geared steam turbines; 4 × shafts
- Speed: 33 knots (61 km/h; 38 mph)
- Complement: 3448 officers and enlisted
- Armament: 12 × 5 inch (127 mm)/38 caliber guns; 32 × Bofors 40 mm guns; 46 × Oerlikon 20 mm cannons
- Armor: Belt: 4 in (102 mm); Hangar deck: 2.5 in (64 mm); Deck: 1.5 in (38 mm); Conning tower: 1.5 inch
- Aircraft carried: 90–100 aircraft

USS Valley Forge (CV/CVA/CVS-45, LPH-8) was one of 24 Essex-class aircraft carriers built during and shortly after World War II for the United States Navy. The ship was the first US Navy ship to bear the name, and was named after Valley Forge, the 1777–1778 winter encampment of General George Washington's Continental Army. Valley Forge was commissioned in November 1946, too late to serve in World War II, but saw extensive service in the Korean War and the Vietnam War. She was reclassified in the early 1950s as an attack carrier (CVA), then to an antisubmarine carrier (CVS), and finally to an amphibious assault ship (LPH), carrying helicopters and Marines. As a CVS she served in the Atlantic and Caribbean. She was the prime recovery vessel for an early uncrewed Mercury space mission. After conversion to an LPH she served extensively in the Vietnam War. Valley Forge was awarded eight battle stars for Korean War service and nine for Vietnam War service, as well as three Navy Unit Commendations.

Although she was extensively modified internally as part of her conversion to an amphibious assault ship, external modifications were minor, so throughout her career Valley Forge retained the classic appearance of a World War II Essex-class ship. She was decommissioned in 1970, and sold for scrap in 1971.

== Construction and Commissioning ==
The citizens of the Philadelphia area in 1945 bought over $76,000,000 worth of E Bonds during the Seventh War Loan Drive to pay for Valley Forge—equal to $1.05 billion in 2024. School children of Philadelphia sold $7,769,351 of these bonds (equivalent to $107 million in 2024).

The ship was one of the "long-hull" Essex-class, laid down on 7 September 1944 at the Philadelphia Naval Shipyard. Like all long-hull Essex-class ships, she was 888 feet (271 m) long overall and 820 feet (250 m) at the waterline. Her beam was 147 feet 6 inches (44.96 m) at the extreme and 93 feet (28 m) at the waterline. Her draft was 28 feet 7 inches (8.71 m) at standard load and 30 feet 10 inches (9.40 m) full load. As designed, her displacement was 27,500 long tons (27,900 t) standard and 33,400 long tons (33,900 t) full load.

For propulsion, the ships in her class had eight Babcock & Wilcox boilers producing steam at 565 psi (3,900 kPa) and 850 °F (454 °C) delivering 150,000 shaft horsepower [shp] (110,000 kW). She used four Westinghouse geared turbines connected to four 14-foot-7-inch (4.45 m) diameter propellers. She was designed for a maximum speed of 33 knots (61 km/h; 38 mph) and a range of 15,440 nautical miles (28,590 km; 17,770 mi) at 15 knots (28 km/h; 17 mph). During sea trials, her engines produced 154,000 shp (115,000 kW) and she attained 32.93 knots (60.99 km/h; 37.90 mph). She carried 6,300 long tons (6,400 t) of fuel oil and 231,650 US gallons (876,900 L) of aviation gasoline.

For armament, she was originally equipped with a battery of twelve 5-inch (130 mm)/38 caliber guns, eight mounts of four 40-mm Bofors guns and 46 20-mm Oerlikon cannon. She was protected by 1.5 inches (38 mm) of armor on the hangar and protective decks while her belt armor was 2.5 to 4 inches (64–102 mm) thick. Protective bulkheads had 4 inches (100 mm) of armor. The conning tower had 1.5 inches (38 mm) of Special Treatment Steel (STS) on the top and there was 1 inch (25 mm) of STS on the sides of the pilot house. The steering gear had a 2.5 inches (64 mm) deck.

Her flight deck was 862 by 108 feet (263 m × 33 m) and her hangar deck was 654 by 79 feet (199 m × 24 m) by 17 feet 6 inches (5.33 m) high. She was equipped with two elevators, each 48 by 44 feet (15 m × 13 m) with a capacity of 28,000 pounds (13,000 kg), two flight deck aircraft catapults, and the Mark IV arresting gear. She was designed to carry 36 fighter aircraft, 36 dive bombers, and 18 torpedo bombers but this changed through her career as her mission and naval aircraft changed. Her design complement was 268 officers and 2363 men. By the end of the war, the Essex-class carriers had a complement of 3385 officers and men.

Being one of the youngest Essex-class carriers, Valley Forge did not receive the SCB-27 or SCB-125 modifications that her older sisters received. She maintained the World War II-style straight flight deck throughout her life. Her armament was changed in 1954 with her conversion to an antisubmarine carrier CVS-45. Her 20 mm Oerlikon cannon were removed and she carried the original twelve 5-inch (130 mm)/38 caliber guns and a total of 72 40 mm Bofors guns.

She was launched on 18 November 1945, sponsored by Mrs. Mildred Vandegrift (née Strode), wife of Alexander A. Vandegrift, the Commandant of the Marine Corps. Valley Forge was commissioned on 3 November 1946, with Captain John W. Harris in command.

As a commissioning gift, the Commonwealth of Pennsylvania presented Valley Forge with the finest State Silver Service ever presented to the Navy. The service was designed and made by Philadelphia silversmiths in 1904 and was originally placed aboard USS Pennsylvania. The elaborate service was decorated in tradition with Neptune, sea horses and dolphins as well as historic scenes and personalities and a State seal.

== Service history ==
=== 1947–1950 ===
Following fitting out, on 16 Jan 1947 the first eleven aircraft landed on Valley Forge. A Vought F4U Corsair piloted by Commander H. H. Hirshey, the Commanding Officer of VF5B was the first to land on the new carrier. The next day, 96 aircraft and personnel from Air Group 5 were taken aboard.

The carrier got underway on 24 January for shakedown training, which took her, via Naval Station Norfolk, to Guantanamo Bay Naval Base, and the Panama Canal Zone. She completed the cruise on 18 March and returned to Philadelphia for post-shakedown overhaul. The ship left Philadelphia on 14 July, headed south, and transited the Panama Canal on 5 August and a message was sent to Commander Air Pacific (ComAirPac) – "USS Valley Forge reporting for duty". She arrived at her new home port, Naval Base San Diego on 14 August and joined the United States Pacific Fleet.

==== Round the World Cruise ====
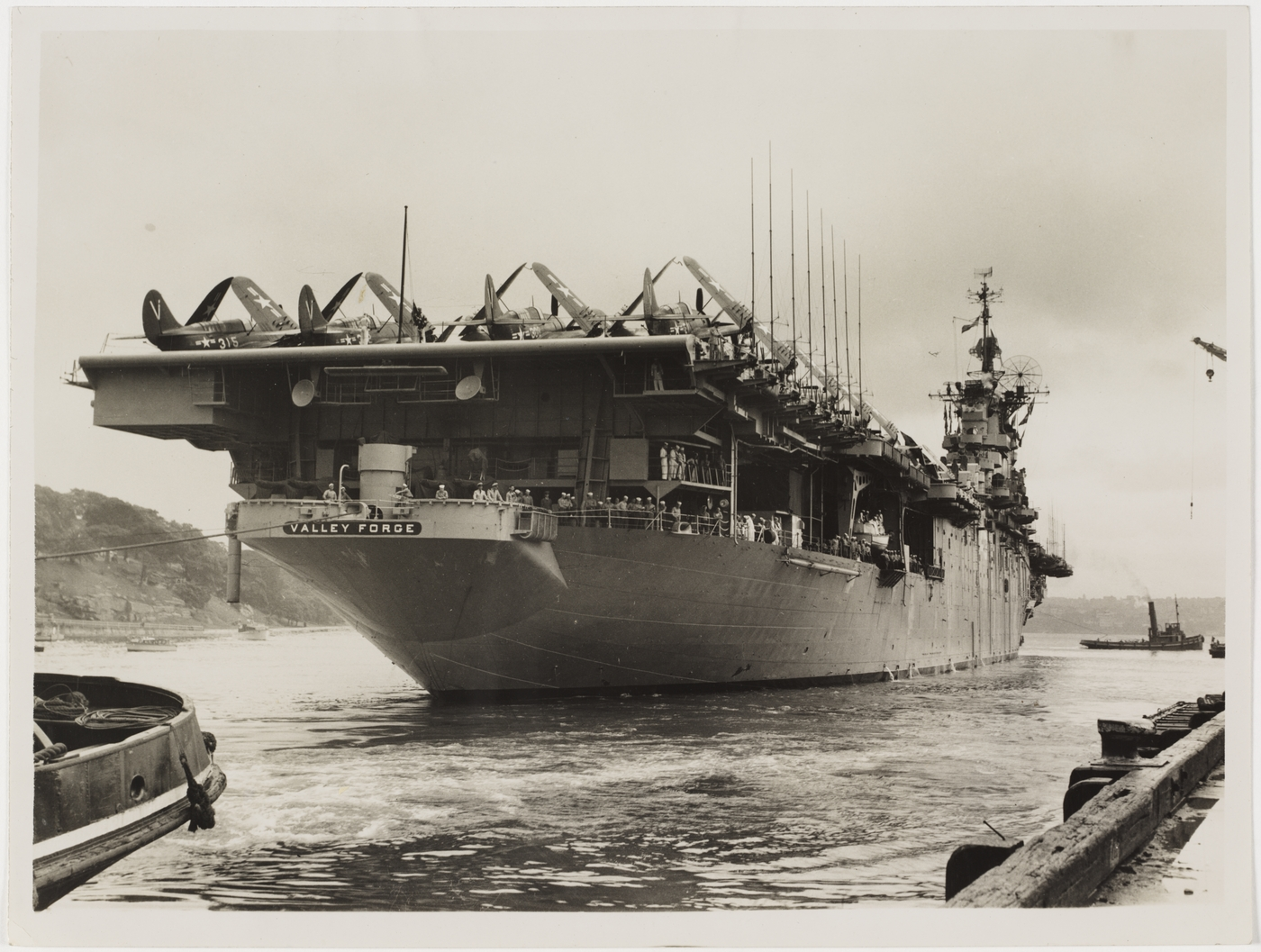
Valley Forge in Sydney Harbour, 1948

Following the embarkation of Air Group 11 and intensive air and gunnery training in coastal waters, the aircraft carrier – flying the flag of Rear Admiral Harold L. Martin, Commander of Task Force 38 (TF 38) – got underway for Hawaii on 9 October. The task force devoted almost three months to training operations out of Naval Station Pearl Harbor before sailing for Australia on 16 January 1948. After a visit to Sydney, the American warships conducted exercises with units of the Royal Australian Navy and then steamed to Hong Kong.

During a voyage from the British crown colony to Tsingtao, China, orders arrived directing the task force to return home via the Atlantic with her escorting destroyers. The ship continued the round-the-world trip with calls at Hong Kong, Singapore, and Trincomalee, Ceylon. On 21 March 1948 at 0800, she was at 18-43'N and 64-33'E – halfway around the world. She visited the Persian Gulf and anchored off the ARAMCO refinery in Ras Tanura, Saudi Arabia as a gesture of goodwill from the American government. On 25 March, the ship's complement "manned the rail" for the Crown Prince of Saudi Arabia and officers attended a banquet given by Crown Prince of Damman. Rounding the Arabian peninsula, she became the largest aircraft carrier and the longest ship at that time to transit the Suez Canal. On 6 April she joined with the Mediterranean Fleet carrier Philippine Sea, cruisers Rochester, Manchester, Dayton, and six destroyers for three days of sea exercises.

After a call at Gibraltar and then entering the Atlantic Ocean, she set a course to Bergen, Norway. On 29 April, she moored in Bergen after a 25-mile (40 km) trip through the treacherous fjords with snow squalls reducing visibility to less than 100 ft at times. The crew paraded through the main part of the city, causing concern, as this was the way the German occupation entered in World War II. On 1 May, a "May Day" parade and celebration was held; unfortunately for the crew, all local pubs were closed. Air Group 11 flew in parade formation over the Capital City of Oslo, spelling the name of King Haakon VII.

The ship was underway 4 May for Portsmouth, England; the historic base of the Royal Navy. After firing a 21-gun salute while passing the imposing HMS Duke of York, the ship was moored near HMS Victory, Admiral Nelson's flagship. The Commander of 6th Fleet authorized 72-hour staggered liberty pass for all hands.

Underway 13 May to New York; on 22 May entered the Lower New York Bay. Chief of Naval Operations Admiral Louis Denfield, who was instrumental in initiating the World cruise, was welcomed aboard for a visit. Underway 27 May for the Panama Canal, she arrived 11 June in San Diego Bay.

In July 1948, new squadrons joined Valley Forge bringing with them the Navy's newly introduced aircraft, the Douglas A-1 Skyraider, and the Navy's first jet fighters, the McDonnell F2H Banshee and the Grumman F9F Panther. These squadrons gave new capabilities to the ship. Intensive air operations and additional training and exercises commenced with the new aircraft.

=== Korean War ===
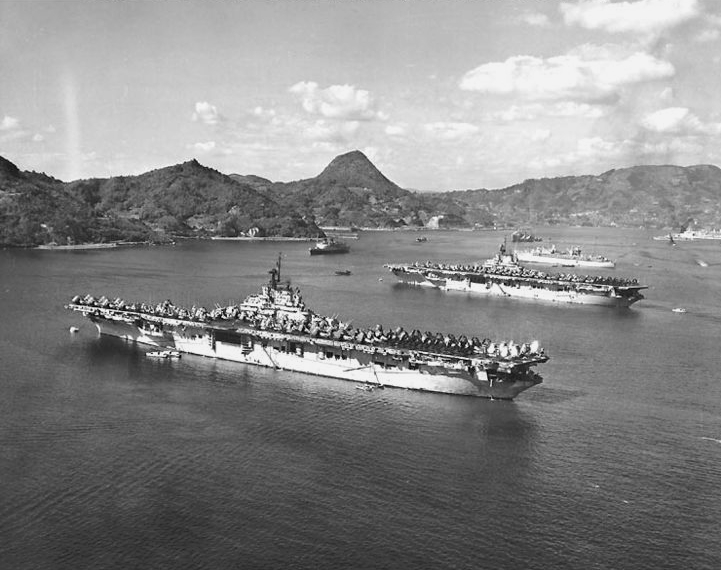
Valley Forge and Leyte at Sasebo 1950

Valley Forge deployed to the Far East, departing the west coast on 1 May 1950. While anchored in Hong Kong harbor on 25 June, the warship received the news that North Korean forces had attacked across the 38th parallel into South Korea. Departing Hong Kong the next day, the carrier steamed south to U.S. Naval Base Subic Bay, where she provisioned, fueled, and set her course for Okinawa. On 28 June, Valley Forge became flagship of the United States Seventh Fleet and formed Task Force 77 with cruiser Rochester and six destroyers. On 30 June, Task Force 77 rendezvoused with ships of the Royal Navy including the cruiser HMS Jamaica, the carrier HMS Triumph, and two British destroyers, under the command of Rear Admiral Andrews, RN.

The first carrier air strike of the Korean War was launched from Valley Forge's flight deck on 3 July 1950. Successive waves of A-1 Skyraiders and F4U Corsairs struck the North Korean airfield at Pyongyang bombing hangars, fuel storages, parked aircraft, and railroad marshaling yards while F9F Panthers, flying top cover, downed two Yak-9s and damaged another. This was the world's first combat strike by jet aircraft.

In spite of attempts by United Nations forces to stop the steady flow of North Korean infantry and armor, the North steadily pushed the South Koreans back into a tenuous defense perimeter around Pusan.

On September 4, 1950, Chance Vought F4U Corsairs of VF-53 took off from the ship to chase down 2 Douglas A-20 Havoc of the Soviet Naval Aviation over the Yellow Sea and shot down one to prevent them from finding a concentration of American ships preparing for the Incheon landing.

On 18 September 1950, the American landing at Inchon outflanked the North Koreans while United Nations forces broke out of the perimeter to the south. After the landing at Inchon, the tide of battle changed and Korean, American, and other allied troops pushed northward and crossed the 38th parallel into North Korea. Valley Forge's Air Group 5 made numerous daily strikes against North Korean targets. Troop concentrations, defensive positions, and supply and communications lines were repeatedly bombed by the A-1 Skyraiders and the F9F Panthers and F4U Corsairs delivered rocket and cannon fire. Over 5,000 combat sorties delivered 2,000 short tons (1,800 t) of bombs and rockets between 3 July and 19 November 1950. During this time, Valley Forge maintained a high operational record as she steamed up and down the coast of Korea, a distance equal to twice around the world.

==== Second Deployment ====
Returning to San Diego for overhaul, Valley Forge arrived on the west coast on 1 December, only to have sailing orders urgently direct her back to Korea. In the interim, between the carrier's leaving station and her planned overhaul, Chinese forces had entered the war, launching a powerful offensive which sent United Nations troops retreating back to the south. Accordingly, Valley Forge hurriedly embarked a new air group, about 100 planes and 10 helicopters; replenished, 1,000 short tons (910 t) of provisions and stores and 850 short tons (770 t) of ammunition were loaded in record time of three days; and sailed on 6 December for the Far East.

Rendezvousing with Task Force 77 three days before Christmas of 1950, Valley Forge recommenced air strikes on the 23rd and continued for three months of concentrated air operations against the advancing Chinese and North Korean forces. The first offensive air operations consisting of close air support missions assisting soldiers and marines on the ground. F4U Corsair and A-1 Skyraider pilots struck at troop concentrations, supply dumps, bridges, gun emplacements and railroad equipment. The United Nation forces were able to move north again on the Korean Peninsula and up to the 38th parallel. During her second deployment, the ship launched some 2,580 sorties in which her planes delivered some 1,500 short tons (1,400 t) of bombs.

On 29 March the Valley Forge turned east and began her voyage back home again to San Diego, after spending almost ten continuous months in Korean waters, arriving at North Island on 7 April. The ship, needing long-awaited yard repairs, sailed to Bremerton, Washington and entered the Puget Sound Naval Shipyard where she underwent a major overhaul.

==== Third Deployment ====
Valley Forge returned to San Diego on 10 Aug 1951, ready for a new assignment with the Pacific Fleet. Air Group 1 embarked and she became the first U.S. carrier to return for a third Korean deployment. On 11 December, Valley Forge launched her first air strikes in railway interdiction – keep supplies from reaching enemy front lines. Rockets, cannon fire, and bombs from the ship's air group, and those of her sister ships also on station, hammered at North Korean railway targets – lines, junctions, marshaling yards, and rolling stock. By June, Valley Forge's Skyraiders, Corsairs, and Panthers had severed rail lines in at least 5,346 places. She returned to her homeport in San Diego on 3 July 1952.

==== Fourth Deployment ====
In October 1952, she was reclassified an attack carrier and redesignated CVA-45. Again, in October 1952 she stood out and headed for the Far East. She now had become the only U.S. carrier to return to the Korea combat zone four times. On 2 January 1953, Captained by Robert E. Dixon, she began the new year with strikes against Chinese supply dumps and troop billeting areas behind the stalemated front lines. While the propeller-driven Skyraiders and Corsairs delivered tons of bombs on their targets, the jet Panthers conducted flak-suppression missions using a combination of cannon fire and rockets to knock out troublesome enemy gun sites. This close teamwork between old and new style planes made possible regular strikes against Korea's eastern coastlines and close-support missions to aid embattled Marine or Army forces on the battle lines. Valley Forge air groups dropped some 3,700 short tons (3,400 t) of bombs on the enemy before the ship left the Korean coast and returned to San Diego on 25 June 1953.

=== 1954–1960 ===
After a west-coast overhaul, Valley Forge was transferred to the Atlantic Fleet and reclassified – this time to an antisubmarine warfare support carrier – and redesignated CVS-45. She was refitted for her new duties at the Norfolk Naval Shipyard and then rejoined the Fleet in January 1954. The carrier soon got underway to conduct exercises to develop and perfect the techniques and capabilities needed to carry out her new duties. Conducting local operations and antisubmarine warfare exercises, Valley Forge operated off the east coast through late 1960, varied by a visit to England and the eastern Atlantic for exercises late in 1954. Her operations during this period also included midshipman and reservists' training cruises and occasional visits to the Caribbean.

Carrying out training operations out of Guantanamo Bay in 1957, Valley Forge accomplished an American naval "first" in October, when she embarked the ship's landing party and twin-engined HR2S-1 Mojave helicopters. Experimenting with the new concept of "vertical envelopment"; first pioneered by the Royal Navy and Royal Marines during the Suez Crisis in 1956; Valley Forge's helicopters air-lifted the landing party to the beachhead and then returned them to the ship in the U.S. Navy's first ship-based air assault exercise. In March she again joined ships of the Amphibious Force for a major amphibious landing exercise, LANTPHIBEX 1-58. She off loaded nearly 1,400 Marines, landing them ashore from troop-carrying helicopters.

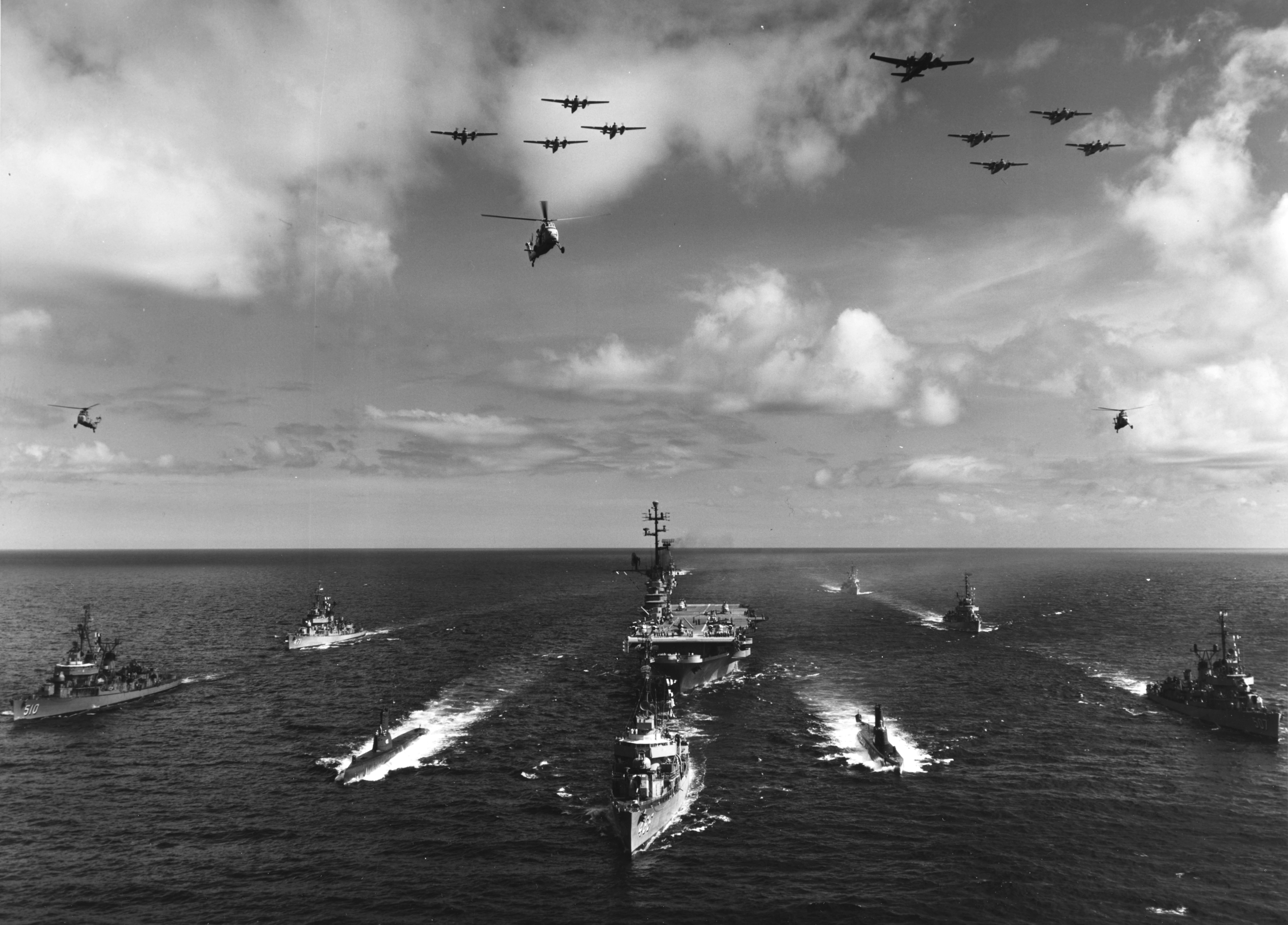
Task Group ALFA, formation portrait of the anti-submarine group's ships and aircraft, taken during 1959 exercises in the Atlantic.

On 1 April 1958, Rear Admiral John S. Thach hoisted his two-star flag to the carrier's main as the ship became flagship of Task Group Alpha (TG Alpha). This group, built around Valley Forge, included eight destroyers, two submarines, and one squadron each of antisubmarine helicopters and airplanes; a detachment of airborne early warning airplanes, modified A-1 Skyraiders called "guppies" because of their bulging ventral Radomes; and a land-based Lockheed P-2 Neptune. A significant development in naval tactics, TG Alpha concentrated solely on developing and perfecting new devices and techniques for countering the potential menace of enemy submarines in an age of nuclear propulsion and deep-diving submersibles.

Observing the New Year (1958–1959) at sea, the carrier was steaming in very heavy weather when she was forced to take evasive action to avoid collision with a merchant ship. Heavy seas severely damaged the forward portion of the flight deck, requiring her to proceed to the New York Naval Shipyard for repairs. To ready her for service as quickly as possible, a corresponding 30-by-90-foot (9.1 m × 27.4 m) section was taken from the flight deck of the inactive carrier USS Franklin (CVS-13), berthed at Bayonne, New Jersey. The damaged section was cut away from Valley Forge's flight deck and the Franklin deck piece installed in its place. A bronze plaque was mounted on the newly replaced deck section to commemorate how the Franklin was damaged in action off Japan in April 1945.

Valley Forge remained engaged in operations with TG Alpha through the early fall of 1959, when she then entered the New York Naval Shipyard for repairs. The ship returned to sea on 21 January 1960, bound for maneuvers in the Caribbean. During her ensuing operations, the carrier served as the launching platform for Operation Skyhook. This widely publicized scientific experiment involved the launching of three of the largest balloons ever fabricated, carrying devices to measure and record primary cosmic ray emissions at an altitude of between 18 and 22 miles (29 and 35 km) above the Earth's surface. Following a deployment in the eastern Mediterranean Valley Forge returned to Norfolk to resume local operations on 30 August, continuing antisubmarine exercises as flagship of TG Alpha through the fall of 1960.

On 19 December, the carrier acted as the primary recovery ship for the Mercury-Redstone 1A uncrewed space capsule, the first flight of the Redstone rocket as part of Project Mercury. Her helicopters retrieved the capsule, launched from Cape Canaveral, after its successful 15-minute flight and splashdown. Two days later off Cape Hatteras, in response to an SOS, Valley Forge sped to the aid of the tanker SS Pine Ridge, which had broken in two during a storm. While the survivors of the stricken ship clung to the after half of the tanker, the carrier's helicopters shuttled back and forth to pick up the men in distress. Soon, all 28 survivors were safe on board Valley Forge.

=== 1961–1964 ===
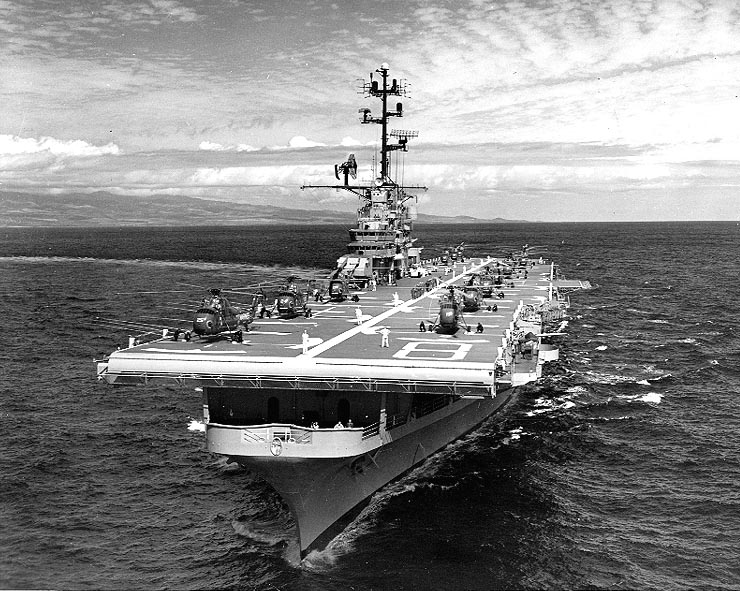
Valley Forge underway in the Pacific Ocean, 1962-63

Entering the Norfolk Naval Shipyard on 6 March 1961 for overhaul and modification to an amphibious assault ship, Valley Forge was reclassified as LPH-8 on 1 July 1961 and, soon thereafter, began refresher training in the Caribbean. She returned to Hampton Roads in September and trained in the Virginia capes area with newly embarked, troop-carrying helicopters. In October, the ship – as a part of the Atlantic Fleet's ready amphibious force – proceeded south to waters off Hispaniola and stood by from 21 to 25 October and from 18 to 29 November to be ready to evacuate any American nationals from the Dominican Republic of needed during the struggle for power in the months following the assassination of Generalissimo Rafael Trujillo.

After returning home late in the year, Valley Forge sailed from Norfolk on 6 January 1962, bound for Long Beach and duty with the Pacific Fleet. At the end of three months of training off the west coast, the amphibious assault ship steamed westward for duty in the Far East with the Seventh Fleet. With the flag of the Commander, Ready Amphibious Task Group, 7th Fleet at her main, Valley Forge closed the coast of Indochina under orders to put ashore her embarked Marines. In Laos, communist Pathet Lao forces had renewed their assault on the Royal Laotian Government and the latter requested President John F. Kennedy to land troops to avert a feared, full-scale communist invasion of the country. The amphibious assault ship airlifted her Marines into the country on 17 May and, when the crisis had abated a few weeks later, carried them out again in July.

For the remainder of 1962, the ship operated in the Far East before returning to the west coast of the United States to spend the first half of 1963 in amphibious exercises off the coast of California and in the Hawaiian Islands. Valley Forge entered the Long Beach Naval Shipyard on 1 July 1963 for a Fleet Rehabilitation and Modernization (FRAM) overhaul, including the installation of improved electronics and facilities for transporting and handling troops and troop helicopters. Putting to sea again on 27 January 1964, the newly modernized assault ship rejoined the fleet and, following local operations and training, departed Long Beach for another WestPac deployment. She stopped at Pearl Harbor and Okinawa, en route to Hong Kong, and then steamed to Taiwan. In June, she joined ships of other SEATO navies in amphibious exercises and then visited the Philippines, where in July she was awarded the Battle Efficiency "E".

=== Vietnam War ===
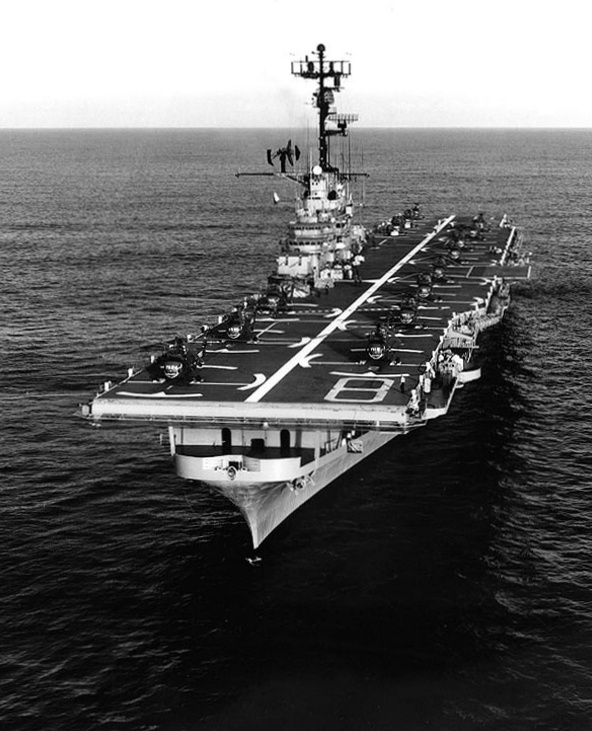
Valley Forge in 1964

On 2 August 1964, North Vietnamese torpedo boats attacked destroyer Maddox in the Gulf of Tonkin incident. Valley Forge then spent 57 days at sea off the Vietnamese coast in readiness to land its Marines if required.

Returning to Long Beach on 5 November, Valley Forge made two round-trip voyages to Okinawa carrying marines and aircraft before commencing a WestPac deployment in the South China Sea in late 1965. With a Marine landing force embarked and flying the flag of Commander, Amphibious Squadron 3, Valley Forge conducted intensive training exercises in the Philippines while preparing for service in Vietnam.

In mid-November, the amphibious assault ship stood by in reserve during Operation Blue Marlin and then airlifted its marines ashore for Operation Dagger Thrust and Operation Harvest Moon before spending the Christmas season in Okinawa. After embarking a fresh Marine battalion and a medium transport helicopter squadron, it sailed for South Vietnam on 3 January 1966. Following pauses at Subic Bay and Chu Lai, Valley Forge arrived off the Vietnamese coast on 27 January and, two days later, launched its landing forces to take part in Operation Double Eagle. Remaining on station off the coast, the ship provided logistic and medical support with inbound helicopters supplying the men ashore and outbound helicopters evacuating casualties for medical treatment back on the ship. Reembarking its landing team on 17 February, Valley Forge proceeded northward, while its Marines rested. The second phase of "Double Eagle" commenced two days later, and the ship's Marines again went ashore via helicopter to attack enemy concentrations. By 26 February, the operation had drawn to a close, and Valley Forge reembarked its Marines and sailed for Subic Bay.

Following a round trip to Đà Nẵng, the carrier steamed back to the west coast for an overhaul and local training along the California coast before again deploying to WestPac. Upon its return to Vietnamese waters, the ship took part in operations off Đà Nẵng before it again returned to the United States at the end of the year 1966.

After undergoing a major overhaul and conducting training off the west coast, Valley Forge returned to the Far East again in November 1967 and took part in Operation Fortress Ridge, launched on 21 December. Air-landing its troops at a point just south of the Vietnamese Demilitarized Zone (DMZ), the ship provided continual supply and medical evacuation (Medevac) services for this "search and destroy" operation aimed at eliminating People's Army of Vietnam (PAVN) units which threatened American and South Vietnamese troops. The completion of this operation on the day before Christmas 1967 did not mark the end of Valley Forge's operations for this year, however, as it was again in action during Operation Badger Tooth, near Quảng Trị in northern South Vietnam.

Upkeep at Đà Nẵng preceded its deployment to its new station off Đồng Hới, where it provided her necessary resupply and MedEvac support for Allied troops operating against PAVN forces. Operation Badger Catch, commencing on 23 January 1968 and extending through 18 February, supported the Cửa Việt Base, at the mouth of the Thạch Hãn River south of the DMZ, before the ship set course for Subic Bay and much-needed maintenance.

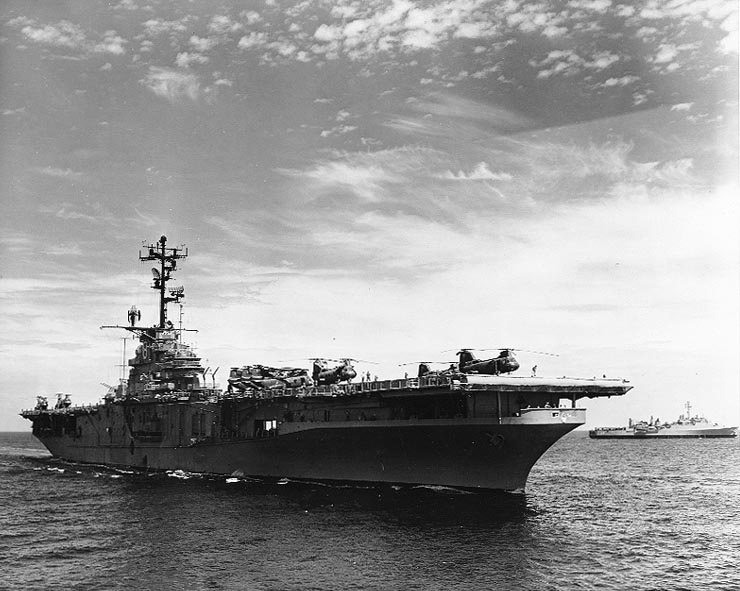
Valley Forge in 1968

Subsequently, returning to Vietnam, Valley Forge operated as "Helo Haven" for Marine helicopter units whose shore bases had come under attack by PAVN ground and artillery fire. During Operation Badger Catch II, from 6 March – 14 April, Marine helicopters landed on board the carrier while their land bases were being cleared of PAVN troops. Following a routine refit at Subic Bay, the ship took part in Operation Badger Catch III from 28 April – 3 June. It then moved to Đà Nẵng and prepared for Operation Swift Saber which took place from 7–14 June. Landing Exercise Hilltop XX occupied the ship early in July. Then Valley Forge transferred its Marines and helicopters to Tripoli and headed home via Hong Kong, Okinawa, and Pearl Harbor. She reached Long Beach on 3 August.

Following five months on the west coast which included local operations and an overhaul, the amphibious assault ship returned to the Far East for the last time departing Long Beach on 30 January 1969.

At San Diego, it embarked a cargo of Marine Sikorsky CH-53 Sea Stallion helicopters for delivery to transport squadrons in Vietnam. The ship stopped at Pearl Harbor and paused near Guam while one of its helicopters carried a stricken crewman ashore for urgent surgery. It loaded special landing-force equipment at Subic Bay and embarked the Commander, Special Landing Forces Bravo and a squadron of Marine Boeing Vertol CH-46 Sea Knight transport helicopters. On 10 March, the carrier began operating in support of Operation Defiant Measure, steaming off Đà Nẵng as its helicopters flew missions "on the beach". This was completed by 18 March, and Valley Forge debarked its helicopters before steaming to Subic Bay for upkeep.

After its return to Đà Nẵng on 3 May, the ship reembarked its helicopters as well as part of a battalion landing team of Marines who had been taking part in fighting ashore. The carrier continued to operate in the Đà Nẵng area during the weeks that followed, its helicopters flying frequent support missions, and its Marines preparing for further combat landings.

During late May and early June, Valley Forge received visits from Secretary of the Navy John Chafee and Vice Admiral William F. Bringle, Commander 7th Fleet. It offloaded its Marines at Đà Nẵng on 10 June and embarked a battalion landing team for transportation to Okinawa, where it arrived on 16 June. The landing team conducted amphibious exercises with Valley Forge for 11 days and boarded the ship for a voyage to Subic Bay where they continued the training process. Valley Forge returned to the Đà Nẵng area on 8 July and resumed flying helicopter support for Marine ground forces in the northern I Corps area. The ship took evasive action to avoid an approaching typhoon and then began preparations for an amphibious operation.

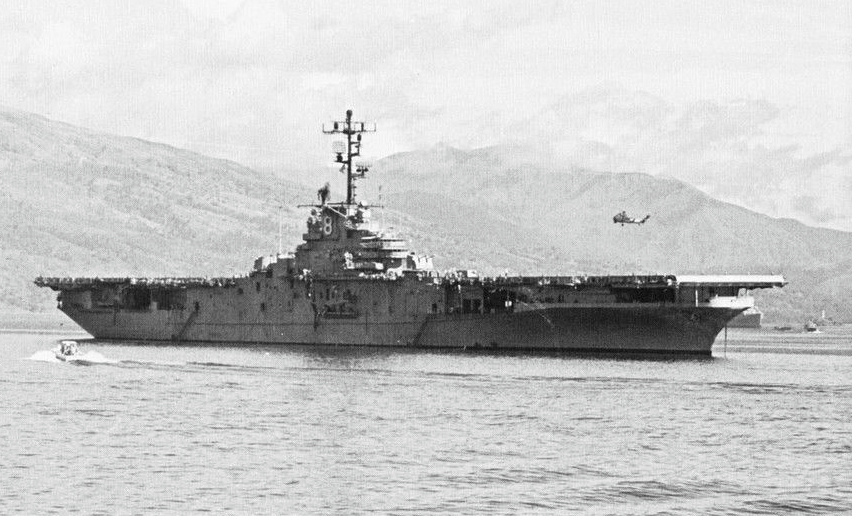
Valley Forge in Subic Bay during February 1969

Operation Brave Armada began on 24 July with a helicopter-borne assault on suspected Việt Cộng and PAVN positions in Quảng Ngãi Province. Valley Forge remained in the Quảng Ngãi–Chu Lai area to support this attack until its completion on 7 August. It then steamed to Đà Nẵng to debark its Marines. General Leonard F. Chapman, Jr., the Commandant of the Marine Corps, visited Valley Forge that same day. The ship sailed for Okinawa on 13 August arriving four days later and debarking its helicopter squadron before getting underway again to evade another typhoon. It proceeded to Hong Kong, and on 22 August, received a message announcing its forthcoming inactivation. It returned to Đà Nẵng on 3 September to load material for shipment to the United States and sailed that evening for U.S. Fleet Activities Yokosuka for three days of upkeep before leaving the Far East.

=== Decommissioning ===
Valley Forge got underway from Yokosuka on 11 September 1969 and anchored at Long Beach on 22 September. After leave and upkeep, she offloaded ammunition and equipment at Naval Weapons Station Seal Beach and Naval Base San Diego. The ship returned to Long Beach on 31 October to prepare for decommissioning. This process continued through the new year; and on 15 January 1970, Valley Forge was placed out of commission. Her name was struck from the Navy List on the same day.

==== Silent Running filming ====
While at Long Beach, from 14 to 28 February 1971, the interior of the aircraft carrier was used as a shooting location for filming the 1972 science fiction film Silent Running. The central location of the film is a 2,000-foot (610 m) long space-bound cargo freighter, carrying six large geodesic domes, under which the last forests of an environmentally-devastated Earth are kept.

The producers of the film were searching for pre-existing locations which could represent the cargo deck, control rooms, and living quarters of a fictional "space freighter." Building sets on Hollywood sound stages would have been prohibitively expensive, so in order to minimize the impact on the film's minimal budget, various large interior locations were investigated, including warehouses, cargo ships, and oil tankers. After contacting the United States Navy with a query about the use of aircraft carriers, the producers were directed to several decommissioned Essex-class carriers awaiting scrapping at the Long Beach Naval Shipyard, including the USS Valley Forge, and fellow carriers Philippine Sea and USS Princeton. The type of location proved to be perfect for the film, the Valley Forge was selected, and a deal was struck with the Navy. In honor of the filming location, the space freighter of the film was christened Valley Forge.

The carrier's hangar deck was featured in the film as a cargo hold, which was repainted and filled with polystyrene modules representing futuristic cargo containers. Her flight command area was heavily modified to represent the control room and living quarters of the fictional space ship crew. Bulkheads were cut out and replaced with wider passageways to allow for camera and actor movement. Set pieces, computer consoles, and various props were moved in to dress the ship as the space freighter. The production crew was allowed to do anything they wanted with the ship, as long as no metal was removed. All power and water had to be imported, as the crew was not allowed to use ship power. Filming was hampered by the tight confines of the carrier, necessitating several innovations in the filming process.

Eight months after filming wrapped, and after the failure of attempts to raise funds for using the ship as a museum, she was sold on 29 October 1971 to the Nicolai Joffre Corporation, of Beverly Hills, California, for scrap.

== Awards ==
Valley Forge was awarded eight battle stars for Korean War service and nine for Vietnam War service, as well as a Navy Unit Commendation.

Navy Unit Commendation
Meritorious Unit Commendation	China Service Medal (extended)	World War II Victory Medal
Navy Occupation Service Medal (with Europe clasp)	National Defense Service Medal (twice)	Korean Service Medal (8 battle stars)
Armed Forces Expeditionary Medal	Vietnam Service Medal (9 battle stars)	Republic of Vietnam Gallantry Cross Unit Citation
Republic of Vietnam Campaign Medal	United Nations Korean Medal	Republic of Korea War Service Medal (retroactive)

== Gallery ==
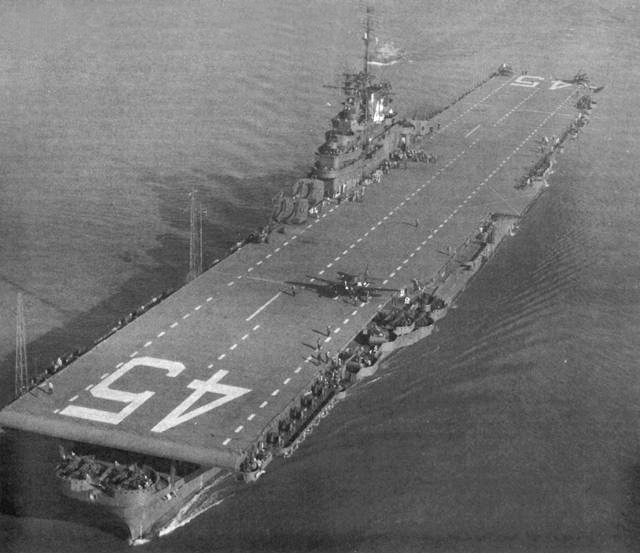
Valley Forge in 1946

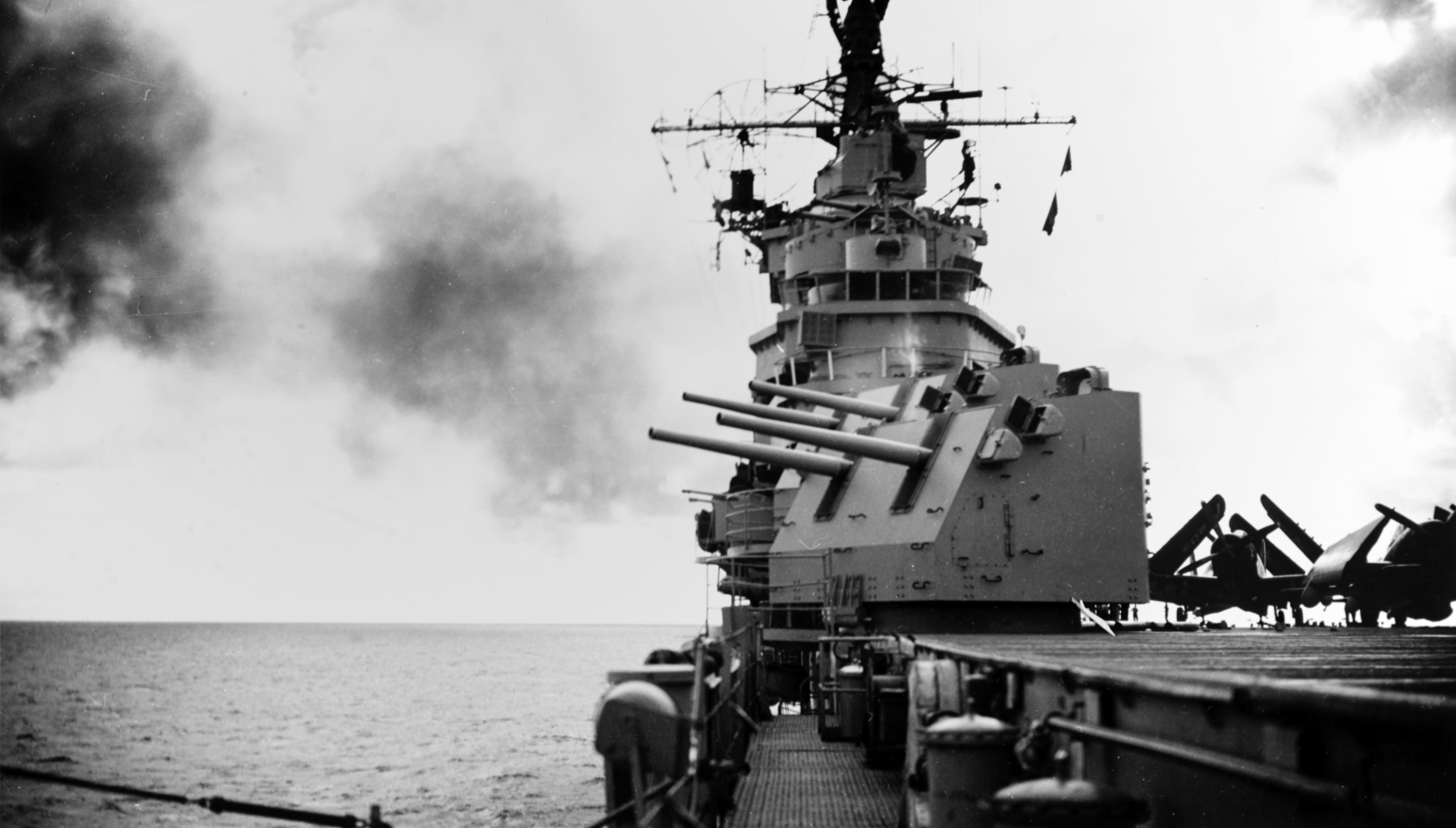
Valley Forge firing her forward 5-inch guns, in November 1949

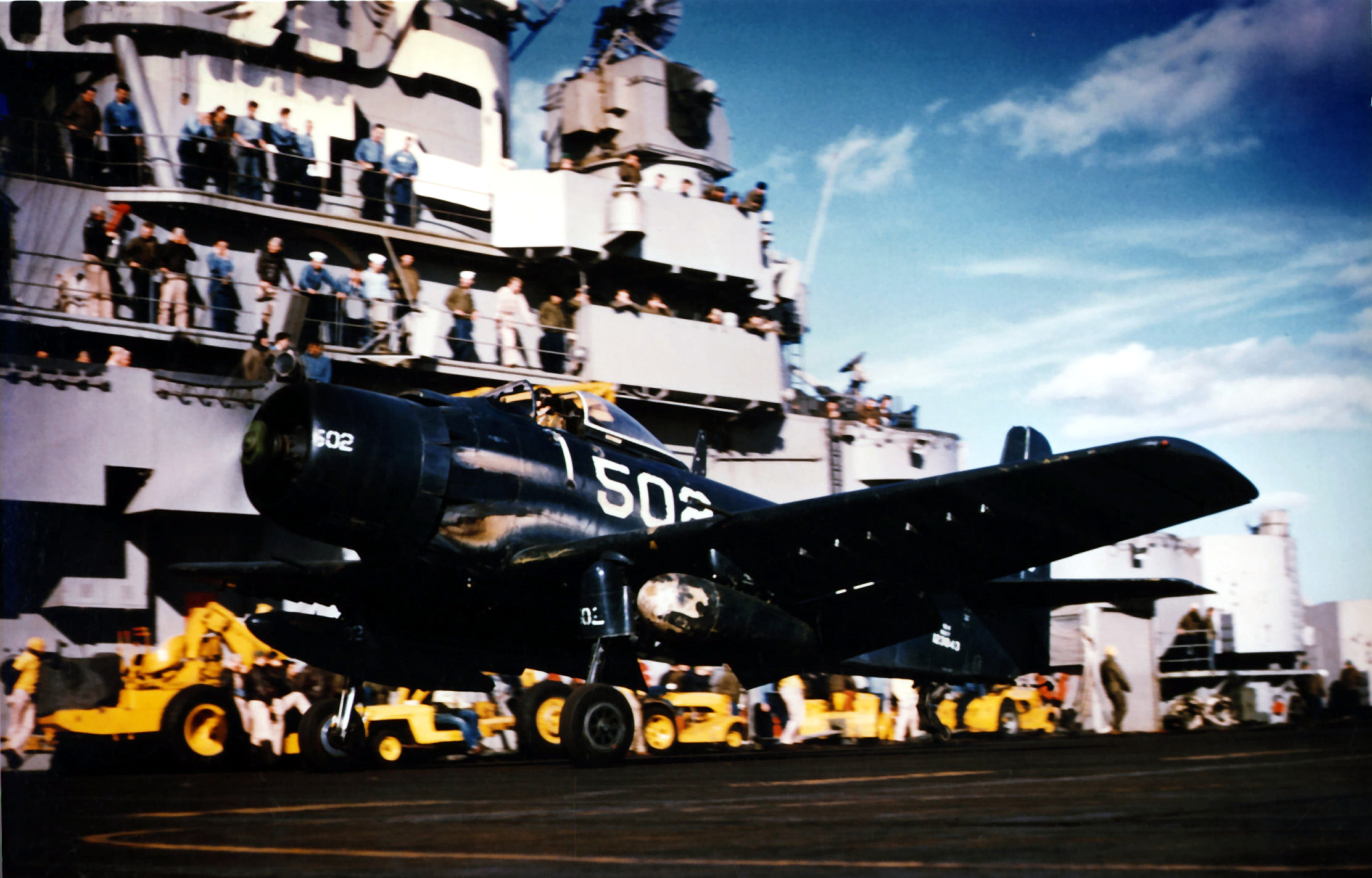
AD-4 Skyraider of VA-55 taking off from Valley Forge in 1950

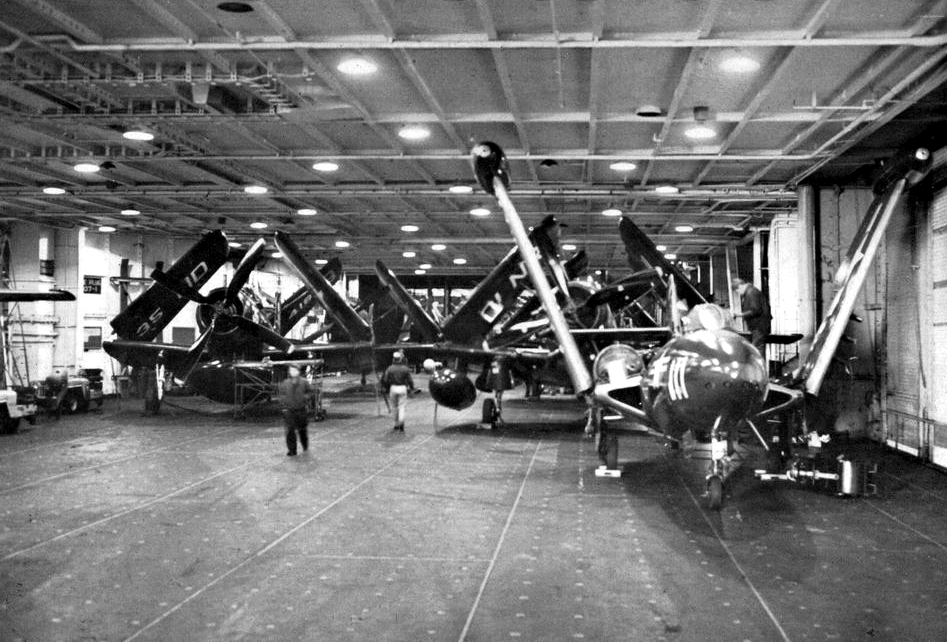
View of the hangar bay of Valley Forge, in 1951–1952

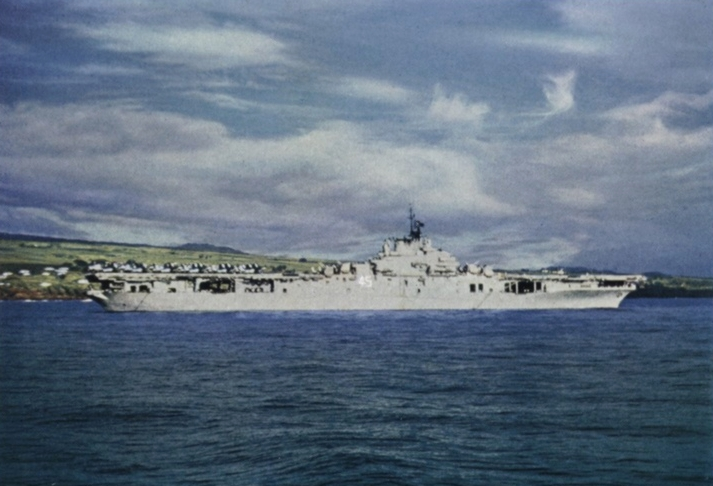
Valley Forge's broadside view c1953

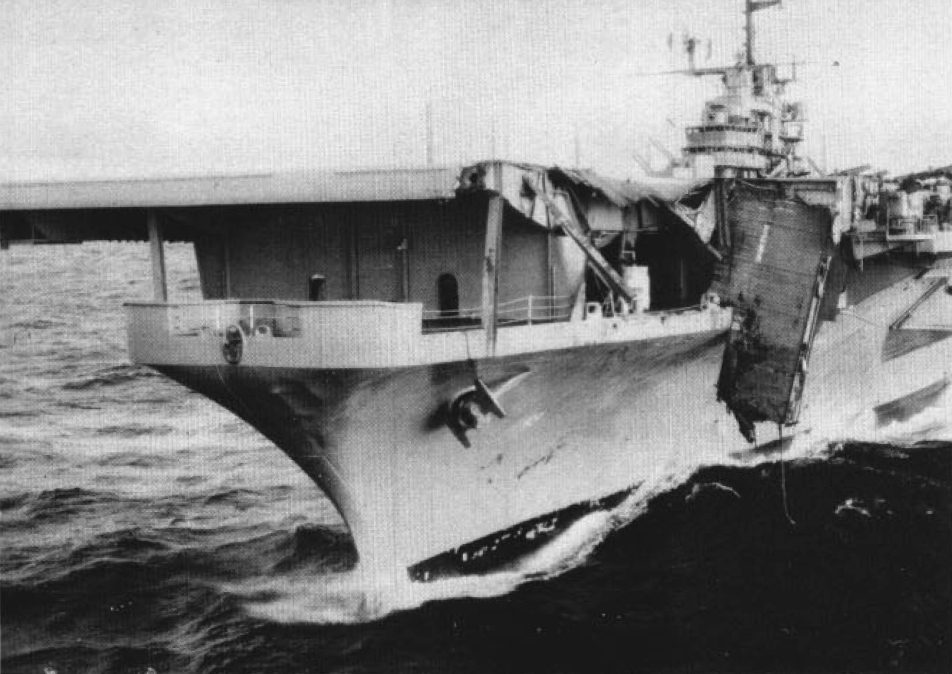
Valley Forge underway with damaged flight deck in January 1959

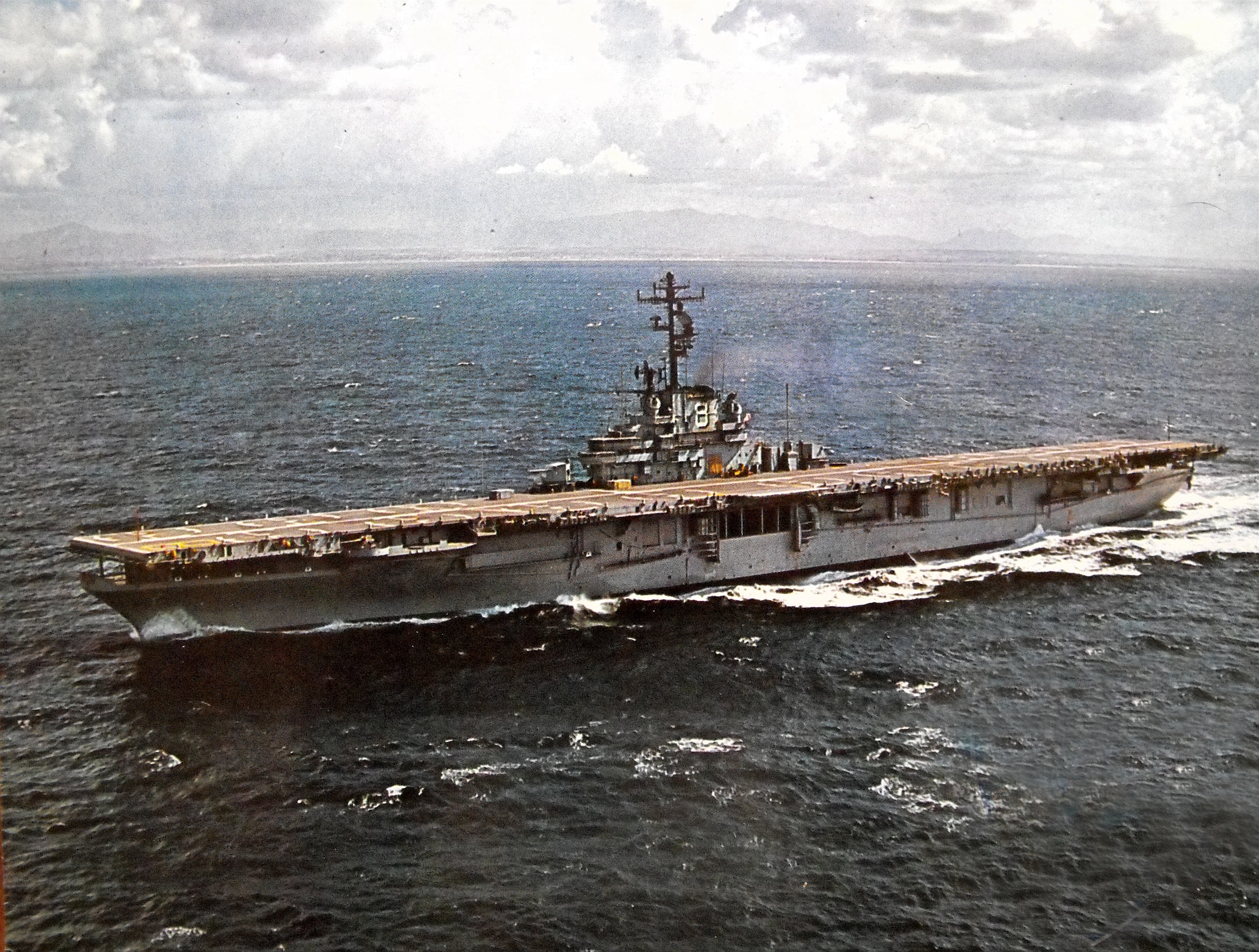
Valley Forge underway in 1964
