= Vernon Hill, Virginia =

Unincorporated community in Virginia, United States

- Unincorporated community
- Location within Virginia Location within the United States
- Coordinates: 36°45′23″N 79°06′10″W
- Country: United States
- State: Virginia
- County: Halifax
- Elevation: 620 ft (190 m)
- Time zone: UTC−5 (Eastern (EST))
  - Summer (DST): UTC−4 (EDT)
- ZIP code: 24597
- Area code: 434
- GNIS feature ID: 1500255

Vernon Hill is an unincorporated community in Halifax County, Virginia, United States. Vernon Hill is located on Virginia State Route 360, 9.7 miles (15.6 km) west of Halifax. Vernon Hill has a post office with ZIP code 24597, which opened on September 8, 1856.

Woodlawn was listed on the National Register of Historic Places in 2005.
