= Robert E. Dixon =

United States admiral (1906–1981)

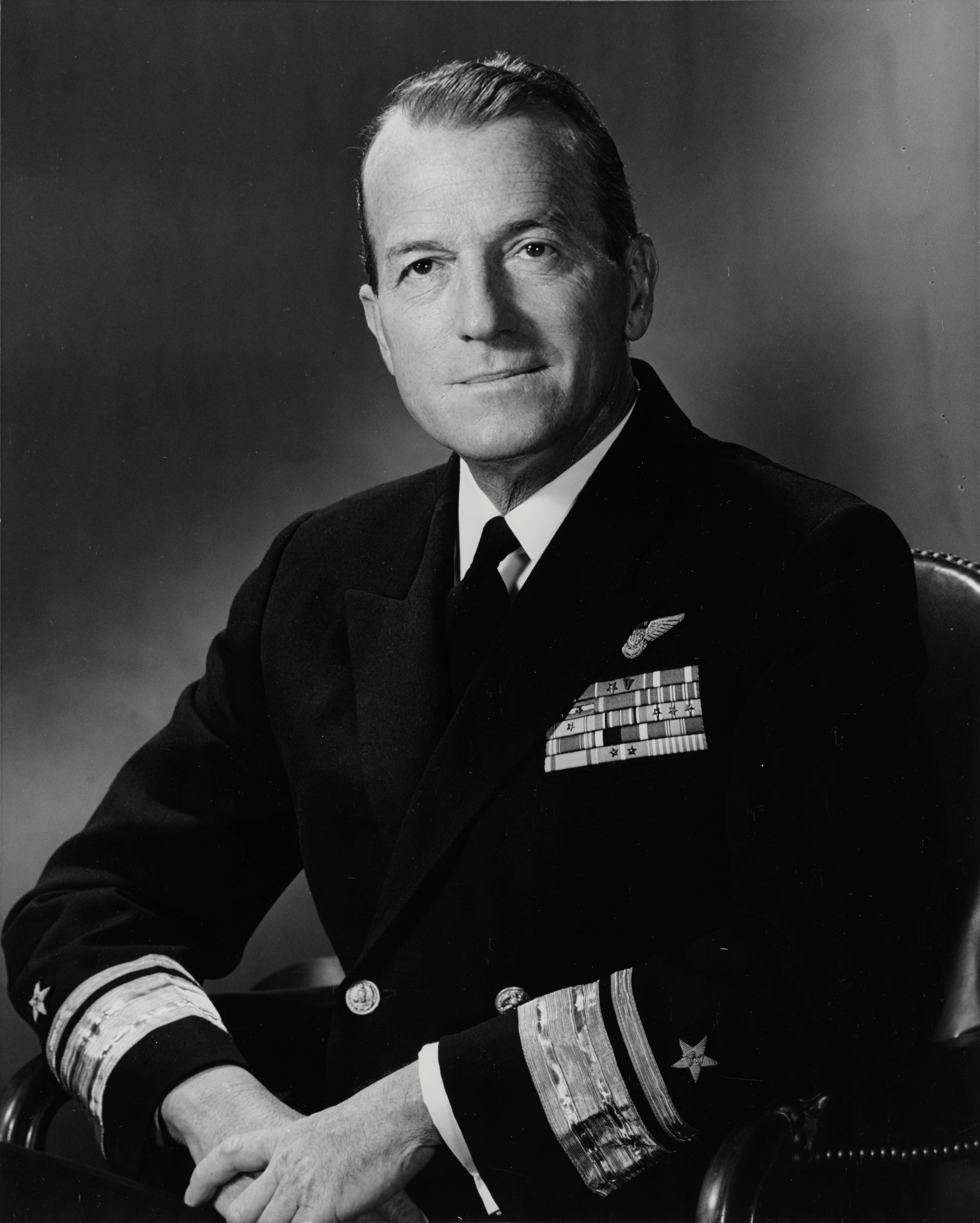
- Robert Dixon in 1957
- Born: April 22, 1906; Richland, Georgia, US
- Died: October 21, 1981 (aged 75); Virginia Beach, Virginia, US
- Burial place: Woodlawn Memorial Gardens
- Military career
- Allegiance: United States
- Branch: United States Navy
- Rank: Rear Admiral
- Commands: USS Valley Forge
- Conflicts: World War II: Battle of the Coral Sea; Korean War
- Awards: Navy Cross (2); Legion of Merit (3)

Robert Ellington Dixon (April 22, 1906 – October 21, 1981) was a United States Navy admiral and aviator, whose radio message "Scratch one flat top" during the Battle of the Coral Sea became quickly famous, as his unit of dive bombers contributed to the first sinking of a Japanese aircraft carrier in the Pacific theater of the Second World War. Dixon would go on to serve on four other carriers during the war and commanded USS Valley Forge during the Korean War. Dixon was a 1927 graduate of the U.S. Naval Academy. He was awarded two Navy Crosses. The first was awarded for scouting operations against Japanese forces over Lae and Salamaua, New Guinea in March 1942

The second Navy Cross was awarded for his success in the Battle of the Coral Sea. He also received three Legions of Merit: (1) for airstrikes against the Buka-Bonis area, Bougainville, and at Rabaul in November 1943; (2) as commanding officer of the USS Valley Forge from January to June 1953; and (3) for services as Chief, Bureau of Aeronautics from July 1957 to November 1959.

Promoted to rear admiral on July 1, 1955, Dixon served as Assistant Chief for Plans and Programs at the Bureau of Aeronautics. As Assistant Chief, he was responsible for all development work on the new McDonnell Douglas F-4 Phantom II jet fighter. Dixon later served as Chief of the Bureau from July 1957 to November 1959.

He died on October 21, 1981, at the age of 75 at Virginia Beach.
