= Woodlawn, Alabama =

Woodlawn, Alabama is a community in Jefferson County, Alabama, which is now a neighborhood within the city of Birmingham, Alabama. It grew as an independent community, and became the City of Woodlawn, and built a substantial City Hall building in 1908, but was annexed by Birmingham in 1910. The community area experienced a surge of growth after it was annexed.

== Woodlawn Historic District ==
- Woodlawn Historic District
- U.S. National Register of Historic Places
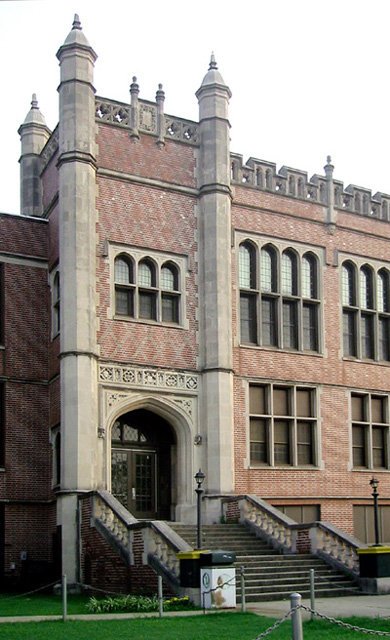
- Woodlawn High School (1922)

- Location within Alabama
- Location: Roughly bounded by 1st Ave. N, 47th St. N, 61st St.N, and I-20/59, Birmingham, Alabama
- Coordinates: 33°32′25″N 86°45′27″W
- Area: 241 acres (0.98 km^{2})
- Architectural style: Queen Anne, Late 19th and 20th Century Revivals
- NRHP reference No.: 03001129
- Added to NRHP: November 17, 2003

The Woodlawn Historic District in Birmingham, Alabama is a 241 acres (0.98 km^{2}) historic district which was listed on the National Register of Historic Places in 2003. It included 608 contributing buildings and a contributing site, as well as 89 non-contributing buildings. It comprises much of the original city of Woodlawn, including its city hall, but the district also reflects much development after it was annexed into Birmingham. The boundaries were defined to include "surviving portions of the Woodlawn neighborhood which retain sufficient historic character and resources to convey a sense of the district's historical development. Areas excluded from the district generally possessed higher ratios of noncontributing to contributing resources."

The district includes 14 contributing resources already listed on the National Register as the Woodlawn Commercial Historic District, which itself includes the Woodlawn City Hall, already itself separately listed on the National Register. The core commercial area includes mostly brick buildings, one- to three-stories tall, with architecture representative of late-nineteenth and early twentieth century styles. Prominent buildings in the core area include:

- Woodlawn City Hall (1908), Beaux Arts style
- Woodlawn Fire Station (c.1930), romantic French revival style
- Woodlawn Methodist Church (1909–12), Victorian Gothic Revival style (Destroyed by fire on May 31, 2009).
- Woodlawn Masonic Building (1915)
- Woodlawn High School (1922), Tudor Revival style, with an associated gymnasium and stadium
- Grace Episcopal Church (c.1910)
- Woodlawn Public Library (1950), modern style.
- Wood Family Cemetery (1824), only resource documented to be older than 1880,

The district is roughly bounded by 1st Ave. N, 47th St. N, 61st St. N, and Interstate 20/59. It includes Queen Anne and various late 19th and early 20th century Revival styles.

== History ==
The Hawkins, Riley, Eubank and John Smith families arrived in 1815-16 and may have been the first European-descended settlers in the area.

Early houses included "Woodlawn", the home of Obadiah Washington Wood Sr. on the Georgia Road, and "Willow Wood", residence of Edmund Wood, which was located where Willow Wood Park is now. O.W. Wood Sr. established the first general store, the first post office (in 1832, when the community was known as Rockville), and first saw mill in the area. He also granted "rights of way for railroad and streetcar construction, and donat[ed] land for four churches, a school, and for the settlement of former slaves at nearby Zion City.

A church shared by all denominations in what were known as "Union services" was built on land donated by Obadiah Washington Wood, Sr., at what is now 56th Street and Second Ave., where the Woodlawn Elementary School was later located.

The Wood Family Cemetery holds about 150 graves starting around 1824, including those of seven generations of the Wood family, from Obadiah and Edmund Wood on. The cemetery is about 2 acres (0.81 ha) on 57th Street North at First Avenue.

"Like other settlements in the county, Woodlawn appears to have remained a sparsely populated agricultural region well into the mid-nineteenth century, attractive to settlers for its convenient location on the Georgia Road and its fertile, well-watered valley land."

It had population 89 in 1880, then 1506 in 1890.

The first churches were "established by the Baptists in 1886, Methodists in 1887, and Presbyterians in 1888. The Georgia Pacific Railroad (later Alabama Great Southern) was completed by 1883 and the Central of Georgia (later Seaboard Coast) and Birmingham Mineral line by 1888. The community was renamed Woodlawn in 1886, and, January 26, 1891, it was incorporated under a municipal government. Boundaries of the new city extended generally from 47th Street to 65th Street, between 12th Avenue North and 7th Avenue South."

Street car services supported great growth.

It was annexed into Birmingham on January 1, 1910. This greatly improved city services and led to much development and growth.
