= Woodlawn (Vernon Hill, Virginia) =

Historic house in Virginia, United States

- Formerly listed on the U.S. National Register of Historic Places
- Virginia Landmarks Register
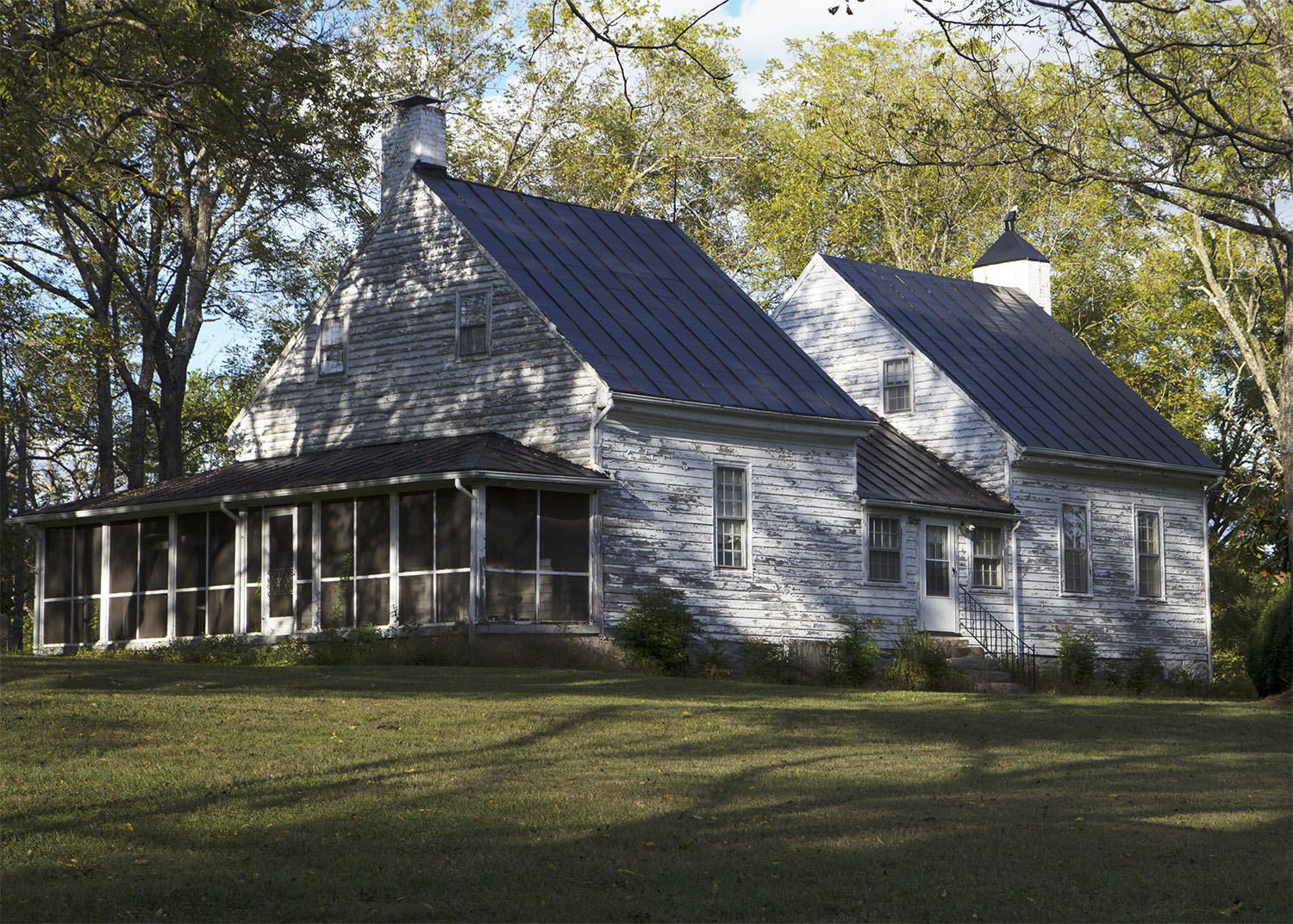
- Seen in 2013, before its destruction

- Location within Virginia Location within the United States
- Location: 5321 Henrys Mill Rd., Vernon Hill, Virginia
- Coordinates: 36°46′35″N 79°9′47″W
- Area: 8 acres (3.2 ha)
- Built: c. 1815
- Architectural style: Federal
- NRHP reference No.: 05000478
- VLR No.: 071-0037

Significant dates
- Added to NRHP: May 26, 2005
- Designated VLR: March 16, 2005
- Removed from NRHP: February 21, 2017
- Delisted VLR: September 15, 2016

Woodlawn, also known as Woodlawn Plantation, was a historic home and farm complex located near Vernon Hill, Pittsylvania County, Virginia. It was built about 1815, and was a relatively small but unusual, two-part manor house. It consisted of two 1 1/2-story main blocks connected by a hyphen, that are nearly identical in size, shape, and materials. The house was of heavy timber-frame construction sheathed in weatherboard. The interior featured Federal style decorative details. Also on the property the contributing early-19th century log smokehouse, and a family cemetery.

It was listed on the National Register of Historic Places in 2005. The house was demolished in 2015 and removed from the National Register in 2017.

This is one of five historic houses in Virginia that are named "Woodlawn". Others can be found listed under Woodlawn, Virginia.
