= Woodlawn Cemetery =

Woodlawn Cemetery may refer to:

== Canada ==
- Woodlawn Cemetery (Saskatoon), Saskatchewan

== United States ==
=== Illinois ===
- Woodlawn Cemetery (Carbondale, Illinois)
- Woodlawn Cemetery (Forest Park, Illinois), including Showmen's Rest

=== Massachusetts ===
- Woodlawn Cemetery (Clinton, Massachusetts)
- Woodlawn Cemetery (Everett, Massachusetts)

=== Michigan ===
- Woodlawn Cemetery (Detroit), Michigan
- Woodland Cemetery (Monroe, Michigan)

=== New York (state) ===
- Woodlawn Cemetery (Bronx), New York
- Woodlawn Cemetery (Canandaigua, New York)
- Woodlawn Cemetery (Elmira, New York), which includes:
  - Woodlawn National Cemetery

=== Other states and territories ===
- Woodlawn Cemetery (West Palm Beach, Florida)
- Woodlawn Cemetery Gates and Shelter, Washington, Iowa
- Woodlawn Cemetery (Westbrook, Maine)
- Woodlawn Cemetery (Las Vegas, Nevada)
- Woodlawn Cemetery (Toledo, Ohio)
- Woodlawn Cemetery (Sioux Falls, South Dakota)
- Woodlawn Cemetery (Washington, D.C.)
- Woodlawn Cemetery (Fairmont, West Virginia)
- Woodlawn Cemetery (Green Bay, Wisconsin)

== See also ==
- Woodland Cemetery (disambiguation)
- Woodlawn Baptist Church and Cemetery, Nutbush, Tennessee
- Woodlawn Garden of Memories Cemetery, Houston, Texas
- Woodlawn Memorial Cemetery (Santa Monica, California)
- Woodlawn Memorial Park (Colma, California)
- Woodlawn Memorial Park (Nashville, Tennessee)
- Woodlawn Memorial Gardens, Norfolk, Virginia
- Woodlawn (disambiguation)
