= Woodlawn, Virginia =

Woodlawn may refer to:

- Woodlawn, Carroll County, Virginia
- Woodlawn, Fairfax County, Virginia
  - Woodlawn (Alexandria, Virginia), an historic house in Fairfax County, Virginia
- Woodlawn Quaker Meetinghouse in Fort Belvoir, Fairfax County
- Woodlawn (Oilville, Virginia), an historic house in Goochland County, Virginia
- Woodlawn, Pittsylvania County, Virginia
  - Woodlawn (Vernon Hill, Virginia), a home in Pittsylvania County, Virginia
