= Woodlawn (Oilville, Virginia) =

Historic house in Virginia, United States

- U.S. National Register of Historic Places
- Virginia Landmarks Register
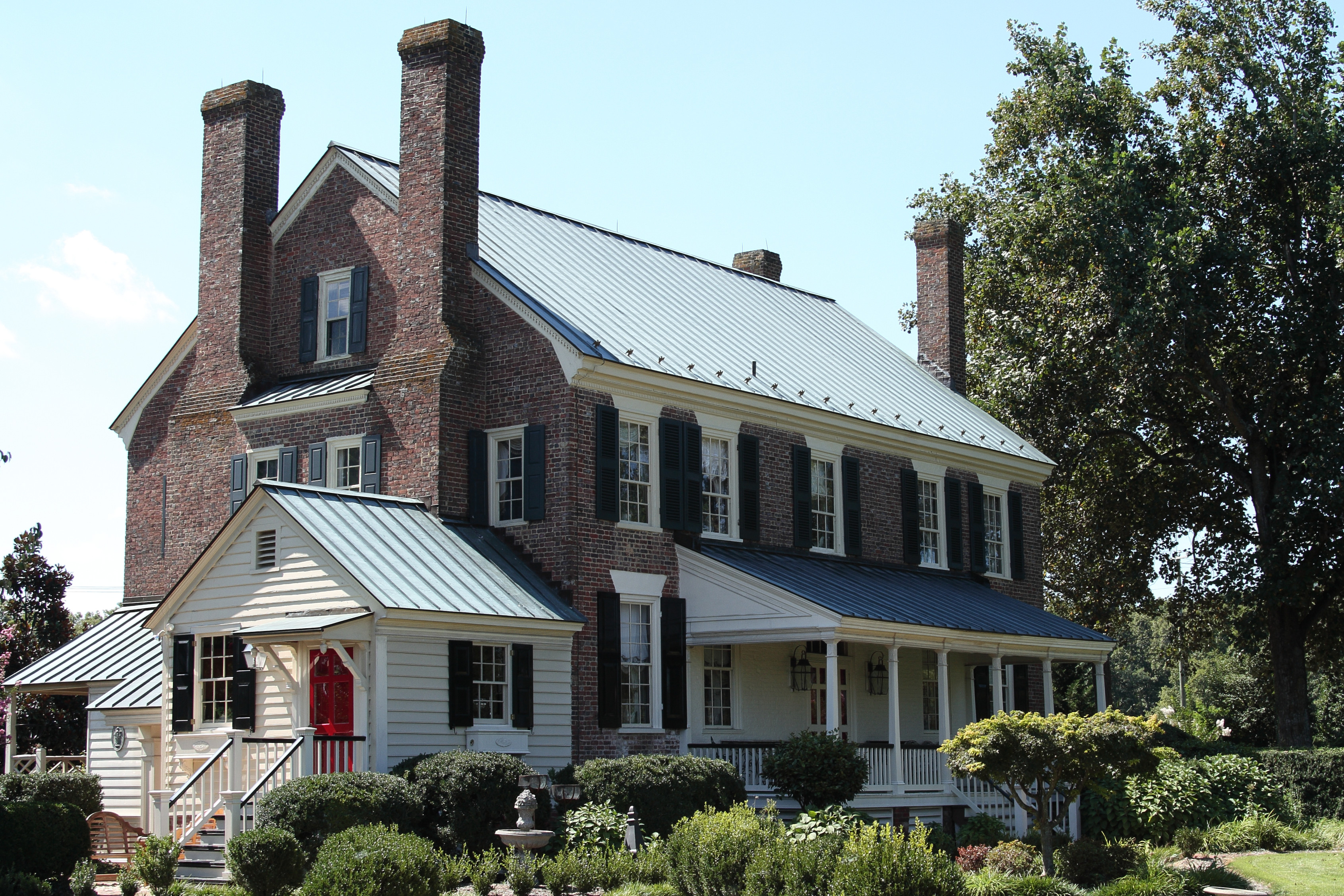

- Location within Virginia Location within the United States
- Location: SE of Oilville at jct. of VA 250 and VA 612, near Oilville, Virginia
- Coordinates: 37°41′5″N 77°44′12″W
- Area: 9.9 acres (4.0 ha)
- Architectural style: Federal
- NRHP reference No.: 71000978
- VLR No.: 037-0035

Significant dates
- Added to NRHP: December 16, 1971
- Designated VLR: July 6, 1971

Woodlawn is a historic home located near Oilville, Goochland County, Virginia. It is dated to the late 18th century, and is a two-story, five-bay brick structure with 12 fireplaces in the Federal style. It has a small porch supported on four evenly spaced square columns with Ionic order capitals added around 1810. The house still has much of its original glass and original woodwork, and a formal boxwood garden with some of the box trees well over a century old. A one-story frame kitchen and a long frame porch were both added in 1937.

This is the oldest of five historic houses in Virginia that are named "Woodlawn". Others can be found listed under Woodlawn, Virginia.

It was listed on the National Register of Historic Places in 1971.
