= Woodlawn Commercial Historic District =

Historic district in Alabama, United States

- U.S. National Register of Historic Places
- U.S. Historic district
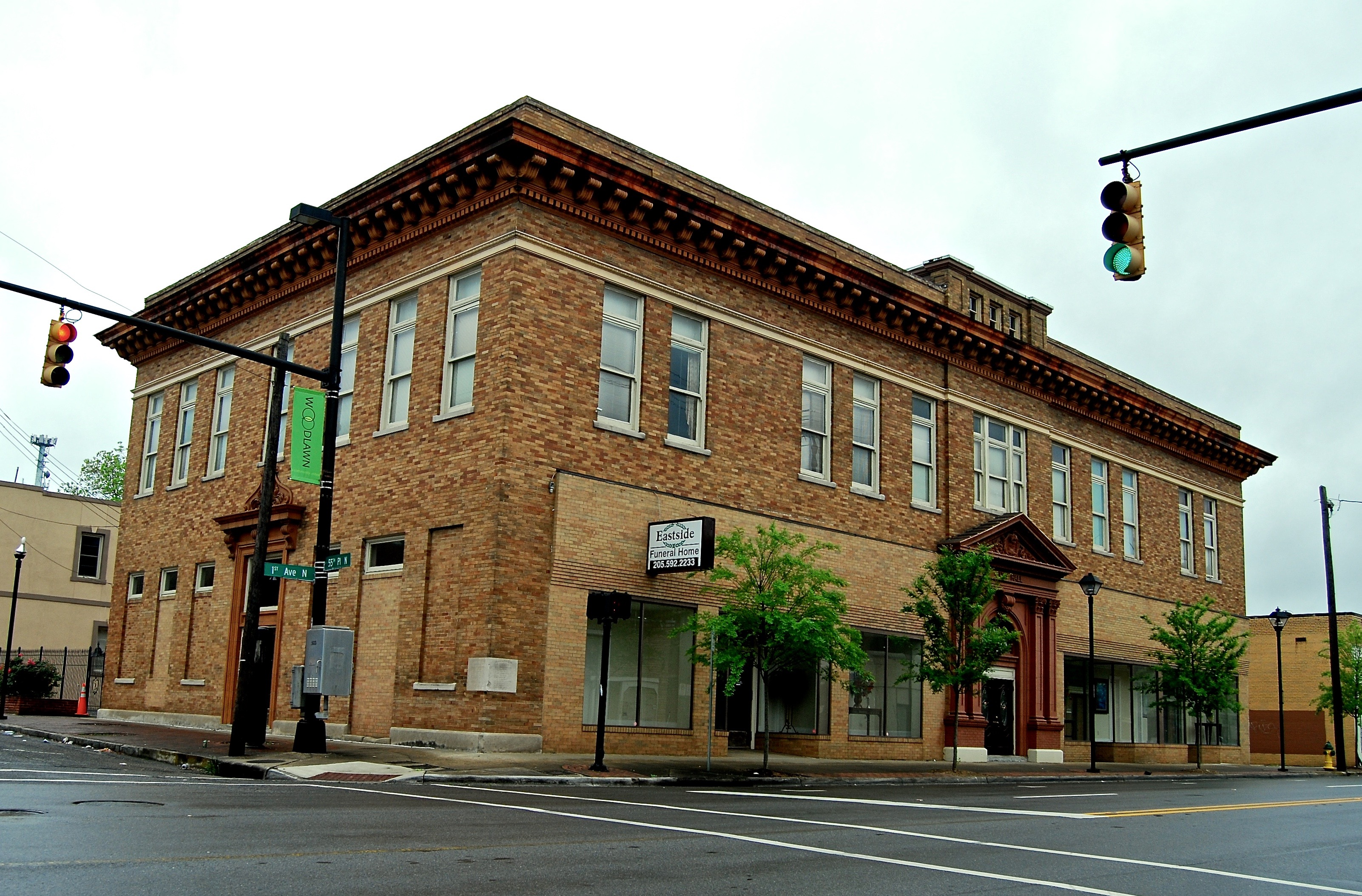
- Woodlawn City Hall

- Location within Alabama
- Location: Area around jct. of 1st Ave. N. and 55th Pl., Birmingham, Alabama
- Coordinates: 33°32′24″N 86°45′09″W
- Area: 6 acres (2.4 ha)
- Architectural style: Beaux Arts, Gothic Revival, Commercial Style
- Part of: Woodlawn Historic District
- NRHP reference No.: 90002179
- Added to NRHP: January 25, 1991

The Woodlawn Commercial Historic District, in Birmingham, Alabama, was listed on the National Register of Historic Districts in 1991. It is a 6 acres (2.4 ha) district which included 12 contributing buildings and four non-contributing buildings in an area around the junction of 1st Avenue North and 55th Place in Birmingham, at the center of the community of Woodlawn, Alabama, which for a time was a separate city before being absorbed into Birmingham. A much larger portion of the community, including all of this Commercial historic district and residential areas as well, was later listed on the National Register as Woodlawn Historic District.

== Architecture ==
The Woodlawn Commercial Historic District is roughly L-shaped along 1st Avenue North, running northeast to southwest, and along perpendicular 55th Place. All buildings were constructed between 1908 and 1935. It was noted that the district contains "a wide range of building types associated with a small, early twentieth-century suburban community; such as a church and church-related school (inventory #2, 1), a city hall (inventory #12), a fraternal lodge (inventory #3), and a variety of small commercial and professional buildings (inv. #9-11,13-18). Most all of the buildings located within the district are constructed in brick. One building has been covered in smooth stucco (inventory #11). Stone and terra cotta is used throughout the district as decorative elements (inventory #2, 3, 9, 10, 12, 13, 18). Many of the buildings are highlighted by decorative brick corbelled cornices (inventory #3, 9, 14, 15, 16, 17). The buildings within the district range in height from one, two, and three stories. All of the commercial buildings have flat or parapet roofs. Because of the urban location of the district, all of the buildings are situated close to the street and are either attached to one another or are separated only by an alley." It includes Beaux Arts, Gothic Revival, and Commercial Style architecture.

== Notable contributing properties ==
Selected buildings in the district are:

- Woodlawn City Hall (1908), which was already separately listed on the National Register. The city hall functioned as such for only a few years before the city was absorbed into Birmingham.
- Woodlawn Methodist Episcopal Church, South (1909–12), Victorian Gothic Revival, the only stone building in the district, with a three-story square tower. (The church was destroyed by fire on May 31, 2009).
- Church school of the Woodlawn M.E. Church. South (1924 main; c.1950 ell addition), 118 North 55th Street, a three-story Tudor Revival building, red brick with stone accents.
- Woodlawn Masonic Building (1915), 5502 1st Avenue North, northeast corner at 55th St. North. Three-story building of brown brick with stone details, flat roof with an elaborate brick corbelled cornice, with arched windows on third floor and flat-topped windows on second floor.
- 5522 1st Avenue North (1928), holding Boogs Block-Burch Antiques, also a corner, a two-story building of red brick with stone details and an elaborate corbelled cornice, with narrow windows having stone lintels and sills on second floor, with original storefront features including recessed entrances, transoms, and pressed tin.
- 5519 1st Avenue North (1935), originally White House Sandwich Shop, later offices. Streamline Moderne-style one-story commercial building located on an alley; built of brick stuccoed over; has a curved corner and glass block windows.
