= Woodlawn Memorial Gardens =

Cemetery in Norfolk, Virginia, US

Coordinates: 36°51′3.4″N 76°11′8.4″W

- Interactive map of Woodlawn Memorial Gardens

Details
- Established: 1958
- Location: Norfolk, Virginia
- Country: United States
- Size: 75 acres (30 ha)

Woodlawn Memorial Gardens is a cemetery located in Norfolk, Virginia, USA. Established as a private, family owned cemetery in 1958, Woodlawn Memorial Gardens encompasses seventy-five acres of land, 40 of which are undeveloped, at the Norfolk and Virginia Beach borders in Southeastern Virginia adjacent to Virginia Beach Boulevard and Newtown Road. Woodlawn has seventeen gardens including three Veteran's sections, a large community mausoleum, two semi-private mausoleums, an Orthodox Jewish section, and private family compounds.

== List of gardens ==
- Babyland
- Garden of Meditation
- Garden of Christus
- Avenue of States
- Avenue of History
- Avenue of Flags
- Garden of St. Luke
- Garden of The Ten Commandments
- Masonic Garden
- Garden of Faith
- Garden of Devotion
- Garden of Peace
- Garden of Life
- Garden of The Apostles
- Garden of Serenity
- Chinese Garden
- Garden of King David
- Meditation Estates - Cremation and Traditional Burial - Hedge & Walled Estates
- Eternal Light Mausoleum
- Good Shepherd Mausoleum
- Reflection Estates

== Notable burials ==
- Master Chief Petty Officer (Master Diver) Carl Brashear
- Rear Admiral Robert E. Dixon
- Gunnery Sergeant Carlos Hathcock
- Noel Franklin Major
- Vice Admiral Edmund B. Taylor
