= Woodlawn Farm =

Woodlawn Farm may refer to:

- Woodlawn Farm (Jacksonville, Illinois), listed on the NRHP in Illinois
- Woodlawn Farm (Slate Hill, New York), listed on the NRHP in New York
- Woodlawn Farm (Washington Courthouse, Ohio), listed on the NRHP in Ohio
