= Hranov =

Hranov, feminine: Hranova is a Bulgarian surname.

- Atanas Hranov, Bulgarian painter and sculptor
- Elena Hranova (1887–1976), Bulgarian actress
- Lyubomir Hranov, Bulgarian international footballer
- Margarita Hranova, Bulgarian singer
- Nenko Hranov (1850–1936), Bulgarian freedom fighter and National Assembly member
