= Alexander Bogomazov =

Ukrainian avant-garde artist (1880–1930)

Oleksandr Bohomazov Олександр Богомазов
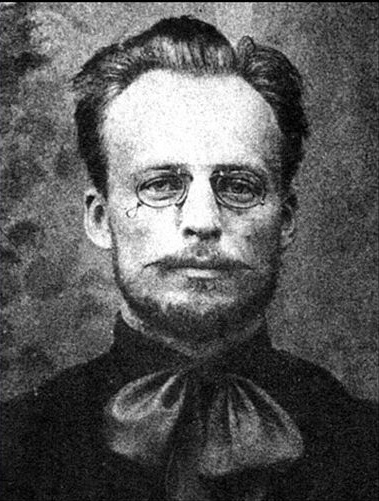
- Born: March 26, 1880; Yampil, Russian Empire (now Ukraine)
- Died: June 3, 1930 (age 50); Kyiv, Ukrainian SSR, Soviet Union
- Known for: Painting, Drawing
- Movement: Cubism, Futurism, Spectralism
- Spouse: Wanda Monastyrska (m.1913–1930)
- Children: Yaroslava Ivanikova-Bohomazova

Alexander Konstantinovich Bogomazov (Russian: Алекса́ндр Константи́нович Богома́зов) or Oleksandr Kostiantynovych Bohomazov (Ukrainian: Олекса́ндр Костянти́нович Богома́зов; March 26, 1880 – June 3, 1930) was a Ukrainian painter, cubo-futurist, modern art theoretician and is recognised as one of the key figures of the Ukrainian avant-garde scene. In 1914, Oleksandr wrote his treatise The Art of Painting and the Elements. In it he analyzed the interaction between Object, Artist, Picture, and Spectator and sets the theoretical foundation of modern art. During his artistic life Oleksandr Bohomazov mastered several art styles. The most known are Cubo-Futurism (1913–1917) and Spectralism (1920–1930).

== Early life ==
Oleksandr Bohomazov was born in Yampil, Kharkiv Region (now Sumy Oblast, Ukraine) as a second child to Kostiantyn & Anisia Bohomazov. His father was an accountant, who worked at the local sugar factory and later rose to the status of a merchant. As a boy he hardly knew his mother, as she left the family and remarried a visiting military officer.

Oleksandr started to show early interest in painting while studying at the gymnasium. However, his father did not approve of his style, considering it too raw, and insisted that the boy graduate from the Kherson Agricultural School, where he majored in agronomy from 1896 to 1902. But the passion for art prevailed, and with the support of his uncle, Oleksandr, convinces his father to allow him to move to Kyiv and enter the Kyiv Academy of Arts in 1902.

In Kyiv Art School, Bohomazov was taught by Oleksandr Murashko and Ivan Seleznev, while Oleksandra Ekster and Oleksandr Arkhypenko, future stars of the avant-garde, studied with him. In 1905, he was expelled from the school due to his participation in political demonstrations and strikes. As of 1906, he studied in the Kyiv studio of Serhiy Sviatoslavskyi and spent the summer of 1907 in Crimea with Oleksa Hryshchenko and Vladimir Denisov, fellow-students in the Sviatoslavskyi studio. They rented a wooden house in Vorontsovsky Park just outside Alupka, 8 miles south-west of Yalta, and sketched from dawn till dusk.

Bohomazov thereupon left for Moscow, studying under Konstantin Yuon and Fyodor Rerberg (alongside Malevych), before returning to Kyiv in 1908 to participate in the city's first Modernist exhibition, Zveno (‘The Link’) together with David Burliuk, Wladimir Burliuk, Oleksandra Ekster and others.

== Artistic Periods ==
=== The Finnish Cycle, 1911 ===
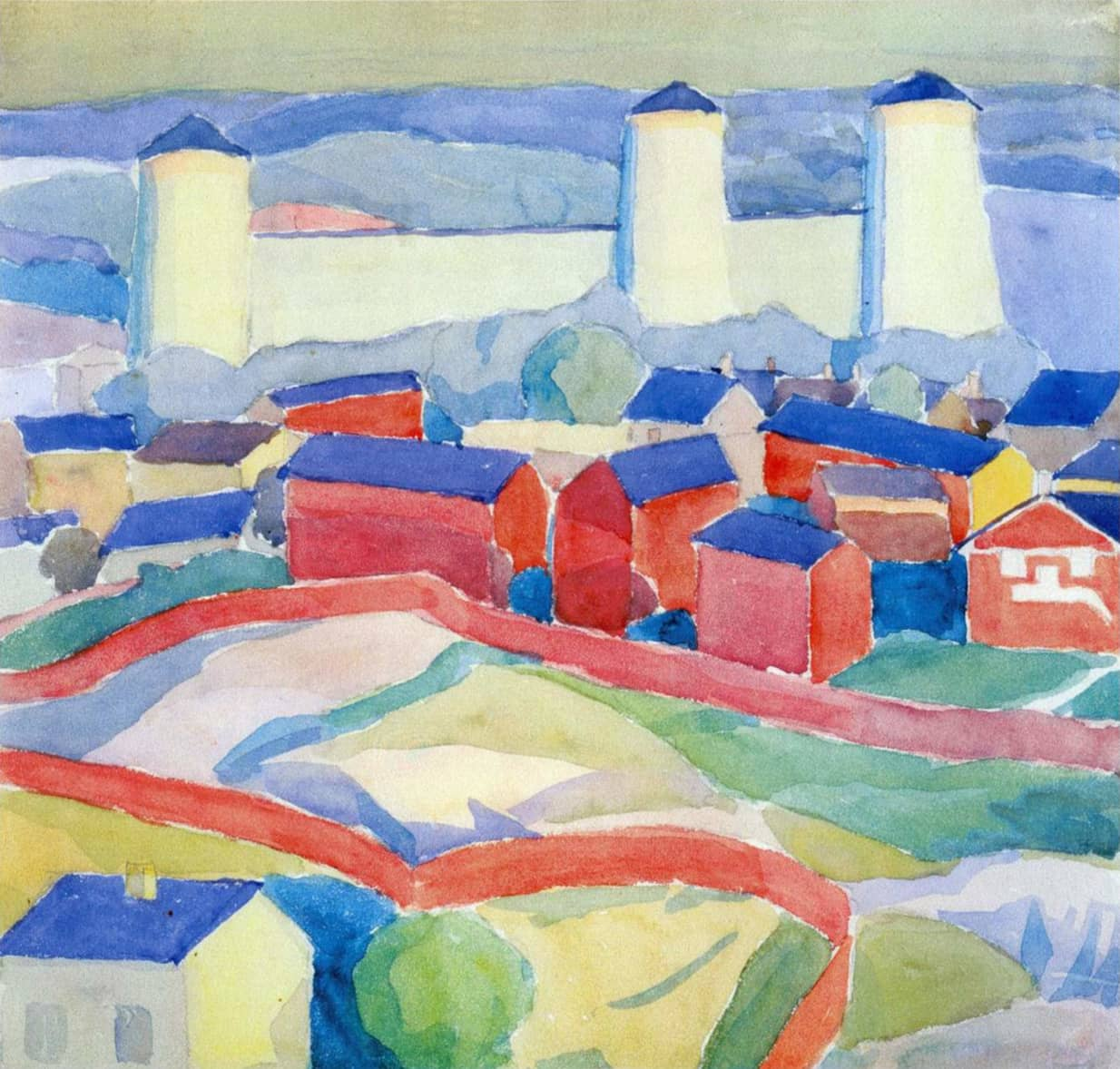
A Castle in Finland, 1911

In June 1911, while working part-time in the newspaper Kyivska Dumka (Kyivan Thought), Bohomazov was sent on a business trip to Karelia (back then, Russian Empire, now Finland & Russia), to create paintings and prints of Finnish landscapes for an illustrated supplement to the newspaper.

For one and a half months Bohomazov was travelling along the touristic route along Imatra, Lappeenranta, Vyborg, Punkaharju, Savonlinna. This trip resulted in dozens of paintings, watercolours, and inks. The exact number is unknown, and nowadays, the Finnish Cycle is spread out among private collectors and museums.

While visiting Imatra, he painted 'The Tower’ (NAMU) and ‘A Castle in Finland’ (collection of K.Grygoryshyn), both depicting the famous architectural marvel of Grand Hotel de Cascade (now Valtionhotelli). The hotel was built in the form of a castle in Art Nouveau style and is reminiscent of Olavinlinna fortress situated on the other side of Lake Saimaa.

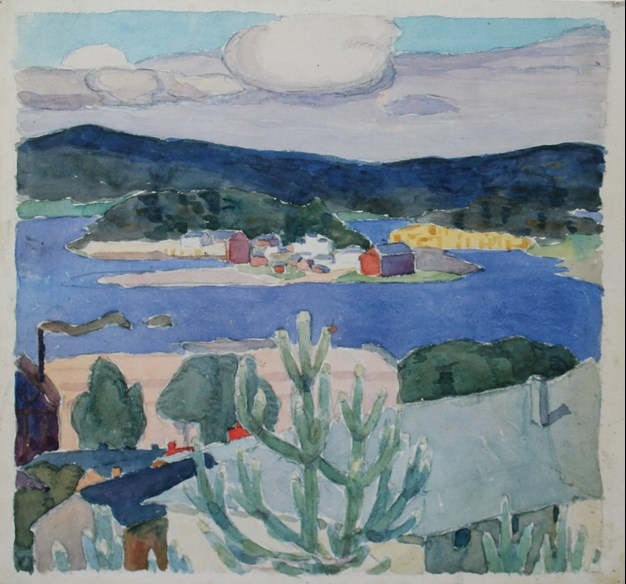
Finnish Landscape, 1911 (NAMU)

Another object of painter's attention were the famous rapids Imatrankoski and Vallinkoski. Bohomazov became very fond of them and was enjoying the peaceful Finnish landscapes, which were in tune with artist's inner world. ‘I was painting Little Imatra in oil, a few days ago (Another name for Vallinkoski. – Author). Painting easily, freely, with joy. I have completed a canvas. I was happy!’, – he reported to his wife-to-be Wanda in a letter home. Here he talks about painting ‘The Sea Waves’ (NAMU), as well as series of watercolours picturing the rapids were created here – ‘Stream and Rocks. Istra River-1’ (NAMU), ‘Wave. Istra River-2’ (NAMU), ‘Waves and Rocks. (Istra River-ІІІ)’ (NAMU), ‘Istra River (Finnish waters)’ (private collection), ‘Stormy River’ (collection of K.Grigorishin). At Lappeenranta, he painted two watercolours: Finland (NAMU) and Finnish Landscape (NAMU).

The trip yielded a number of romantic, White Night drawings and watercolours of scenic highlights near Vyborg – including Monrepos Park, the three-towered Olavinlinna Castle in Savonlinna, and the island-dotted Lake Saimaa, whose ‘fairy-tale beauty’ had been extolled by numerous artists and poets. The lake likewise influenced the romantically inclined artist to dedicate the drawing, to his future wife.

=== Cubo-Futurism Period, 1913–1915 ===
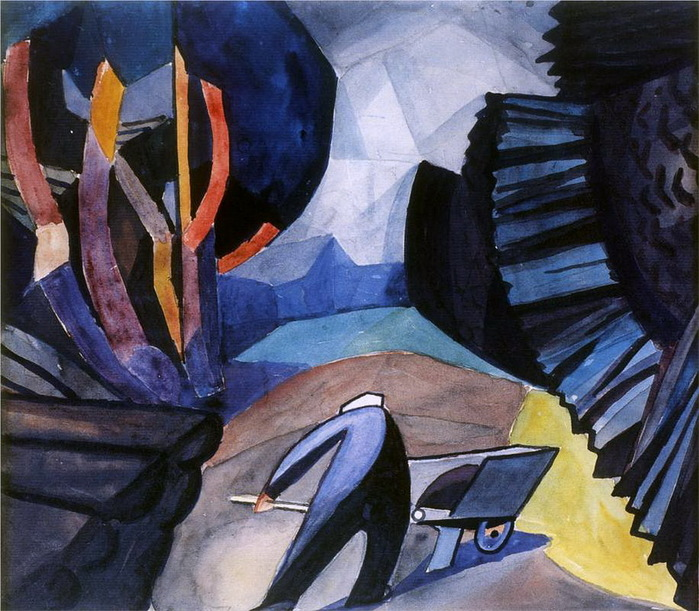
Lumberjack, 1913

Years of 1913–14 became a time of the artist's intense search for ways to develop "new art". In September 1914, Bohomazov finished the theoretical work "Painting and Its Elements", which summarised his reflections on the nature of creativity and its components. The works belonging to the year 1913 were created by Bohomazov, when the main provisions included in his theoretical work had not yet been thought out and formulated, but the style and form-creating elements of these works testify that the master was already familiar with various artistic directions of avant-garde art, in particular and with the futuristic concept of displaying the state of the environment through the demonstration of the movement of the objects that made it.

In the works of this time, he intuitively, rather than consciously, uses a number of techniques that enhance the feeling of movement and convey the dynamism of the depicted object. So, for example, he actively uses a bundle of straight lines that converge and, in turn, form certain ray- and fan-like forms that create a powerful effect of movement. At the same time, the artist often uses such a technique as extending straight lines along their entire length and turning them into needle-like guides, as, for example, in the work "Train".

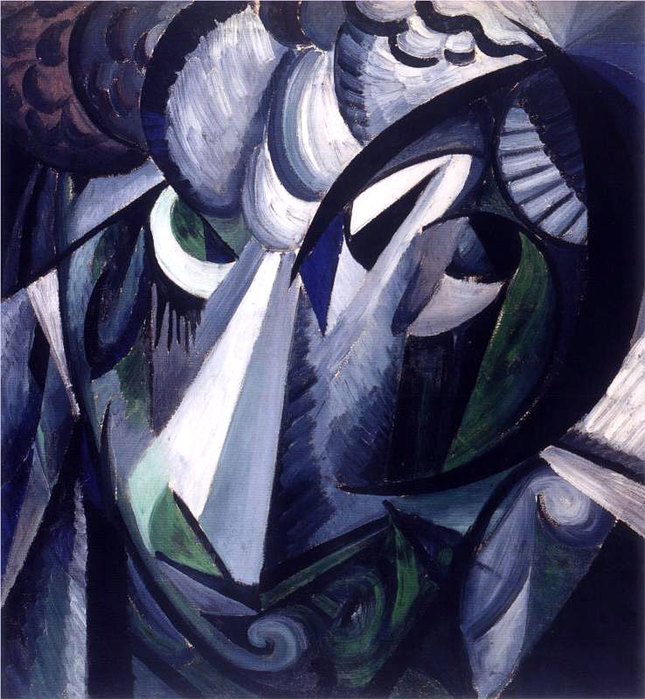
Head Portrait, 1914

The alternation of saturated sharp spots with unfilled empty spaces became for him another means of enriching the artistic language of the works. In a number of works, the artist arranges the forms he uses diagonally and at an angle to the borders of the picture plane. This technique is clearly visible in his painting "Train. Boyarka". This method of constructing the picture plane makes it possible to create the impression of intense dynamic tension and convey the feeling of movement, regardless of whether it is connected to a specific object or insinuates itself. In the works of 1913, the artist pays a lot of attention to a straight line or a group of straight lines, which together create irregular dynamic impulses.

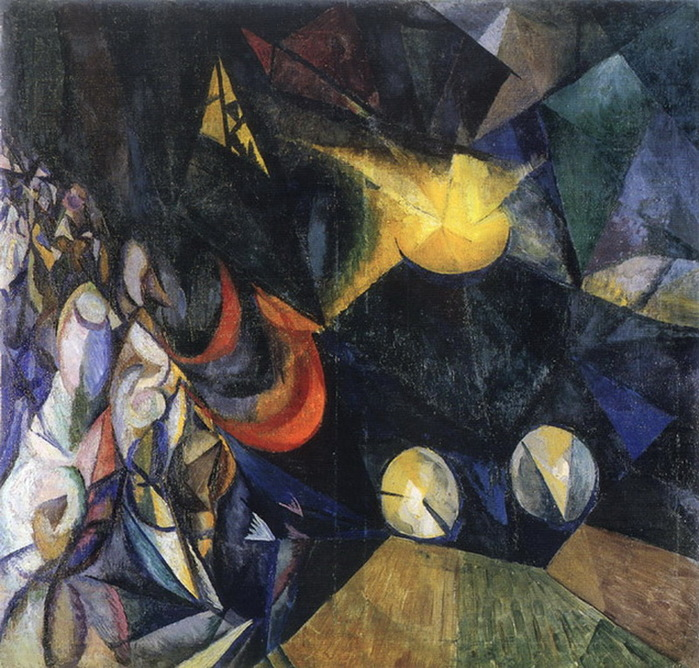
Train, 1915

1914 can be considered a turning point in the artist's work. And not only because the artist finally formulated his ideas about the art of the "New Age" in a theoretical treatise, but also because this year he established himself as an original artist. In 1914, Bohomazov began to consciously use all techniques in the reproduction of nature and its state, which had intuitively matured in previous works. He actively implements the new principles declared in 'Painting and Its Elements'.

In the works of this year, we observe the artist's interest in combining simple flat forms into more complex spatial objects. Bohomazov begins to understand: the planes and straight lines that form them limit the possibility of conveying the dynamism of the object – and he introduces new elements into his artistic lexicon, including various arc-shaped lines.

He also resorts to another new technique – mosaic toning of individual components, that is, fragmentary strengthening of forms, and this gives them a stronger sense of dynamism. At the same time, the structure of the picture alternates with forms with a mass of different saturation. Here we can note that this technique reflects the concept of interval formulated by the artist.

In 1914, he organized the exhibition Kiltse ("The Ring") in Kyiv, where the works of 21 artists were exposed, among others Oleksandra Ekster, Eugène Konopatzky among others. For Bohomazov, this was the first significant exhibition, 88 of his works, mostly graphics, were presented there. Like Kandinsky during the second "Salon", Bohomazov presented his theoretical work "The Essence of Four Elements", in which he explained the principle of the new Cubo-Futurist art: the combination of line, color, form and plane of the picture.

Kiltse was supposed to be the first in a series of exhibitions, but this did not go according to plan. Reviews in the press were positive (indicating the general acceptance of the "new art" in critical circles), but few. In fact, the exhibition was hardly noticed. After the failure of the "Ring", significant avant-garde exhibitions were no longer held in Kyiv until the 20s.

=== Life in Caucasus, 1915-1917 ===
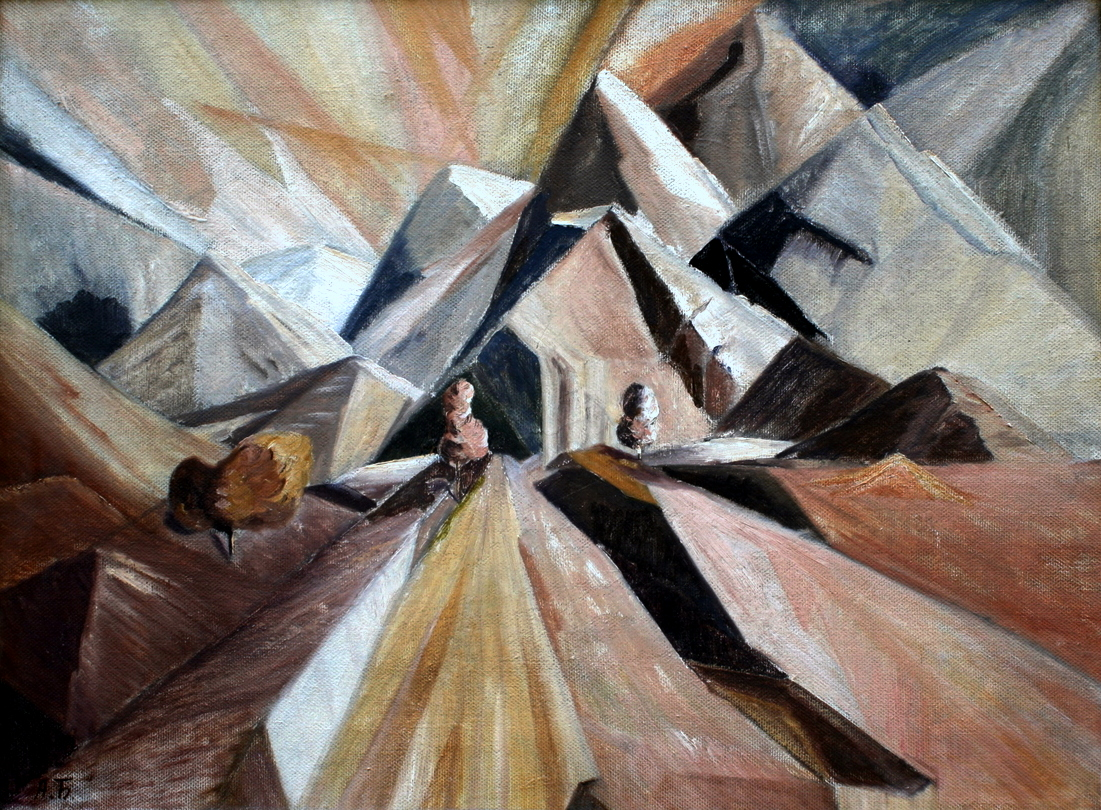
Caucasus, Karabakh, 1915

From 1915 until the end of 1917, Bohomazov lived in the Caucasus. He worked as a teacher of painting and drawing in the village of Geryusy (now the city of Goris, Armenia). ‘The air is clear, you can see for miles, and everything seems in blossom,’ he wrote to his wife. Works from his productive stay include a bright 1915 painting The Caucasus and a 1916 charcoal View of the Caucasus as seen from his balcony. The picturesque nature of the Caucasus region had inspired Bohomazov to create numerous other cubo-futuristic canvases, which were later on collated under the cycle 'Memories of Caucasus'. For some time, his wife Wanda stayed with him in Geryusy.

After returning to Kyiv in the end of 1917, Bohomazov started teaching across numerous high schools and art academies, to be able to support his family financially.

=== Introducing Spectralism, 'The Sawmill', late 1910s–1920s ===
In 1917, the anti-Establishment artist welcomed the ideas of October Revolution, joining Olexandra Exter in Agitprop decoration of trains and boats. Yet, contrary to the later development and interpretation of Bolshevik Revolution, he saw the fall of Russian Empire and the ideas of revolution as contributing to the release of Ukrainian national artistic potential, and in tune with the proclamation of Ukrainian Independence of 1917-18. His speech to the first All-Ukrainian Artists’ Congress in June 1918 was that of a fiercely patriotic artist, slamming art schools for sticking to ‘guidelines from the North’ (i.e. Russia) where ‘the spirit of Academism destroys the mind’ and young Ukrainian artists had been ‘deprived of their individuality, while their souls poisoned’.

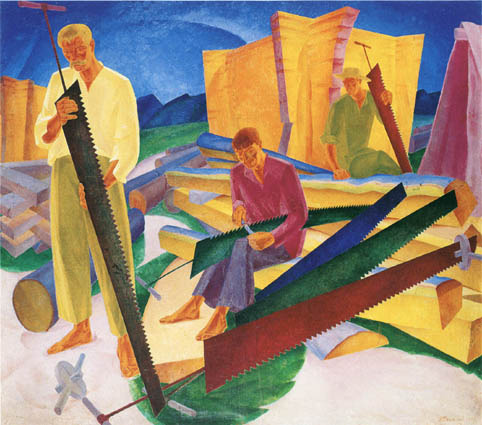
Tuning Saws, 1927

While teaching, Bohomazov continues with his analysis of art theory throughout the 1920s, creating his own colour charts, exploring the effect of contrast in variation of colour tonalities. Whilst Bohomazov's theories remain to be further thoroughly studied, his innovative ideas were formalised in 1927 as part of the set course at the Kyiv Art Institute. Same year, he became the founding member of the Association of the Revolutionary Masters of Ukraine (ARMU), together with David Burliuk, Vadym Meller, Viktor Palmov, Vasyl Yermylov and others.

In 1927, Oleksandr Bohomazov began the last and one of the most ambitious projects of his career – triptych 'The Sawmill'. This work became the culmination of his creative life and took his style to new level, with the artist himself calling it Spectralism.

The format of the triptych was also unique for that art period, and is known to be the only triptych art piece of the Ukrainian and Russian avant-garde. 'The Sawmill' embodied the main views of Bohomazov, set forth in the treatise "Painting and Its Elements". It took 3 years for Bohomazov to create the work, with more than 300 sketches created for this picture. Only two of the three paintings were finalised before the artist death in June 1930. The third piece exists in a form of a final draft piece. The paintings from 'Sawmills' were exhibited in the Soviet pavilion at the Venice Biennale in 1930. It was later also taken for exhibitions in Sweden in 1931 and in Japan in 1932.

The work was significantly damaged during the trip to the Venice Biennale and during the next world "tour", immediately after its creation. It was since then stored in the 'Special Fund' of NAMU, which was miraculously left intact during the Soviet rule & Nazi occupation. The work 'Tuning Saws' was exhibited for the first time in 90 years in 2019 as part of the NAMU exhibition 'Bohomazov: Creative Laboratory', after a three-year restoration.

== Personal life ==
Bohomazov met his wife Wanda Monastyrska, also an artist, in 1908 at the Kyiv Academy of Arts, where they were both studying. Being in an emotionally low period of his life due to conflict with his father, who disapproved of his choice of career and refused to help him materially, meeting Wanda was a true rescue for the artist.

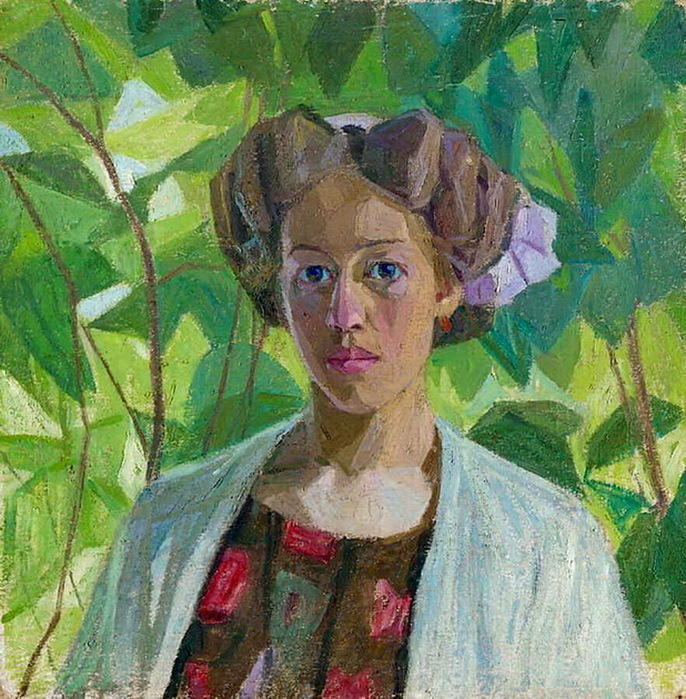
Portrait of Wanda, 1915

Oleksandr was smitten with Wanda on first sight but, she initially rejected him. Yet, after years of Bohomazov's efforts, their relationship grew, and gradually Wanda became not only Bohomazov's main inspiration, but also his biggest support. The couple married in 1913 in Boyarka. In 1917, Wanda gave birth to their daughter, Yaroslava. Their marriage sparked Bohomazov's creative genius, making 1913–15 his most creatively productive period.

Oleksandr painted his wife on more than 30 occasions and the evolution of their relationship can be tracked through Bohomazov's portrayals of his wife. While the initial portraits of Wanda from 1908 to 1911 were very gentle and touching, the 1914 view of Wanda reading is more daring (they were now married). By 1915, his images of Wanda had evolved into something far stronger, more confident and sexually charged.

Around 1920, Oleksandr caught tuberculosis, which was not curable at the time. His disease had been straining his health for almost a decade, and on June 3, 1930, Bohomazov died. He is buried on the Lukyanivsky Cemetery in Kyiv.

After his death, Wanda single-handedly preserved his works from the Soviet authorities and Nazi invaders, until Bohomazov's artistic legacy came back to the spotlight in 1990s.

== Theoretical Work & Teaching ==
Bohomazov's theoretical work deserves a separate outmost recognition. In 1914, while living in the small suburban town of Boyarka, near Kyiv, the artist wrote a treatise called "Painting and Its Elements". In it, Bohomazov traced the genesis of the artistic form, which arises from the moment of movement of its primary element – the dot. Referring to the elements of painting — line, form, painting mass, environment, etc., Bohomazov operates with these concepts, understanding them in dynamics, analysing painting as a complex system that is constantly changing, living according to its internal laws.

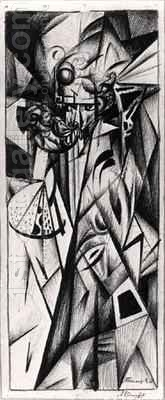
Self-portrait, 1916, Kröller-Müller Museum, Netherlands

In "Painting and Its Elements", for the first time, rhythm is considered not only as a quantitative, but also a qualitative category, and this was a groundbreaking discovery of the artist. The treatise explains how the artistic personality translates the pace and rhythm of everyday life into the language of painting. It shows how a tranquil picture plane is filled with agitated lines and pictorial forms, with a charge of mobile energy, in much the same manner as our relaxed psyche is agitated and filled with the rhythm of lines and forms of the object which we contemplate. Rhythm has a psychological aspect: it can cause depression or elevate spirits.

Many of the positions of Bohomazov's treatise anticipated the theoretical achievements of "Suprematism" by Kazymyr Malevych (Vitebsk, 1920) and "Point and Line to Plane" by Wassily Kandinsky (written in the winter of 1918–19, published in 1926 at Bauhaus, Dessau). In fact, in "Painting and Its Elements", he considers how a black square on a white background is the “most perfect form”, a year before Malevych’s most famous work. It can be argued that the Ukrainian artist made a significant contribution to the formation of a new anthological position of form in 20th-century art, when it was asserted as a self-sufficient element.

After getting acquainted with this work, the French researcher Andréi Nakov called it "prophetic". Unfortunately, due to the First World War, followed by Ukrainian War for Independence of 1917 and then the anti-Formalist movement of the Soviet decades, the manuscript was never published until interest for Bohomazov's heritage re-emerged in the second half of the 20th century. The treatise was published for the first time only in 1996 in Kyiv.

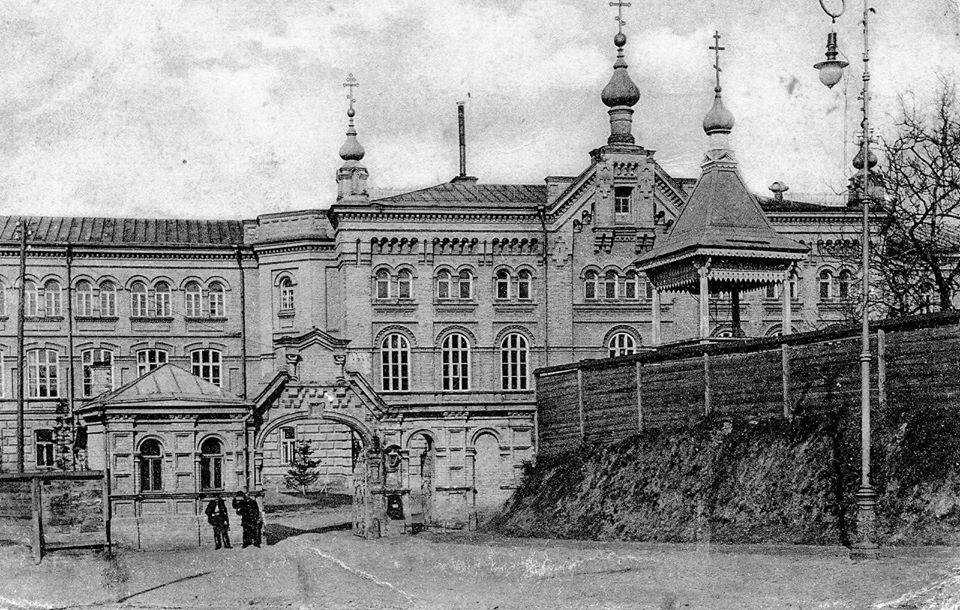
Kyiv Arts Institute, mid-1920s (former building of Kyiv Theological Seminary)

Teaching art had been for Bohomazov not only the way to practice his expertise and share his innovative ideas, but also the means to make ends meet throughout the volatile economic and political period in the beginning of the 20th century in Ukraine. His first teaching experience started in Caucasus in 1915, where he moved to work as a teacher of graphic art in High School of Goris (currently Armenia), until the end of 1917. After coming back to Ukraine, he works in a number of schools – in Zolotonosha (1917), later in Boyarka (1918–1922), sometime having to work on several places at a time.

As of 1919, he also taught at the First State Studio for Paintings and Decorative art in Kyiv. From 1919 to 1920, he was the Head of the Department for Art Education in the Ukrainian Commissariat for Visual Art. At the same time he was the co-founder of the Ukrainian Agitprop Movement, and created designs for the Agitprom movement. From 1922 until his death in 1930, he was professor at the Kyiv Arts Institute (now National Academy of Visual Arts and Architecture), alongside Vadym Meller, Vladimir Tatlin, Viktor Palmov. His unique, at the time, approach to teaching was focused on explaining the evolution of art forms through the lens of historical context and dynamics of social change.

== International Recognition ==
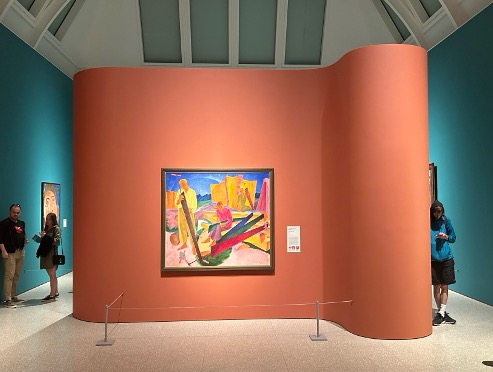
'Tuning Saws' at 'In the Eye of the Storm' Exhibition in Royal Academy of Arts, London, UK, 2024

After artist's death, his name in Soviet Union was forgotten, his works being exposed just once in 1966 in Writers' Union House in Kyiv in the exhibition "Graphics and Art of Oleksandr Bohomazov". Until the early 1970s, the work of Oleksandr Bohomazov remained ignored not only by the Western art historians but also by those of Ukraine. At the end of 1973, thanks to the intermediary of Ukrainian colleagues from Kyiv, French-Bulgarian art researcher Andréi Nakov was able to gain access to Bohomazov's studio, which, at the time, was in the hands of his widow. Impressed by the futurist work of the artist, he spoke about it on several occasions and published the first brief studies devoted to Bohomazov in 1973, 1977 and later in 1992 in Western European editorials. For the first time his works appeared outside Kyiv only in 1973, when several of them were included in the exhibition Tatlin’s Dream at Fischer Fine Art in London. Following the fall of the Berlin Wall, and Ukraine's independence, broader exhibition of his work became possible. In 1991 his paintings were exhibited at the Musée d’Art Moderne in Toulouse, whose director Alain Mousseigne not only shared Andréi Nakov's enthusiasm for Bohomazov but made every effort to present his works in museums. Encouraged by the successes obtained in France, the Ukrainian authorities took up the torch at this time and presented the same exhibition in Kyiv. Since that date, several publications have emerged in Ukraine while Bohomazov's works have entered Ukrainian and Western public collections, including MoMA & Guggenheim Museum in New York, Art Institute Chicago, Museum Ludwig in Cologne, James Butterwick Collection in London, Kröller-Müller Museum in Otterlo, Netherlands, NAMU in Kyiv and others.

In 2022 Bohomazov's works became part of the exhibition 'In the Eye of the Storm: Modernism in Ukraine 1900-1930', organised with the support of the Museo Nacional Thyssen-Bornemisza in Madrid with many works on loan from the National Art Museum of Ukraine and the State Museum of Theatre, Music and Cinema of Ukraine. His works, alongside the works of other representatives of Ukrainian avant-garde movement, Kazymyr Malevych, Oleksandra Ekster, Wladimir Baranoff-Rossiné, and Sonia Delaunay were carefully transported under active bombardment of Ukraine's territory due to Russian Invasion. After Madrid, moved to Museum Ludwig in Cologne, Germany in 2023 and Royal Academy of Arts in London, United Kingdom in 2024. Bohomazov's 'Landscape' is on the cover of the art edition in support of the exhibition.

== Representative works ==
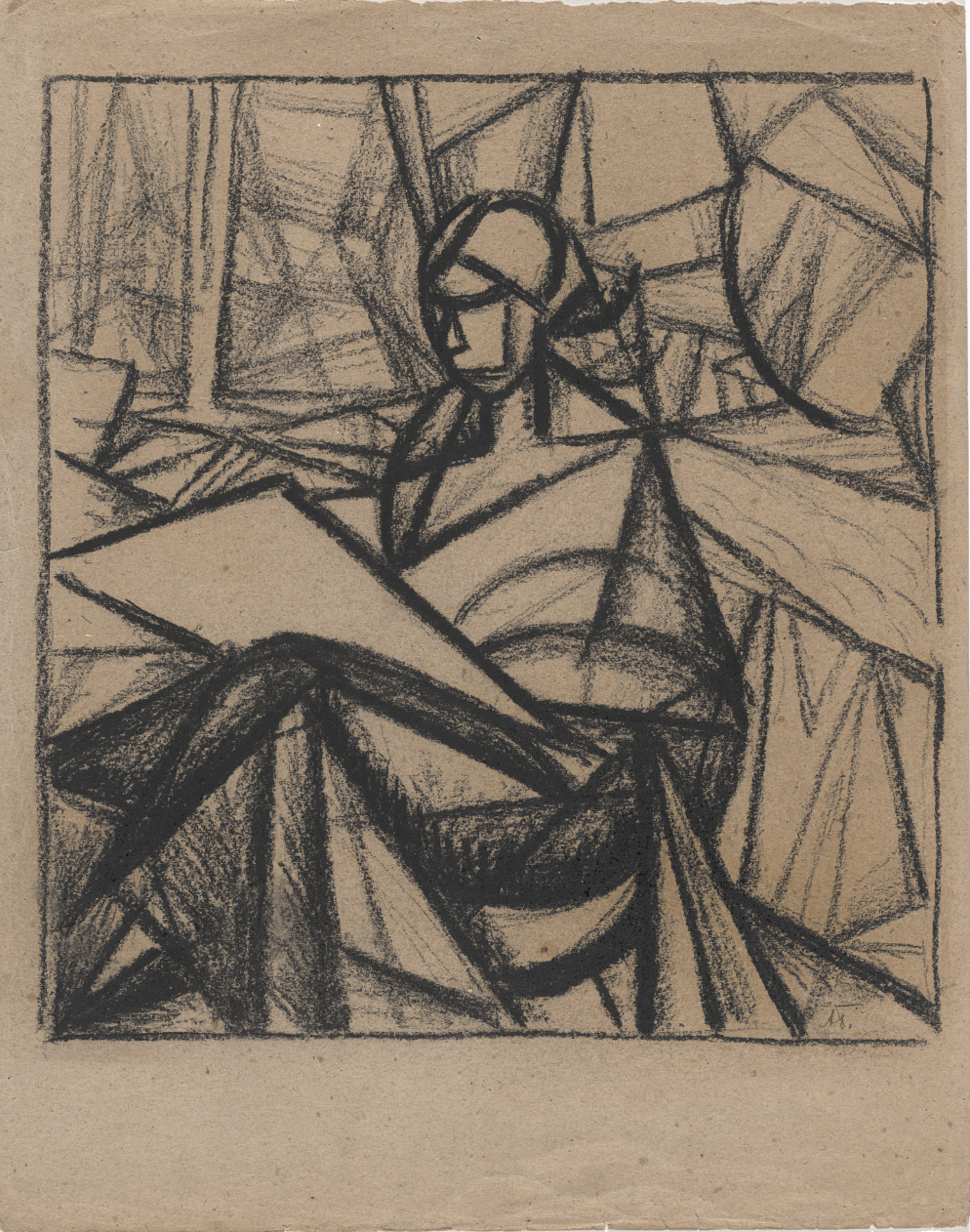
Woman, 1914. Charcoal on paper, MoMA, New York

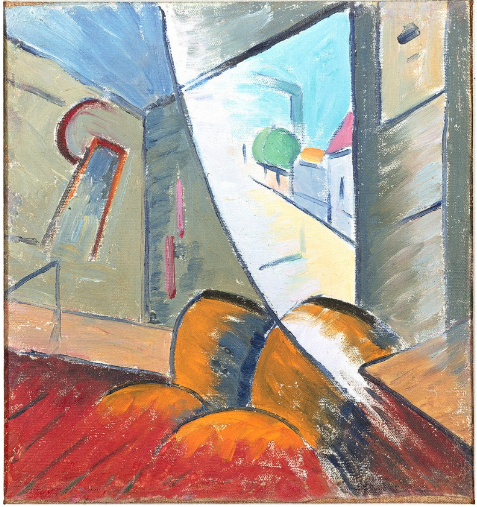
'Cityscape', 1913–14, Museum Ludwig, Cologne

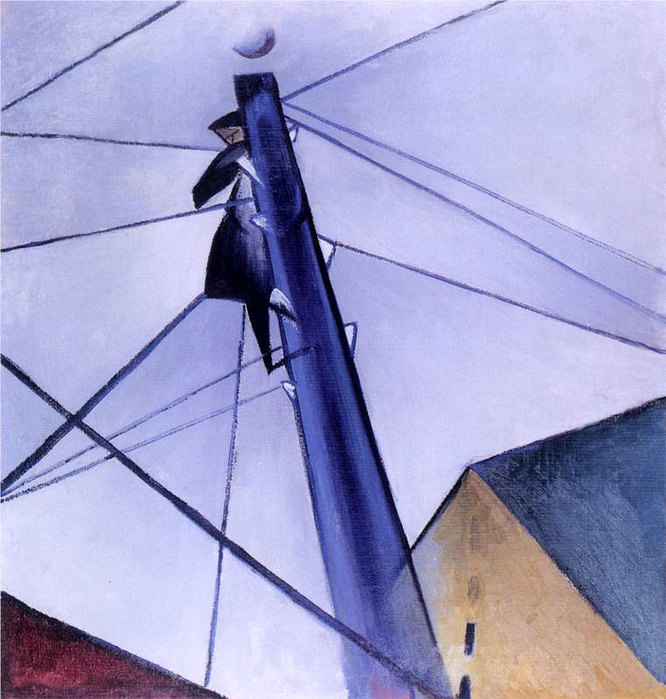
Mounter, 1914

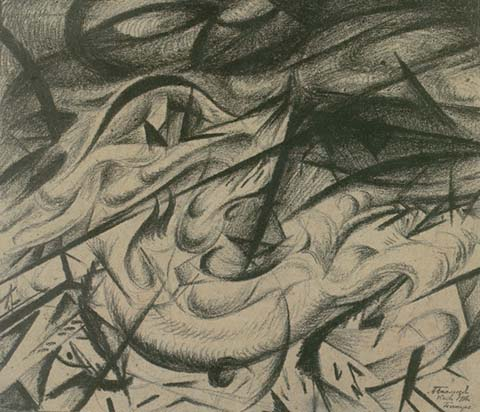
"Fire in Kyiv." 1916. Paper, charcoal. 27х32 sm. National Art Museum of Ukraine (NAMU), Kyiv

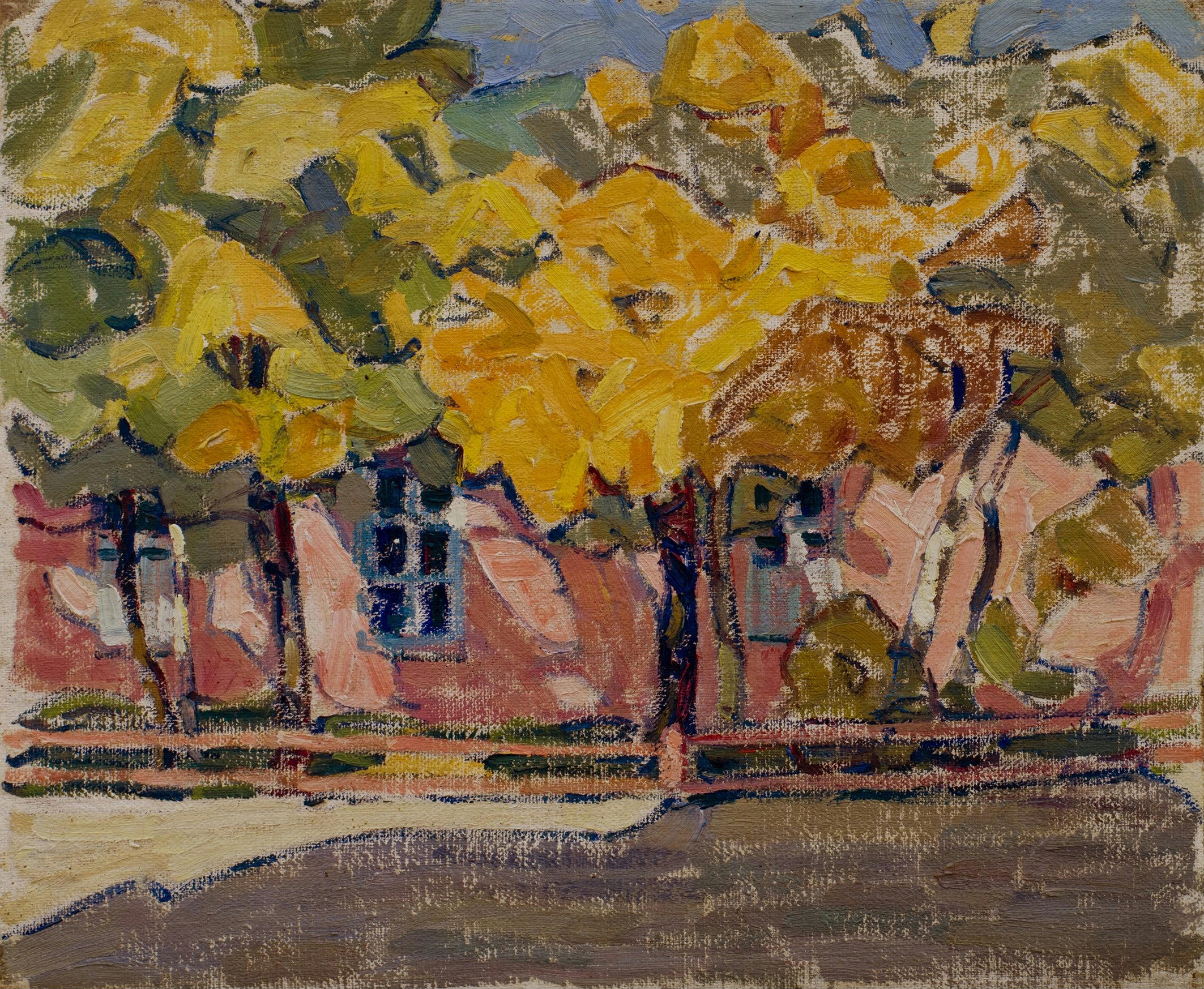
Street on Podil. 1912. Canvas, oil

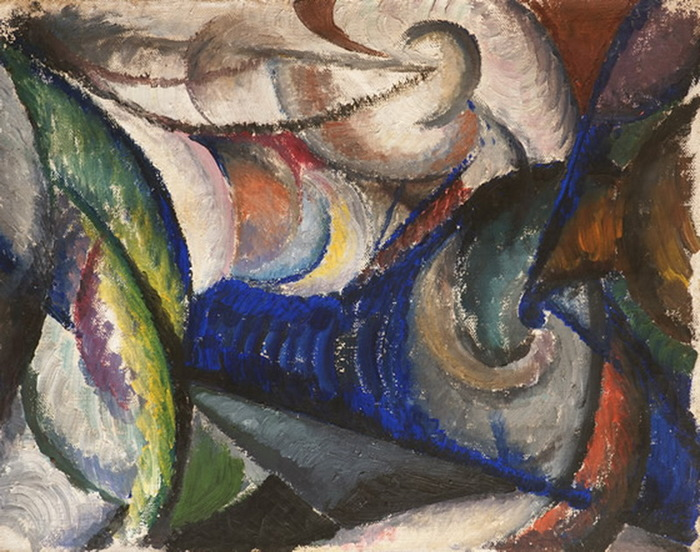
Train in Boyarka, 1914

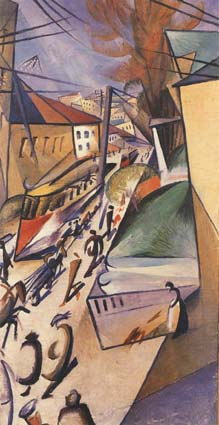
"Tram." 1914. Canvas, oil. appr. 150х80 sm. Private collection

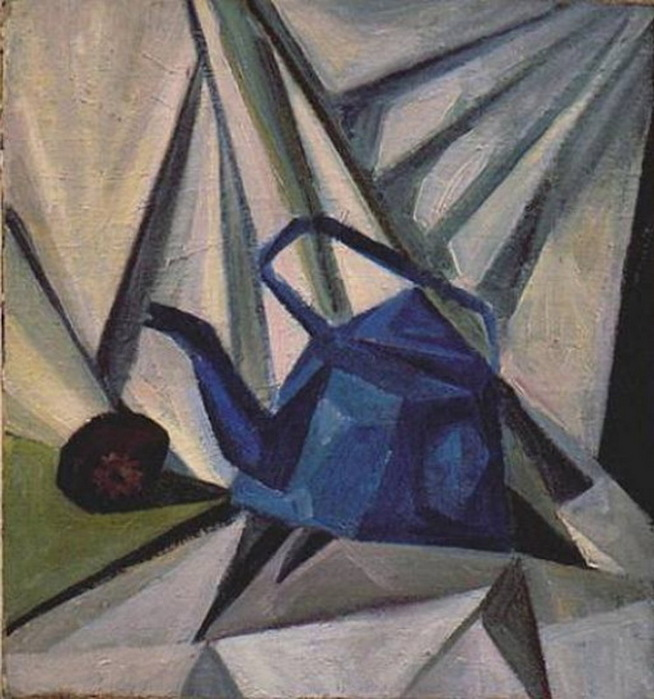
Tea Kettle, 1914

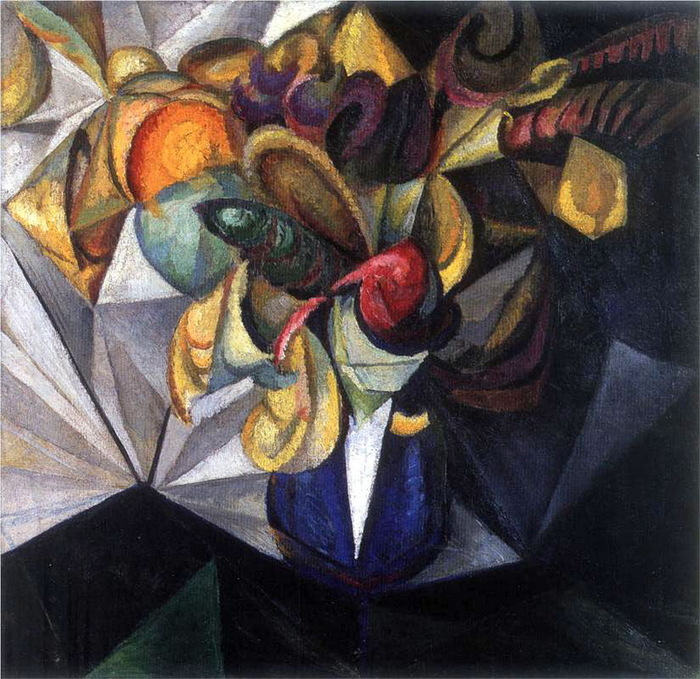
Flowers, 1914

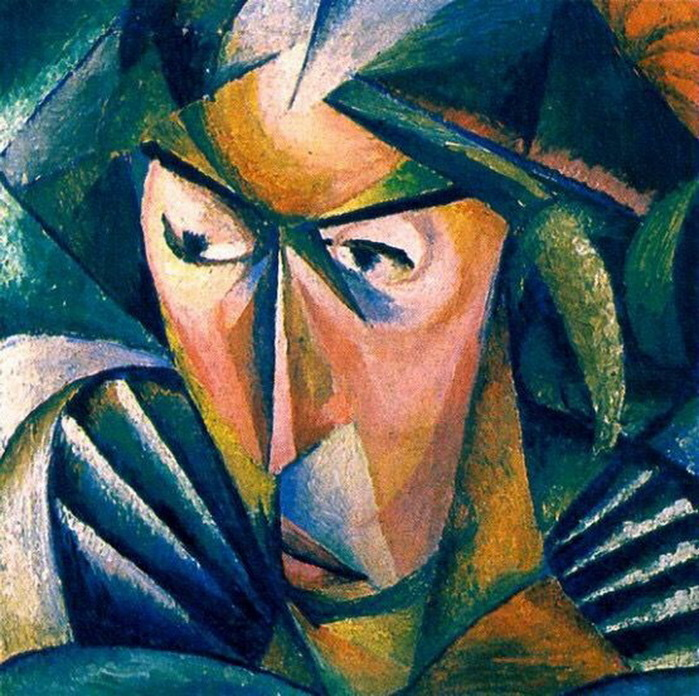
Portrait of Wife, 1914

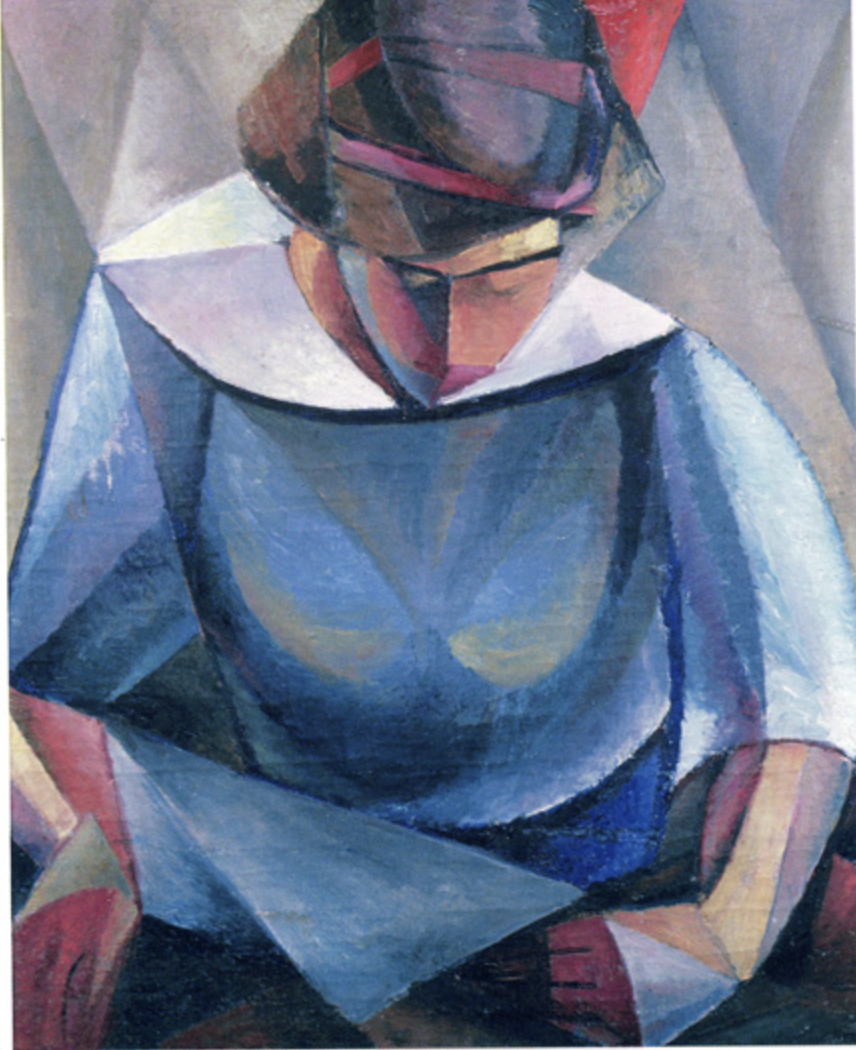
Portrait of Wife, Reading. 1914. Oil on canvas, 71x58

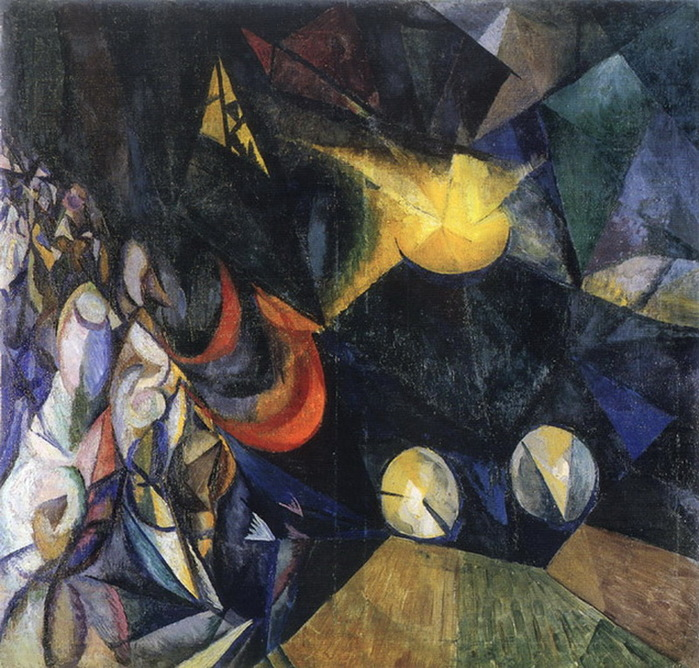
'Train', 1915, Canvas, oil

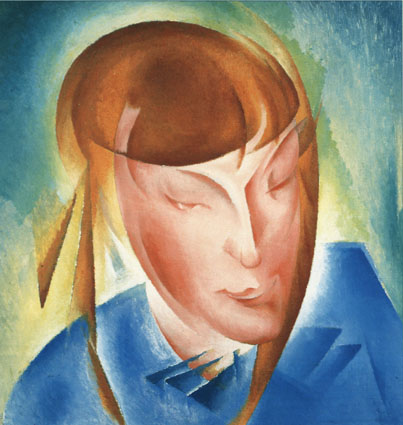
Portrait of the Daughter. 1928. Canvas, oil

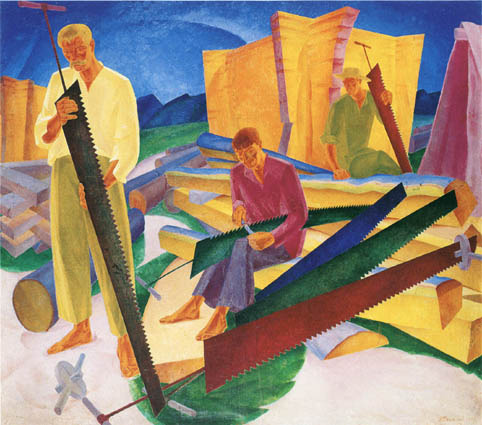
"Stropping the saws." 1927. Canvas, oil

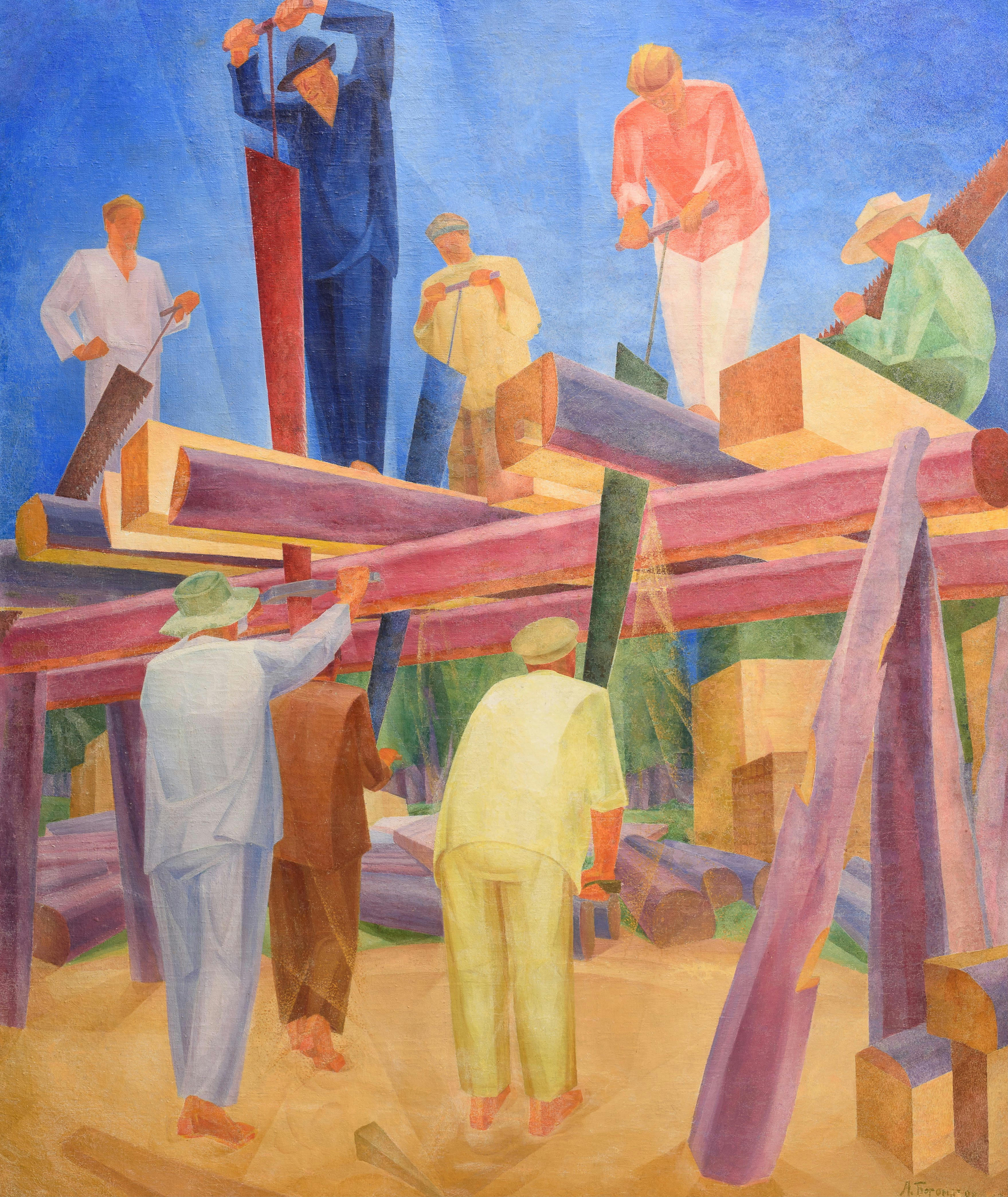
Sawyers. 1929. Canvas, oil

== Literature ==
- A.Bohomazov. Painting and Elements. Comp.T.Popova. (Parallel text in Ukrainian and English.) Kyiv. 1996. – 152 p. ISBN 996-532-001-7, LCCN 2003-481219
- Oleksandr Bohomazov, 1880–1930 : kataloh tvoriv (Catalogue of works, Ukraine/English). Kyiv: Harant, 1991. LCCN 2003-500490
- Mudrak, Myroslava M. “The Painted Surface in the Ukrainian Avant-garde: from Facture to Construction.” Pantheon 45 (1987): 138–43.
- Nakov, Andrei. “De l’expression futuriste au formalisme construit,” 13–24, in Alexandre Bogomazov, Jampol, 1880 – Kyiv, 1930 . Musee d’Art Moderne, Refectoire des Jacobins, Toulouse . N.p.: Editions Arpap, 1991.
- Exhibition Avangarde & Ukraine. 6 May – 11 July 1993. Villa Stuck Munich, Germany. Catalogue, 200p: ISBN 3-7814-0346-7
- Exhibition L'art en Ukraine. 28 October 1993 – 17 January 1994. Musée des Augustins de Toulouse, France. Catalogue (160 p): ISBN 2-901820-07-7
- John E.Bowlt. N.D.Lobanov-Rostovsky. Katalog-rezone Khudozhniki Russkogo Teatra / Catalogue-raisonne Painters of Russian theatre. 1880–1930. Collection of Nikita and Nina Lobanov-Rostovsky. In Russian, 156 colour and 1026 b/w illustrations. 1994. – 528 p. ISBN 5-210-00233-0
- The phenomenon of the Ukrainian avant-garde, 1910-1935 / Phénomène de l’avant-garde ukrainienne, 1910–1935. Edited by Myroslav Shkandrij. (Parallel text in English, Ukrainian and French.) 196 p. Winnipeg, Man. : Winnipeg Art Gallery, 2001. ISBN 978-0-88915-208-3
- Kyiv to Paris: Ukrainian Art in the European Avant-Garde, 1905–1930. By Prof. Myroslav Shkandrij, Department of German and Slavic Studies University of Manitoba, Winnipeg, Canada
