= Georges Papazoff =

Bulgarian artist and writer (1894–1972)

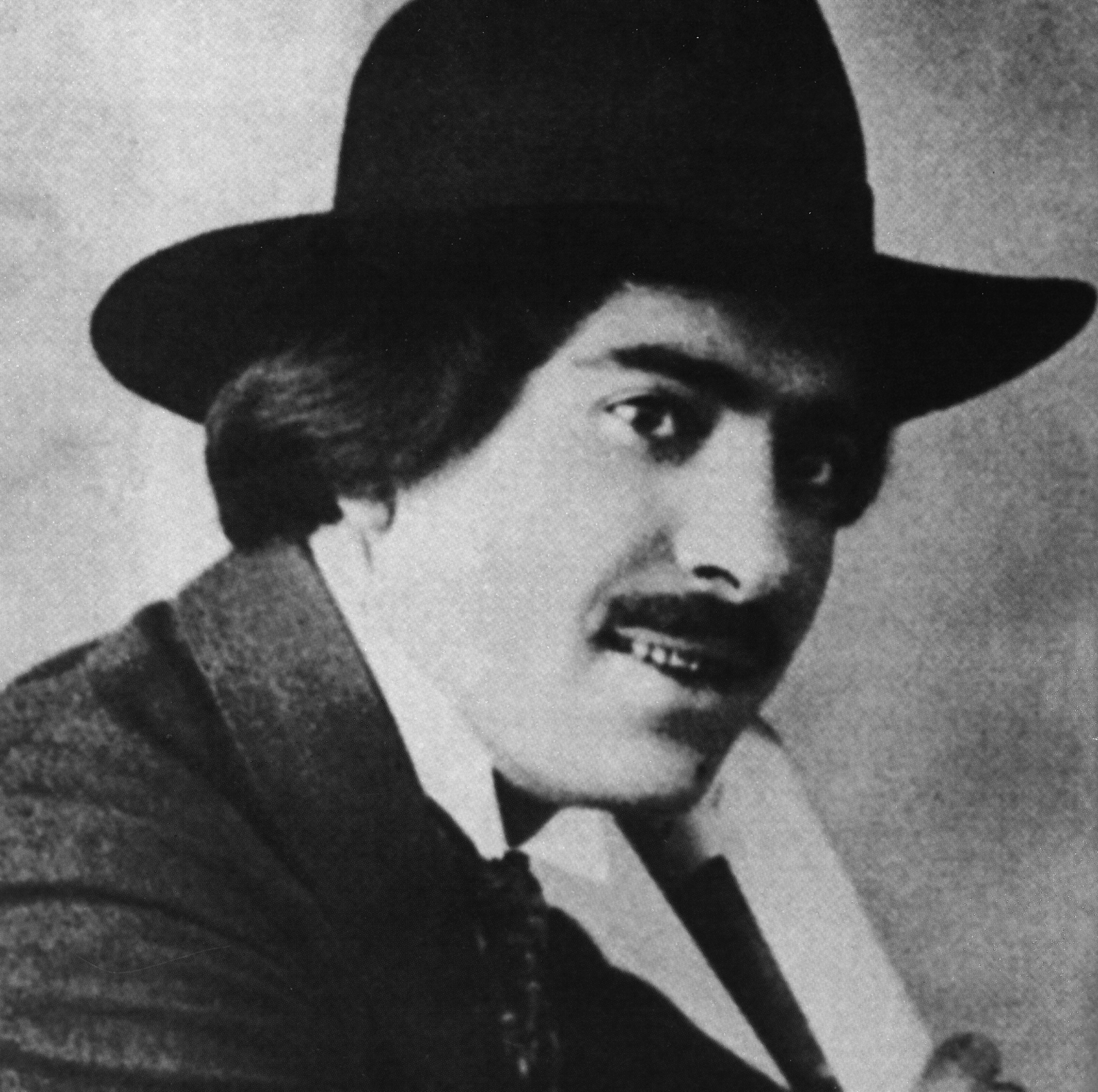
- Born: 2 February 1894; Yambol, Bulgaria
- Died: 23 April 1972 (aged 78); Vence, France

Signature
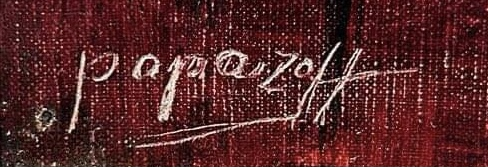

Georges Papazoff (Papasoff, Georges) (Bulgarian: Георги Папазов) (2 February 1894, in Yambol – 23 April 1972, in Vence, Alpes-Maritimes) was a Bulgarian painter and writer. He became prominent in Paris, worked and died in France. He was among the first surrealists, and was an acquaintance of Joan Miró, Max Ernst and Pablo Picasso.

== Early years ==
Georges Papazoff was born in Yambol, Bulgaria and after volunteering in the Balkan War, he left for Prague in 1913. In his autobiography, he mentions the school he attended as Grand Ecole. Papazoff enrolled in it to study architecture and park design. He was drawing plant species and buildings, watercolour sketches of imaginary gardens. After the death of his first love he decided to move to Munich. Papazoff attended the school of Hans Hofmann. In his autobiography, Papazoff shares: "In Germany, I settled in Munich, where the conditions for drawing were good. I enrolled at a private academy where I would draw live models in the evening. In 1921, Papazoff was already in Berlin, city that attracted artists, writers, actors, musicians, cabaret performers, etc. who filled the local galleries, theatres, music halls and operas.

Papazoff was probably influenced by the only German artist he mentions having a friendly relationship with - Hans Reichel. Papazoff admits that he didn't maintain close ties with artists except for Reichel. The German painter played an important role in Papazoff's life as someone who saw his works and encouraged him as an artist. Another important breakthrough for Papazoff was 1923 admission of one of his paintings by the Grosse Berliner Kunstausstellung. This is Pferde (Horses) with its author being spelled as Georg Papasoff. From the precise catalogue we can see that Papazoff was ranked in the same hall with some of the most avant-garde artists, e.g. Max Burkhartz, Erich Buchholz, Max Dungert, Ivan Puni, Willi Baumeister, Herbert Behrens-Hangeler, Karl Peter Röhl, Arthur Segal, Max Hermann Maxy, etc. Berlin's atmosphere of that time greatly influenced Papazoff's development as well as his personal choices. According to his memoirs, Horses was purchased by a collector.

In this early period the artist came under various influences. He painted realistic landscapes, usually depicting houses in Bohemia, and tried out impressionistic techniques in some of them (1916–18). One can see how from a classic treatment of form and colour Papazoff transcended to colour lightening and harmonization of the elements in a painting. He created sketches of heads, ranging from expressionist to cubist methods. He also drew figure compositions, most often genre scenes from everyday life, applying the typical dynamic compositional principles of the German aesthetics of that period, including the grotesque. He displayed some of these works in his first Sofia exhibition in 1919, and critics immediately noted his immaturity.

After 1920, Papazoff's works were influenced by expressionism and cubism. The few surviving paintings of that time deployed a variety of styles. There were some more direct influences of expressionism stamped as a formula on portraits and figure compositions, but also some imaginative canvases reminiscent of the fairy tale and romantic subjects. Papazoff's interests were encouraged by the raft of contemporary trends – and specifically by Paul Klee. Papazoff deliberately veered away from real-life models and began experimenting with abstract images. His path also passed through his admiration for Van Gogh, from whom he borrowed the expressiveness of the brushstrokes.

At this stage, Papazoff's own style was still not fully formed. His evolution and passage through different methods was typical of many other avant-garde artists. Having spent several months in Geneva in 1923, drawn to the art of the Hodler and his acquaintance with Paul Klee, on 1 January 1924, Georges Papazoff was already in Paris.

== Shaping of style ==
In Paris, Papazoff received assistance from another Bulgarian - Jules Pascin. Pascin introduced him to the artistic community, showing him around the world of artists. Papazoff works were referred the surrealist movement, but he rarely ended up in an exhibitions or encyclopaedias featuring the surrealist artists. Papazoff claimed to be among the first to engage in surreal imagery, yet he got credit for this from only a few: "But finally I learned that when I refuse to accept the rules of the surrealists, I condemn myself. To date, no surrealist wants to remember or admit that I was the first one who showed some a-real, or, if you want, "surreal," paintings in Paris." Papazoff was not a member of the surrealist group, but he created works in their spirit and exhibited with them. The 1927 Anthology of French Painting by Maurice Raynal classifies Georges Papazoff's work from as surreal imagery and gives him a place, linking it to the German tradition, as well as to Klee and Miró. Papazoff's style at this time was going through the influences of impressionism, expressionism, fauvism and cubism, while touching on realism and abstraction. In Antologie plastique du surréalisme, Jacques Baron gives Papazoff a significant place, calling him a free spirit who wasn't affiliated with any groups. Baron draws reader's attention to Papazoff's relationships with Tristan Tzara, Robert Desnos, Paul Éluard and Max Ernst. Papazoff's name is also mentioned in the 1982 Dictionary of Surrealism, in which the entry on Papazoff was written by Édouard Jaguer: "Papazoff is undoubtedly one of the forerunners of what we now call 'abstract surrealism' of the mid-1920s, along with Miró, Ernst, Malkin and Masson." In his 1975 Encyclopaedia of Surrealism, René Passeron mentions that upon his arrival in Paris, Papazoff recognized the surrealists with whom he exhibited as his own ilk, but his independent character stood in the way of his integration into the group. Jean-Pierre Delarge identifies Papazoff as a surrealist, a cubist, a fauvist, a follower of Klee, applying frottage like Ernst, painting figures on a pure background like Léger, and having Slavic reminiscences like Chagall. Andréi Nakov draws attention to both the sources of Papazoff's inspiration - German expressionism and Klee, and his relationship with the French surrealists and Miró. Jean-Paul Crespelle pays special attention to Papazoff in "Uncle Papazoff – the Bulgarian who told stories of love and blood,". He describes him as an artist "who became surrealist before surrealism". "His bright, original painting, sparkling with cheerful humour, heralded the searches of Miró and Max Ernst. Surrealists claim that Papazoff belonged to their movement."

The Bulgarians authors who studied Papazoff, like Krastev and Nakov, being also familiar with the local folk tradition, have mentioned that the latter is where some of the artist's inspirations have come from. This refers to his colour solutions and to his leveraging of some decorative elements, which is especially evident in The Apron, 1927; Fire, 1925/26; or Composition, ca. 1925. It can also be seen in The Bulgarian Strength, 1928, an abstract composition exhibiting a stylized hand in its centre holding the already familiar floodlight cone. Some elements, e.g. the colour scheme, the shapes that resemble mountain silhouettes, correspond well to the title.

Over the years, Papazoff developed his own pool of trademark elements that he frequently resorted to, e.g. stylized dogs, fish, cones, stairs, etc. A recurring motif is that of the moon, sometimes split into two parts, reflecting the sea and the sky. The stairs appear in drawings and paintings, as symbolic stairways to heaven. The constant presence of the sea, as a symbol of freedom and mystery, also marks the artist's interest in the unexplored territories of living and consciousness.

== The role of Katherine Dreier ==
In 1920 Katherine Dreier known for being a patron of the arts and aspired to perform as an educator. She cofounded the Société Anonyme with Marcel Duchamp and Man Ray. She began working on a major international exhibition to show at the Brooklyn Museum between 1926 and 1927, where Georges Papazoff also participated. Referring to the involvement of Papazoff, Ruth Bohan wrote: “Surrealism made its American debut in the Brooklyn exhibition. Hans Arp, Max Ernst, Joan Miró and the little-known Bulgarian artist, Georges Papazoff, demonstrated the biomorphic and abstract phases of the Surrealist movement.”

Papazoff presented a total of six works. These were the oil canvases Blue Mist, 106 x 94 сm and The Idol, 60 x 74 сm; and the watercolours Untitled (Landscape with Cows), Untitled (Blue Landscape), Untitled (Funeral Procession), and Untitled (Four Fishermen), all dated 1924-26 and measuring 12 х 15 сm. The biographical note about Papazoff was written by Dreier: “Born in Bulgaria among the mountain peasants, whose life he expresses with rare enchantment. His sensitiveness to nature and to the atmospheric aspects of his country he renders through a very individual form. He studied to be an architect, but has devoted himself more to painting since coming to Paris.”. The page was illustrated by three of his works: The Funeral, Springtime and Children at Play (all three not part of the exhibition).

On 11 October 1941, the private collection of Katherine Dreier was donated to the Yale University Art Gallery which also includes 6 of Papazov's works. https://artgallery.yale.edu/collection?query=Georges+Papazoff

== Henri-Pierre Roché, Rolf de Maré and Oscar Ghez ==
Henri-Pierre Roche, French writer and close friend to some of the most significant figures in the arts during the XX century. He collected mostly works by foreigners. He selected a few drawings from Papazoff - watercolours, and a canvas. He also commissioned 25 etchings with Papazoff. At his invitation Papazoff spent several weeks in his house in Saint-Robert en Correze. In 1931, Roché initiated an exhibition of 48 canvases by Papazoff at the Parisian Renaissance Gallery. Over the coming years, Roché continued to promote Papazoff's art. In January 1934, he exhibited 23 paintings of his at the Arts Club de Chicago. Henri-Pierre Roche used all his American connections to achieve maximum effect in presenting Papazov's art. 1937 saw him laying out a Papazoff exhibition at the Jeanne Castel Gallery, while in 1950 he put up another one at Paris’ Renou & Poyet Gallery.

Rolf de Mare was a collector and patron, founder of the Swedish Ballet in Paris. Within a very short period, de Maré managed to amass an incredible collection. Thanks to Georges Papazoff's friendship with him, the artist had a few organized exhibitions in Stockholm. The Museum of Modern Art in Stockholm owns 36 works by Papazov - 16 paintings, 19 graphics and one drawing. Two of these paintings, Personages magiques, 1933 and Impression d’une cathédrale, 1933, were purchased by the National Museum in 1953 from George Papazoff's solo exhibition in Stockholm. The others are donated by Rolfe de Mare.

Oscar Ghez is another collector and patron of Papazoff. He founded Le Petit Palais Museum where from 5 June to 30 June 1974, was hosted an exhibition of Papazoff's oeuvre entitled “Georges Papazoff (1894-1972). Works from 1920 to 1935.”. In 1995, Le Petit Palais hosted another exhibition titled, “Georges Papazoff (1894-1972). A pioneer of surrealism.”. In May–June 1988, an exhibition of works by Georges Papazoff at the National Gallery in Sofia was laid out with works borrowed from Le Petit Palais, comprising 74 oil paintings, 2 gouaches and 6 frottage drawings. The result of the initiative and efforts of Oscar Ghez and the Petit Palais Museum was the publication of the monograph with text by Gaston Diehl in 1995. Works from the collection are also included in the large retrospective "Georges Papazoff - The Illuminator" at the National Gallery, Sofia, 2022–2023.

== Exhibitions in Sofia, Zagreb and Prague ==
Papazoff launched his first solo exhibition in September 1919, at Sofia's Trapkov Gallery. In the 1930s, Papazoff returned over again to Bulgaria – now as a mature and successful artist. In 1934, he presented 94 paintings at the Koop Gallery. The following year he put up some new works in the Gallery of the Six . Papazoff also participated in the IX Common Art Exhibition as a guest of the New Artists group. His work aroused extensive controversy in the press.

From 17 December 1934, to 4 January 1935, Papazoff held a solo exhibition at the Modern Gallery in Zagreb, It featured 57 works created from the period of 1929–1934. A catalogue with a list of works, two reproductions, and a foreword by Ivo Šrepl was published, qualifying Papazoff as one of the most well-known idealist painters: “By organizing Georgi Papazoff’s exhibition in Zagreb, the Croatian Art Society makes available to the public one of the brightest representatives of the generation of idealist painters in Western Europe who, after fauvism, has blazed entirely new paths for artists. Papazoff’s strong individuality further develops and changes the cubism of Picasso, Braque, Delaunay, Gris and Léger, the purism of Ozenfant and Jeanneret, the Dadaism of Picabia and Duchamp, as well as the surrealism of Miró, Klee and Hoerle.”

In 1935, Papazoff returned to Prague with a solo exhibition at the Feigl Gallery. The catalogue shows 52 works created in the period 1928–1934.

== Exhibitions after Papazoff’s death ==
After his death in 1972, various exhibitions were launched in his memory. Two large ones opened in Sofia in 1982 and 1988; the former showed Papazoff's works from private collections, while the latter borrowed 76 paintings and 6 drawings from the Petit Palais Museum in Geneva. Dr. Maria Vassileva curates a large-scale exhibition at the National Gallery-Palace, Sofia 16.12.2022 – 19.03.2023 entitled "Georges Papazoff - The Illuminator" with works from: the private collection of Gueorgui Vassilev, the Petit Palais Museum, Geneva, the National Gallery, Sofia, National Museum of Modern Art, Zagreb, Georges Papazoff Art Gallery Yambol.

== Literature about Papazoff ==
Maria Vassileva is the author of a monograph (in Bulgarian, French and English), which includes unknown works and facts about the work of Georges Papazoff. The study places the artist in the context of the most current trends in art world of the first half of the 20th century and traces his active participation in them, as well as the role he played in their confirmation. The National Gallery publishes a catalog (in Bulgarian and English) of works by Georges Papazoff from its collection. On the occasion of the exhibition, the autobiography "Жорж Папазов. По стъпките на художника" (with the original title: "Sur les pas du peintre. Suivi de documents et témoignages", Galerie de Seine, Paris, 1971).

- Kiril Krastev - George Papazov, 1973
- Andrei Nakoff - Georges Pappasoff, Franc-tireur du Surrealisme, 1973
- Gaston Diehl - Papazoff, 1998

== Solo Exhibitions ==
- 1919 - First Papazoff’s solo exhibition with sixty drawings and watercolors at Trapkov Gallery, Sofia
- 1926 - Drawings, Vavin-Raspail Gallery (1-15 May), Paris
- 1927 - Drawings, Vavin-Raspail Gallery (3-15 June), Paris
- 1927 - Paintings, Vavin-Raspail Gallery (3-15 November). Catalogue with introduction by Waldemar-Georges, Paris
- 1928 - Drawings and paintings at the Jeanne Bucher Gallery (17 December 1928-1 January 1929), Paris. Tristan Tsara’s poem Moment Remark Brother prefaced the catalogue Papazoff donated eight canvases to Sofia’s Gallery of the Six (2 Targovska Street) for charity in favor of the victims of the Chirpan earthquake. Initiated by the Parisian Vavin-Raspail Gallery in May.
- 1930 - Eighty paintings at the Renaissance Gallery and engravings in the Jean Boucher Gallery, June, Paris
- 1933 - Galerie Moderne, sixty-nine paintings (16-28 September). Catalogue with foreword by Rolf de Maré, Ragnar Hoppe and Robert Desnos, Stockhol
- 1934 - Eighty-two oil paintings from 1929–1933 at the Galleria del Milione (21 Via Brera, 20 February-6 March), Milan. Catalogue; Exhibition at the Renaissance Gallery, Paris Twenty-three paintings at the Art Club (19 January-8 February), Chicago. The same exhibition opened 5 March at the Marie Harrimann Gallery in New York (61-63, East 57th Street). Catalogue; Изложба слика Папазов, „Cvijeta Zuzorić“ Art Pavilion (Уметнички павиљон "Цвијета Зузорић"), Belgrade (30 September-12 October 1934. Catalogue; Fifty-seven paintings in the Modern Gallery (17 December-14 January 1935), Zagreb. Catalogue; Ninety-four paintings from 1929–1933, KOOP Gallery (April 15-May 6), Sofia. Catalogue
- 1935 - Fifty-two paintings at Galerie Feigl. March–April, Prague; Exhibition at Gallery of the Six, until 31 May, 21 Targovska St. Sofia Exhibition at KOOP Gallery (6-28 October), Sofia. Catalogue
- 1936 - Ten canvases at the Miami Beach Public Library (August–November)
- 1937 - Paintings from the period 1932–1937 at Galerie Jeanne Castel, (18 June-2 July), Paris
- 1950 - Retrospective exhibition. Moderna Galleriet, Stockholm; Thirty-three paintings from 1923–1950 (16 June-5 July). Catalogue with foreword by Henri-Pierre Roché and Marcel Sauvage
- 1952 - Saint-Benoît Gallery, Paris (26 May- 7 June)
- 1953 - Moderna Galleriet, Stockholm (October)
- 1955 - Paintings from 1939–1955 at Galerie Pétridès, Paris. Catalogue foreworded by Rolf de Maré, Henri-Pierre Roché, Pascal Pia, etc.
- 1961 - Galerie de Paris. Catalogue foreworded by Marcel Aymé and Robert Desnos
- 1969 - Twenty pastels from 1925 at Galerie Françoise Tournié
- 1971 - Papazoff retrospective exhibition. Galerie De Seine, 20 October-10 November
- 1972 - Papazoff 1894–1972, Acoris – the Surrealist Art Centre, 31 Brook Street, London
- 1973 - Hommage a Papazoff, Galerie Françoise Tournié, 25 January-25 February
- 1974 - Retrospective exhibition. Galleria Annunciata, Milan; Retrospective Georges Papazoff (1894–1972). Oevre de 1920 à 1935, Petit Palais, Gèneve, 6–30 June
- 1975 - Papazoff. Ouvres de 1923 à 1932, 7–31 January, Galerie de Seine, 18, rue de Seine, Paris
- 1976 - Papazoff. Peintures 1918–1936, 29 January-5 April 1976, Maison de la Culture et des Loisirs de Saint-Etienne Maurice Henry, Jacques Herold, Mayo, Georges Papazoff. Quattro Maestri del Surrealismo, open 3 April 1976, Galleria Annunciata, Milan
- 1978 - Papazoff. Galerie Françoise Tournié, 10, rue de Roi de Sicile, open 8 June
- 1982 - Papazoff’s works in Bulgarian collections, 6 Shipka Street Gallery, Sofia and Georges Papazoff Art Gallery, Yambol Homage à Papazoff; Peintures, Galerie Alphonse Chave, Vence, 3 April-4 June
- 1988 - Georges Papazoff 1894–1972. Works from the collection of the Petit Palais Museum, Geneva, May–June 1988, opening May 13, 1988, National Gallery for Foreign Art, Sofia
- 1992-1993 - Georges Papazoff, précurseur et franc-tireur du Surréalisme, Petit Palais, Geneva
- 1995 - Georges Papazoff (1894–1972). Pionnier du Surréalisme, 26 January-2 April, Petit Palais, Geneva
- 2002 - Abstract projections – in Georges Papazoff’s footsteps, Georges Papazoff Art Gallery, Yambol Georges Papazoff. Un éclaireur surréaliste (ouvres de 1925 a 1939), Galerie A. L. (Anne Lacombe), 3, rue de Verneuil, 23 May-29 June
- 2004 - Georges Papazoff. National Gallery for Foreign Art, Sofia, April (35 etchings and one pastel) Papazoff (oevre de 1924 à 1962), 7–30 November, galerie Les Yeux Fertiles, 27, rue de Seine, Paris
- 2012 - Georges Papazoff (1894–1972), Galerie Antoine Laurentin, Paris
- 2015 - Georges Papazoff (1894–1972), Galerie Antoine Laurentin, 23, quai Voltaire, Paris
- 2016 - Georges Papazoff and Nikolai Dyulgerov. Visions of Free Spirit, Rakursi Gallery, 4a Khan Krum St., Sofia, November 10–25
- 2018 - Georges Papazoff (1894–1972). A Collection of emblematic works, Forum Gallery, Sofia, 12 November-12 December 2018
- 2022 - GEORGES PAPAZOFF – THE ILLUMINATOR. Curator: Dr. Maria Vassileva, 16/12/2022 - 19/03/2023, National Gallery - The Palace, Sofia. Works from the National Gallery, Art Gallery "Georges Papazoff", Yambol, Bulgaria, Petit Palais, Geneva, Switzerland, Gueorgui Vassileva Collection.
- 2024 - „ЖОРЖ ПАПАЗОВ, КОГОТО (НЕ) ПОЗНАВАМЕ“, 24 октомври – 10 декември 2024, ХГ "Жорж Папазов", Ямбол, България. 34 творби от фондовете на Националната художествена галерия, на сливенската галерия „Димитър Добрович“ и на ямболската галерия „Жорж Папазов“. Подредени са и непоказвани до момента рисунки на Жорж Папазов от 20-те години на миналия век, които са от частната колекция на Георги Василев. Слово на откриването: Мария Василева
- 2025 - Georges Papazoff. From the Gueorgui Vassilev Collection - 90 Years Later. Curated by Maria Vassileva. May 6 – June 1. Josip Racic Gallery. National Museum of Modern Art, Zagreb. 15 works, catalog
- Georges Papazoff. Retrouver son chez-soi, Institut culturel bulgare, Paris, 30 octobre - 5 décembre 2025, 22 toiles originales. Commissaire de l’exposition - Dr Maria Vassileva. Tous les tableaux proviennent de la collection privée de Geourgui Vassilev
- From Yambol to the Icy Continent: An Odyssey of the Spirit. An Exhibition of Georges Papazoff (1894–1972) with 11 drawings from Gueorgui Vassilev Collection at the Bulgarian Antarctic Base on Livingston Island. 27–30 December 2025. Curated by Maria Vassileva.
- Жорж Папазов и Стокхолм / Georges Papazoff and Stockholm, 14.4-2.5.2026, Union of Bulgarian Artists, Shipka 6 Street, catalogue. With works by Georges Papazoff, Nils Dardel and Henry Unger. Curated by Maria Vassileva.

== Recent group exhibitions ==
- 2025 - FRENCH CONNECTIONS: Liuba Boyadjieva – LIUBA, Jules Pascin, Georges Papazoff. From the collection of Gueorgui Vassilev, curated by Maria Vassileva. Dechko Uzunov House Museum, Art Gallery Kazanlak, Bulgaria. In the frames of the project RESURFACING, 18 October 2025 – 29 March 2026

== Writings ==
- Pascin! Pascin! C’est moi! (Paris, 1932)
- Paris – l'oeuvre et le destin des grands peintres (Paris, 1936). In several issues of La Parole Bulgare Papazoff, Georges. Paris – creativity and destiny of great artists, Sofia: Zaveti, 1938. With a foreword by Nikola Balabanov
- Drenov frères. (Paris, 1951)
- Derain, mon copain (Paris, 1960)
- Lettres a Derain (Paris, 1966) - https://www.academia.edu/168965373/Жорж_Папазов_Писма_до_Дерен
- Pope Vassil. (Paris, 1968)
- Georges Papazoff. Sur les pas du peintre. Suivi de documents et témoignages. (Paris, 1971)
- Жорж Папазов. По стъпките на художника, 1971. Преводач: Станимир Делчев. Издание по повод ретроспективната изложба на художника в Националната галерия, София, ноември-декември 2022. С любезното съдействие на г-н Георги Василев. Галерия Структура, София, 2022

== Lectures by Papazoff ==
- Art and reality and the influence of the Paris School on world painting, May 21, 1935, Alliance Française, Sofia, with the assistance of ARS (in French)
- Paris and its artists, May 23, 1935, Alliance Française, Sofia, with the support of ARS (in French)
- Schools and personalities in contemporary art, September 20, 1935, during the IX Common Art Exhibition, Sofia
- French artists from Delacroix to Cézanne and Pasquin, two talks in Sliven, February 1936

== Catalogues ==
- Papazoff. Il Milione, 20 febbraio-6 marzo 1934. Reviews: G. Papazoff, Waldemar George, Ragnar Hoppe (60 oil paintings and 50 etchings)
- Izložba Papazova. Moderna Galerija, Zagreb, 11 Dec. 1934 – 4 Jan. 1935 (57 works)
- Georgij Papazoff (Pariz) Olejomalby. Galerie Dra Feigla, Praha, March–April 1935 (52 works). Text: Georgij Papazoff
- Papazoff. Franc-tireur du surréalisme. Galleria Annunciata, Milano, 19 gennaio-5 febbraio 1974. Reviews: Jacques Baron. “Le Surréalisme et Georges Papazoff”, Maurice Raynal. Le surréalisme, 1927, Waldemar George, 1927, Robert Desnos, 1930, Oscar Kokoshka, 1935. Biography included
- Exhibition Papazoff. COOP Gallery, 6–28 October 1935, Sofia 1935. Reviews: Oskar Kokoschka, Vienna; Ryasko Petrovic, Belgrade; F.T. Marinetti, Rome; Rudolf Fuchs, Prague (45 works)
- Papazoff. Œuvres de 1925 à 1939, Galerie de Seine, Paris, Janvier 1975. Review: Philippe Soupault. Biography and bibliography included
- Papazoff. Peintures 1918–1936, Maison de la Culture et des Loisirs de Saint-Etienne, 29 janvier-5 avril 1976. Review: Philippe Soupault (62 works)
- Maurice Henry, Jacques Herold, Mayo, Georges Papazoff. Quatro maestri dei Surrealismo, Centro Annunciata, aprile 1976
- Important Ensemble de Gravures, Aquarelles et Peintures Provenant de l’Atelier de Georges Papazoff 1894–1972, Mes Loiseau et Schmitz, 2000
- Georges Papazoff. Un éclaireur surréaliste (œuvres de 1925 à 1939). Galerie A.L – Anne Lacombe, 23 Mai-28 Juin 2002, Review: Anne Lacombe. Biography included
- Schilders van Paris, 1870–1940 de verzameling Oscar Ghez, Terra Kunsthal Rotterdam, 2 oct 2004-25 jan 2005
- Georges Papazoff (1894–1972), Galerie Antoine Laurentin, Paris, 2012. Text: Papazoff: Surrealist and Anarchist or a Modern Eye, Sylvie Buisson. A selection of exhibitions included
- Yoneva, Rumyana. Nakov, Andrei. Georges Papazoff (1894–1972): From private collections in Bulgaria, catalog, Rakoursi gallery 2013
- ЖОРЖ ПАПАЗОВ – ОСВЕТИТЕЛЯТ GEORGES PAPAZOFF – THE ILLUMINATOR. София, 2023. Текстове от / texts by: Ярослава Бубнова

Iaroslava Boubnova, Мария Василева Maria Vassileva, Яна Братанова Yana Bratanova, National Gallery, Sofia 2023

- GEORGES PAPAZOFF. IZ ZBIRKE GUEORGUI VASSILEV. FROM THE GUEORGUI VASSILEV COLLECTION - 90 godina kasnije / 90 Years Later, 6. 5. – 1. 6. 2025. GALERIJA JOSIP RAČIĆ NACIONALNI MUZEJ MODERNE UMJETNOSTI / JOSIP RAČIĆ GALLERY NATIONAL MUSEUM OF MODERN ART, Margaretska 3, Zagreb. Text by Maria Vassileva

== Bibliography ==
- Crespelle, Jean Paul, Montparnasse vivant, Paris, 1962
- Krastev, Kiril, George Papazov, Sofia, 1973
- Nakoff, A., Georges Pappasoff, Franc-tireur du Surrealisme, Brussels, 1973
- Станчева, Румяна Л. Художникът Жорж Папазов като писател. Вербализация на сюрреалното. [Roumiana L. Stantcheva. The painter Georges Papazoff as a writer. Verbalization of surreal]. София: Колибри, 2014. http://www.colibri.bg/eng/books/1086/rumyana-l-stancheva-the-artist-georges-papazoff-as-a-writer
- Papazoff, Georges (1971). Sur les pas du peintre: suivi de documents et témoignages. Paris: Galerie de Seine.
- Vassileva, Maria (2021). Georges Papazoff. Sofia: Structura Gallery. ISBN 978-619-90949-7-6.
