= James Butterwick =

British art dealer

- Born: September 9, 1962 (age 63)
- Occupations: Art dealer, expert

James Butterwick (born 9 September 1962) is a British art dealer, collector, and expert in the field of Ukrainian and Russian art from 1880 to 1930.

== Biography ==
From an influential English family associated with the arts, Butterwick's grandfather, Cyril, a former classics master at Eton College, was a renowned English silver specialist and Director of Sotheby's with a collection of paintings, books and works of art. Butterwick's godfather, Peregrine Pollen, with whom he enjoyed a close relationship, was the President of Sotheby's in New York and also had a large collection. James' parents kept him interested in art and financed his first acquisition in 1985, a work on paper by Léon Bakst.

Between 1976 and 1980, Butterwick studied at Eton College, then at the Faculty of Arts, University of East Anglia, Norwich. Between 1982 and 1986 he studied Russian and History of Art at the University of Bristol, graduating with a 2.1 honours degree. It was whilst a student at the University of Bristol that he became interested in Russian literature and culture.

In 1985 Butterwick spent a six-month study internship in Minsk and Pyatigorsk, in the former USSR, after which he decided to concentrate exclusively on Russian Art. According to his recollections: "In 1985, I first went to the Soviet Union - to Minsk, went to the local museum and saw a lot of magnificent paintings by artists utterly unknown in the West. Then it occurred to me that, as no-one in the West knew of this art, it would make sense to, upon returning to Britain, get involved in Russian Art of the XIX - early XX century."

In 1994 he moved to Moscow. As he recalled: "Outside of Russia, there were few works of this period, so I moved to Moscow, I drove my car from London and worked in this market as a dealer. It was an incredibly interesting time and utterly crazy. Presidents of corporations and banks bought from me, I started to make a name for myself, lectured, made friends with old and new collectors and immersed myself in this new world. In the 1990s, Russia was a free country, possibly the freest in the world and, at least at that time, rather less hypocritical than Britain but the law in England is better respected, I had a great job offer and I chose to return there."

For three years Butterwick worked at Asprey in New Bond Street as Regional Director of the nascent Russian Department before returning to Russia in 1999 and setting up his art dealership anew. During the time 1994-2006 Butterwick formed the Sun Group collection, which was subsequently sold in 2008, post crisis, for an average return of 450% profit.

In 2010 Butterwick exhibited in Moscow for the first time, at the bi-annual art fair in TsDKh (ru:ЦДХ), an event he continued to attend until 2015. His exhibitions included award-winning shows of Ilya Chashnik, Oleksandr Bohomazov and others. In 2012, Butterwick put on the exhibition, ‘Russian Line’ in conjunction with Sotheby's, Moscow and consisting of works from his personal collection, Vrubel, Petrov-Vodkin, Grigoriev, Goncharova, Larionov, Chashnik, Konchalovsky and others. Other business ventures included an exhibition of Impressionists, Gaugain, Sisley, Renoir and others in Almaty, Kazakhstan in 2013.

In 2015 Butterwick was invited to exhibit at the TEFAF Maastricht Art Fair, the first gallery dealing in Russian Art to do so. He sold four works by Oleksandr Bohomazov to the Kröller-Müller Museum, Otterlo in the Netherlands and made further subsequent sales to this institution and the Art Center, Arkansas between 2016 and 2020. He also exhibited at TEFAF New York in 2016 and put on two ground-breaking exhibitions of the Ukrainian Cubo-Futurist Oleksandr Bohomazov.

Works from Butterwick's personal collection have taken part in several major museum exhibitions. In recent years, Butterwick has become a collector of Soviet nonconformist work of the second half of the 20th century and British watercolours of the 18th and 20th century and Old Master drawings.

A member of the Russian Society of Private Collectors since 1994, the International Confederation of Antiquaries and Art Dealers of the CIS and Russia since 2008 and the Society of London Art Dealers since 2013.

== Expertise ==
According to the editorial board of OpenSpace.ru (now Colta.ru), Butterwick is "one of the most authoritative experts on Russian art of the 1880s-1920s in the West".

In 2013, he accused the organisers of the exhibition "Avanguardie russe dal Cubofuturismo al Suprematismo", held in Mantua, of showing forgeries. The organisers subsequently sued him for libel and, in February 2020, an Italian court exonerated him and ruled that Butterwick's opinion was based on his “proven and recognized competence and experience,” which, “although harshly stated,” “was never offensive.

In 2018, he was among the leading experts on the Russian avant-garde who signed a letter about the dubious authenticity of works from the collection of Igor Toporovsky, exhibited in Ghent. As a result, the exhibition was closed down and became subject to a police investigation.

In July 2020, after his appeal, an auction in South Carolina of 49 works by Natalia Goncharova" was cancelled.
