= Atanas Hranov =

Bulgarian painter

Atanas Hranov Атанас Хранов
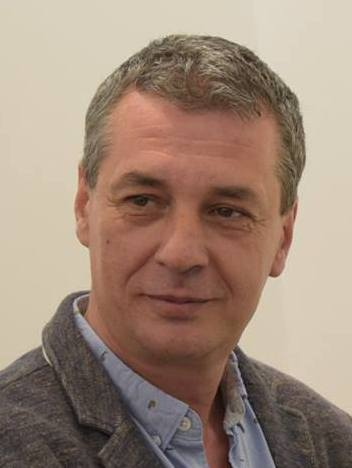
- Atanas Hranov (2017)
- Born: 11 October 1961 (age 64); Plovdiv, Bulgaria
- Known for: Painting, Sculpture

Atanas Hranov (Bulgarian: Атанас Хранов) is a Bulgarian painter and sculptor.

== Life and career ==
Atanas Hranov was born in Plovdiv on October 11, 1961. He studied at the National Arts School in Kotel (1980) and graduated from Prof. Anton Donchev's Woodcarving class at the National Academy of Art in Sofia in 1987.

Hranov's works range from sculpture to painting, often representing an organic fusion of genres. His preferred materials include wood, handmade paper, canvas, bronze, silver, and polymer coated metal structures. Hranov has held more than 60 solo exhibitions and taken part in numerous group initiatives and curatorial projects.

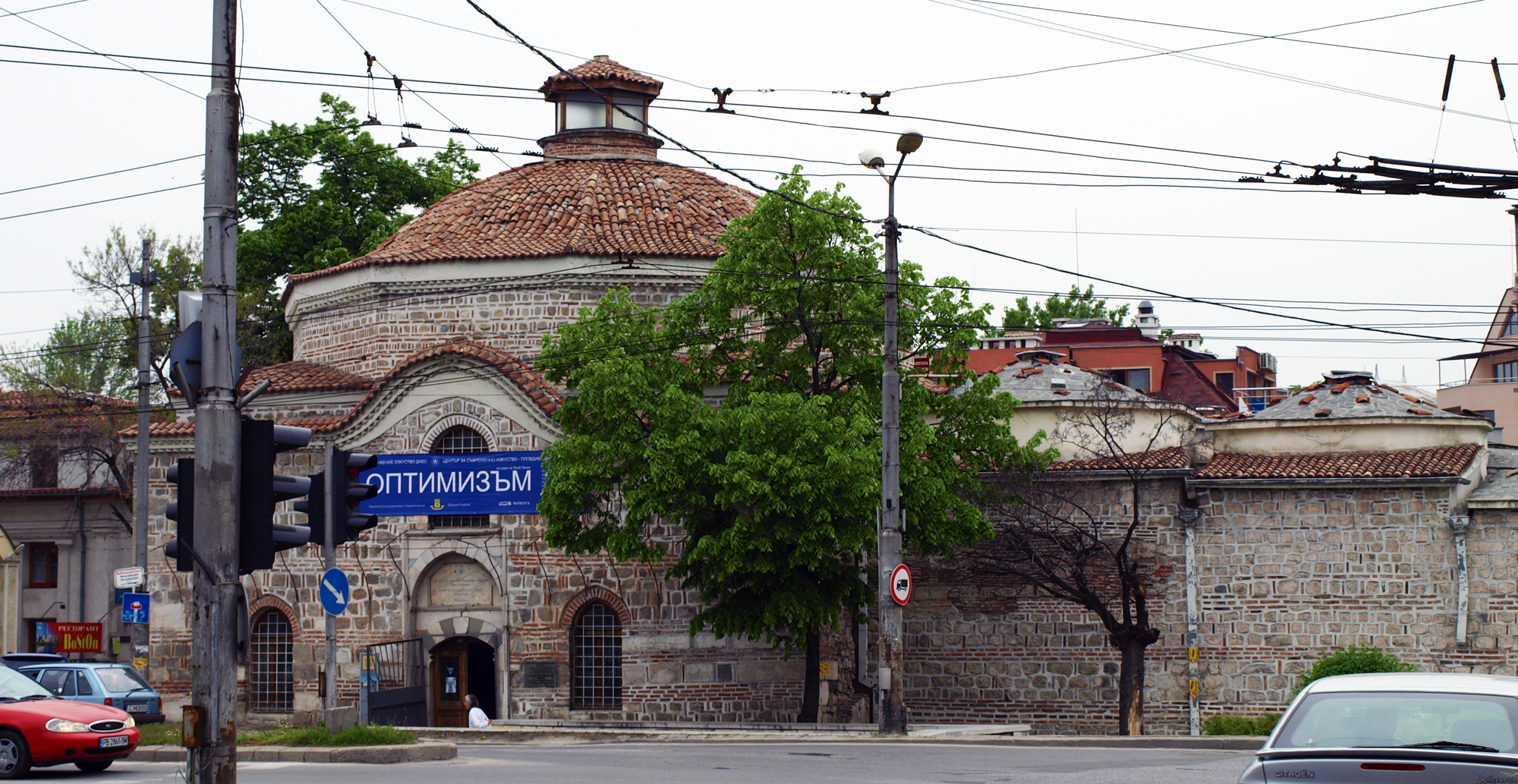
Center of contemporary art Bania Starinna, Plovdiv

He is involved in joint projects with poets Vesselin Sariev and Alexander Sekulov.

Hranov lives and works in Plovdiv.

Works of his are held at the National Art Gallery in Sofia, many other museums across Bulgaria, and private collections in Bulgaria and elsewhere.

Atanas Hranov is an avid seafarer.

== Solo exhibitions ==
1. 1992 – Ata-Ray Gallery, Sofia, Bulgaria
2. 1993 – Center of contemporary art Bania Starinna, Plovdiv, Bulgaria
3. 1993 – Institut Français, Sofia, Bulgaria
4. 1993 – Gallery 88, Luxembourg
5. 1994 – Center of contemporary art Bania Starinna, Plovdiv, Bulgaria
6. 1994 – Ata-Ray Gallery, Sofia, Bulgaria
7. 1995 – Gallery 88, Luxembourg
8. 1995 – Dosev Gallery, Sofia, Bulgaria
9. 1996 – Dyakov Gallery, Plovdiv, Bulgaria
10. 1996 – Lucas Gallery, Plovdiv, Bulgaria
11. 1996 – Ata-Ray Gallery, Sofia, Bulgaria
12. 1997 – Lucas Gallery, Plovdiv, Bulgaria
13. 1997 – Ata-Ray Gallery, Sofia, Bulgaria
14. 1997 – Melina Mercouri Gallery, Hydra, Greece
15. 1999 – Ata-Ray Gallery, Sofia, Bulgaria
16. 1999 – Dyakov Gallery, Plovdiv, Bulgaria
17. 1999 – Lucas Gallery, Plovdiv, Bulgaria
18. 2000 – Lucas Gallery, Plovdiv, Bulgaria
19. 2000 – Artin Gallery, Varna, Bulgaria
20. 2001 – Dyakov Gallery, Plovdiv, Bulgaria
21. 2001 – Gallery 88, Luxembourg
22. 2001 – Art 36 Gallery, Sofia, Bulgaria
23. 2002 – Dyakov Gallery, Plovdiv, Bulgaria
24. 2002 – Yuka Gallery, Varna, Bulgaria
25. 2003 – Dyakov Gallery, Plovdiv, Bulgaria
26. 2003 – Prolet Gallery, Burgas, Bulgaria
27. 2003 – Naturelle Gallery, Munich, Germany
28. 2004 – Dyakov Gallery, Plovdiv, Bulgaria
29. 2004 – Naturelle Gallery, Munich, Germany
30. 2005 – Plovdiv City Art Gallery, Bulgaria
31. 2005 – Fragmenti, George Papazov Gallery, Plovdiv, Bulgaria
32. 2005 – Prolet Gallery, Burgas, Bulgaria
33. 2006 – A Page from a Passport and a Little Hand Luggage, Rakursi Gallery, Sofia, Bulgaria
34. 2006 – Yuka Gallery, Varna, Bulgaria
35. 2006 – George Papazov Gallery, Plovdiv, Bulgaria
36. 2007 – George Papazov Gallery, Plovdiv, Bulgaria
37. 2007 – The Little Female Saints of Valparaiso, Rakursi Gallery, Sofia, Bulgaria
38. 2007 – Yuka Gallery, Varna, Bulgaria
39. 2007 – Prolet Gallery, Burgas, Bulgaria
40. 2008 – George Papazov Gallery, Plovdiv, Bulgaria
41. 2008 – Fragments from my Room, Rakursi Gallery, Sofia, Bulgaria
42. 2009 – The Astronomy of Cherries, Rakursi Gallery, Sofia, Bulgaria
43. 2009 – Prolet Gallery, Burgas, Bulgaria
44. 2010 – Curriculum Vitae, Rakursi Gallery, Sofia, Bulgaria
45. 2010 – The Seventh Hill, Resonance Gallery, Plovdiv, Bulgaria
46. 2010 – The Land of Dreams, Le Papillon Gallery, Varna, Bulgaria
47. 2011 – The History of Halos, Rakursi Gallery, Sofia, Bulgaria
48. 2011 – The Seventh Hill Project, Plovdiv, Bulgaria
49. 2012 – Both Your Faces I Love, Rakursi Gallery, Sofia, Bulgaria
50. 2012 – Little Favourite Portraits, Eva's Gallery, Varna, Bulgaria
51. 2013 – Gallery 88, Luxembourg
52. 2013 – A Voyage to the Isla Negra, Rakursi Gallery, Sofia, Bulgaria
53. 2013 – Paintings, L'Union Gallery, Plovdiv, Bulgaria
54. 2014 – Seducing the Orient, L'Union Gallery, Plovdiv, Bulgaria
55. 2014 – The Summer of my Bays, Rakursi Gallery, Sofia, Bulgaria
56. 2014 – The Boris Christoff Project, Plovdiv, Bulgaria
57. 2014 – Prolet Gallery, Burgas, Bulgaria
58. 2015 – The Chaldeans, Rakursi Gallery, Sofia, Bulgaria
59. 2015 – A Return to Chaldea, Le Papillon Gallery, Varna, Bulgaria
60. 2016 – Balthazar's Kettles, Rakursi Gallery, Sofia, Bulgaria
61. 2016 – Balthazar's Diaries, Philippopolis Gallery, Plovdiv, Bulgaria
62. 2017 – The Clear Outlines of Mr. H., Rakursi Gallery, Sofia, Bulgaria
63. 2017 – Portraits from a Journey, Le Papillon Gallery, Varna, Bulgaria
64. 2017 – Paintings, U PARK Gallery, Plovdiv, Bulgaria
65. 2018 – Breakfast in the Studio, Rakursi Gallery, Sofia, Bulgaria
66. 2018 – Probable Landscape, Prolet Gallery, Burgas, Bulgaria
67. 2018 – Paintings, Philippopolis Gallery, Plovdiv, Bulgaria

== Group exhibitions and projects ==
1. 1992 – 100 Gallery, Malta
2. 1994 – Burgwedel Gallery, Burgwedel, Germany
3. 1994 – De Leile Gallery, Antwerp, Belgium
4. 1994 – Art Expo, Budapest, Hungary
5. 1995 – Oh, Gods, Art 36 Gallery, Sofia, Bulgaria
6. 1996 – The Man and the Document, Center of contemporary art Bania Starinna, Plovdiv, Bulgaria
7. 1997 – Bulgarian Art, Kuwait
8. 1997 – Campo & Campo, Antwerp, Belgium
9. 1999 – Dublin, Ireland
10. 1999 – Gorcum Museum, Gorinchem, Netherlands
11. 2001 – Spirit and Matters – August in Art, Georgi Velchev Art Museum, Varna
12. 2002 – Vinizki Gallery, Munich, Germany
13. 2003 – ″K″ Gallery, Munich, Germany
14. 2003 – 10/5/3 – Painting and Matters, National Exhibition Center for Contemporary Art, Sofia
15. 2004 – Re-Paper, Sariev Gallery, Plovdiv, Bulgaria
16. 2004 – Don Quixote, George Papazov Gallery, Plovdiv, Bulgaria
17. 2004 – ″K″ Gallery, Munich, Germany
18. 2004 – Slapansky & Slapansky Gallery, Munich, Germany
19. 2004 - Schloss von Hohenstein Gallery, Germany
20. 2005 – Salzburg Gallery, Salzburg München Bank, Munich, Germany
21. 2005 – City and Colour, Rakursi Gallery, Sofia, Bulgaria
22. 2005 – Primitivism and Tradition, National Autumn Exhibitions
23. 2005 – Classics – Contemporaries – Future Artists, Aspect Gallery, Plovdiv, Bulgaria
24. 2005 – Nasko H. Stories involving Rum, Ginger, Raisins, and Honey: a collection of paintings and stories (with poet Alexander Sekulov)
25. 2006 – Classics – Contemporaries – Future Artists, Aspect Gallery, #2007 – Nasko H. The Little Female Saints and the Black Pepper Men: a collection of paintings and stories (with poet Alexander Sekulov)
26. 2008 – The Floating City and the Black Pepper Men (with poet Alexander Sekulov), the Ministry of Foreign Affairs Travelling Exhibition, Apollonia Arts Festival 2008
27. 2008 – The Cyrillic Script Project, European Parliament, Brussels
28. 2009 – The Bulgarian Culture Days in Russia, Manege, Moscow
29. 2011 – The Fourth of Plovdiv, Eva's Gallery, Varna, Bulgaria
30. 2012 – Entirely Useful Things (with poet Alexander Sekulov), Rakursi Gallery, Sofia, Bulgaria
31. 2012 – Pushkin & Plyushkin. Collecting House for Entirely Useful Things (with poet Alexander Sekulov), Eva's Gallery, Varna, Bulgaria
32. 2016 – Friends of the Sea Contemporary Art Biennale, Burgas, Bulgaria

== Awards ==
- 2001 – Plovdiv Arts Award
- 2004 – Dyakov Gallery Award
- 2007 – ″Amethyst Rose″ Award for High Artistic Achievements
- 2016 – Friends of the Sea Contemporary Art Biennale Painting Award, Burgas
