= Optophonic Piano =

The Optophonic Piano is an electronic optical instrument created by the Russian Futurist painter Vladimir Baranoff Rossiné.

Vladimir Baranoff Rossiné started working on the instrument in 1916. He performed with it at many events and places, including the Bolshoi Theatre (1924). His wife used to help him in those performances.

The Optophonic Piano generated sounds and projected revolving patterns onto a wall or ceiling by directing a bright light through a series of revolving painted glass disks (painted by Vladimir Baranoff Rossiné himself), filters, mirrors and lenses. The keyboard controlled the combination of the various filters and disks. The variations in opacity of the painted disk and filters were picked up by a photo-electric cell controlling the pitch of a single oscillator. The instrument produced a continuous varying tone which, accompanied by the rotating kaleidoscopic projections was used by Vladimir Baranoff Rossiné at exhibitions and public events.

== See also ==
- List of Russian inventions
