= Zveno (art) =

Zveno (Link) was a group of Ukrainian avant-garde artists formed in the first decade of the 20th century by brothers David Burliuk and Wladimir Burliuk.

Group members included:

- David Burliuk
- Vladimir Burliuk
- Vladimir Baranov-Rossiné
- Alexander Bogomazov
- Aleksandra Ekster

Zveno could also refer to the exhibition staged by David Burliuk in Kyiv. It is described as the first avant-garde exhibition in Russian Empire. Aside from Burliuk, Aleksandra Ekster was cited as one of the organizers of the event, which obtained little success.
