= Eugène Konopatzky =

- Born: January 27, 1887; Lutsk, Russian Empire (today Ukraine)
- Died: October 19, 1962 (age 75); Paris, France
- Known for: Painting, drawing,
- Movement: Post-Impressionism, Fauvism, Modernism

Eugène Konopatzky (Russian: Евгений Игнатьевич Конопацкий, Ukrainian: Конопацький Євген Гнатович; born January 27, 1887, in Lutsk – on October 19, 1962, in Paris) was Russian and Ukrainian painter and printmaker, known artist and modern art theoretician of Russian avant-garde (historically the term "Russian Avant-garde" refers to the art of all countries which were parts of Russia/USSR in the beginning of 20th century).

== Biography ==
In 1914 he organized the exhibition Kiltse ("The Ring") in Kiev, together with Aleksandra Ekster and Alexander Bogomazov among others.

Eugène Konopatzky exhibited from 1925 in Paris, at the Salon des Indépendants.

Since 1927 he exhibited his paintings at the Salon d'Automne.

== Notes ==
- Bénézit, 1976 : Eugène Konopatzky
