= Alexander Sekulov =

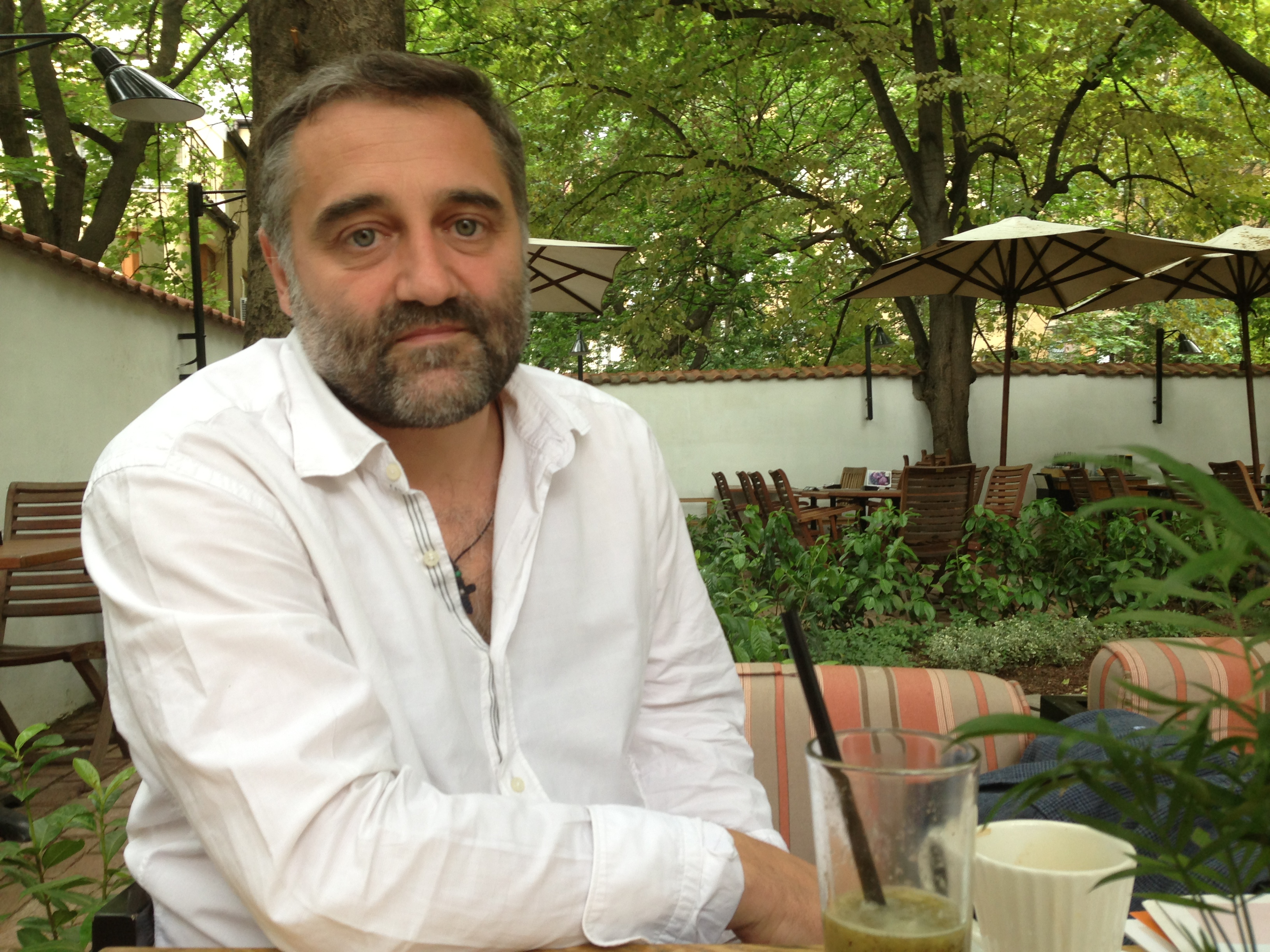
Alexander Sekulov (2013)

Alexander Sekulov (born 6 January 1964, Plovdiv, Bulgaria) is a contemporary Bulgarian writer. He graduated professional school for stage arts as an assistant producer and Bulgarian philology as a master at the Plovdiv University Paisiy Hilendarski. Sekulov's poetry and prose had been translated into English, German, French and Hungarian.

== Books ==
- Seventh Sky (1988, poetry);
- High above the Distance (1997, poetry);
- Enchanting and Light (2003, poetry);
- Maps and Geographies (2010, poetry);
- The Master and the Stones (1996, essays);
- The High Stone Hills (2006, fragments);
- The History of the Minimum Resistance. Chronological novel in one column (2008, non-fiction);
- Light Hotel Rooms (2005, play);
- The Collector of Love Sentences (2007, 2008, novel);
- The Little Saint and the Oranges (2009, novel);
- Nasco H. Stories with Rum, Ginger, Raisons and Honey (2005, art collection published in partnership with Atanas Hranov);
- The Little Saint and the Black Pepper Men (2007, art collection published in partnership with Atanas Hranov).
