= Vladimir Baranov-Rossiné =

French-Russian painter (1888–1944)

- 'Владимир Давидович Баранов-Росіне'
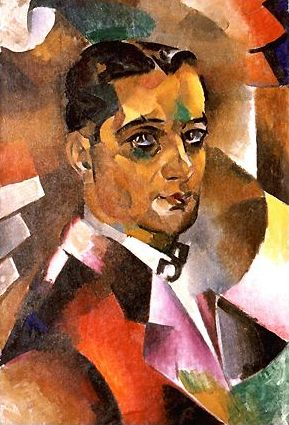
- Self-Portrait, oil on canvas, 1907, 75 x 50cm. Private collection, Paris.
- Born: Shulim Wolf Leib Baranov; 13 January 1888; Velyka Lepetykha, Russian Empire
- Died: January 1944 (aged 56); Auschwitz Concentration Camp, Nazi-occupied Poland
- Occupations: Painter, inventor

Vladimir Davidovich Baranov-Rossiné, also spelled Baranoff-Rossiné (Russian: Владимир Давидович Баранов-Россине; 13 January 1888, Velyka Lepetykha – January 1944, Auschwitz), born Shulim Wolf Leib Baranov, was a painter and sculptor active in Russia and France. His work belonged to the avant-garde movement of Cubo-Futurism. He was also an inventor, author of several patents.

== Biography ==
Vladimir Baranov-Rossiné was born in Kherson, Kherson Governorate, Russian Empire (in present-day Kherson Oblast, Ukraine) in a Jewish family.

In 1902, he studied at the School of the Society for the Furthering of the Arts in St. Petersburg. From 1903 to 1907, he attended the Imperial Academy of Arts in St. Petersburg. In 1908 he entered the Russian Academy of Arts in St. Petersburg, but was expelled in 1909, just after his first year, for not attending classes. In 1908 he exhibited with the group Zveno (The Link) in Kyiv organized by the artist David Burliuk and his brother Wladimir Burliuk.

In 1910, he moved to Paris, where until 1914 he was a resident in the artist's colony La Ruche together with Alexander Archipenko, Sonia Delaunay-Terk, Nathan Altman and others. He exhibited regularly in Paris after 1911.

He returned to Russia in 1914, then lived in Norway throughout the First World War. In 1916, he had a solo exhibition in Oslo. In 1918, he had exhibits with the union of artists Mir Iskusstva (World of Art) in Petrograd (St. Petersburg). In the same year, he had an exhibition with the Jewish Society for the Furthering of the Arts in Moscow, together with Nathan Altman, El Lissitzky and David Shterenberg. He participated at the First State Free Art Exhibition in Petrograd in 1919.

In 1919 he married Yudin Raisa from Kherson. In March 1920, they had a son named Evgeny, but Raisa died from complications after child birth.

In 1922, Baranov-Rossiné was the teacher at the Higher Artistic-Technical Workshops (VKhUTEMAS) in Moscow and exhibited in the First Russian Art Exhibition in Berlin.

In 1924, he had the first presentation of his optophonic piano during a performance at the Bolshoi Theatre in Moscow - a synaesthetic instrument that was capable of creating sounds and coloured lights, patterns and textures simultaneously.

In 1925, he emigrated to France. In 1943, during the German occupation of France, he was arrested and deported to the Auschwitz concentration camp where he was murdered in January 1944.

== Inventions ==
Through continuous experimenting, Baranoff-Rossine applied the art of colour to military art, using the technique of camouflage or the Cameleon process, which he marketed together with Robert Delaunay. Baranov-Rossiné is credited as an author of pointillist and dynamic military camouflage. He also invented a "photochromometer" that allowed the determination of the qualities of precious stones. In another field, he perfected a machine that made, sterilized and distributed fizzy drinks, the "Multiperco", and this received several technical awards at the time.

== See also ==
- List of Russian artists
