= Andréi Nakov =

French-Bulgarian art historian (1941–2022)

- Born: 13 November 1941; Sofia, Bulgaria
- Died: 22 May 2022 (aged 80); France
- Occupation: Art historian

Andréi Borisov Nakov (Bulgarian: Андрей Борисов Наков; 13 November 1941 – 19 May 2022) was a Bulgarian-born French art historian engaged principally in research on Russian non-objective art, Cubo-futurism, Dada, and Constructivism, where his work as a precursor in these areas gained him an authoritative reputation.

== Career ==
He had published numerous theoretical studies, monographs and exhibition catalogues on the Russian avant-garde, Futurism, Dada, Constructivism, contemporary art and European abstract art.

Since the publication of his critical edition of the writings of Malewicz (Malevich) by Champ Libre, Paris 1975, he had engaged in research on the work of this artist and has published the four-volume Kazimir Malewicz le peintre absolu in April 2007 (Thalia Édition, Paris). Part of this work's documentation comprising the catalogue raisonné of the artist's plastic work was published in 2002 (Éditions Adam Biro, Paris) under the title Kazimir Malewicz, Catalogue raisonné. In January 2016, for the fifth consecutive year Andréi Nakov gets Moral Rights over the work of Aleksandra Ekster.

== Bibliography ==
=== Monographic studies ===
- Alexandra Exter (Paris, 1972)
- Papazoff : Franc-tireur du surréalisme (Brussels, 1973)
- 2 Stenberg 2 (Paris-London-Toronto, 1975)
- Nina Kogan (Zürich, 1985)
- Alexandre Bogomazov (Musée d'Art Moderne, Toulouse et Musée d'Art Ukrainien, Kiev, 1991)
- Kazimir Malewicz, Catalogue raisonné, Éditions Adam Biro (Paris, 2002)
- Malévitch : Aux avant-gardes de l'art moderne, coll. Découvertes Gallimard (n° 445) (Paris, 2003)
- Kazimir Malewicz, le peintre absolu, Thalia Édition (Paris, 2007)
- Kandinsky, the Enigma of the first abstract painting, IRSA Publishing (Cracow, 2015)

=== Critical translations of Russian theoretical texts ===
- Nikolai Tarabukin, Le Dernier Tableau presented by Andrei B. Nakov, translated by Michel Pétris and André B. Nakov (Champ Libre, Paris, 1972 et 1980; traduction espagnole, 1977)
- Malévitch, Écrits, Champ Libre, 1975 et 1986 (Édition italienne, Milan, 1977)
- Viktor Shklovsky, Résurrection du Mot (Champ Libre, Paris, 1985)
- Nemours au Prieuré de Salagon (Paris, 2004)

=== Thematic works ===
- Abstrait/Concret : Art non-objectif russe et polonais - Édition française (Paris, 1981, traduit en russe sous le titre Bespredmetnyj mir, éd. Iskusstvo, Moscow, 1997)
- Abstrait/Concret : Art non-objectif russe et polonais - Édition russe
- L'avant-garde russe - Édition française (Paris, 1984 - traductions allemande, italienne, anglaise et américaine en 1976 et russe, éd. Iskusstvo, Moscow in 1991)
- L'avant-garde russe - Édition russe éd. Iskusstvo, Moscow, 1991

=== Exhibition catalogues ===
- Tatlin's Dream (Fischer Fine Art, London, 1973)
- Russian Constructivism, the Laboratory Period (Art Gallery of Ontario, Toronto, 1975)
- Kasimir Malevich (Tate Gallery, London, 1976)
- The Suprematist straight line (London, 1977)
- Liberated Colour and Form (Scottish National Gallery of Modern Art, Edinburgh and Sheffield Art Gallery, The Art Council of Great Britain, 1978)
- The First Russian Show (London, 1983)
- Dada-Constructivism : The Janus Face of the twenties (London, 1984)
- Mikhail Larionov (Frankfurt-Genèva, 1987–1988)
- Dada and Constructivism - Édition anglaise (Tokyo, 1988)
