= Ukrainians in Germany =

Ethnic Ukrainians or Ukrainian citizens residing in Germany

Ukrainians in Germany Українці в Німеччині
- (Ukraine) (Germany)
- Ukrainian population in Germany 2021: The darker the color, the larger the Ukrainian population in the district

Total population
- 1,164,200 (2022) roughly 1.38% of the total population

Regions with significant populations
- Berlin, Munich, Hanover Region, Nuremberg, Hamburg, Cologne, Düsseldorf, Dortmund, Frankfurt, Leipzig

Languages
- German, Ukrainian, Russian

Religion
- Orthodox Christianity with Judaism, Catholicism, Ukrainian Greek Catholic Church, Protestantism and Islam

Related ethnic groups
- Ukrainians, Ukrainians in Hungary, Ukrainian Canadians, British Ukrainians, Ukrainian Australians, Rusyn Americans, Ukrainians in Poland, Ukrainians in Slovakia, other Slavic peoples especially East Slavs

Ukrainians in Germany (Ukrainian: Українці в Німеччині, German: Ukrainer in Deutschland) currently form one of the largest ethnic minorities in the country. Despite the long history of contacts between the two groups, significant Ukrainian presence in Germany started only after the First World War. Following the Russian invasion of Ukraine, the number of Ukrainians in Germany experienced a major growth due to the arrival of refugees.

== History ==
=== Middle Ages ===
Political and trade connections between German lands and territory of today's Ukraine are recorded starting from the 9th century. In 959 an embassy of Olga, Princess of Kyiv, arrived to the court of Holy Roman Emperor Otto I. In 973 ambassadors of Yaropolk, son of Sviatoslav of Kyiv, took part in a congress in Quedlinburg. Princes Volodymyr the Great and Yaroslav the Wise also exchanged ambassadors with German rulers.

In 1056 Henry IV, Holy Roman Emperor, gave refuge to Anastasia, daughter of Yaroslav, and wife of king Andrew I of Hungary. In 1073 Iziaslav, son of Yaroslav, also sought refuge at Henry's court after being deposed from the Kyivan throne by his brother Sviatoslav. In 1089 Henry IV married Eupraxia, the daughter of Kyivan prince Vsevolod. However, due to intrigues and political conflicts, their marriage eventually collapsed, and Eupraxis returned to Kyiv. In 1189, prince Volodymyr, son of Yaroslav Osmomysl, visited the residence of Frederick Barbarossa, seeking alliance in order to restore his rule in Galicia.

=== Modern era ===
Starting from the 16th century, students from Ukrainian lands are recorded in documents of German universities. Among them was the son of Kyiv Voivode Fryderyk Proński, who studied at the University of Heidelberg, as well as numerous Ruthenian students from Volhynia, Galicia and Podolia. Notable Ukrainian alumni of the University of Leipzig included Meletius Smotrytsky and Alexander Bezborodko.

After the deposition of Ukrainian Cossack hetman Ivan Mazepa, his allies Pylyp Orlyk and Andriy Voynarovsky spent some time in Germany as political émigrés. Following the liquidation of Ukrainian autonomy, in 1791 Vasily Kapnist secretly travelled to Berlin in order to seek help for a possible uprising against the Russian Empire.

Among prominent Ukrainian figures who were active in Germany during the 19th century were Mykola Ziber and Serhiy Podolynsky. Notable Ukrainian students at German universities during that period included Mykola Lysenko and Andrey Sheptytsky. Starting from the late 19th century, inhabitants of Western Ukraine travelled to Germany as seasonal workers.

=== 20th century ===
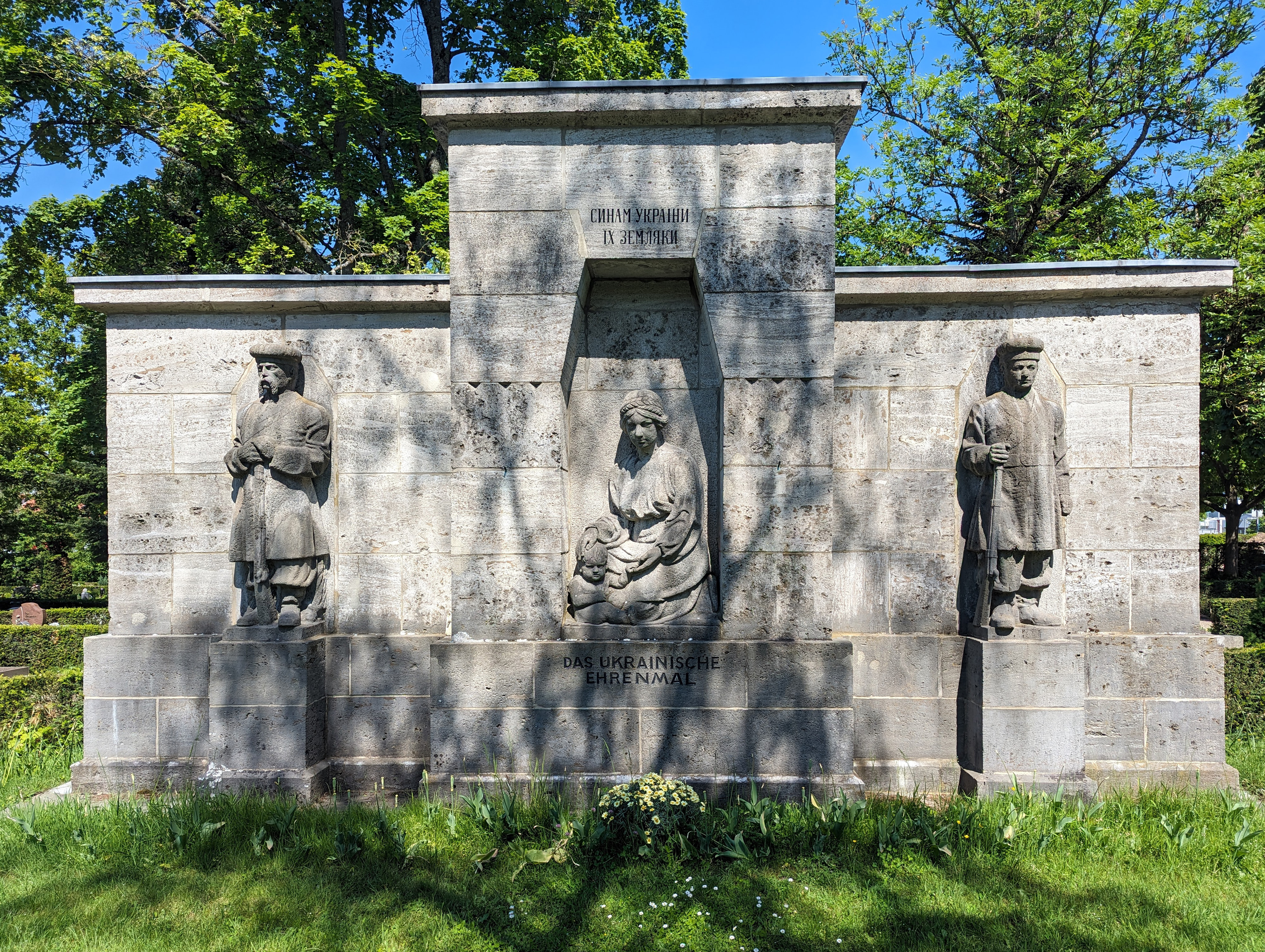
Monument to Ukrainian prisoners of World War I in Rastatt

During World War I Berlin became the seat of the Union for the Liberation of Ukraine. Many ethnic Ukrainian prisoners of war were kept in German camps in Rastatt, Wetzlar and Salzwedel, and later formed the core of the Bluecoat division of the Ukrainian People's Republic. Following the signing of the Treaty of Brest, Ukraine established its diplomatic mission in German Empire, headed by Oleksandr Sevriuk, and later Theodor von Steinheil. In September 1918 Germany was visited by Pavlo Skoropadsky, Hetman of Ukraine.

Following the establishment of the Directorate, Ukraine was represented in Germany by Mykola Porsh, later replaced by Mykola von Wassilko. During the same period, West Ukrainian People's Republic had its own representation in Germany, headed by Roman Smal-Stocki. In 1919-1922 a consulate of the Ukrainian People's Republic was active in Munich, headed by Vasyl Orenchuk. Between 1921 and 1923 Ukrainian SSR was represented in Germany by Voldemar Aussem. Following the Treaty of Rapallo (1922), a trade representation of Soviet Ukraine was opened in Berlin. During the 1920s, Germany was visited by Pavlo Tychyna, Mykola Khvylyovy, Alexander Dovzhenko and other Ukrainian authors. In 1926 a Ukrainian scientific institute was established in Berlin.

Starting from 1919, Germany became a centre of Ukrainian political emigration. Among notable figures of the Ukrainian community in Germany during the Interwar period were Zenon Kuzelia, Bohdan Lepky and Volodymyr Stakhiv. Political leaders such as Pavlo SKoropadsky, Yevhen Konovalets and Yevhen Petrushevych also resided in Germany during that time. In 1940 a Ukrainian Greek Catholic apostolic visitation was founded in Berlin.

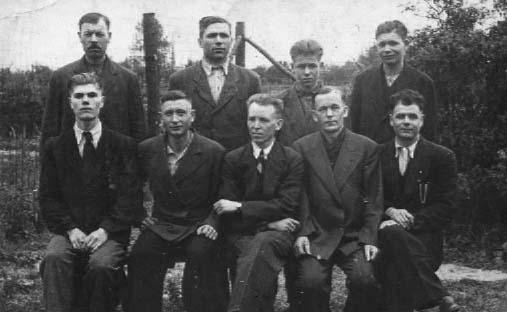
A group of Ukrainian Ostarbeiter in Germany, 1943

During the Second World War, up to 3 million Ukrainians ended up in Germany as refugees, prisoners of war, deportees or forced labourers (Ostarbeiter). In 1944, a central representation of Ukrainians from the Reichskommissariat was established in Berlin. Ukrainians from the General Governorate were represented separately. During that period, two major Ukrainian civic organizations were permitted to function in Nazi Germany: the pro-nationalist Ukrainian National Union and the pro-hetman Ukrainian Hromada. Separate organizations served in order to represent the interest of stateless Ukrainians and Ukrainian students.

Following World War II, the majority of Ukrainians residing in Germany were repatriated, with approximately 180,000 remaining in displaced persons camps in West Germany. Due to gradual resettlement of the latter to Western Europe, Americas and Australia, by the early 1950s the Ukrainian population in Germany had decreased to approximately 20,000. in 1946 the Ukrainian Free University resumed its activities in Munich. Shevchenko Scientific Society and Ukrainian Free Academy of Sciences also established themselves in postwar Germany.

In terms of religion, the majority of the Ukrainian diaspora in the country belonged to the Greek Catholic and Ukrainian Autocephalous Orthodox Churches. Numerous Ukrainian educational establishments had appeared during the first postwar years, but their number significantly decreased by 1970. Ukrainian cultural establishments and publishing houses also resumed their activities. For a period of time, the Government of the Ukrainian People's Republic in exile resided in Munich, and the city also became the coordinational centre of the Anti-Bolshevik Bloc of Nations.

In 1999, a conflict arose involving the German Foreign Minister Joschka Fischer, who eased conditions for citizens of the former Soviet states to get German visas. Many people opposed this claim that it enabled thousands to enter Germany illegally using the abuse of visas granted to them. The majority of Ukrainians that are in Germany on scholarship are there on such visas, adding to the controversy.

=== Modern history ===
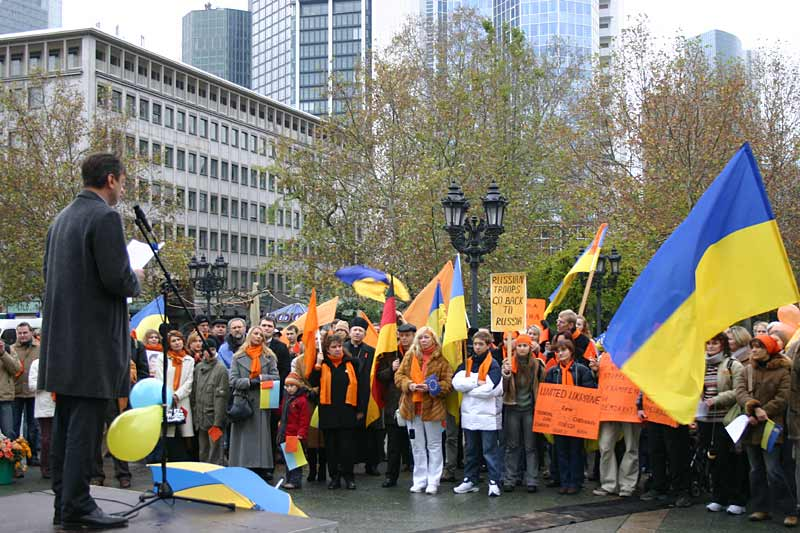
A demonstration in support of the Orange Revolution in Frankfurt am Main, 2004

The Russo-Ukrainian war has led to millions of Ukrainians fleeing their country, many of whom ended up in Germany. In 2021, before the start of the full-scale Russian invasion of Ukraine, it was of 155,310. At the end of 2022 there were approximately 1,164,200 Ukrainians in Germany. Germany's Ukrainians have created a number of institutions and organizations, such as the Central Association of Ukrainians in Germany and Association of Ukrainian Diaspora in Germany.

Some Ukrainian organizations in Germany have accused Germans of racism and prejudice, and of the belief that Ukrainians are only in Germany to work illegally.

== Notable Ukrainians in Germany ==
- Emma Andijewska - modern poet, writer and painter
- Eugene Archipenko - politician, agronomist, and beekeeper
- Taras Bidenko - professional boxer who fights in the heavyweight division
- Sergei Bortkiewicz - Romantic composer and pianist
- Oleg Bryjak - bass-baritone opera singer
- Gennadij Cudinovic - freestyle wrestler
- Tamara Desni - actress
- Alexander Dimitrenko - former professional boxer who competed from 2001 to 2019, and held the European heavyweight title from 2010 to 2011
- Alexander Donchenko - chess grandmaster
- Panas Fedenko - socialist politician, historian, and revolutionary
- Eugen Gopko - professional footballer who plays as a midfielder for TSG Pfeddersheim
- Iryna Gurevych - computer scientist, Professor at the Department of Computer Science of the Technical University of Darmstadt and Director of Ubiquitous Knowledge Processing Lab
- Andrej Hunko - member of the German Bundestag from 2009 to 2025
- Stanislav Iljutcenko - footballer
- Denis Kaliberda - volleyball player of Ukrainian origins, member of the Germany men's national volleyball team, bronze medallist of the 2014 World Championship
- Mateo Klimowicz - professional footballer
- Platon Kornyljak - Ukrainian Greek Catholic hierarch in Germany
- Ihor Kostetskyi - writer, playwright, translator, literary critic and publisher.
- Ilko-Sascha Kowalczuk - historian
- Oleh Kucherenko - wrestler
- Lenn Kudrjawizki - actor and musician
- Andrei Kushnir - fine art painter
- Andriy Livytskyi - politician, diplomat, statesman, and lawyer
- Lisa Matviyenko - tennis player
- Isaak Mazepa - one of the central figures of the 1917 Ukrainian revolution
- Tatiana Morosuk - mechanical engineer whose research analyzes exergy, and especially the exergy of refrigeration systems
- Anatoliy Mushchynka - footballer
- Nadja Nadgornaja - former handball player for Borussia Dortmund
- Noize Generation (Jewgeni Grischbowski) - music producer and DJ
- Robert Olejnik (pilot) - Luftwaffe flying ace of World War II, credited with 41 aerial victories claimed in some 680 combat missions
- Denis Osadchenko - footballer
- Jaroslaw Pelenski - historian, political scientist and professor emeritus
- Yevhen Petrushevych - lawyer, politician, and president of the West Ukrainian People's Republic formed after the collapse of the Austro-Hungarian Empire in 1918
- Peter Potichnyj - political scientist and historian
- Michael Prawdin (Charol) - historical writer
- Maria Protsenko - architect known for her role as the chief architect for Pripyat during the Chornobyl disaster
- Boris Rajewsky - biophysicist, who was one of the most influential researchers on the impact of radiation on living organisms in the 20th century
- Mariana Sadovska - actress, singer, musician, recording artist, and composer, resident in Cologne
- Iana Salenko - ballet dancer, principal dancer at the Berlin State Ballet
- Aljona Savchenko - pair skater
- Aleksey Semenenko - classical violinist
- Leo Sheljuzhko - entomologist who specialized in Lepidoptera, Rhopalocera
- Alex Simirenko - sociologist
- Pavlo Skoropadsky - Ukrainian aristocrat, military leader and statesman who served as the hetman of the Ukrainian State
- Tanja Szewczenko - figure skater
- Lilia Usik - politician serving as a member of the Abgeordnetenhaus of Berlin since 2023
- Oleg Velyky - handball player

== See also ==
- Germany–Ukraine relations
- Germans in Ukraine
- Ukrainians in the Czech Republic
- Ukrainians in Poland
- Vitsche – a Berlin-based NGO advocating freedom and development for Ukraine
