= Alexander Archipenko =

Ukrainian-American avant-garde artist and sculptor (1887–1964)

- Олександр Архипенко
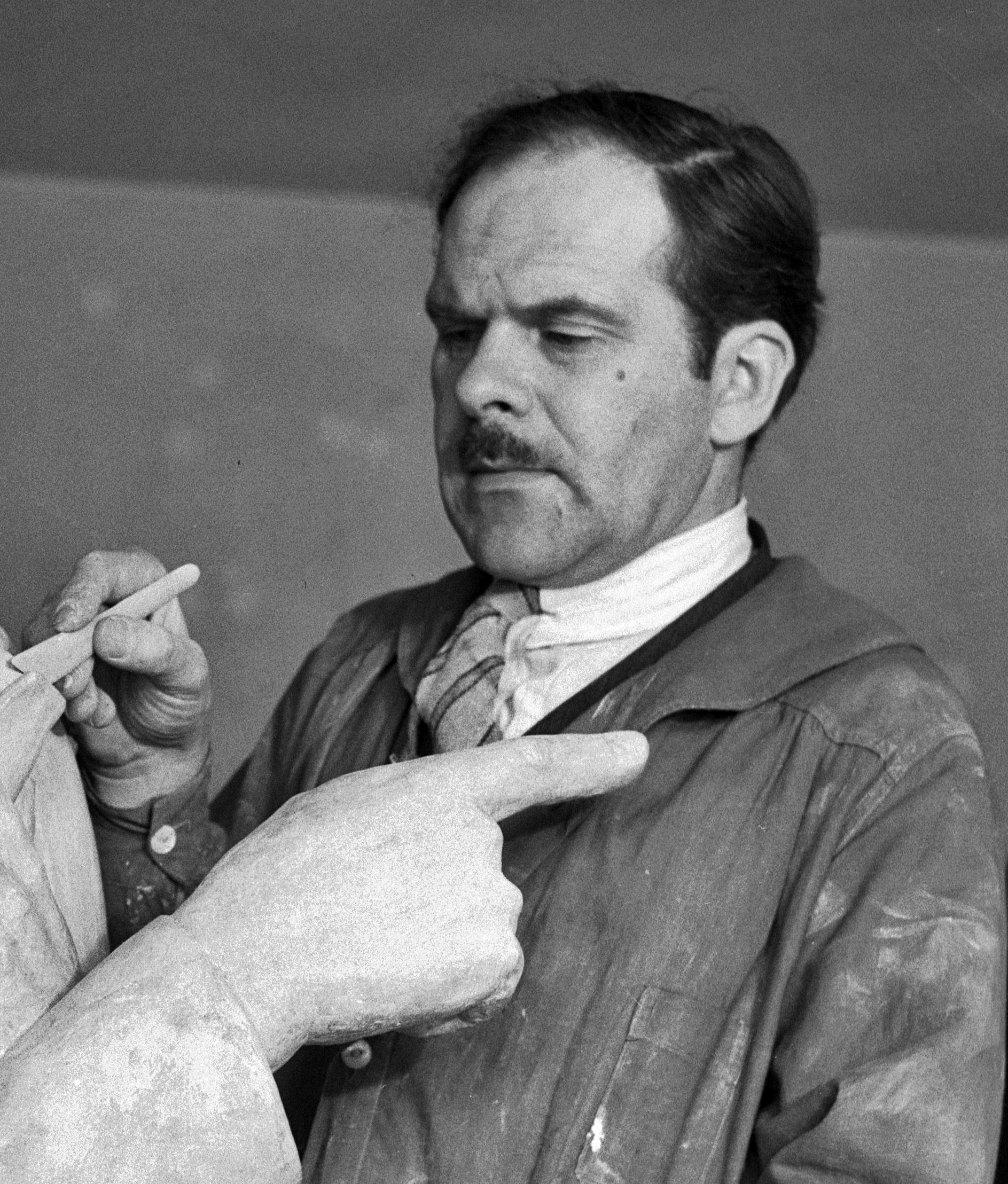
- Archipenko in 1935
- Born: Alexander Porfyrovych Archipenko; 30 May [O.S. 18 May] 1887; Kiev, Russian Empire (Present-day Kyiv, Ukraine)
- Died: 25 February 1964 (aged 76); New York City, New York, U.S.
- Education: Kyiv Art School
- Known for: Sculpture
- Notable work: The Boxers (1914)
- Movement: Cubism
- Elected: American Academy of Arts and Letters (1962)

Alexander Porfyrovych Archipenko (Note: Ukrainian: Олександр Порфирович Архипенко, romanized: Oleksandr Porfyrovych Arkhypenko) (30 May [O.S. 18 May] 1887 – 25 February 1964) was a Ukrainian-American avant-garde artist, sculptor, and graphic artist, active in France and the United States. He was one of the first to apply the principles of Cubism to architecture, analyzing human figures into geometrical forms.

== Early life and education ==
La Vie Familiale (Family Life), 1912, height approx. 6 feet (1.8 m). Exhibited at the 1912 Salon d'Automne, Paris and the 1913 Armory Show in New York City, Chicago and Boston. Photograph from Comœdia Illustré (1912) of the original sculpture, later accidentally destroyed

Alexander Archipenko was born in Kyiv (Russian Empire, now Ukraine) on 30 May 1887, to Porfiry Antonowych Archipenko and Poroskowia Vassylivna Machowa Archipenko; he was the younger brother of Eugene Archipenko. His father, Porfiry, was an engineer and inventor who worked as a professor at Kyiv University, but also drew icons as a hobby on the side. Porfiry himself likely learned this from his father, who also painted icons. However, the family encouraged Oleksandr to pursue a scientific profession, instead of art. He initially studied at the Gottlieb Walker Men's Gymnasium No. 7 in Kyiv.

On 24 September 1902, Porfiry requested admission for his son, Oleksandr, to the third academic year of the Kyiv Art School (KKhU), which was granted permission to happen. On 12 January 1902, Oleksandr requested permission to transfer to the sculpture department of the Kyiv Art School, which was then granted. However, he was expelled before his graduation in November 1905 for participating in student protests over the Russian Revolution of 1905. The protests had been aimed towards reforms regarding the educational process and the dismissal of certain teachers at the school.

== Early career ==
In 1906 he continued his education in the arts by joining a "free studio" (otherwise known as a "Comradely Workshop") organized by students on Velyka Zhytomyrska Street in Kyiv, which was headed by the landscape artist Serhiy Svetoslavsky. Later that year, the studio had an exhibition, in which he showcased some of his early work (most of which have subsequently been lost), including his sculptures "Zaporozhian Cossack", which was described as a madly swift pose, "Horror", which conveyed helplessness and malice, and "Judas" which showcased Judas climbing a scorched rock. Overall, his early work in the studio was characterized by what has been described as "restlessness" and exploring emotional tension and dynamic forms. He was particularly noted by the studio for having a "passionate, unrestrained desire to paint and master colors." However, later that year in 1906, he decided to move to Moscow in order to have a chance to exhibit his work in some group shows and also attend courses at the Moscow School of Painting, Sculpture and Architecture. After finding that the environment did not fit him, he decided to move again, this time permanently away from the Russian Empire.

Archipenko moved to Paris in 1908 and quickly enrolled in the École des Beaux-Arts, which he left after a few weeks because he found it old-fashioned and academic. He then decided to work independently, self-studying at museums such as the Louvre, which he attended daily. At the Louvre, he was inspired by Egyptian and early Greek art, which he preferred over contemporary art such as Rodin, whom he described as making sculptures that were broken and tortured. He then started making sculptures, including "Adam and Eve" in terracotta upon his arrival and then a year later "Head on Knees". During this time, his art style was characterized by "heavy generalized masses", which drew inspiration from archaic arts, such as the idols that he had seen near the University of Kyiv when he was growing up. He was a resident in the artist's colony La Ruche, among émigré Ukrainian artists: Wladimir Baranoff-Rossine, Sonia Delaunay-Terk, and Nathan Altman.

After 1910 he had exhibitions at Salon des Indépendants, Salon d'Automne together with Aleksandra Ekster, Kazimir Malevich, Vadym Meller, Sonia Delaunay-Terk, Georges Braque, André Derain, and others.

In 1912, Archipenko had his first personal exhibition at the Museum Folkwang at Hagen in Germany, and from 1912 to 1914 he was teaching at his own Art School in Paris.

Untitled, 1912, published in Action, Cahiers individualistes de philosophie et d'art, October 1920

Recherche de plastique, 1913. Exhibited at Erster Deutscher Herbstsalon, Berlin, 1913, an exhibition organized by Herwarth Walden (Galerie Der Sturm), including Metzinger, Delaunay, Gleizes, Léger, Marcoussis and Picabia

Four of Archipenko's Cubist sculptures, including Family Life and five of his drawings, appeared in the controversial Armory Show in 1913 in New York City. These works were caricatured in the New York World.

Archipenko moved to Nice in 1914. In 1920 he participated in Twelfth Biennale Internazionale dell'Arte di Venezia in Italy and started his own Art school in Berlin the following year. In 1922 Archipenko participated in the First Russian Art Exhibition in the Gallery van Diemen in Berlin together with Aleksandra Ekster, Kazimir Malevich, Solomon Nikritin, El Lissitzky, and others.

In 1923, he emigrated to the United States. He became a U.S. citizen in 1929. In 1933 he exhibited at the Ukrainian pavilion in Chicago as part of the Century of Progress World's Fair. Archipenko contributed the most to the success of the Ukrainian pavilion. His works occupied one room and were valued at $25,000.

In 1936 Archipenko participated in an exhibition Cubism and Abstract Art in New York as well as numerous exhibitions across Europe and other places in the U.S. He was elected to the American Academy of Arts and Letters in 1962.

Alexander Archipenko died on February 25, 1964, in New York City. He is interred at Woodlawn Cemetery in The Bronx, New York City.

== Contribution to art ==
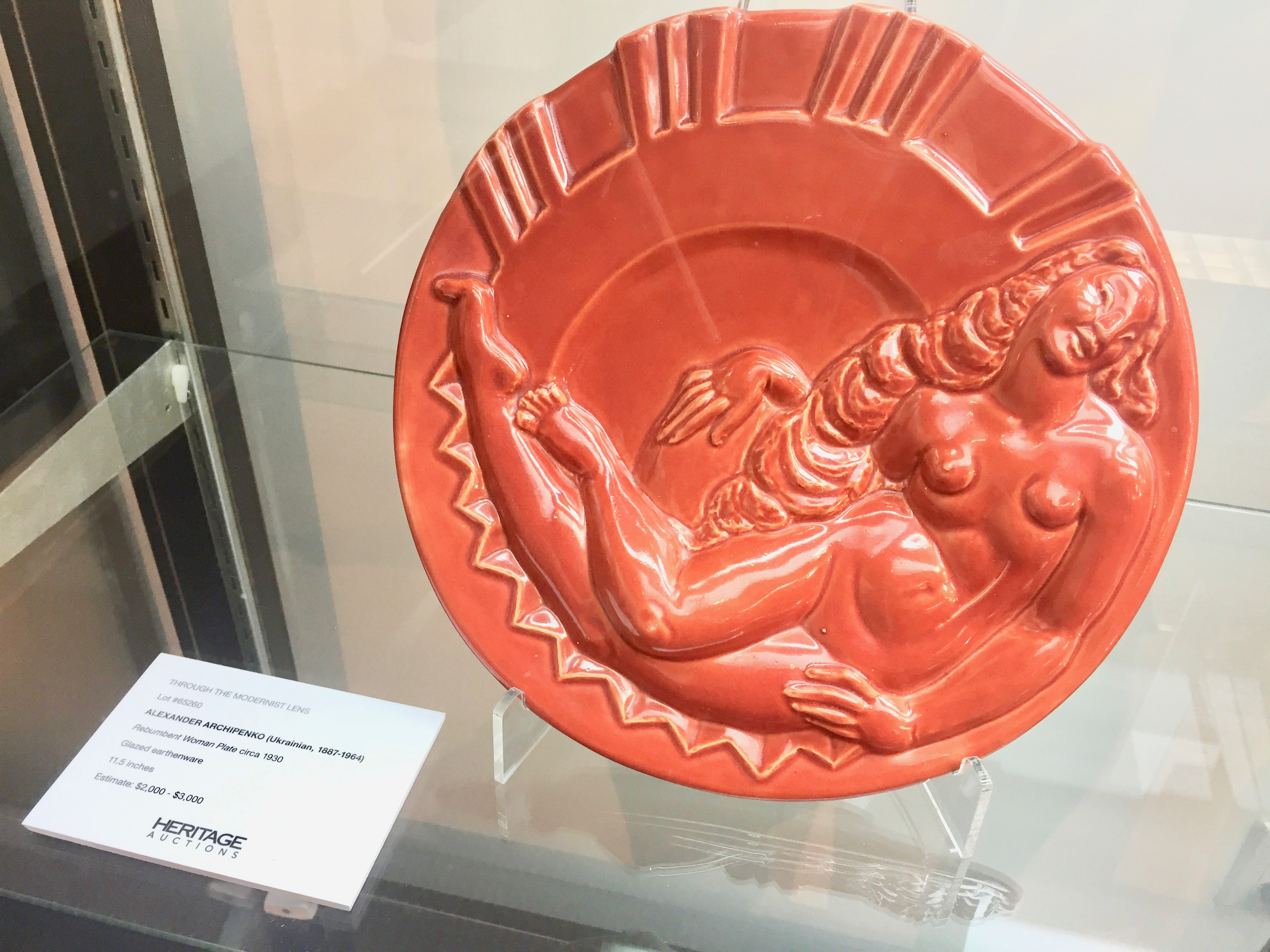
Recumbent Woman Plate circa 1930 by Alexander Archipenko.

Statuette, 1916

(center) Jean Metzinger, c.1913, Le Fumeur (Man with Pipe), Carnegie Museum of Art, Pittsburgh; (left) Alexander Archipenko, 1914, Danseuse du Médrano (Médrano II), (right) Archipenko, 1913, Pierrot-carrousel, Solomon R. Guggenheim Museum, New York. Published in Le Petit Comtois, 13 March 1914

Archipenko, along with the French-Hungarian sculptor Joseph Csaky, exhibited at the first public manifestations of Cubism in Paris; the Salon des Indépendants and Salon d'Automne, 1910 and 1911, being the first, after Pablo Picasso, to employ the Cubist style in three dimensions. Archipenko departed from the neo-classical sculpture of his time, using faceted planes and negative space to create a new way of looking at the human figure, showing a number of views of the subject simultaneously. He is known for having introducied sculptural voids, and for his inventive mixing of genres throughout his career: devising 'sculpto-paintings', and later experimenting with materials such as clear acrylic and terra cotta. Inspired by the works of Pablo Picasso and Georges Braque, he is also credited for introducing the collage to wider audiences with his Medrano series.

The sculptor Ann Weaver Norton apprenticed with Archipenko for a number of years.

== Public collections ==
Among the public collections holding works by Alexander Archipenko are:

- The Addison Gallery of American Art (Andover, Massachusetts)
- The Art Institute of Chicago
- The Mary and Leigh Block Museum of Art (Northwestern University, Illinois)
- Brigham Young University Museum of Art (Utah)
- Chi-Mei Museum (Taiwan)
- The Delaware Art Museum (Wilmington, Delaware)
- The Denver Art Museum (Colorado)
- The Fine Arts Museums of San Francisco
- The Guggenheim Museum (New York City)
- The Hermitage Museum (Saint Petersburg)
- The Hirshhorn Museum and Sculpture Garden (Washington D.C.)
- The Honolulu Museum of Art
- Indiana University Art Museum (Bloomington)
- The Los Angeles County Museum of Art
- The Maier Museum of Art (Randolph-Macon Woman's College, Virginia)
- The Milwaukee Art Museum
- The Minneapolis Institute of Art (Minneapolis)
- The Montgomery Museum of Fine Arts (Alabama)
- The Museum of Fine Arts, Boston
- The Museum of Fine Arts, Houston
- The Museum of Modern Art (New York City)
- The National Museum of Serbia (Belgrade, Serbia)
- The Nasher Sculpture Center (Dallas, Texas)
- The National Gallery of Art (Washington D.C.)
- National Museum Cardiff
- The North Carolina Museum of Art
- The Norton Simon Museum (Pasadena, California)
- The Peggy Guggenheim Collection (Venice)
- The Philadelphia Museum of Art (Pennsylvania)
- The Phillips Collection (Washington D.C.)
- The Portland Art Museum (Portland, Oregon)
- The Portland Museum of Art (Maine)
- Salisbury House (Des Moines, Iowa)
- The San Antonio Art League Museum (Texas)
- The San Diego Museum of Art (California)
- The Sheldon Memorial Art Gallery (Lincoln, Nebraska)
- The Smithsonian American Art Museum (Washington D.C.)
- Städel Museum (Frankfurt)
- Tate Modern (London)
- The Tel Aviv Museum of Art (Israel)
- The Ukrainian Museum (New York City)
- Von der Heydt-Museum (Wuppertal, Germany)
- Walker Art Center (Minnesota)
- The Cleveland Cultural Gardens (Ukrainian Garden) in Rockefeller Park (Ohio)
- Fundación D.O.P. (Caracas)
- Museum de Fundatie (Zwolle, Netherlands)

Archipenko's 14.5-foot (4.4 m) tall cubist statue of King Solomon is installed at the University of Pennsylvania campus. Archipenko began work on a smaller prototype of the statue in 1964, but died before the work was finished, leaving his wife to oversee its completion. The full-sized statue was completed in 1968 and was donated to the university in 1985.

== Commemoration and Legacy ==
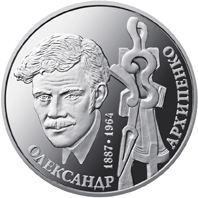
The jubilee coin of the NBU is dedicated to Oleksandr Arkhipenko

During his lifetime Arkhipenko maintained close ties with the Ukrainian community in the USA, participating in the creation of monuments to Shevchenko, Franko and Prince Volodymyr on American soil.

A street in the Obolonskyi District of Kyiv and a street in the Sofiivka area of Lviv are named in his honour.

On May 30, 2017, Ukraine celebrated 130 years since the birth of Oleksandr Arkhipenko. On November 9, 2017, the National Bank of Ukraine circulated a 2-hryvnia commemorative coin dedicated to the artist. His portrait is depicted on the reverse of the coin.

== Gallery ==
Le baiser (The Kiss), 1910

Portrait de Mme Kameneff

Venus, 1910–11

L'Héros (The Hero), ca.1912

Femme Marchant (Woman Walking), 1912

Dancers (Der Tanz), 1912, original plaster, 24 in. This first version of Dancers was illustrated on the front cover of The Sketch, 29 October 1913, London

Zwei Körper (Two Bodies), 1912–13

Roter Tanz (Danse rouge, Blue Dancer), 1912–13

Femme à l'Éventail (Woman with a Fan), 1913, Tel Aviv Museum of Art

Pierrot-carrousel, 1913, painted plaster, Solomon R. Guggenheim Museum, New York

Danseuse du Médrano (Médrano II), 1914, Solomon R. Guggenheim Museum, New York

Flat Torso, 1914

Sculpto-peinture

Alexander Archipenko, c.1920, Femme assise (Composition), 31.1 x 23.2 cm, gouache on paper

Femmes - Vases (Women - Vases), 1919

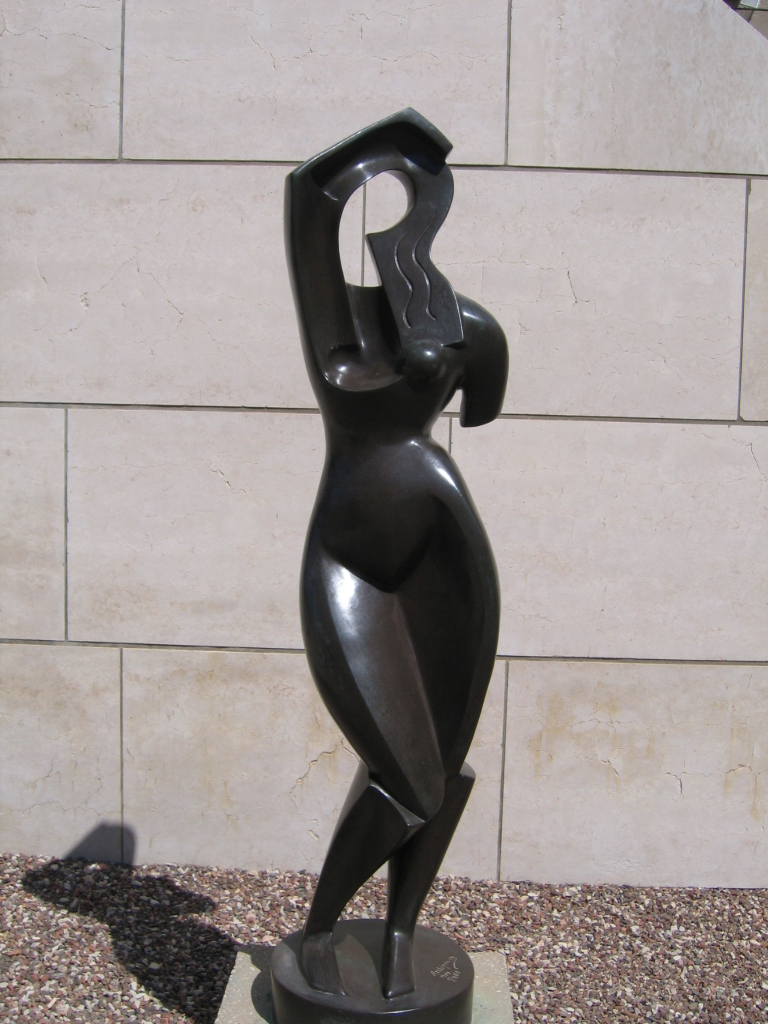
Woman combing her hair, 1914, bronze, Israel Museum, Jerusalem

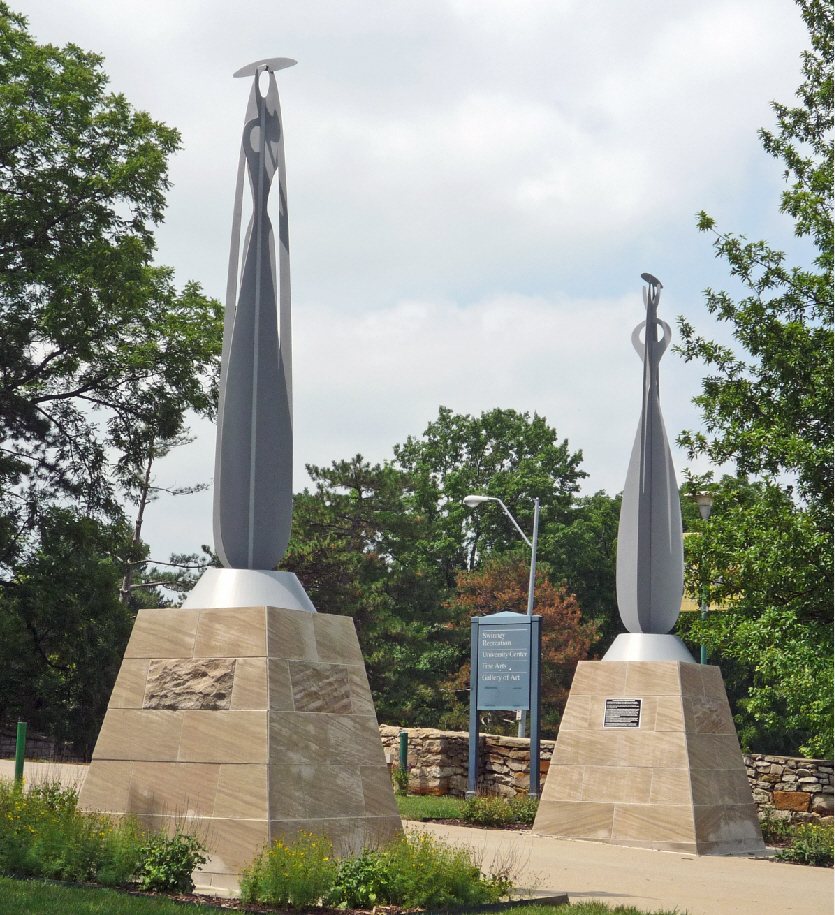
Gateway Sculptures, 1950, painted steel, University of Missouri–Kansas City.

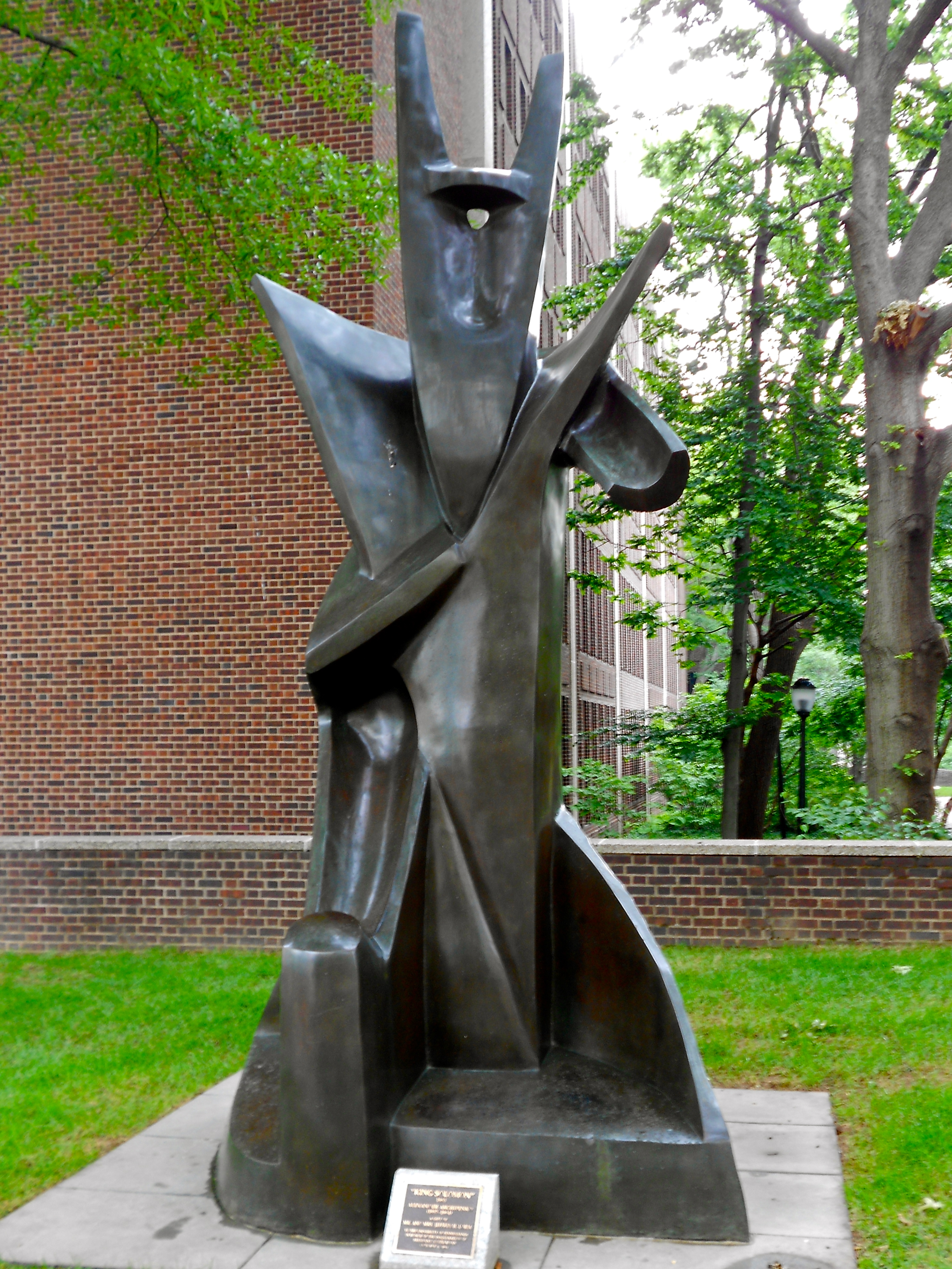
King Solomon on the University of Pennsylvania campus

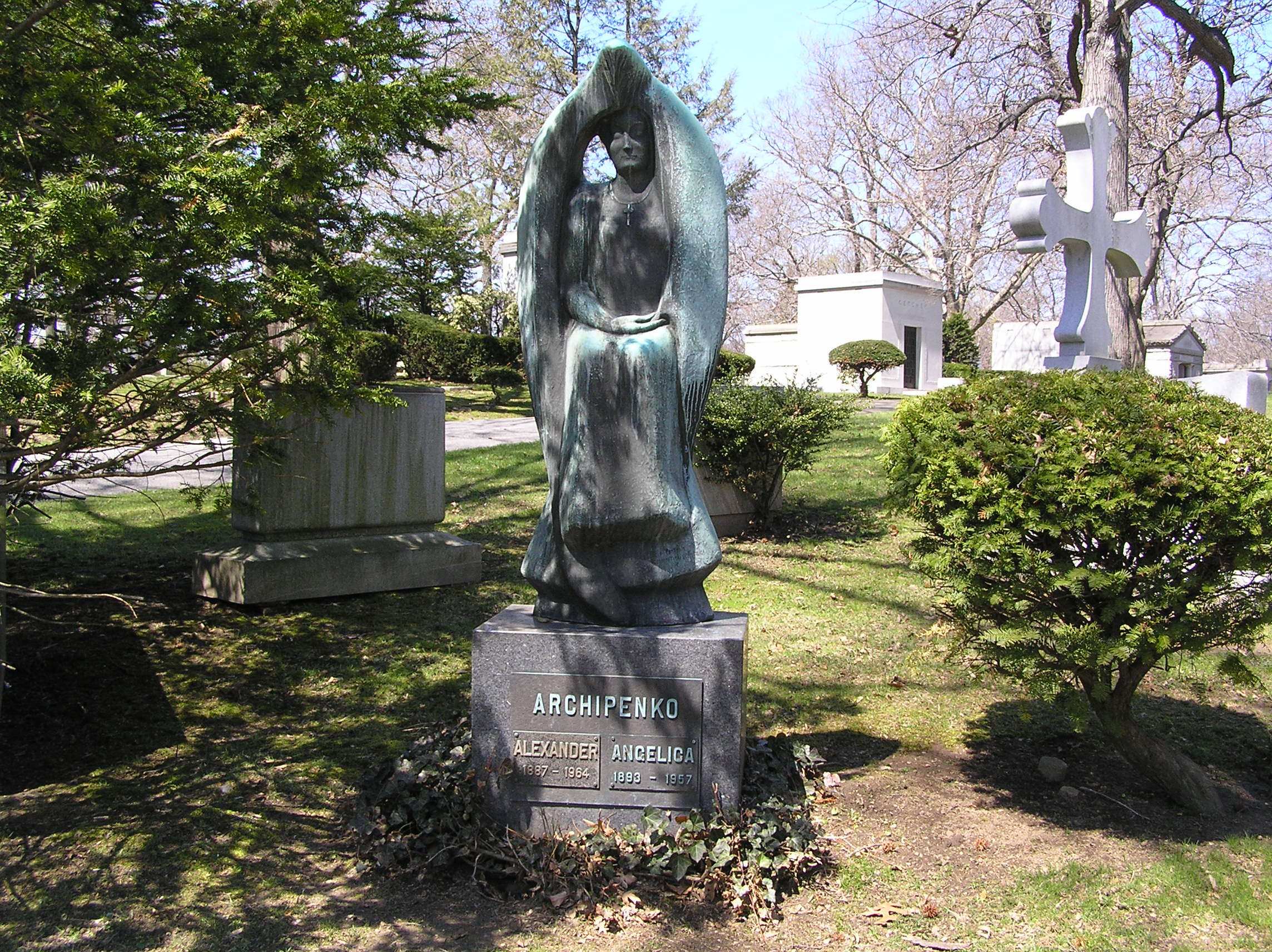
The gravesite of Alexander Archipenko in Woodlawn Cemetery, Bronx, NY

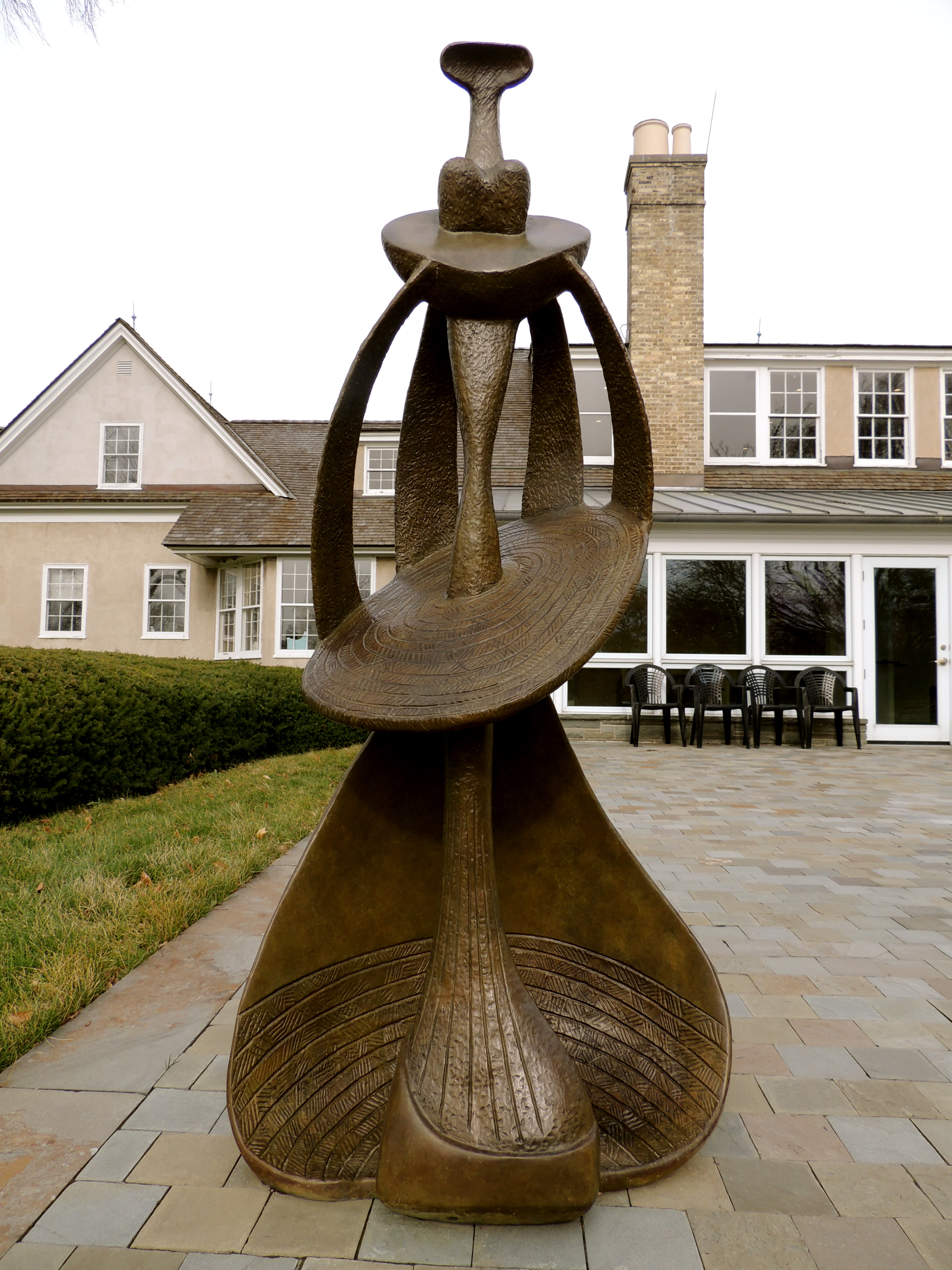
Queen of Sheba, 1961, in the Lynden Sculpture Garden
