= Woodland Cemetery =

Woodland Cemetery may refer to:

- Woodland cemetery, a type of cemetery

or it may refer to specific places:

in Sweden

- Skogskyrkogården (The Woodland Cemetery) in Stockholm, Sweden

in the United States (by state)

- Woodland Cemetery (Quincy, Illinois), listed on the National Register of Historic Places (NRHP)
- Woodland Cemetery (Des Moines, Iowa)
- Woodland Cemetery (Jackson, Michigan)
- Woodland Cemetery (Monroe, Michigan)
- Woodland Cemetery (Newark, New Jersey)
- Woodland Cemetery (Staten Island, New York), in Grymes Hill, Staten Island
- Woodland Cemetery (Cleveland), Ohio, listed on the NRHP
- Woodland Cemetery and Arboretum, Dayton, Ohio, listed on the NRHP
- Woodlands Cemetery, Philadelphia, Pennsylvania
- Woodland Cemetery (Richmond, Virginia), a historically African American cemetery

== See also ==
- Waldfriedhof (disambiguation)
- Woodlawn Cemetery (disambiguation)
