= Stanislav Skubashevskyi =

Ukrainian politician (born 1949)

- Станіслав Скубашевський
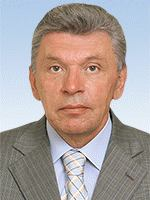
- An official photo of him from 2012.

People's Deputy of Ukraine
- In office 12 December 2012 – 27 November 2014
- Constituency: Party of Regions, No. 14
- In office 23 November 2007 – 12 March 2010 (Note: Early voluntary resignation of mandate to serve in a governmental office.)
- Constituency: Party of Regions, No. 118
- In office 25 May 2006 – 23 November 2007
- Constituency: Party of Regions, No. 95

Personal details
- Born: Stanislav Valerianovich Skubashevskyi; 30 May 1949 (age 77) Romanivka (Kamianets-Podilskyi Raion), Ukrainian SSR, Soviet Union
- Party: Liberal Party of Ukraine (1995-2002); Party of Regions (2001-2014)
- Other political affiliations: Communist Party of the Soviet Union
- Education: Donetsk National Technical University (1976)

Stanislav Valerianovich Skubashevskyi (Ukrainian: Станіслав Валеріанович Скубашевський; born 30 May 1949) is a Ukrainian politician and civil servant who served as a People's Deputy of Ukraine in the Verkhovna Rada from 2006 to 2010 and again from 2012 to 2014 with the Party of Regions. Prior to this, he was a longtime figure in executive and political work in Ukraine, from 1973 to 2006 and from 2010 to 2012, across both the Verkhovna Rada, the government, and Donetsk Oblast.

== Early life ==
Skubashevskyi was born on 30 May 1949 in the village of Romanivka (Kamianets-Podilskyi Raion), which was then part of the Ukrainian SSR in the Soviet Union. He is ethnically Ukrainian and the son of Valerian Antonovich and Viktoria Stanislavivna. After graduating from secondary school, he immediately entered the workforce in 1966, becoming a worker at the Donetsk branch of "Giprograd" until 1968. He then left the enterprise to briefly work as a carpenter in the repair and mechanical workshop of the Donetsk Precision Machinery Plant, before leaving to do his mandatory military service in the Soviet Army until 1970. Upon returning to Ukraine, he became a secretary of the Komsomol at Technical University No. 51, a position he held until 1973. Later, in 1976, he graduated from the Donetsk National Technical University within the Faculty of Mechanics with a specialisation as a mechanical engineer for technical equipment in ferrous metallurgy plants.

== Political career ==
=== 1973-1990: Communist era career ===
While still a student, Skubashevskyi began his political career in 1973 when he was appointed initially as Head of the Organisations Department of the Komsomol in Donetsk, and was later also promoted to Second Secretary of the Voroshylovskyi District of Donetsk for the Komsomol. He held these positions until 1977, after he graduated from university, when he became an instructor of the organisation department of the Donetsk City Committee until 1980. Skubashevskyi was then moved to become Head of the Organisational Department of the Budonnivskyi District of Donetsk, a position he held for another two years. He then briefly left party work between August of 1972 and April of 1983 to become Deputy Head of the Smelting Shop and later Deputy Chief Engineer for Occupational Safety at "Donetskvtorcolormetal". Upon returning to party work in April 1983, he was appointed Second Secretary of the Budonnivskyi District. He was later promoted to First Secretary of the Budonnivskyi District, a position he held up until September 1990.

=== 1990-2006: Early career in Donetsk and consulting ===
In September 1990, Skubashevskyi was finally appointed Chairman of the Budonnivskyi District, a position he held even after the collapse of the Soviet Union, until August 1994. He left the position in August 1994 when he was appointed Deputy Chairman for Executive Affairs of the Donetsk Oblast Council. Skubashevskyi stayed there for only a year until he was promoted to Deputy Chairman of the Donetsk Oblast State Administration, but he left that position too in August 1996. While in the position, he joined the Liberal Party of Ukraine in 1995 and was later appointed to its political council to deal with healthcare issues. He then briefly left politics again until September, as he was appointed director of production for the RaDon company in Donetsk.> Skubashevskyi returned to politics shortly thereafter in October 1996, when he was made a consultant to a People's Deputy of Ukraine and the Secretariat of the Verkhovna Rada, both volunteer positions. In May 1998, he was promoted Deputy Head of the Secretariat, and in July 1998, he was then promoted again to Head of the Secretariat. He left the Verkhovna Rada consulting positions in November 1999 when he became Chief of Staff to the Donetsk Oblast State Administration until 2001, when he became joint Deputy Chairman and Chief of Staff. In 2001, he formally joined the Party of Regions.

Shortly after Viktor Yanukovych was appointed Prime Minister of Ukraine in 2002, Skubashevskyi was appointed as his head of office. In the newspaper Tyzhden, Skubashevskyi was said to have been a loyal and close friend of Yanukovych, which is why he chose him. He was eventually dismissed from the post in February 2005 after Yulia Tymoshenko became the acting prime minister. Skubashevskyi then left for the private sector briefly, becoming deputy general director of the insurance company "Classic Insurance".

=== 2006-2010: First time in the Verkhovna Rada ===
During the 2006 Ukrainian parliamentary elections, Skubashevskyi was elected to the Verkhovna Rada through the party list of the Party of Regions, which he was placed at No. 95. Upon being elected to the Rada, he joined the Party of Regions faction and became a member of the Committee on Rules of Procedure and Parliamentary Ethics. After the 2006 Rada, the 5th one, dissolved early and the snap 2007 Ukrainian parliamentary elections, he re-ran on the party list with the Party of Regions. This time, he was placed lower at No. 118, but was still elected. After again joining the Rada, he joined the Party of Regions faction and became a member of the Committee on Rules of Procedure and Parliamentary Ethics again. He resigned early from office on 12 March 2010 due to Ukraine forbidding dual mandates.

=== 2010-2012: In civil government offices ===
In February 2010, Skubashevskyi was appointed Deputy Head Director of the Main Directorate for Regional and Personnel Policy of Ukraine and Deputy Head of the Office of the President of Ukraine. His main tasks during this time were vetting and approving appointments to high government positions and reforming the civil service offices. After a year, in April 2011, Yanukovych eventually reshuffled his cabinet and advisers. After this, Skubashevskyi was only appointed as Deputy Head of the Office of the President of Ukraine. He was eventually fired after another personnel purge by Yanukovych alongside Hanna Herman in November 2012 in connection with him entering parliament again.

=== 2012-2014: Second time in the Verkhovna Rada ===
In 2012, during the 2012 Ukrainian parliamentary elections, Skubashevskyi ran for re-election to the Verkhovna Rada with the party list of the Party of Regions. This time, he was placed much higher on the list at No. 14. After he was successfully elected, he joined the Party of Regions faction again and, like the previous two convocations, also became a member of the Committee on Regulations and Parliamentary Ethics. While serving in the Rada, he became an adviser to the president on a voluntary basis from 2013 to 2014. He did not run in the snap 2014 Ukrainian parliamentary elections, and retired from politics.

== Personal life ==
He is married to Galina Mikhailovna, a pensioner. They have two daughters: Olga, born in 1971, an associate professor at the National Pedagogical Drahomanov University in Kyiv, and Tetiana, born in 1979, a director of academic affairs at Osvita in Kyiv.

=== Legal issues ===
In 2015, it was reported that the Prosecutor General's Office of Ukraine had notified Skubashevskyi of suspicion of committing crimes and was thus put on the wanted list of Ukraine. The notification came as part of investigations into the so-called "laws on dictatorship". In 2018, he was included in a list of figures, according to the former head of Paul Manafort's office in Kyiv, Konstantin Kilimnik, as having been a regular participant in meetings between Yanukovych's team and Manafort's team.

== Honours and awards ==
Skubashevskyi has been awarded the following honours and awards:

- Order of Merit, III degree (1999)
- Honored Economist of Ukraine (2003)
- Certified as "Civil Servant", II degree (2003)
- Honorary Diploma of the Cabinet of Ministers of Ukraine (2004)
