= Hans Grässel =

German architect

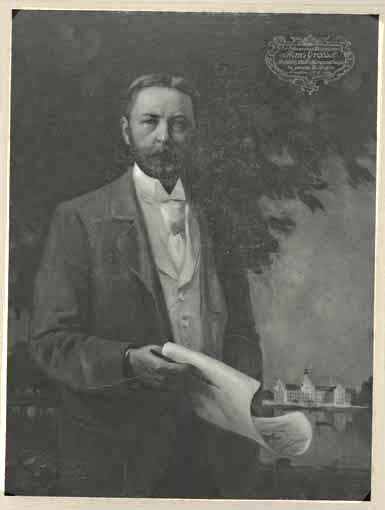
Hans Grässel.

Hans Grässel (August 8, 1860 – March 10 or 11, 1939) was a German architect. Grässel studied and performed almost his entire career in Munich, and as the council architect of the city he created a series of cemeteries of which Munich Waldfriedhof (Munich woodlands cemetery), opened in 1907, is well known for being the first woodland cemetery. Grässel also wrote a pamphlet on cemetery design, Über Friedhofanlagen und Grabdenkmale (1913). In 1914, he was given the order Pour le Mérite.
