= Waldfriedhof =

Waldfriedhof is German for woodland cemetery. Cemeteries called Waldfriedhof include

- Munich Waldfriedhof, Munich
- Waldfriedhof Dahlem, Berlin
- Waldfriedhof Zehlendorf, Berlin
- Waldfriedhof Stuttgart

== See also ==
- Woodland Cemetery (disambiguation)
