= Maria Protsenko =

Soviet and Ukrainian architect

- Марія Проценко
- Born: February 23, 1946 (age 80); China
- Other names: Mu Lan
- Occupation: Architect
- Employer: Dipromisto
- Spouse: Viktor Protsenko (died 2005)

Maria Volodymyrivna Protsenko (Ukrainian: Марія Володимирівна Проценко, born 23 February 1946) is a Ukrainian architect known for her role as the chief architect for Pripyat during the Chornobyl disaster.

== Early life ==
Protsenko was born to Sino-Russian parents in China, and her Chinese birth name is Mu Lan. Her father, Xu Xiang Shui (nicknamed Volodya), became addicted to opium after the deaths of her older brothers to diphtheria. Protsenko's mother left him and, along with Protsenko, moved to Kazakhstan, where Protsenko studied in the Institute of Roads and Transport in Ust-Kamenogorsk. In Kazakhstan, she met and married Viktor Protsenko, a Ukrainian from Poltava. Towards the end of the 1970s, the couple moved to Ukraine, eventually settling in Pripyat in 1978.

== Career ==
=== Architectural career at Pripyat ===
In 1979, Protsenko became the chief architect for Pripyat, though she was barred from joining the Communist Party because of her Chinese birth. Working under Dipromisto, she supervised the city's expansion. During the 1986 Chernobyl disaster, her knowledge and her access to city maps put her in charge of the city's evacuation. She was one of the last people to leave Pripyat. After its evacuation, she worked with the KGB to seal off the city.

=== Later life and career ===
In 1991, she fell ill to paraparesis (weakness of the legs). Her husband Viktor died in 2005. The deaths of her husband, and also her son, was attributed to Chernobyl by Protsenko's daughter Natalia. As of 2019, Protsenko is teaching art, design and architecture at the Art Institute for Decorative Modelling and Design in Kyiv.

In November 2021, a crowdfunding campaign was initiated for her medical expenses related to gastric and gallbladder tumor. On April 3, 2022, Maria appeared in a YouTube video from Yes Theory. The hosts met up with her in a refugee center in Poland, following her and her family’s escape from Ukraine during the 2022 Russian Invasion of Ukraine. During the interview, she lamented the war, and urged for peace. In an Instagram post, Yes Theory stated that Protsenko and her daughter made it safely to Germany.
