= Eugene Archipenko =

Ukrainian politician, agronomist, and beekeeper

Eugene Porfirovych Archipenko (Ukrainian: Євген Порфирович Архипенко, romanized: Yevhen Porfyrovych Arkhypenko) (1884–1959) was a Ukrainian politician, agronomist, and beekeeper.

Archipenko was born in Kaharlyk in the Russian Empire to Porfiry Antonowych Archipenko and Poroskowia Vassylivna Machowa. He was the older brother to sculptor Alexander Archipenko. In his young adulthood, Eugene Archipenko was employed as a beekeeper and from 1906 to 1909 published the periodical Українське бджільництво ("Ukrainian Beekeeper"). Archipenko taught agronomy at St Vladimir University in Kyiv and published a number of textbooks on agronomy and beekeeping.

From 1919 to 1920 Archipenko was a minister of Agrarian Affairs in the Council of People's Ministers of the Ukrainian People's Republic. In 1921, he was forced into exile. He lived in Germany from 1944 and died in Dornstadt, West Germany. His large archive is housed at Columbia University in New York.

He is the author of textbooks on beekeeping and scientific works on heraldry. Bytynsky and others. Drawings of coats of arms were sometimes made by the famous painter V. Krychevsky. A few years before his death he started publishing the magazine "Peasant of Ukraine"
