= Vasyl Orenchuk =

Ukrainian diplomat, politician, publicist and lawyer

Vasyl Yakovych Orenchuk
- Василь Якович Оренчук
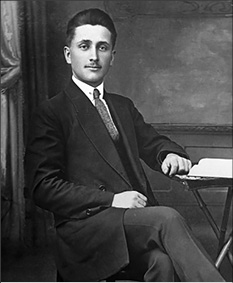
- Orenchuk, c. 1919

Consul of the Ukrainian State and the People's Republic of Ukraine to the Weimar Republic in Munich
- In office 15 November 1918 – 21 December 1922

Personal details
- Born: 13 January 1890 Stoyaniv, Galicia, Austria-Hungary
- Died: 9 March 1958 (aged 68) Munich, Bavaria, West Germany
- Resting place: Munich Waldfriedhof
- Education: University of Vienna

Vasyl Yakovych Orenchuk (Ukrainian: Василь Якович Оренчук; 13 January 1890 – 9 March 1958) was a Ukrainian diplomat, politician, publicist, and lawyer. He served as a consul of the Ukrainian State and the Ukrainian People's Republic in Munich, Germany from 1918 to 1922. He is known as the last consul of the Ukrainian People's Republic.

== Career ==
On 15 November 1918, Vasyl Orenchuk, who was the deputy director of the General Department of the Ministry of Foreign Affairs of the Ukrainian State, was appointed Consul of the Ukrainian State in Munich. During his period as consul, Orenchuk oversaw trade traffic between Bavaria and Ukraine, provided consular assistance to Ukrainian nationals living in the region, and assisted in the dissemination of true information about Ukraine, countering false information.

After meeting with the Bavarian Prime Minister Kurt Eisner and receiving an exequatur, Orenchuk gained respect and recognition in the consular corps. He actively reported on events in Ukraine and had several publications in the German press.

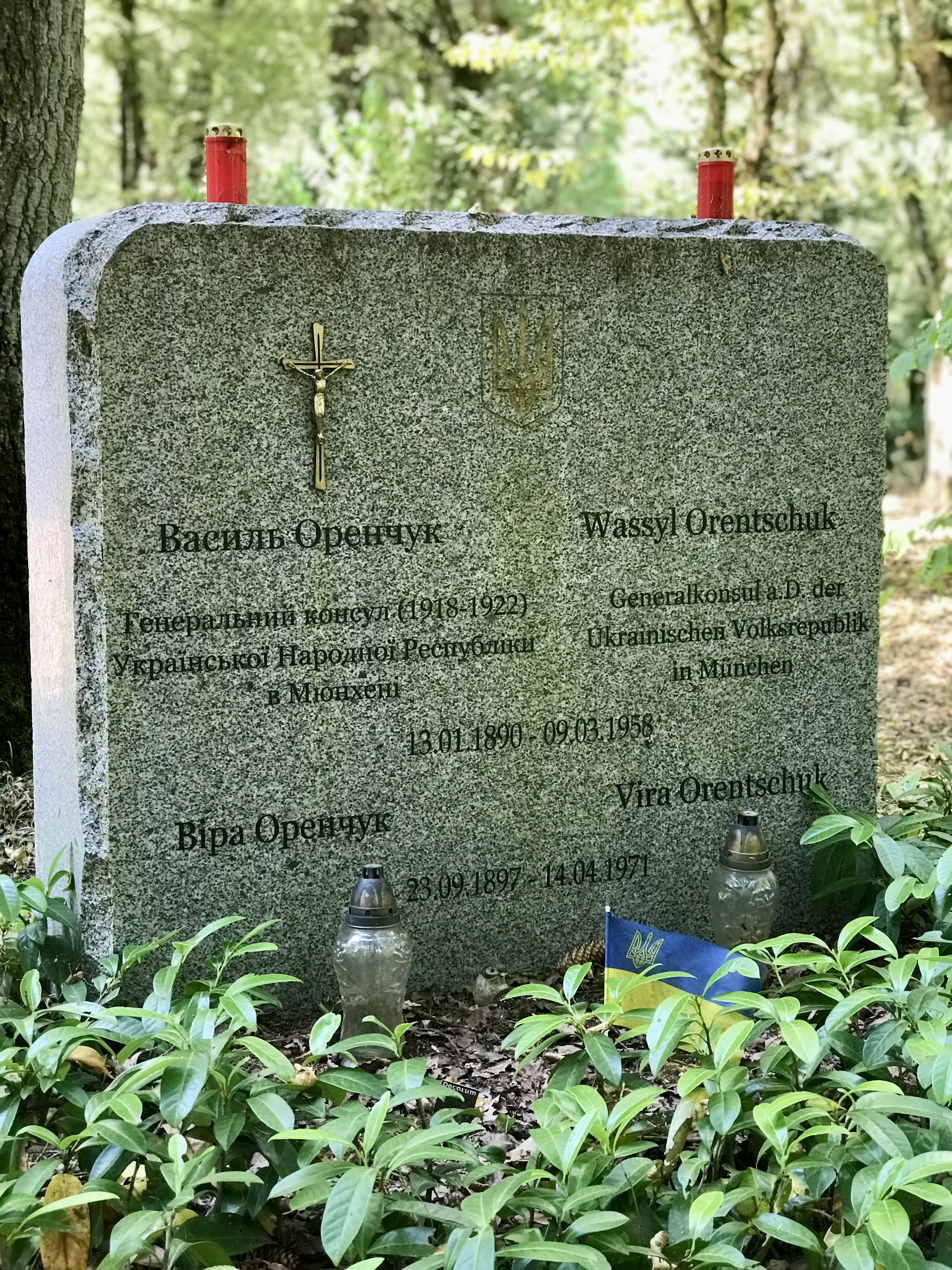
Vasyl Orenchuk's grave in Waldfriedhof, Munich.

On 21 December 1922, the consulate of the Ukrainian People's Republic in Munich ended its activities after Germany signed the Rapallo Treaty, and Vasyl Orenchuk had to resign. After resigning, Orenchuk remained in Munich, living at Lucile-Grahn-Straße 46. A memorial plaque commemorating his service and the consulate has been installed on the building of the former consulate in Munich at Ainmillerstraße 35.
