= Serhiy Svetoslavsky =

Russian painter

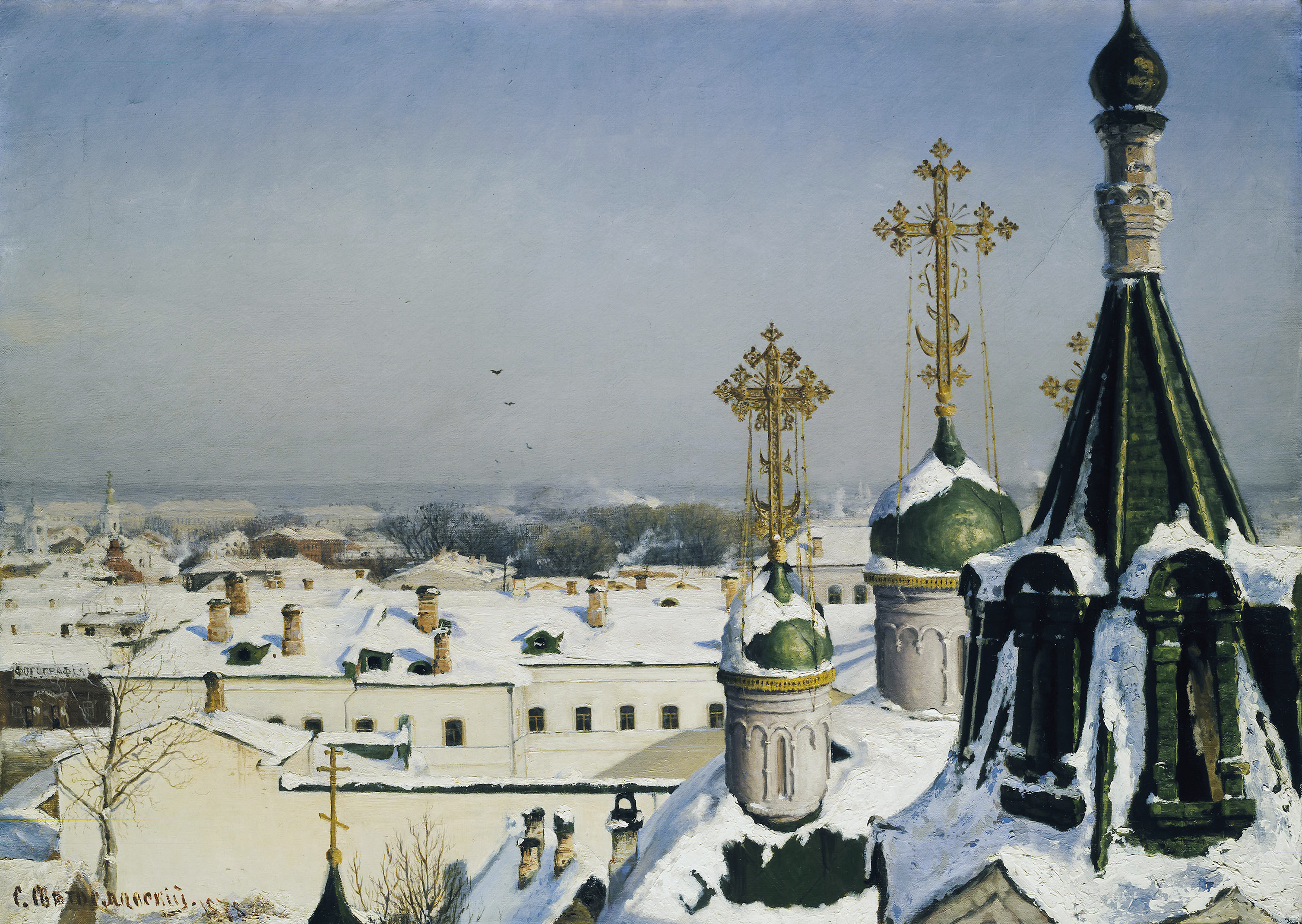
View from a Window of the Moscow School of Painting, Sculpture and Architecture, 1878; Tretyakov Gallery, acquired by Pavel Tretyakov

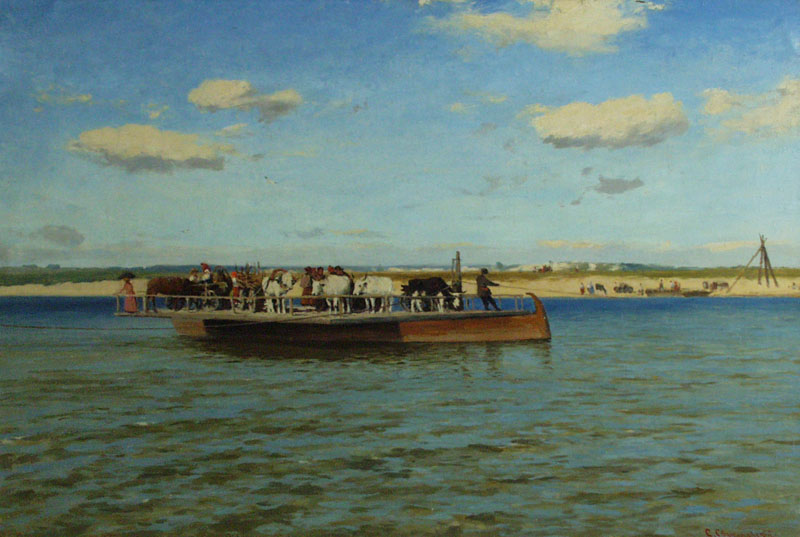
A Ferry Over the Dnieper, 1900s; National Art Museum of Ukraine, Kyiv

Serhiy (Sergey Ivanovich) Svetoslavsky (Russian: Сергей Иванович Светославский, Ukrainian: Сергій Іванович Світославський, 6 October 1857, Kiev — 19 September 1931, Kiev) was a Ukrainian and Russian landscape painter, most notable for his cityscapes.

== Biography ==
Svetoslavsky was born in Kiev. Between 1875 and 1883 he studied painting at the Moscow School of Painting, Sculpture and Architecture with Alexei Savrasov. From 1884, he participated in the exhibitions of the Peredvizhniki group, a realist movement in Russian art, and he formally joined the group in 1891. Pavel Tretyakov, an art collector who later founded the Tretyakov Gallery in Moscow, bought the first painting of Svetoslavsky as early as 1879. In 1889, he made a journey to Central Asia. Between 1890 and 1894 Svetoslavsky was married and lived in Moscow. After his divorce, he settled in Kiev, living with his mother.

The early landscapes of Svetoslavsky, mostly cityscapes, are made in mostly grey and brown colors, as was typical for the Peredvizhniki. After his return to Ukraine, brighter colors started to proliferate. He was interested mostly in cityscapes of Kiev and in rural landscapes of the surroundings of the city. One of his favorite topics was the Dnieper.

Since 1910 Svetoslavsky suffered from an eye disease that eventually forced him to stop painting. From 1911 to 1914 Svetoslavsky was a board member of a committee for erection of monument to Taras Shevchenko in Kiev.

For many years, Svetoslavsky was an active supporter of Kiev Zoo. In 1909 Svetoslavsky persuaded his friend and art supporter Pavel Tretyakov to make a large donation for the newly established Zoo. In 1910 Svetoslavsky sold his estate and organized a large expedition (in which he also participated) to Central Asia to catch animals for Kiev Zoo. Soon a significant part of the Zoo collection were animals caught by Svetoslavsky's expedition.

Viktor Vasnetsov used Svetoslavsky as a model for the image of Moses in the Saint Vladimir's Cathedral in Kiev.
