= Vitsche (organization) =

Berlin-based NGO supporting Ukraine

- Vitsche e.V.
- Formation: May 2022
- Founded at: Berlin, Germany
- Type: NGO
- Registration no.: VR 39580 B
- Legal status: Registered non-profit association
- Purpose: Support for Ukraine
- Location: Berlin, Germany
- Website: vitsche.org

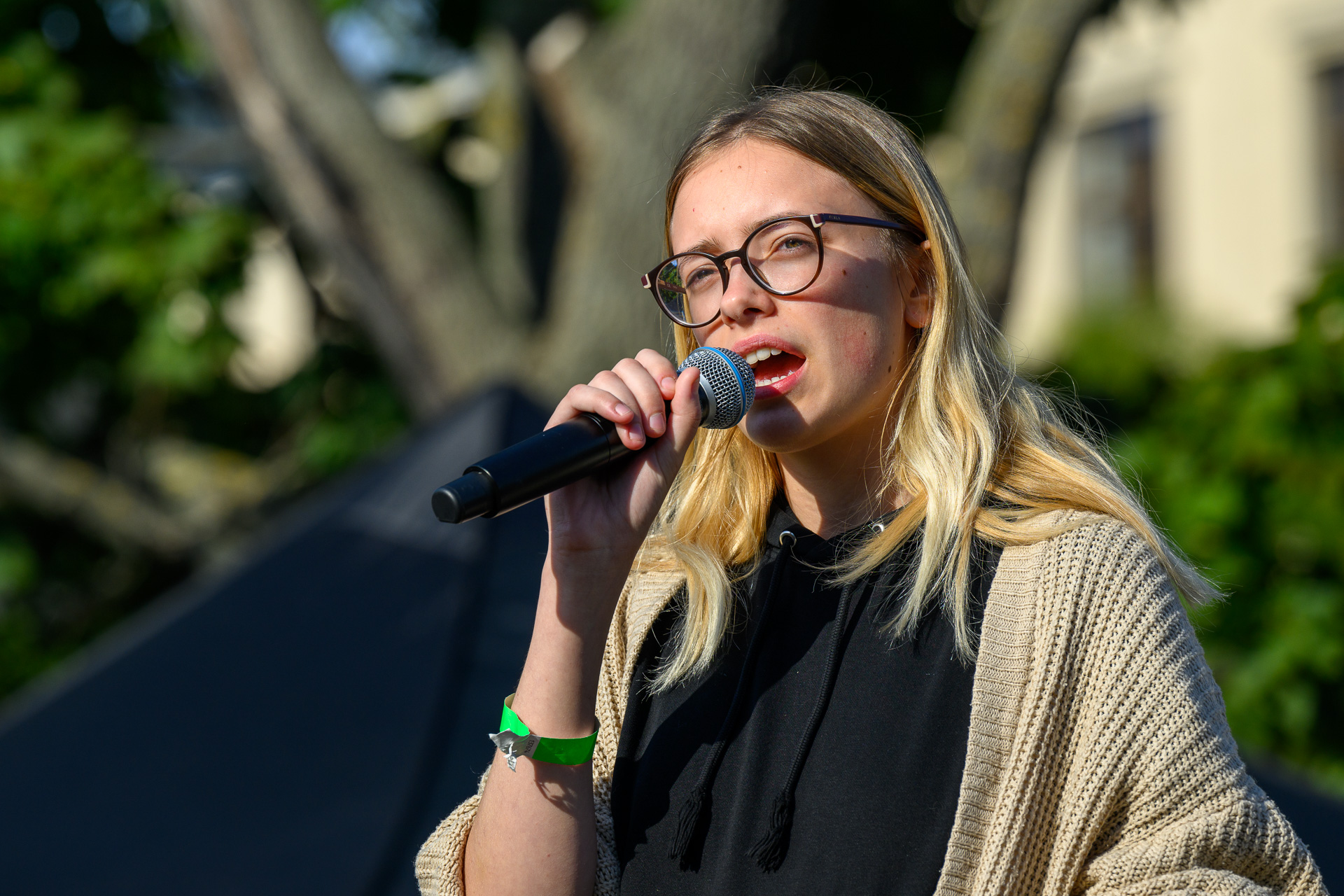
Vlada from Vitsche speaking at the Fridays For Future climate strike, Invalidenpark, Berlin on 23 September 2022

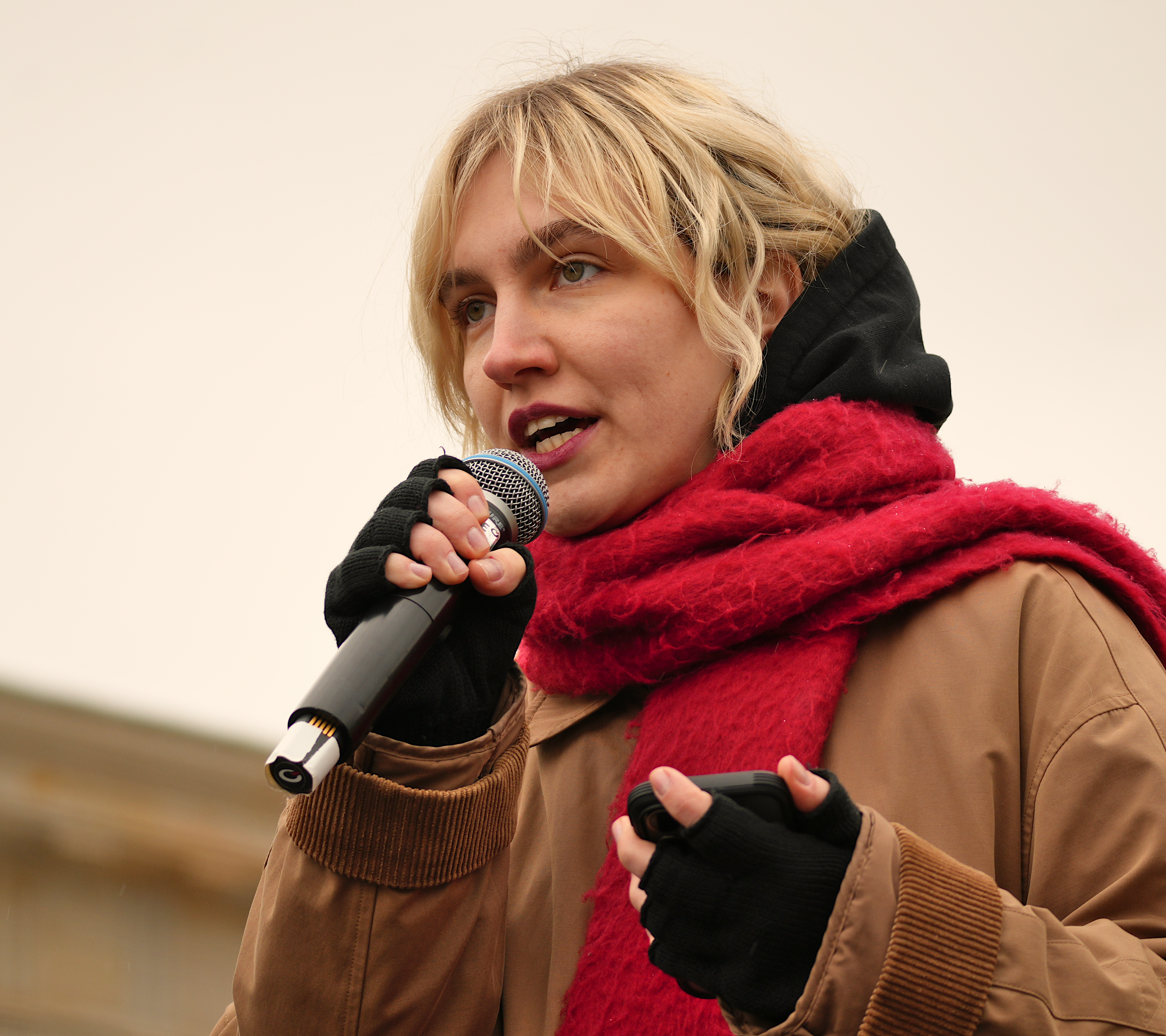
Kateryna Derdiuk from Vitsche speaking at the Fridays for Future Berlin climate strike on 14 February 2025

Vitsche is a registered non-profit association based in Berlin, Germany which advocates for Ukraine during the ongoing Russo-Ukrainian war. Vitsche means "an assembly of free people where important public issues are discussed and decided". (Note: This quote is a translation from German.)

The group organizes protests and cultural and educational gatherings, provides support for Ukrainian refugees, and coordinates humanitarian efforts for Ukraine. Its goal is to amplify Ukrainian voices in Germany.

The organization began through meetings held in the Kreuzberg district of Berlin during January 2022, just prior to the invasion of Ukraine by Russian forces on 24 February 2022. From the outset, Vitsche campaigned for the German government to supply arms to Ukraine — a position which sometimes placed the group at odds with the wider peace movement in the early days of the war.

Vitsche "is mainly made up of young Ukrainians, many of whom have been living in Germany for years, but there are also those who fled to Berlin [following the Russian invasion]".

In February 2024, Vitsche organized its first large public protest in Berlin. In 2025, Vitsche participated in larger rallies organized by established German NGOs. Representatives from Vitsche spoke at the Fridays for Future Berlin climate strike on 14 February 2025. And at the rally organized by Campact at the Brandenburg Gate on 9 March 2025.

== History and methods ==
As indicated, the early meetings took place in bars in Kreuzberg popular with Ukrainians and predated the Russian invasion. Their first protest took place one month before Russian forces invaded Ukraine when tensions were already running high at the border. Vitsche created its Twitter account on 24 February 2022, the day Russia invaded. The organization formally registered as a non‑profit association (German: eingetragener Verein) under German law on 4 May 2022. (Note: See Wikidata item Vitsche (Q116724388) for details.)

The organization necessarily takes precautionary measures. The address of its office is not public and staff and supporters regularly use assumed names when campaigning. The ethos of the organization also changed as it became evident the Russo-Ukrainian war would be drawn out — shifting to a greater emphasis, in 2023, on staying power.

In the first year, Vitsche organized and shipped humanitarian aid directly, but it now leaves that task to partner organizations and raises funds on their behalf instead.

Early on, Vitsche staged small demonstrations near the German parliament, in part to produce material for social media channels. But that strategy changed and Vitsche now tries to focus on individual issues and undertake longer projects.

In 2023, Vitsche appealed a decision by the Berlin authorities to prohibit the use of Ukrainian flags during WWII commemorations scheduled for 8–9 May 2023. The Berlin Administrative Court ruled in favor of Vitsche after a short hearing. Vitsche duly draped huge flags over historical Russian tanks at a Soviet war memorial in Berlin.

Vitsche organized its first large public protest in Berlin on 25 February 2024 to mark the second anniversary of Russia's invasion of Ukraine as part of a series of global actions. Vitsche estimates 10000 people attended.

The election of Donald Trump as United States president in late‑January 2025 created major difficulties for campaigners.

Vitsche seeks to highlight the environmental impact of the Russian invasion, including nature destruction, carbon emissions from the war effort, and nuclear reactor risk.

Eva Yakubovska, board member of Vitsche and curator at the Pilecki Institute Berlin, spoke at a Cafe Kyiv event alongside Ukrainian ambassador Oleksii Makeiev and stressed the need to support Ukraine. The event, held on 11 March 2025, was organized by the Konrad Adenauer Foundation.

On 15 May 2025, about 100 Vitsche supporters demonstrated outside the Berlin State Opera to condemn performances by Russian opera singer Anna Netrebko in light of her ties to the Kremlin.

== See also ==
- Outline of Ukraine
