= Munich Waldfriedhof =

Cemetery in Germany

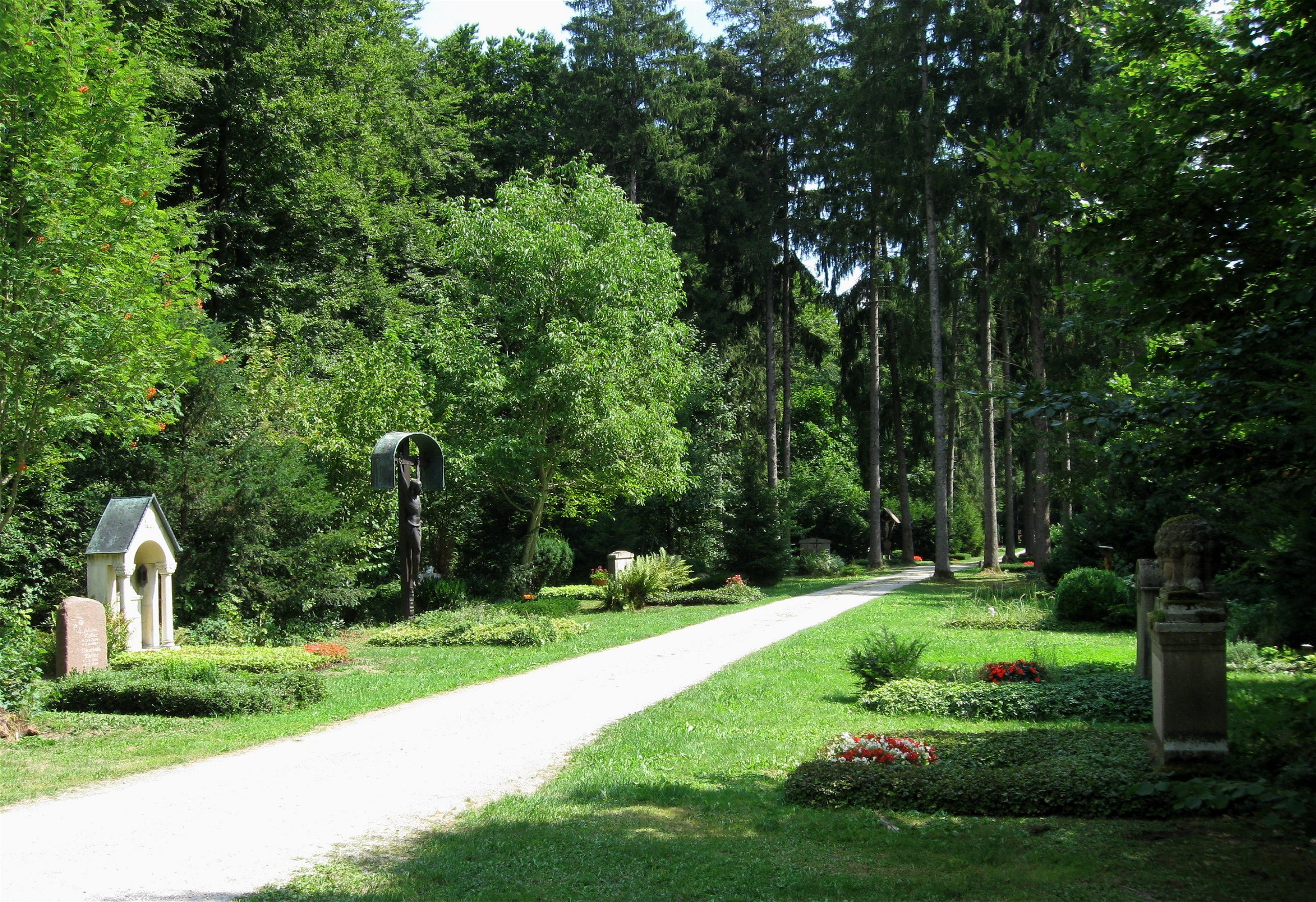
- Interactive map of Munich Waldfriedhof

Details
- Established: 1907
- Location: Munich
- Country: Germany
- Coordinates: 48°06′10″N 11°29′37″E
- Type: Woodland cemetery Public
- No. of graves: 60,000

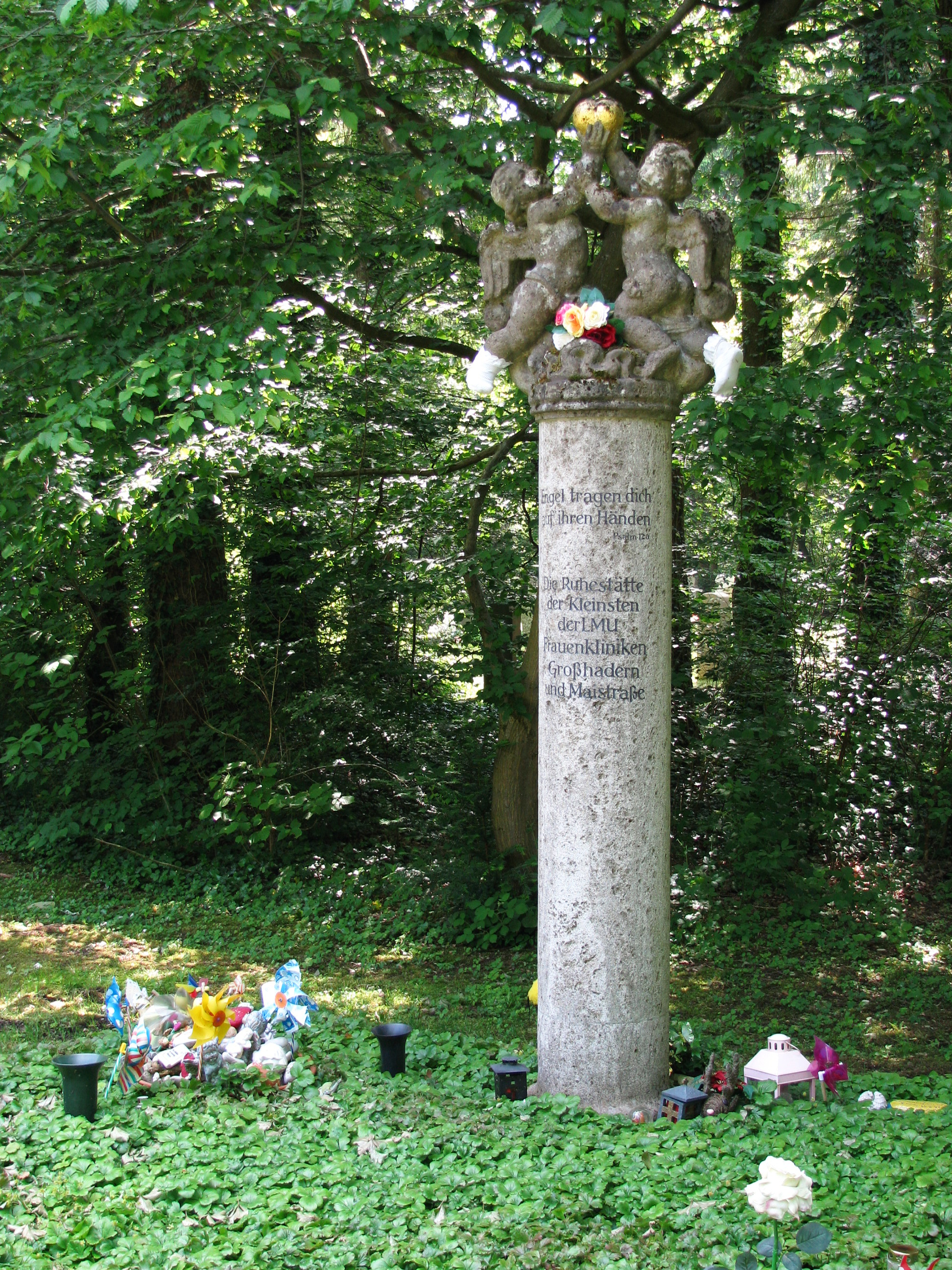
A grave monument in the older part of the cemetery, the Alter Teil

The war cemetery at the Waldfriedhof, where victims of both world wars are buried.

The Munich Waldfriedhof is one of 29 cemeteries of Munich in Bavaria, Germany. It is one of the largest and most famous burial sites of the city, known for its park-like design and tombs of notable personalities. The Waldfriedhof is considered the first woodland cemetery.

== Description ==
The Munich Waldfriedhof is located in the southwest and borders several city districts today. It is separated in two sections, the old part and the new part (German: Alter Teil and Neuer Teil, respectively). It holds almost 60,000 graves. The Waldfriedhof is open every day from 8am and closes between 5pm and 8pm depending on the season. During the warmer months of the year the city arranges guided tours. The cemetery is connected to the public transport system MVV by several bus lines. Access to the graves by car is very limited. The cemetery borders the beginning of the Autobahn A95 in the south as well as other major roads in the north and east.

The cemetery is known for the Italian Military Cemetery (Italian: Cimitero Militare Italiano) in the new part (German: Neuer Teil) with 3,249 graves of Italian soldiers, 1,789 of the First World War and 1,459 of the Second World War. Built in 1922, its purpose was to remember those who died in Germany during both World Wars.

== History ==
The Münchner Waldfriedhof, as it is called in German, was designed by the architect Hans Grässel and opened in 1907. From 1963 to 1966, the cemetery was enlarged by the architect Prof. Ludwig Römer.

The cemetery is one of a series of cemeteries in Munich planned by Grässel at about the same timepoint. The leaders of the city had not been fond of the idea of one huge main cemetery when the old burial sites became too small. Thus Grässel was instructed to plan four new cemeteries, one in each cardinal direction. The Waldfriedhof was created at a time when most cemeteries were designed as city parks or recreational parks. Typical themes of such cemeteries were "the City of the Dead" or "the Paradise Garden". As the new cemeteries were mostly located in the outskirts of cities rather than in churchyards, and the importance of the church was diminishing, they were relatively profane in character. To regain some symbolic strength, Grässel used influences from early Christian and Byzantine architecture in his funeral chapels and other buildings on the cemetery. He also put the burial chapel in the forest, rather than displaying it at the side of the avenue. Grässel kept the trees growing in the area, letting the woods cover tombs in order to create a feeling of connection between nature and death rather than letting the individual monuments be the main feature of the cemetery.

The themes and ideas from the Munich Waldfriedhof became popular in Germany in the upcoming decades and were used in several similar Waldfriedhöfe (woodland cemeteries) elsewhere. The Munich Waldfriedhof was also a very important predecessor of Skogskyrkogården outside Stockholm, a UNESCO World Heritage Site.

== Selection of interred people ==
Notable burials include:

- Hans Ritter von Adam, World War I flying ace
- Stepan Bandera, Ukrainian far-right leader
- Günther Blumentritt, officer in World Wars I and II
- Michael Ende, author (e.g. The Neverending Story)
- Alfons Goppel, Prime Minister of Bavaria
- Emmy Göring and Edda Göring, the second wife of Hermann Göring and their daughter
- Hans Grässel, architect
- Jakob Grimminger, Nazi Party & SS standard-bearer of the "Blutfahne" (The Bloodbanner); his body was relocated to an unmarked grave in Herzebrock-Clarholz
- Paul Hausser, SS-Oberst-Gruppenführer und Generaloberst der Waffen-SS
- Werner Heisenberg, scientist and Nobel prize winner
- Barbara Henneberger, alpine skier
- Paul Heyse, writer and Nobel prize winner
- Kurt Huber, University Professor and member of the White Rose group
- Friedrich Hund, physicist
- Sabine Impekoven, actress
- Josef Kammhuber, World War II and Federal German airforce general
- Carl Krone, founder of the Circus Krone
- Franzl Lang, alpine yodeller
- Carl von Linde, engineer and inventor
- Wilhelm List, World War II field marshal
- Vasyl Orenchuk, Ukrainian diplomat
- Leo Peukert, actor
- Rob Pilatus, model, dancer and singer; member of the musical duo Milli Vanilli
- Albert Reich, painter, graphic designer, draftsman and illustrator
- Leni Riefenstahl, film director
- Josef Rodenstock, optician and founder of the Rodenstock GmbH
- Dietrich von Saucken, World War II General
- Yaroslav Stetsko, Ukrainian politician
- Franz Stuck, Art Nouveau painter
- Alfred von Tirpitz, World War I admiral
- Frank Wedekind, playwright
- Fritz Wunderlich, German lyric tenor
- Eduard Zorn, World War II General

== See also ==
- List of burial places of classical musicians
