= Woodland cemetery =

Burial method

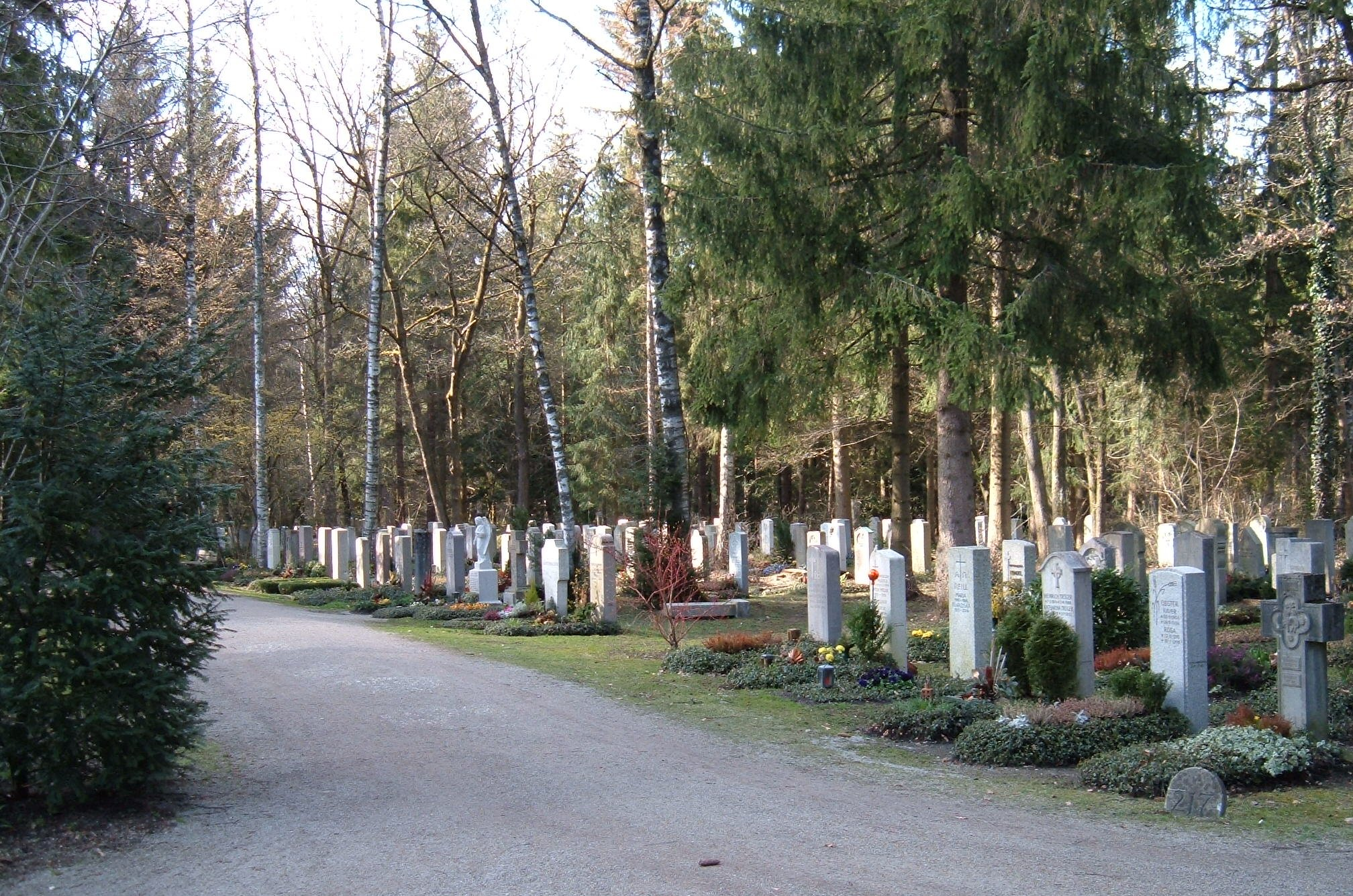
Waldfriedhof München, Germany

A woodland cemetery is a cemetery where the original landscape, with existing trees, is given much influence on the landscape architecture of the cemetery. A woodland cemetery is designed so that the landscape is given a more prominent position, and grave monuments, chapels and other buildings are given less prominent positions. The trees of the cemetery might originally have been a woodland or a tighter forest where a portion of the trees have been removed, and some of the trees might be planted as well.

The best-known woodland cemeteries are the large ones constructed by well-known architects; however, there are also several woodland cemeteries in northernmost Sweden that predate both Skogskyrkogården and the German Waldfriedhof style.

== Notable cemeteries ==
The woodland cemetery in Karesuando in the northernmost municipality of the country, Kiruna Municipality, was consecrated in 1816.

Other notable woodland cemeteries are the Munich Waldfriedhof of 1907 in Germany (often mentioned as the first woodland cemetery) and the World Heritage Site Skogskyrkogården, outside of Stockholm.

In the United States The Woodlands in Philadelphia is an arboretum which was turned into a Victorian-style rural cemetery in 1840. Today it is a National Historic Landmark District.

== Notable woodland burials ==
Avant-garde composer Karlheinz Stockhausen is buried in a woodland cemetery overlooking Kürten, Germany.

== See also ==
- Eco-cemetery
