= Dipromisto =

Ukrainian urban planning organization

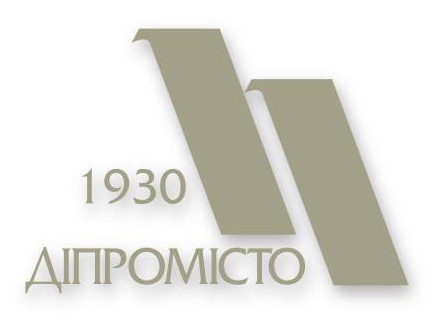
- Formation: September 12, 1930
- Location: Boulevard Lesi Ukrainky, 26, Kyiv, 01133, Ukraine
- Director: Ivan Shpylevskyi, Honoured Architect of Ukraine
- Website: www.dipromisto.gov.ua

DIPROMISTO (Ukrainian: ДІПРОМІСТО) is a research and planning institute in the field of spatial and urban planning in Ukraine. It is a state enterprise within the field of governance of the Ministry of Regional Development, Construction and Housing of Ukraine. It was established on September 12, 1930. Its full name is State Enterprise Y. Bilokon Ukrainian State Scientific-Research Institute of Urban Design "DIPROMISTO".

In Russian language sources it is also known as Giprograd (Russian: Гипроград). During Soviet times, it was a system of planning institutes consisting of the central institute in Kyiv and a range of affiliates in oblasts' centres of USSR. In due time, most of the affiliates separated from the Dipromisto system into separate institutes. Currently the Institute has three affiliates: Ivano-Frankivsk, Rivne, and Volyn affiliates.

== History ==
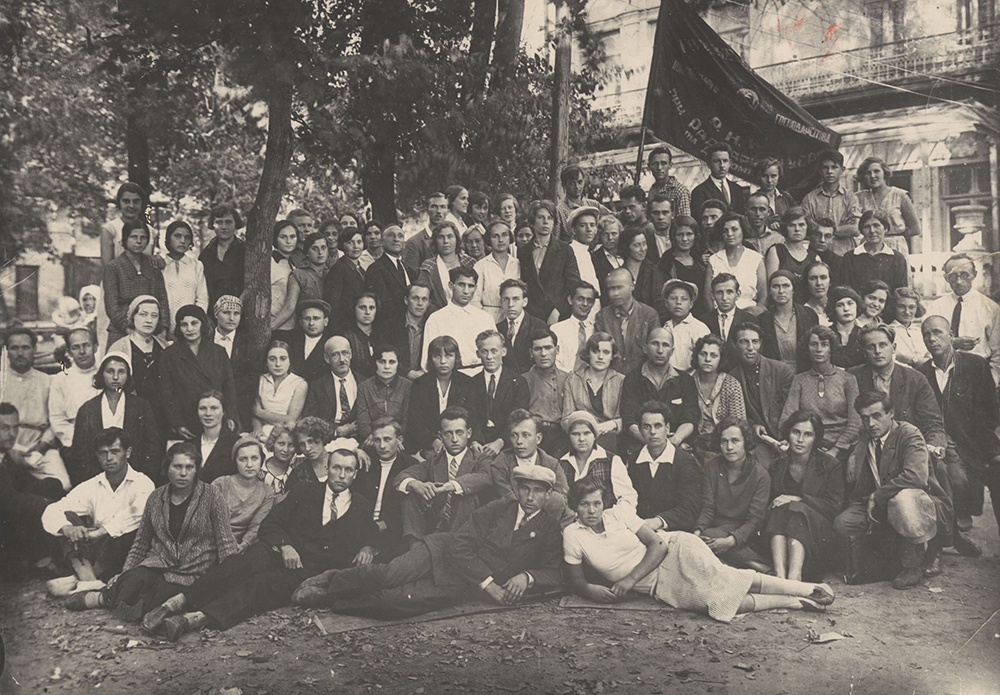
Dipromisto's team in 1933 or 1934.

The Institute "DIPROMISTO" was established on September 12, 1930. According to the Government of Ukrainian SSR Statute, the Institute was assigned the tasks of urban planning, design residential and community buildings, and scientific work in the field of urban planning.

During the pre-war period, Dipromisto produced a number of projects on regional planning including planning of cities and villages, design of community facilities, residential and public buildings, allocation of new industrial development, guidance and control on construction, scientific elaboration of key issues in spatial and urban planning, and experimental and standard design.

During 1943-44, the key task of the Institute was to identify the loss to urban economies caused by war and define top-priority measures to assist the recovery of the cities of Ukrainian SSR.

In the 1950s, the attention of planners turned to verdurization and improvement of cities and villages, and the formation of their architectural view and landscape. In 1962 a new architectural-planning workshop on resort-recreational objects design was created in the Institute. In the 1960-70s a landscape workshop was formed in the Institute in which works on landscape reconstruction of green plantations and natural landscapes organisation have been designed.

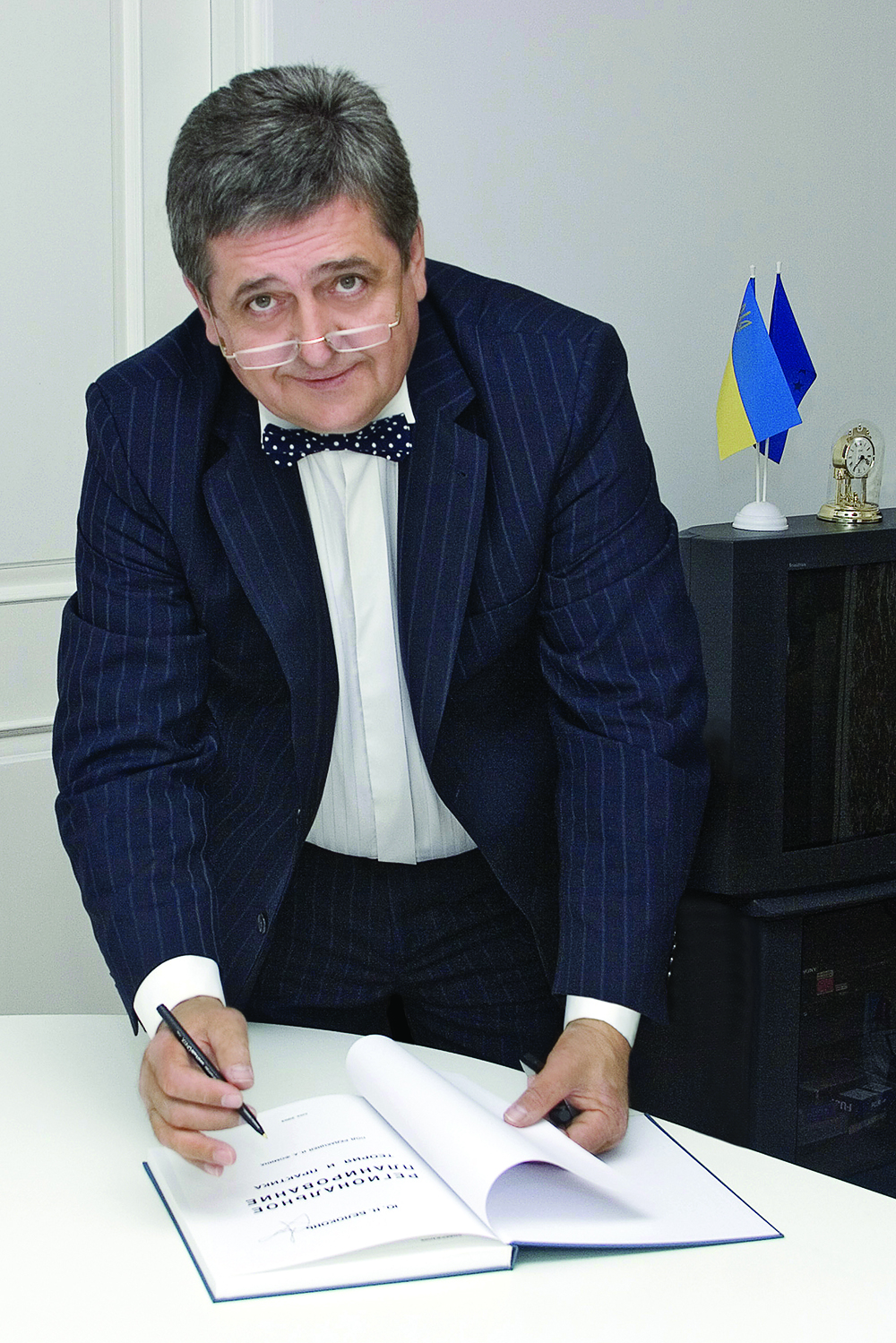
Yurii Mykolayovych Bilokon, Director of the Institute in 1993-2009, People’s Architect of Ukraine

Having started in the late 1960s, the work on schemes of regional planning for 25 Oblasts of Ukrainian SSR lasted until 1989. In 1985 DIPROMISTO started working on the Summary Scheme of Regional Planning of Ukrainian SSR.

Since the beginning of 1990s, work on implementation of geographical information technologies into spatial and urban planning has been carried out in the Institute. In 1991-1993, the experts of DIPROMISTO elaborated geographical information system for the purposes of urban planning – MISTO. By the end of 1995, it became evident that further usage of own software wasn’t enough for the Center and the whole Institute. Consequently, active implementation of software products by ESRI began.

The strengthening of the Institute in independent Ukraine has been overseen by Yurii Mykolaiovych Bilokon, Doctor of Architecture, Professor, People’s Architect of Ukraine. Yurii Bilokon was one of the initiators of spatial planning of cross-border regions and elaborated methodological basis for these works. He oversaw the creation of a scientific-production-educational complex "Arhmistobud" in collaboration with the Department of Urban Planning of Kyiv National University of Construction and Architecture.

In 2009 staff initiated to name the Institute "DIPROMISTO" after Y.M.Bilokon which was adopted by the Order of the Ministry of Regional Development of Ukraine.

== Activity ==
The activity of DIPROMISTO is directed to scientific support of project works in the field of spatial and urban planning and architecture, creating a normative and methodological basis for planning and development of territories, as well as elaboration of spatial and urban planning documentation for settlements, regions and the country as a whole, project documentation on civil construction and landscape architecture, creation and implementation of geographical information decision support systems in the field of spatial and urban planning, including automated systems of urban cadastre, elaboration of land management works, basic and advanced training of experts in spatial and urban planning.

The Institute is a base organisation for scientific and technical activities in construction (Order of the Ministry of Regional Development, Construction and Housing of Ukraine from 3 May 2012 No.190). This entrusts the Institute with functions of scientific, research, normative-methodological and information support to planning and developing of territories and settlements, as well as support to the Standardisation Technical Committee "Planning of territories and settlements" (TK314).

== Works ==
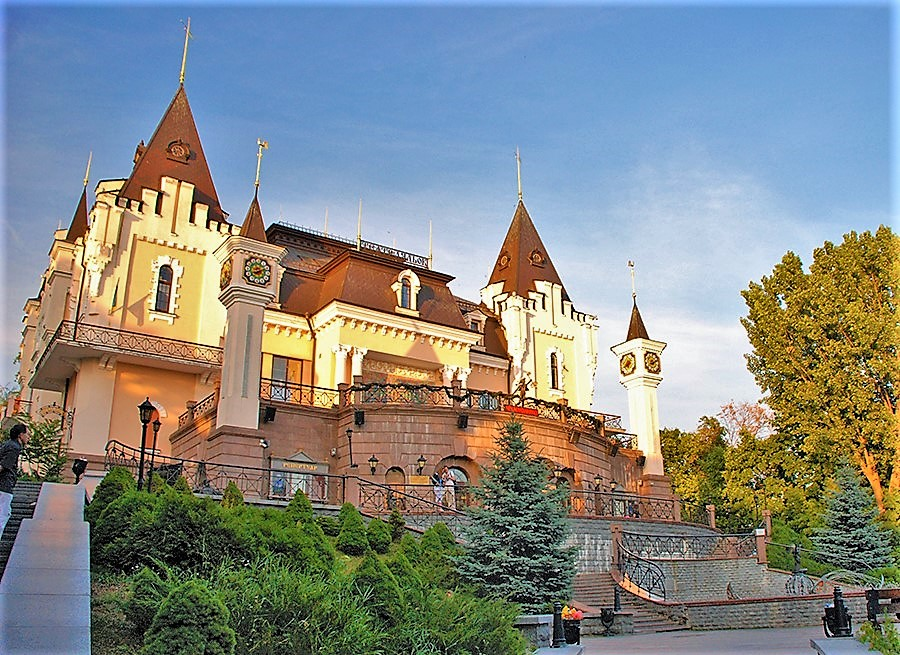
Kyiv Academic Puppet Theatre

DIPROMISTO created the General Scheme of Planning of the Territory of Ukraine (the main document in the field of spatial planning adopted by the Law of Ukraine in 2002) , and monitors its implementation.

DIPROMISTO also created schemes of planning of the territories of the Autonomous Republic of Crimea, oblasts, and raions of Ukraine; complex territorial schemes of nature protection; joint projects on spatial development of the cross-border regions; joint international projects on spatial development; general plans of cities; zoning plans; detailed plans of territories; projects of organisation of territories of nature protected areas; spatial planning substantiation of international transport corridor No.5 passage; and projects on land cost assessment.

The Taras Shevchenko National Academy Theatre of Opera and Ballet in Kyiv and Odesa National Academy Theatre of Opera and Ballet have been reconstructed. The National Complex "Expocentre of Ukraine" in Kyiv, Kyiv National Linguistic University, Kyiv Academic Puppet Theatre, the Embassy of Belarus Republic in Ukraine, and the Irpin building for the Academy of State Tax Service of Ukraine have been built.
