= Vilen Barskyi =

German artist

- Вилен Барский
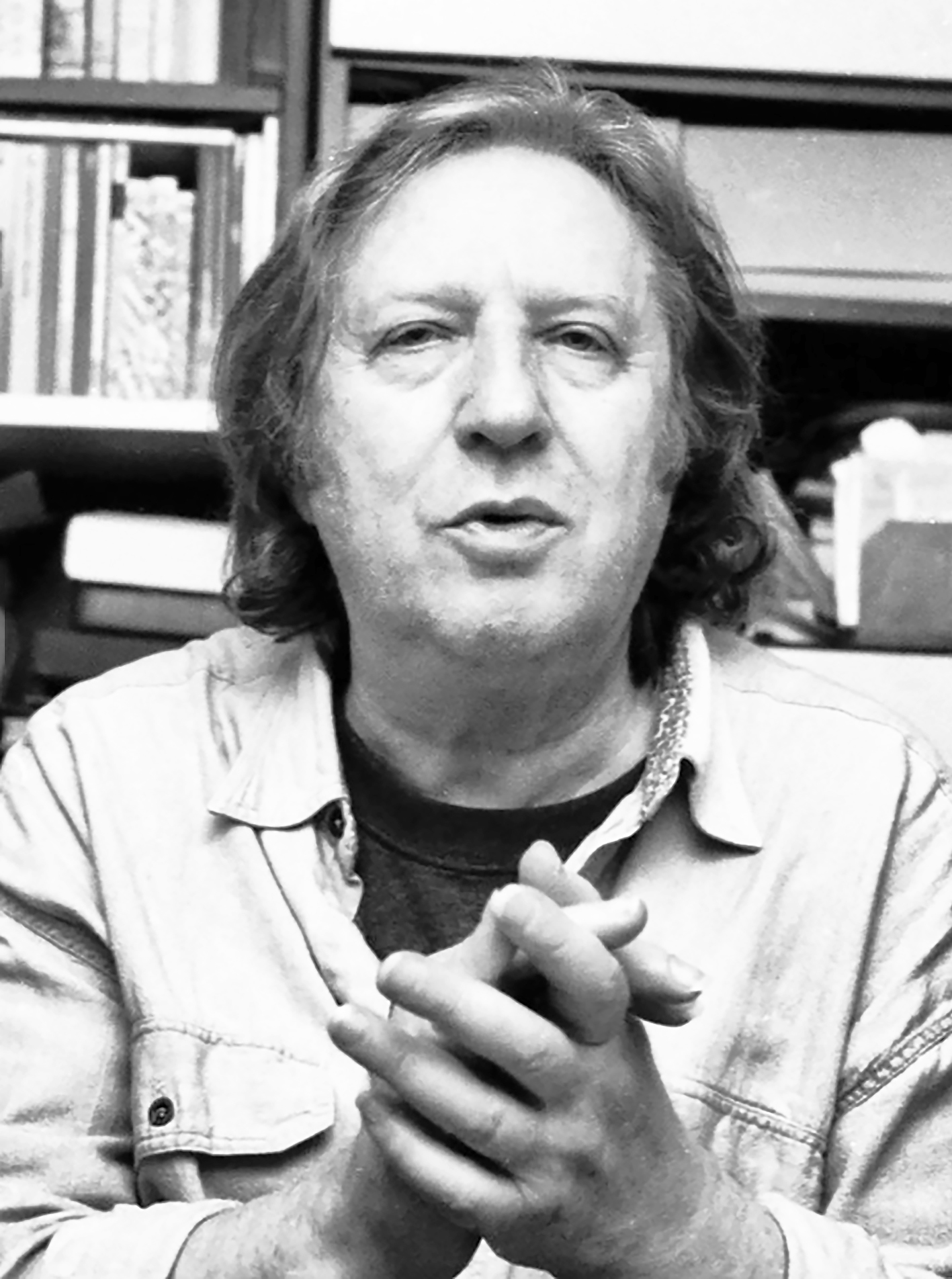
- Barski in 1995, photo by Yuri Kosin
- Born: 27 October 1930; Kyiv, Ukraine
- Died: 24 December 2012 (aged 92); Dortmund, Germany
- Education: Kyiv Art Institute
- Known for: Poetry, painting
- Spouse: Olga Denisova

Vilen Isaakovych Barskyi (27 October 1930 – 24 December 2012) was a Ukrainian Soviet and German painter and graphic artist. He was a member of the Union of Artists of the USSR, Dortmund Group. He was also a Russian-language poet, essayist, and author of experimental works of graphopoetry. He was a prominent representative of postmodernism, conceptualism and underground culture as well as a teacher.

== Biography ==
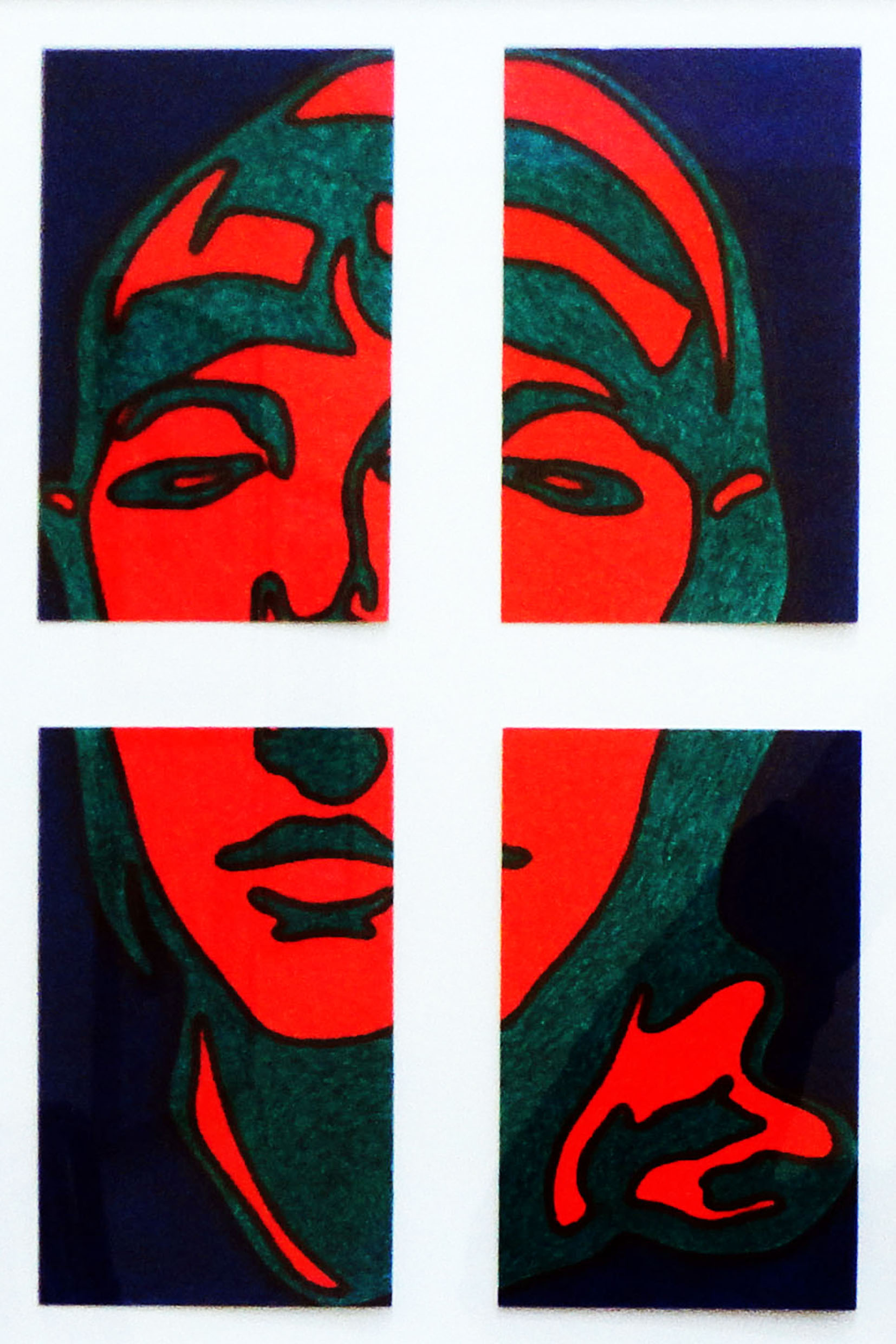
Vilen Barskiy. Elements of a Face. 1970

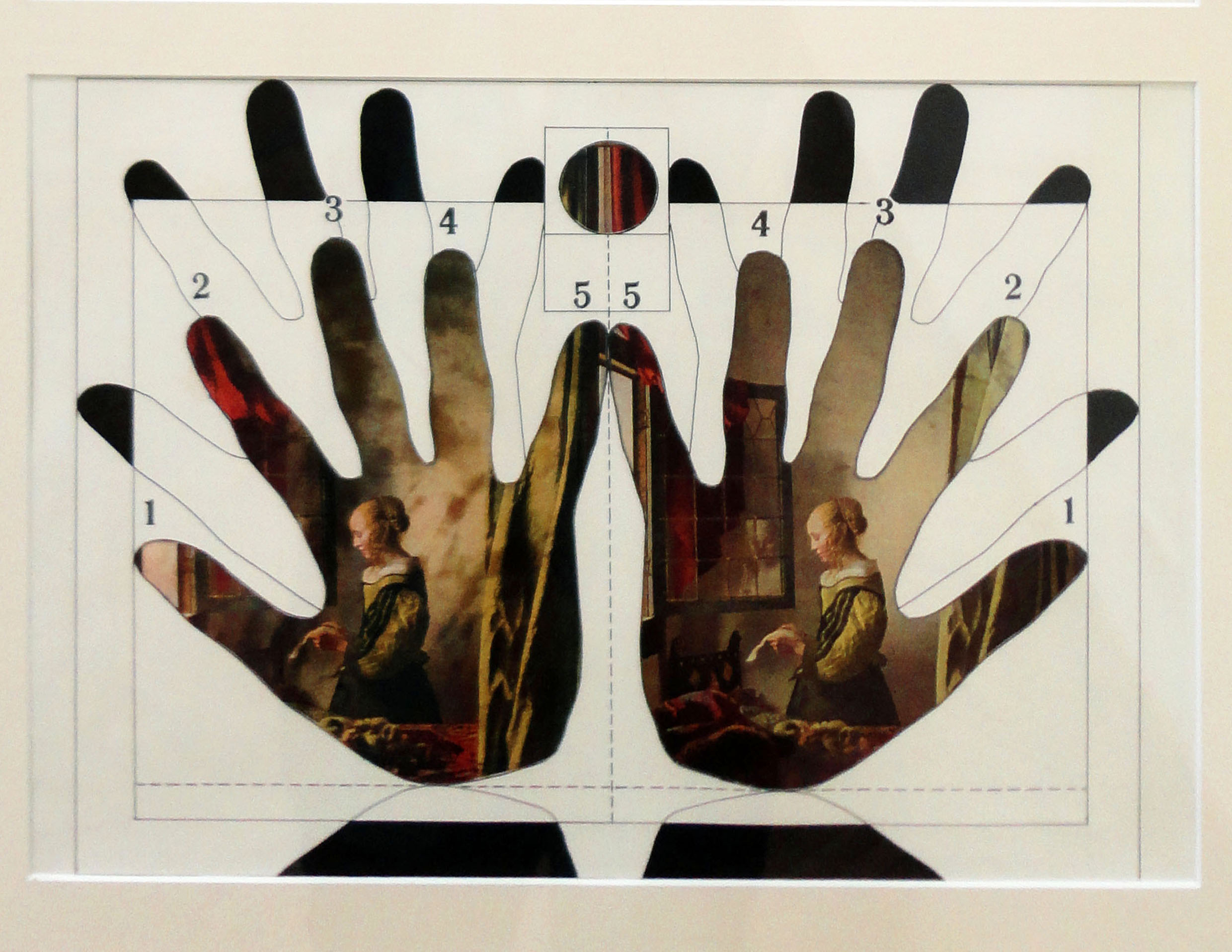
Vilen Barskiy. Collage with Vermeer.1970

Vilen Barsky was born on 27 October 1930 in Kyiv, the capital of Ukrainian Soviet Socialist Republic. His father was an engineer, and his mother was a pharmacist. His childhood memories were closely related to the Botanic garden, since his family lived across from it. During the war, the family was evacuated to Stalingrad, then, before the decisive battle, moved to Sernur (Mari Autonomous Soviet Socialist Republic), and returned to Kyiv after the war.

In 1951, Barsky graduated from the Kyiv Art School (now Shevchenko State Art School) and entered the Kyiv Art Institute.

In 1957, he graduated from the Kyiv Art Institute, Faculty of Painting and Graphics. After graduating from the institute, he began experimenting in the field of fine arts, creating abstract compositions.

Due to his ideologically unbiased position, the artist came under pressure from the Soviet authorities. Thus, in 1959, after a home search, he was taken to the KGB office. As a result, he lost the right to government orders and participation in exhibitions for a long time, sharing the participation of the best representatives of the generation of the sixties.

In 1967, he joined the Union of Artists of the USSR.

In 1981, he left Soviet Kyiv and settled in Dortmund with his wife, the poet Olga Denisova.

He was a talented teacher. Among his students were Vera Veisberg, Olena Golub, Konstyantin Samoilenko, Nicholas Zalevsky, and Yury Kharchenko.

He died in Dortmund on 24 December 2012.

== Art ==
Barskyi's search for and formation of his own path in art was connected with his active interest in the work of outstanding artists in various fields. He listened to the philosophical and aesthetic concept of his senior colleague Valery Lamakh, set out in the "Schemes". He was delighted with the talent of director Sergei Parajanov.

Feeling various influences, Barskyi maintained self-identification. He experimented a lot, looking for new means of artistic expression: there are works made using an airbrush (1965), smoke and fire (1968), and a template of his own hand (1969).

1981— under the pseudonym Victor Belenin, he published six visual poems in the Ark magazine, published in Paris. In the same year, they are shown at the exhibition "L'emigration Russe. L’art en Voyage” at the Trans / form gallery in Paris.

1982 — holds a solo exhibition at the Catholic Academy Schwerte (Germany). A catalogue of Barsky's works created in 1959–1980 is published for the event.

1990s — Barsky's works are published in Ukraine and Russia, in particular in the literary-critical magazine Zoil (1997), the anthology Samizdat Veka (1997), the poetry collection Dom s Chimerami (2000), and others.
