= Ukrainian underground =

20th-century Ukrainian art movement

Ukrainian underground was a movement in Ukraine's Soviet period within Soviet nonconformist art from the late 1950s through the early 1990s. This art form was banned by several totalitarian countries of Eastern Europe and the USSR. It was also known under other names, such as unofficial art, nonconformist, and dissident art. It ended due to the Perestroika reform movement, which led to Ukrainian independence in 1991. After the Soviet Union collapsed, similar counter-cultural processes developed under the names of "alternative" or "marginal" art. The avant-garde ideas of underground art were picked up and developed by the next generation of the Ukrainian New Wave.

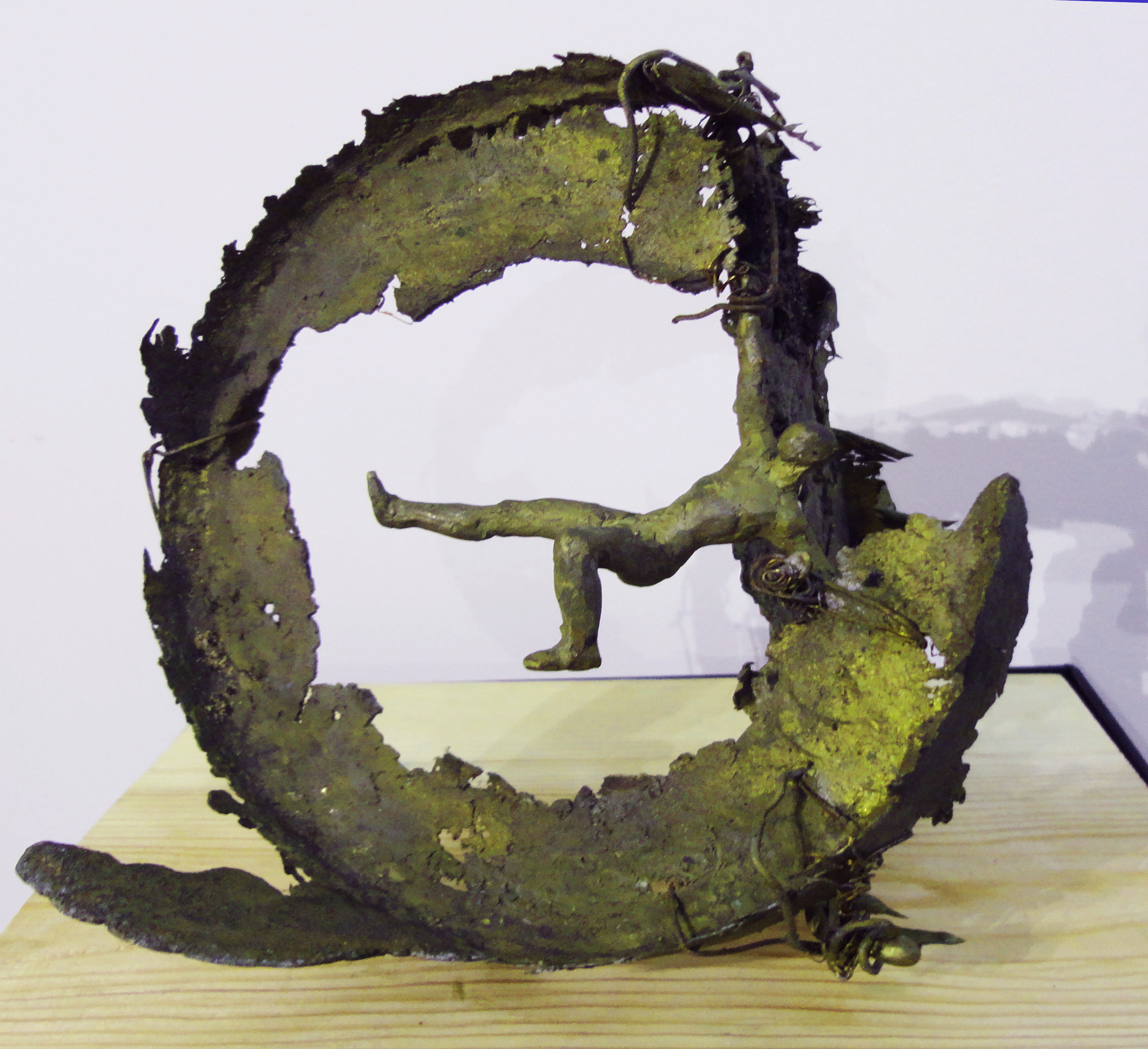
"Man and infinity", object by Ukrainian artist Feodosiy Tetianych, 1980

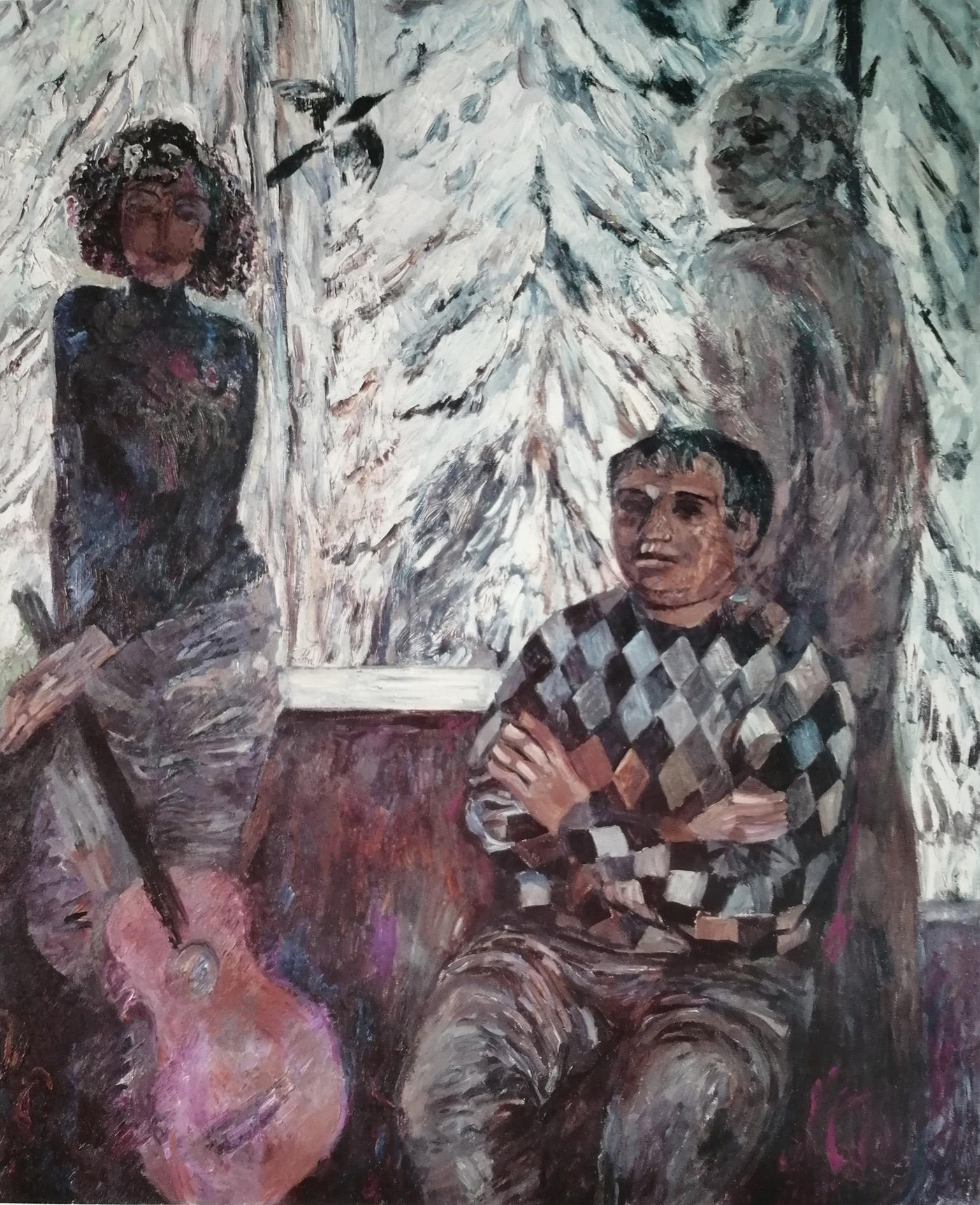
Irina Vysheslavska. Self-portrait with Viktor Pivovarov and Eduard Gorokhovsky. 1975

"Underground," in this context, refers to creativity that is directed towards self-expression of the individual or artistic groups, in contrast to the philosophical, ethical, and aesthetic codes of the mainstream. Ukrainian underground literature was published by the authors themselves and these dissident publications were known as samizdat. Underground music was performed for a small number of listeners.

== History ==
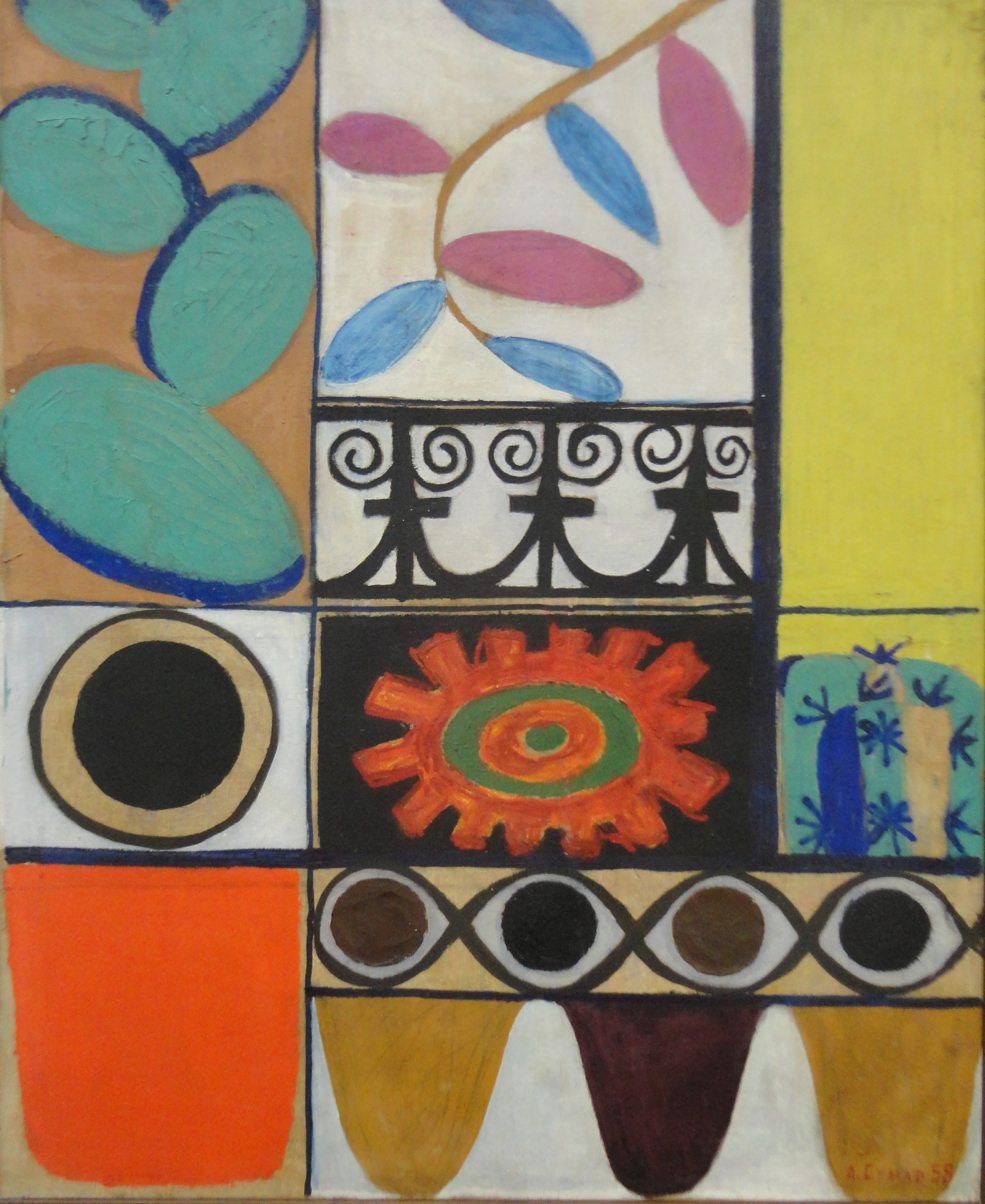
Balcony painting by Anatoly Sumar 1958

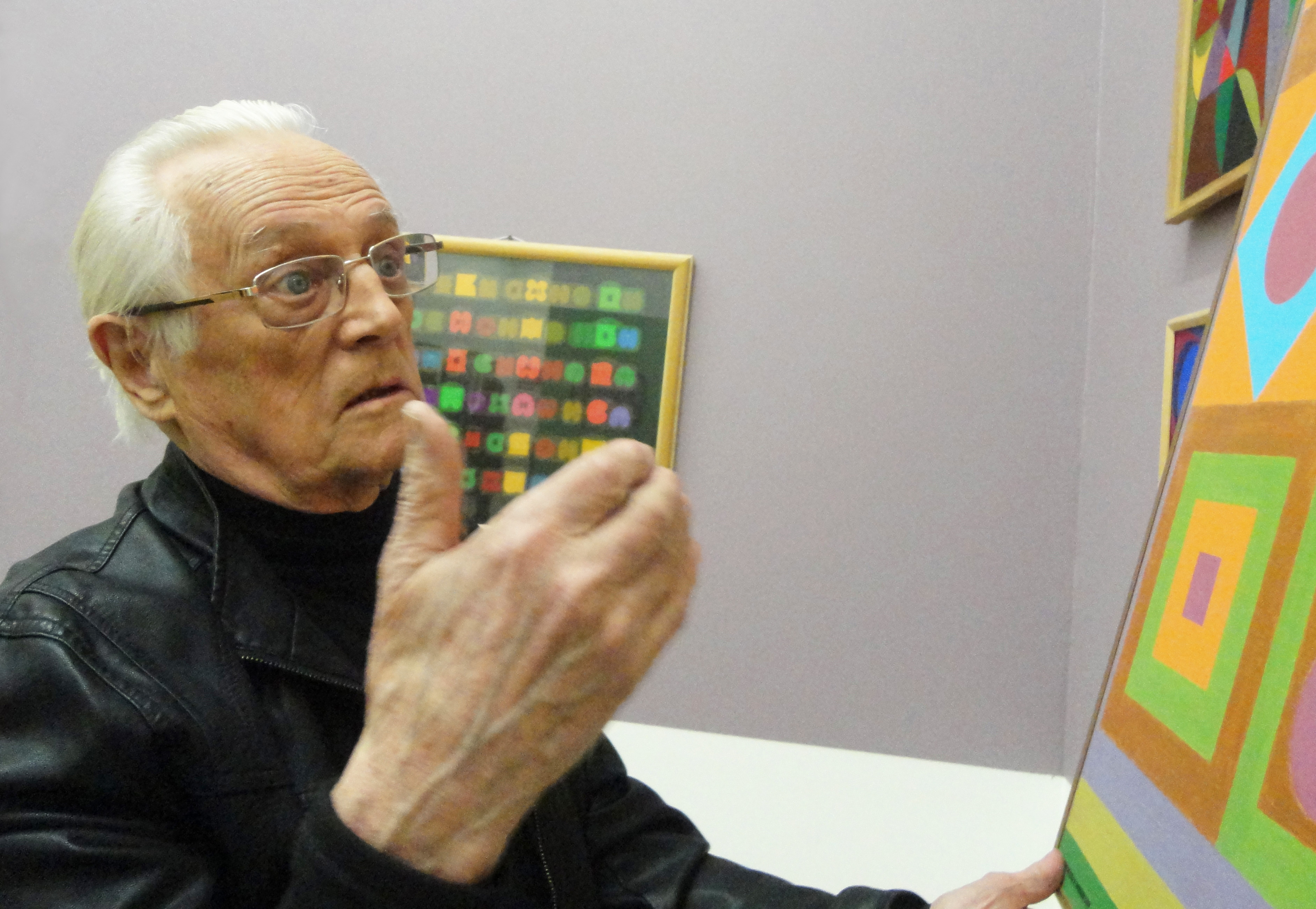
Artist Florian Yuriev at his exhibition Painting 1960–70 in the National Art Museum of Ukraine, 2016

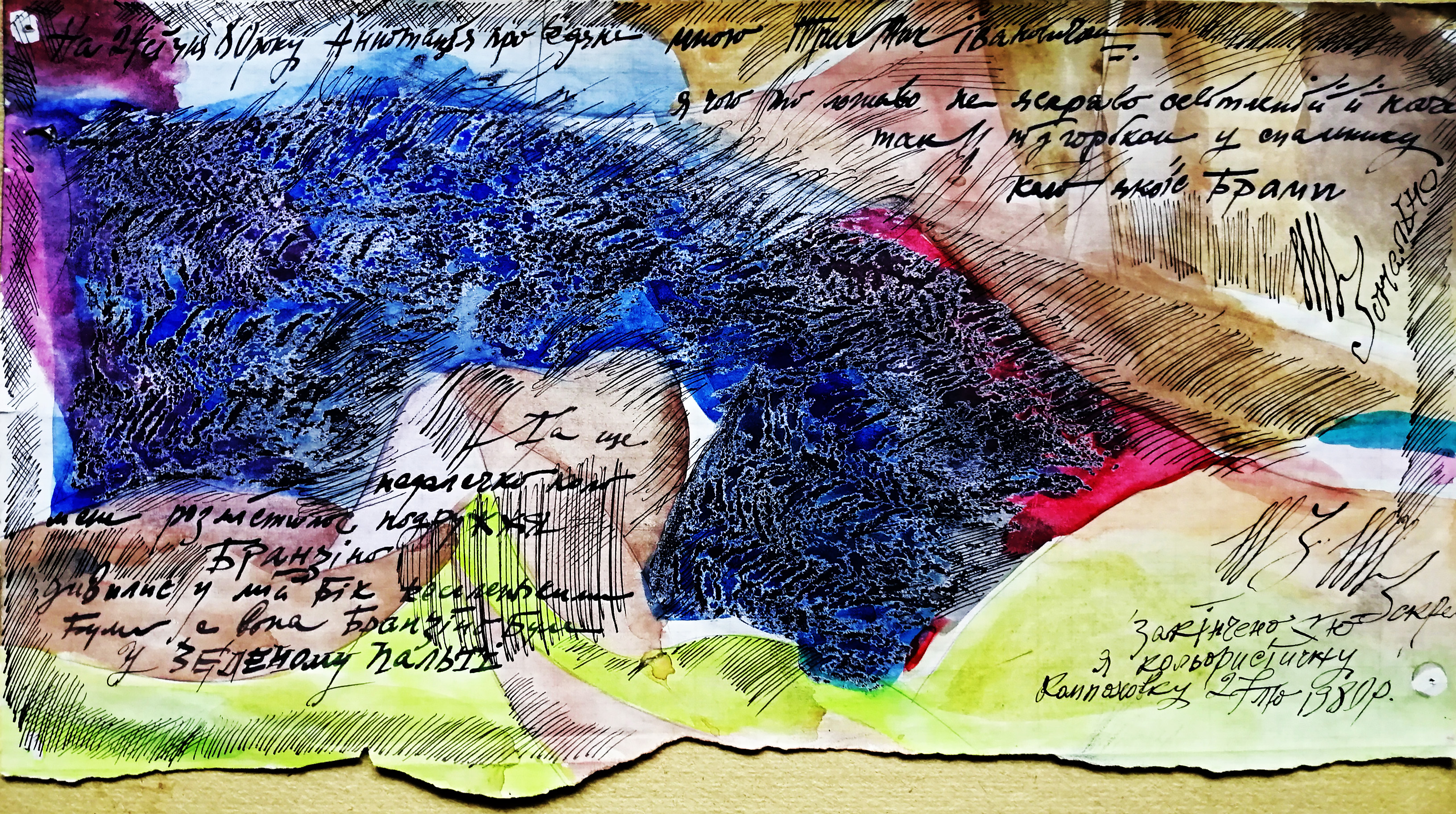
M.Trehub. Zonally, color concept. Paper, mixed media.1980

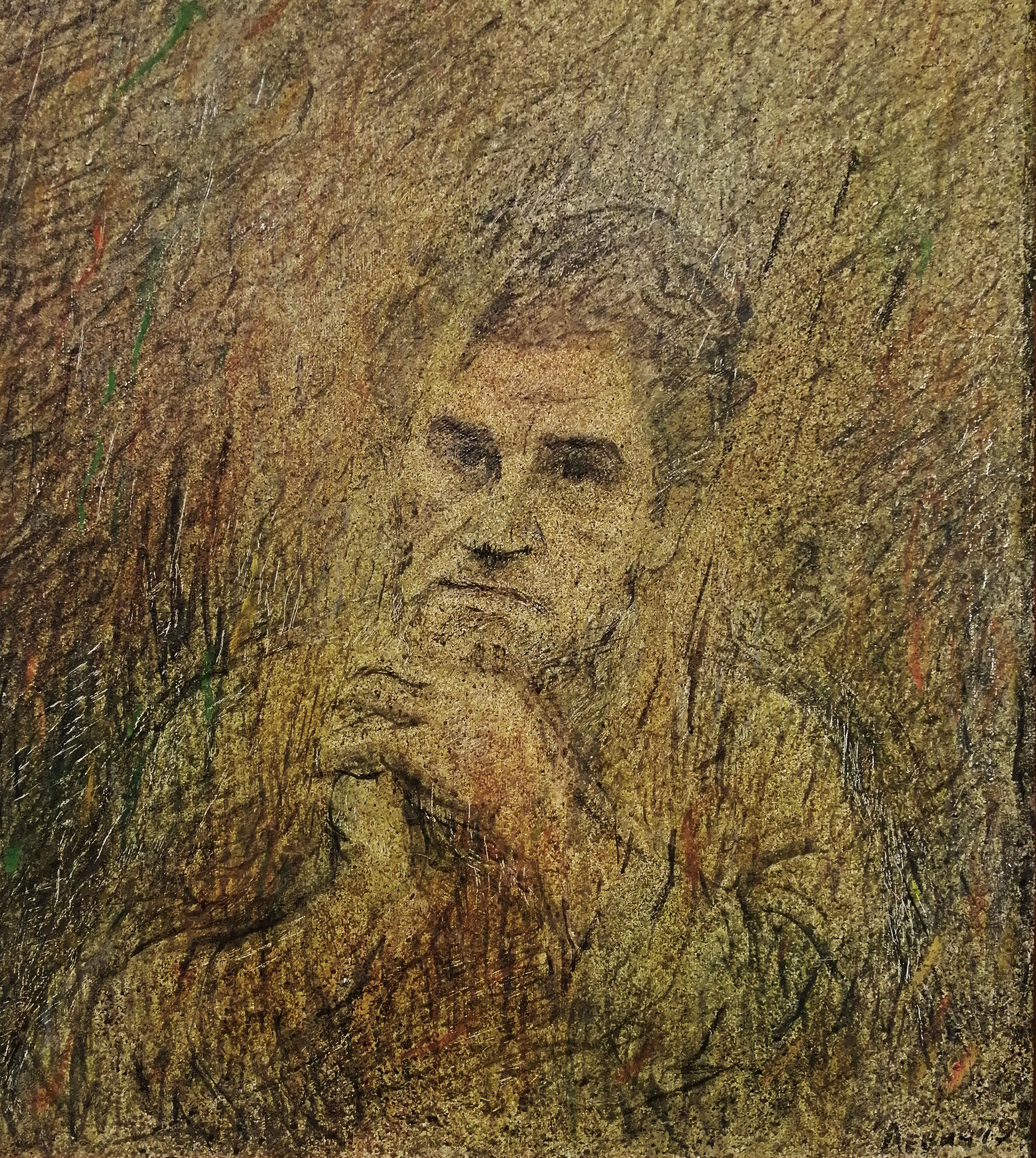
Writer G. Tiutiunnyk by Ukrainian artist Y. Levych.1979.C.,о., 80х60.1979

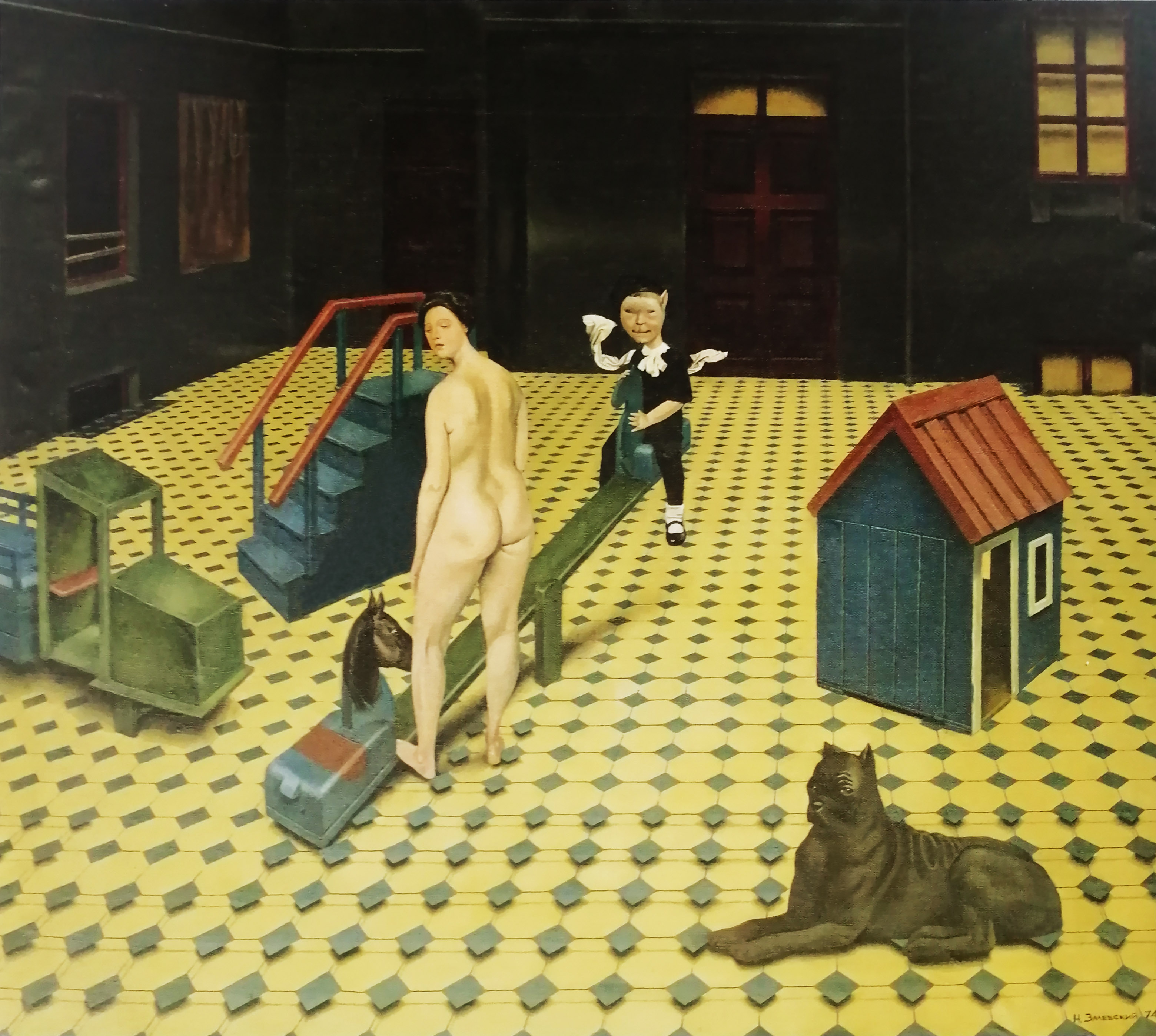
Nicholas Zalevsky . Once upon the Night. C., o. 85 x 92 cm. 1974

During the 1960–1980s, Ukrainian underground art was also called "the second wave of the avant-garde", which was consonant with the first wave of Ukrainian avant-garde in the early twentieth century, which held similarly innovative artistic goals. Underground art exhibition was typically banned. Artists held exhibitions in abandoned buildings, homes of friends, and similar venues. One of the first apartment exhibitions in Ukraine was held in Odesa in 1956, in the apartment of the artist and art critic Oleg Sokolov. The underground movement garnered significant publicity after a 1967 exhibition by two young artists under the title "Sychik+Khruschik" (Stanislav Sychov and Valentin Khrushch). The artists hung their paintings on a street fence, drawing a considerable crowd. The exhibition lasted three hours until authorities dispersed the audience.

Subsequently, a powerful group formed consisting of artists and nonconformists who openly opposed Socialist Realism: Alexander Anufriev, Vladimir Strelnikov, Victor Marynyuk, Valery Basanets and his wife Tatiana, Ludmila Yastreb, Andrei Antoniuk, Lucien Dulfan, Oleg Voloshin, Eugene Rakhmanin, Vladimir Tsiupko, Igor Bozhko, Alexander Stovbur, Yuri Egorov, Michael Kowalski, Sergei Knyazev, Vladimir Naumets, Nikolay Stepanov, Alexander Dmitriev, Nadia Haiduk, Vitaly Sazonov, Viktor Rysovych, Eugene Hodenko, and others.

In 1965, in Kharkiv, a one-day exhibition of nonconformist art was held under the title "Under the arch". It involved such artists as Vagrich Bakhchanyan, Anatoly Krynsky, Michael Basov, Yuri Kuchukov, Anatoly Shulik and others. Some of these individuals studied under famous avant-garde artists who worked in Kharkiv, such as Alexey Shcheglov, Vasyl Yermylov, Borys Kosarev. A creatively-different atmosphere developed in western Ukraine, since many artists there were educated in the European art tradition, rather than Soviet. In the late 1950s, in Uzhhorod, a circle formed of abstract artists which included Paul Bedzir, Elizabeth Kremnytska, Ferenc (Echi) Seman, and others. At the same time, in Lviv, such artists as Marhit and Roman Selsky gathered in their homes a group of artists including Carlo Zvirynsky, Roman Turin, Omelian Lishchynsky, Daniel Dovboshynsky, Vladimir Patyk, Jaroslav Motyka, Oksana and Vladimir Rybotytski. In the 1970-1980s, the Lviv circle of informal artists was supplemented by such names as Alexander Aksinin, Nadezhda Ponomarenko, Galina Zhyhulska, Valery Demyanyshyn, Yevhen Zakharov, Michael Green, Vladimir Pinihin, and others.

In 1960–1964 in Kyiv, the "Creative Youth Club" was active The members consisted of writers, composers, scientists, and actors. Among the artists were Alla Horska and her husband Viktor Zaretsky, Opanas Zalyvakha, Lyudmila Semykina, Galina Sevruk, Galina Zubchenko, Alexander Shkaraputa, and Vladimir Pryadko. The first apartment exhibition in Kyiv (1964) was organized by the artist Anatoly Prevish. His work contained the symbols of the fortitude of the era. In the 1970s, the "Rukh"("Movement") formed. Its members included writers, scientists, and artists. They regularly gathered to discuss the latest artistic trends and to read samizdat. In 1977, they organized an exhibition that included such artists as Yuri Kosin, Nik Niedzelski, Mikola Tregub, Vudon Baklitsky, Nicholas Zalevsky, Alexander Kostetsky, Olena Golub, Vladimir Boguslavsky, Mikhael Zhukov, and others.

Underground artists typically worked at home without any hope of recognition, supplementing their work by such activities as book illustration. In the late 1970s a certain degree of liberalization in the social system occurred, which led to partial acceptance of the unofficial art. Underground artists were able to participate in a limited number of official exhibitions. These artists included Valery Lamakh, Florian Yuriev, Vilen Barsky, Alexander Dubovik, Feodosiy Tetianych, Ernest Kotkov, Alexander Shuldyzhenko, Gregory Gavrylenko, Anatoly Sumar, Akim Levich, Zoe Lerman, Ivan Marchuk, Irina Vysheslavska, Alexander Pavlov, Julius Sheinis, Michael Weinstein, Anatoly Lymarev, Ada Rybachuk and Volodymyr Melnychenko.

Many underground artists suffered persecution by the authorities for their stances. Some of them died young, while others were forced to leave the country and work in Europe or the USA. Despite the hard times, many artists persevered by performing "quiet resistance" with their brushes and paints, creating innovative and unusual art displays, performances, and installations. Their works are now recognized across the globe and constitute the bulk of collections at museums such as Zimmerli Art Museum at Rutgers University, Museum of Russian Art, National Art Museum of Ukraine, NT-Art Gallery, and others.

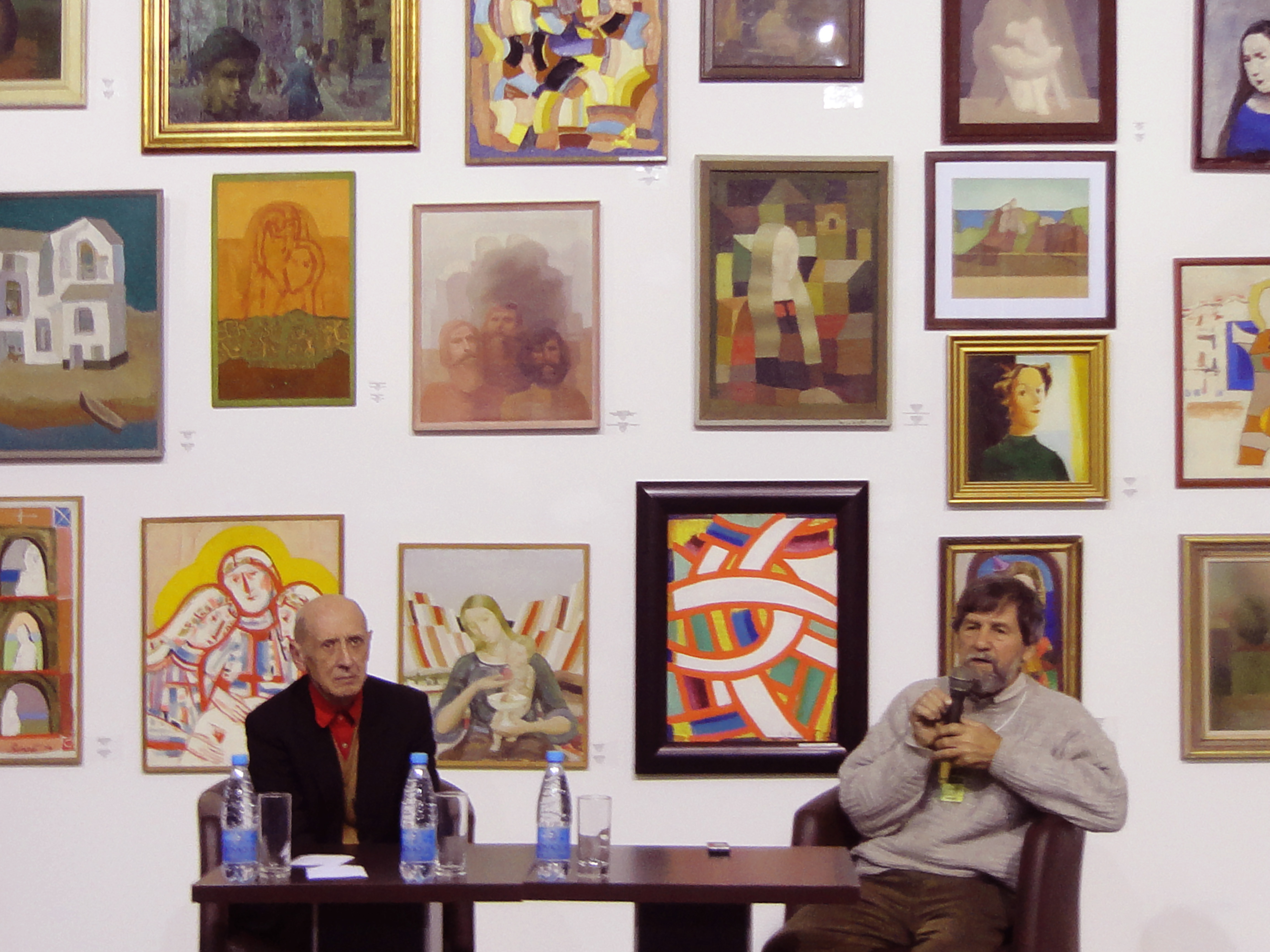
Artists V. Basanets and V. Maryniuk at a conference in Kyiv dedicated to Odesa nonconformism 2013

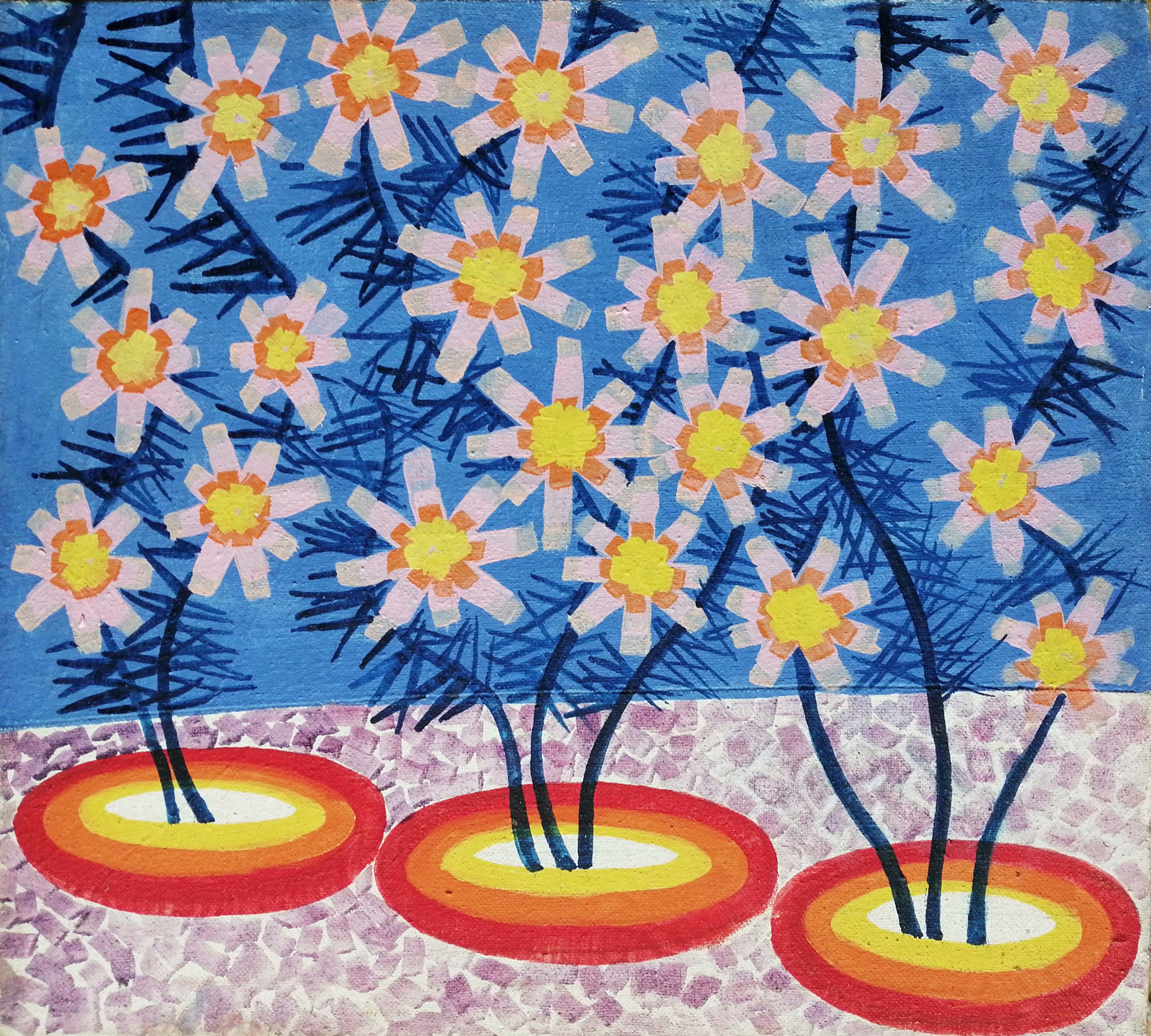
Star Flowers. Painting by V. Baklitskyi 1990

== See also ==
- Alternative culture
- Counterculture
- English underground
- Notes from Underground
- Prague Underground
- Soviet Nonconformist Art
- Underground culture

== Sources ==
- in ukr: G. Vysheslavsky, O. Sidor Hibelynda . // Terminology of Modern Art, Paris-Kyiv, Terra Incognita, 2010, - P.32-37. ISBN 978-966-96839-2-2
- in ukr:Olena Golub. The Bright and Gloomy Days of Underground Artists//Kyiv, Published House "Antiquary", 2017, ISBN 978-617-7285-11-2
- in ukr.:"Lesya Smyrna". Nonconformism Century in Ukrainian visual art // Kyiv : Phoenix, 2017. ISBN 978-966-131-499-2
