= Museum of Russian Art =

Museum of Russian Art may refer to:

- Museum of Russian Art (Minnesota)
- Museum of Russian Art (New Jersey)

== See also ==
- Russian Museum (with various previous names), in Saint Petersburg, Russia
