= Nicholas Zalevsky =

American figurative painter (born 1951)

- Микола Залевський
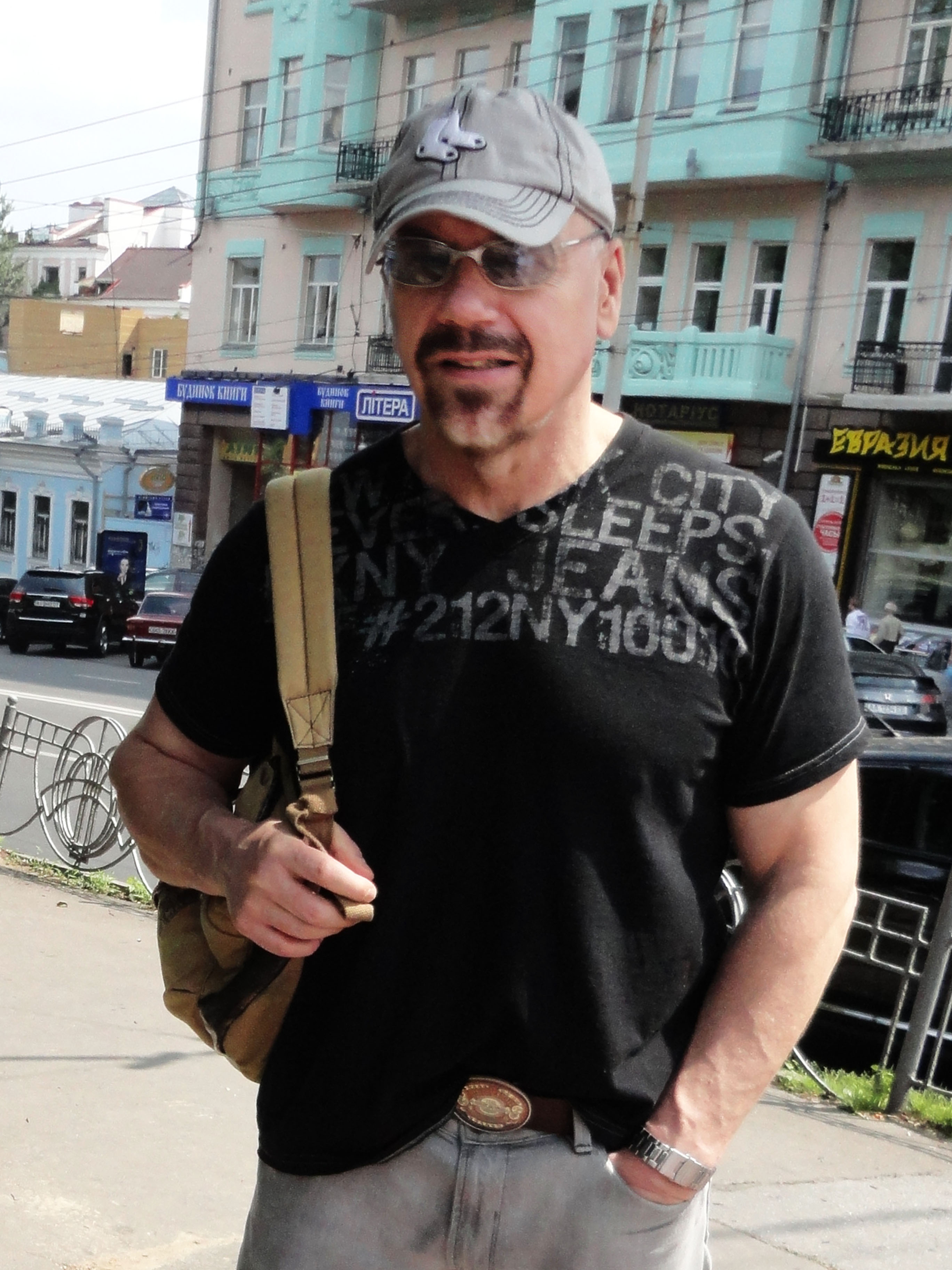
- Born: Mykola Rakhmilovych Zalevsky; February 19, 1951 (age 75); Kiev, Ukrainian SSR, Soviet Union (now Kyiv, Ukraine)
- Education: Ukrainian Academy of Printing
- Movement: Figurative art, Magic realism
- Awards: Museum of Russian Art Best Picture Award, 2012

Nicholas Zalevsky (born Mykola Rakhmilovych Zalevsky, (Note: Ukrainian: Микола Рахмілович Залевський, romanized: Mykola Rakhmilovych Zalevskyi) February 19, 1951) is a Ukrainian and American figurative painter. His works have been associated with magic realism, photorealism and surrealism. He started his career as a Soviet Ukrainian underground artist opposing the then-dominant art regime of socialist realism. Since 1991 he has worked out of West Hartford, Connecticut, USA, with regular visits to Ukraine.

== Awards ==
- First Prize for Morning at a Nursing Home at the "Nor'Easter: The 56th Annual Juried Members Exhibition", New Britain Museum of American Art, 2026.
- First Place of an international on-line Art-competition.net —«Scapes-2018»
- Museum of Russian Art, Jersey City, New Jersey, United States — Best Picture Award, 2012
- West Hartford, Connecticut Art League, United States — Best Picture Award, 2011
- The Canton's Gallery, Canton, Connecticut, United States, — Best Picture Award, 1995

== Biography ==
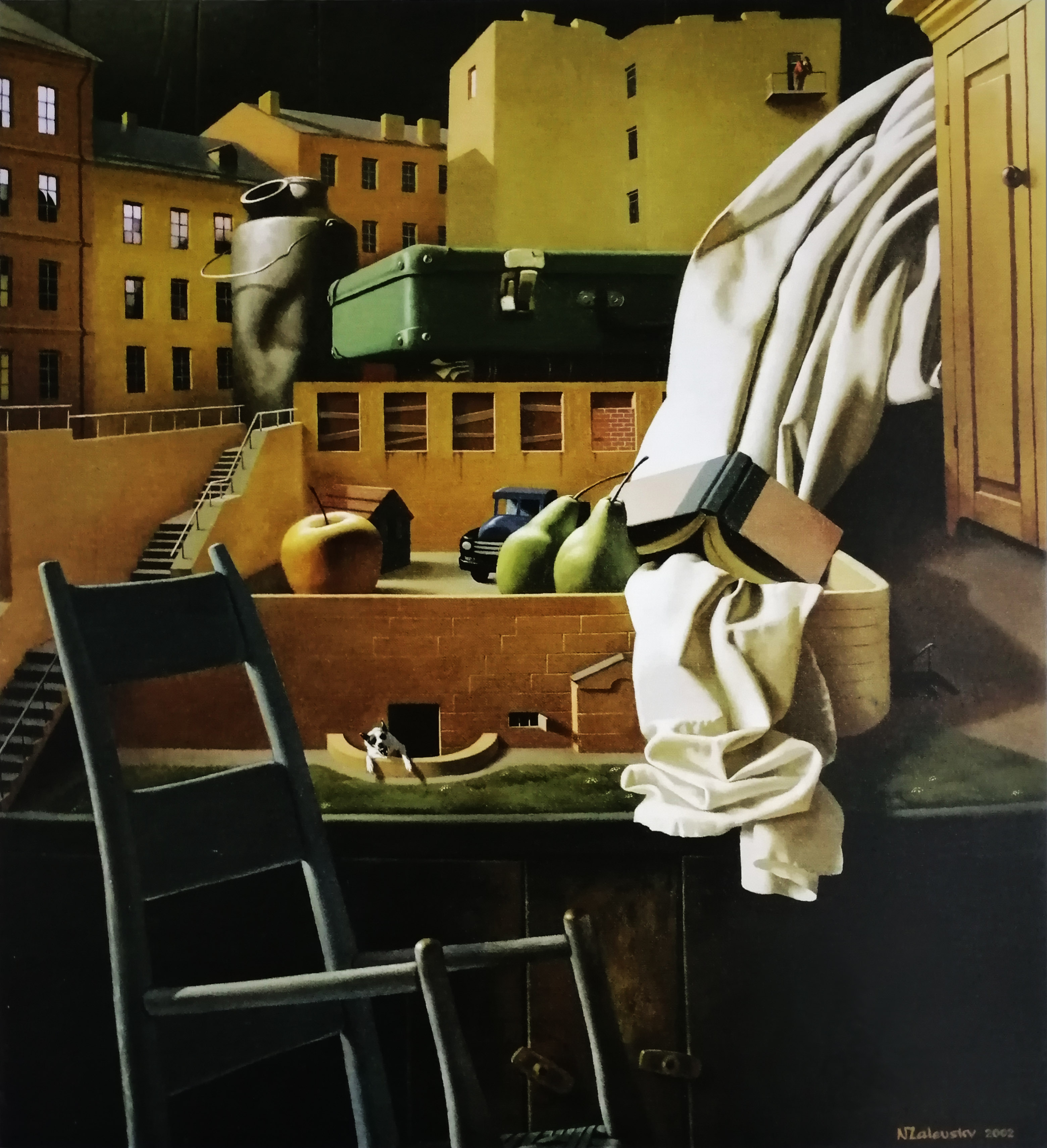
Nick Zalevsky. The Stairwell Where My Brother Fractured His Finger (Kyiv Slill Life). C., o. 96 x 86 cm. 2002

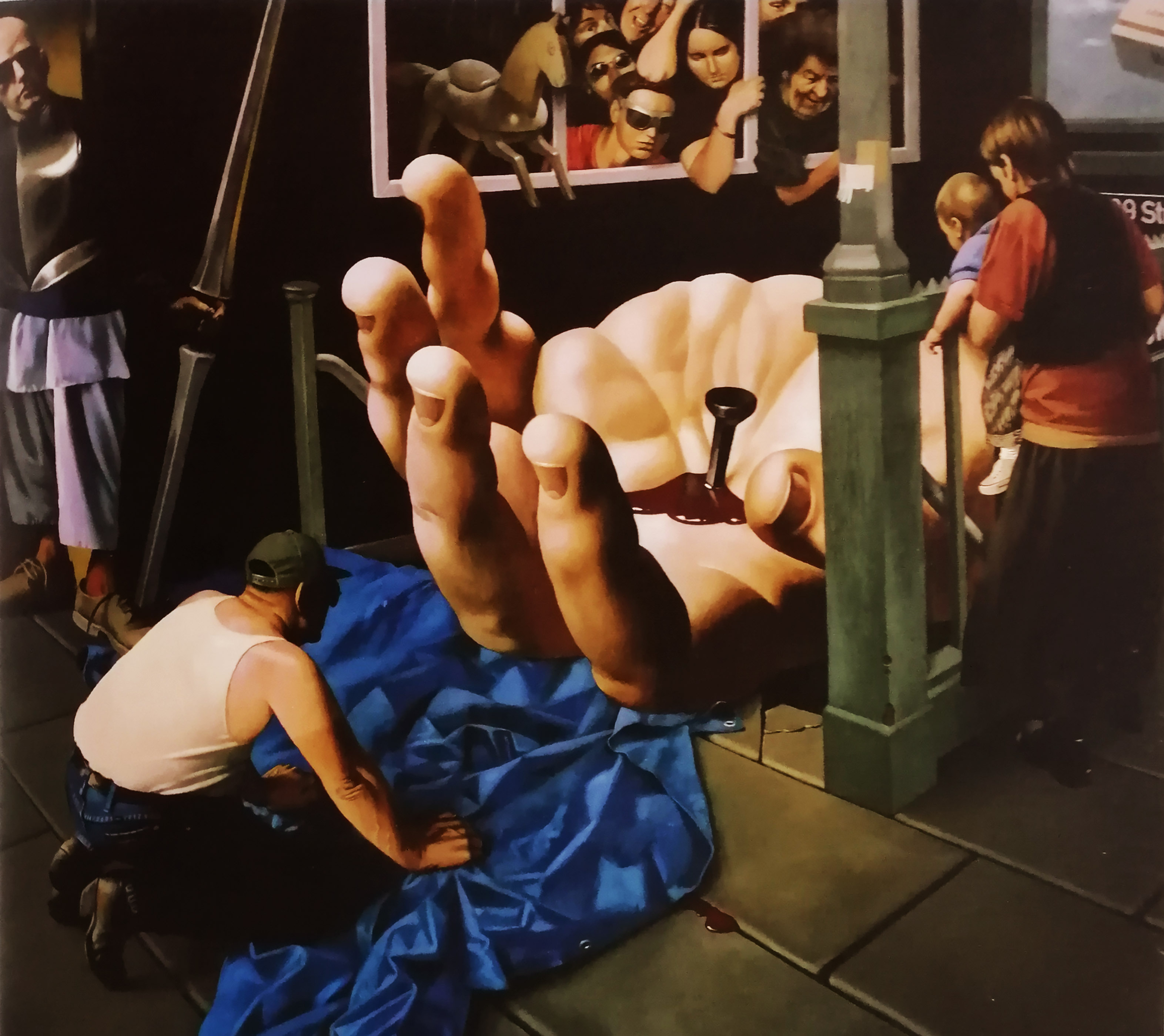
Nick Zalevsky. Manhattan Crucifixion. C., o. 127 x 112 cm. 1996

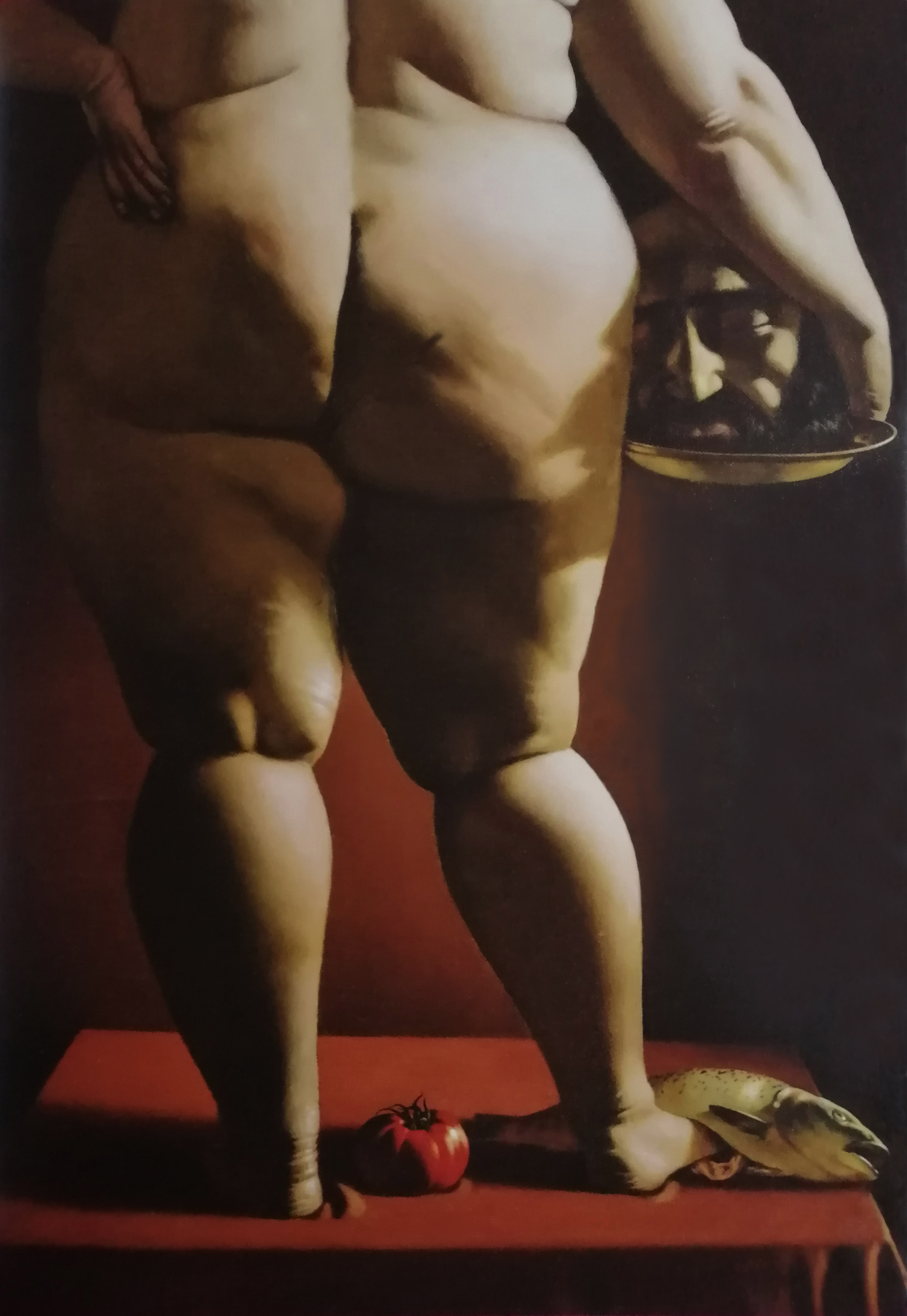
Nick Zalevsky. Salome. C., o. 96 x 79 cm. 2002

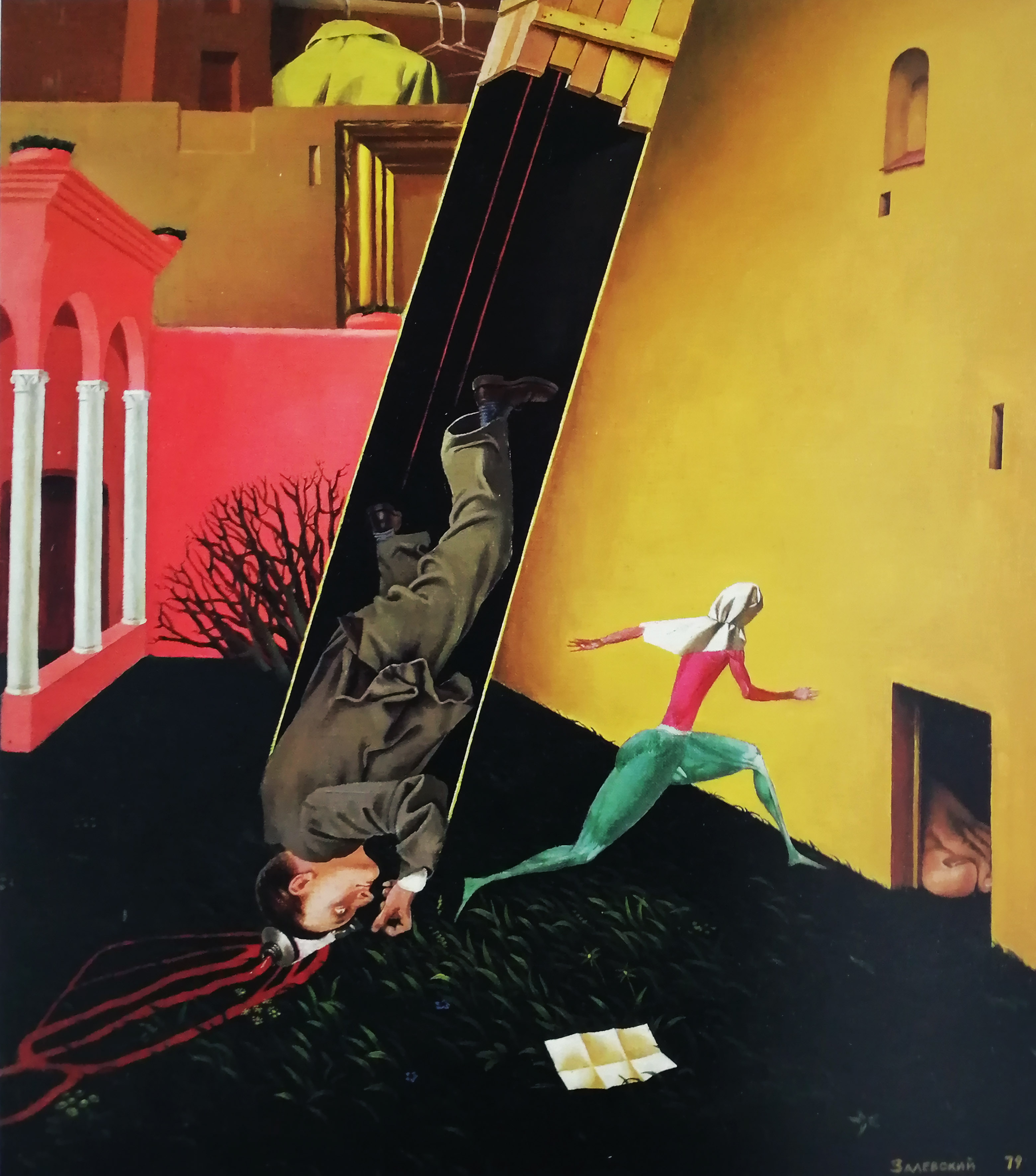
Nick Zalevsky. Solo For Soprano. C., o. 53 x 47 cm. 1979

Nicholas Zalewsky was born on February 19, 1951, in Kiev, Ukraine, to an ethnically mixed family of a Ukrainian mother and a Jewish father. Zalevsky's only sibling is, — his brother Vladislav who is 17 years his senior. From his early childhood, Nicholas showed a talent for drawing, which led him to study in specialized Shevchenko State Art School in Kiev from where he, —graduated in 1968 (as his friend Les Podervianskyi). Then he attended the Ukrainian Academy of Printing in Kiev graduating from its Department of Graphic Arts in 1976 and moving on to work as a children books illustrator. He was friends with artists and teachers Florian Yuryev and Vilen Barskyi (sometimes he worked as a bodybuilder in his drawing lessons).

His artistic position drastically differed from the canon of Socialist Realism. His artistic views being greatly different from those that conformed to the canons Socialist Realism. In 1977, Nickolas took part in underground art exhibition by the art association «Rukh» («Movement») along with such artists as Mykola Trehub, Vudon Baklitsky, Yuri Kosin, Alexander Kostetsky, Olena Golub and others. Naturally, he did not expect to achieve any success in a country that did not let him develop his talent. For years, Zalevsky lived by doing odd jobs while exhibiting his paintings in such conditions as private apartments or abandoned buildings. This led the artist to seek and develop new directions in his work. In 1991, he and his family moved to the US joining his elder brother who had already settled there.

== Creativity ==
Zalevsky's painting manner exhibits the features of narrative fiction based on the discourse of the absurd associated with the works of Arthur Rimbaud, Samuel Beckett, and Charles Bukowski. «I always wanted to blow up this perfectly-fed world of Dutch still life. The picture is not entitled to be a supplement to the expensive interior» — writes Zalevsky . His "Dutch Still Life" (2005) contains, in addition to ordinary objects (such as potatoes, an onion, a plate and a bottle of beer) a cut-off human finger which does not belong to this traditionally set group of objects. Zalevsky's multi-figured composition "Crucifixion" (1996) gives an unusual treatment to the theme of Christ by depicting only one of his nail-pierced hands of gigantic size stuck out of an entrance to a NYC subway station. His interpretation of such mythological figures as Salome (2002) and Centaur (2016) denies them their customary pathos and heroism. Zalevsky works on his every in painstakingly careful and lengthy way, with many preparatory drawings, during several years for one painting. As a result, his paintings have received much attention and appreciation at international art competitions.

=== Exhibitions ===
- 2012 — Museum of Russian Art, Jersey City, New Jersey, USA, (personal exhibition)
- 2012 — Museum of Russian Art, Jersey City, New Jersey, USA, Best Picture Award
- 2011 — West Hartford Art League, West Hartford, Connecticut, USA, (personal exhibition).
- 2011 — CT +6, West Hartford Art League, West Hartford, Connecticut, USA, Best of Show Award.
- 2009 — Jewish Community Center, West Hartford, Connecticut, USA
- 2006 — Gallery "Collection", Kiev, Ukraine (personal exhibition).
- 1995 — The Canton's Gallery, Canton, Connecticut, USA, Best Picture Award.
- 1977,1978 — exhibitions of underground creative association «Rukh»(«Movement»), Kiev, Ukraine

== Sources ==
- in ukr.: Glib Viches, Sidor Hibelynda-O. // Terminology of Modern Art, Paris-Kyiv, Terra Incognita, 2010, - P.239. ISBN 978-966-96839-2-2
- in ukr.:' Olena Golub.Dialogue across the ocean. //Den(The Day), 2006, —Dec.9
- Skliarenko H. The Paintings of Mykola Zalevsky: Art in the "Glimpse of Being" // Fine Art. 2007. No. 3.
