= Fedir Tetianych =

Ukrainian painter (1942 - 2007)

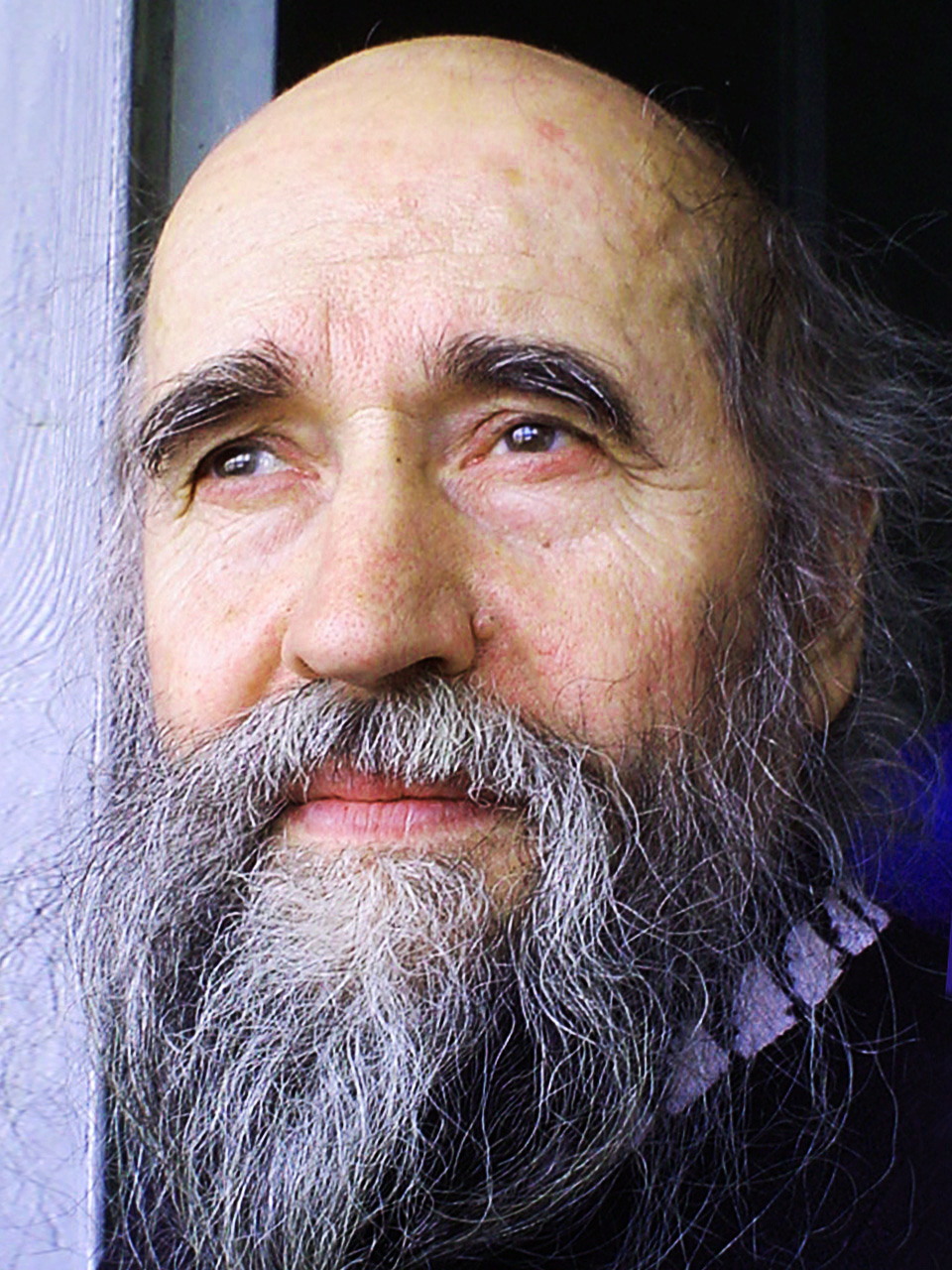
- Artist Fedir Tetianych 2005
- Born: 17 February 1942; Kniazhychi, Kyiv Oblast, Ukrainian SSR, Soviet Union
- Died: 18 February 2007 (aged 65); Kyiv, Ukraine
- Known for: performance
- Notable work: painting, installations, poems
- Movement: contemporary art

Fedir Kostiantynovych Tetianych (Ukrainian: Федір Костянтинович Тетянич; 17 February 1942 – 18 February 2007, Kyiv, Ukraine) was a Ukrainian artist, painter, performance artist and philosopher, representative of Ukrainian underground, participant of the Ukrainian New Wave. Some of his works are displayed in the National Art Museum of Ukraine and private collections.

== Biography ==
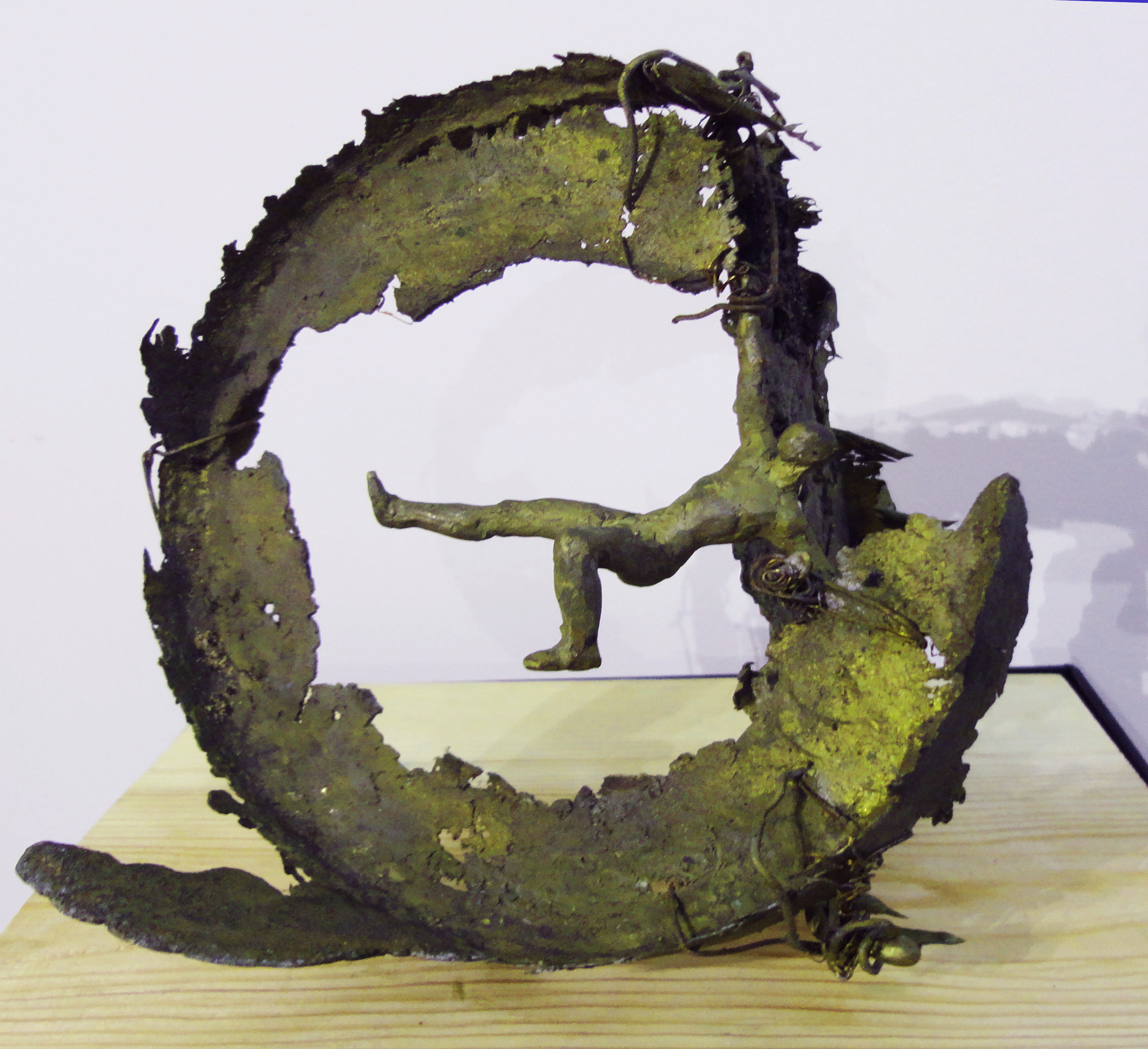
"Man and infinity", object by Ukrainian artist F.Tetianych,1980

Fedir Tetyanich was born 17 February 1942 in Kniazhychi, Kyiv Oblast, Ukrainian SSR.

The main theme of his performances was freedom (he nicknamed himself "Freepulia"), and was one of the first performance artist in post-Soviet Ukraine.

Fedir was married to Ganna, had two children, Bohdan and Lada.

Fedir Tetyanych died in Kyiv on February 18, 2007.

== See also ==
- Superhero Frypulman

== Sources ==
- Film by O.Dirdovsky about Tetianych
- "Всесвіт Фріпулья".
- Alexandra Vagner. "Everyone saw what he wanted." Miracle work of Fedor Tetyanich. Radio Svoboda 13.03.2021
