= Yuri Kosin =

Ukrainian photographer (1948–2022)

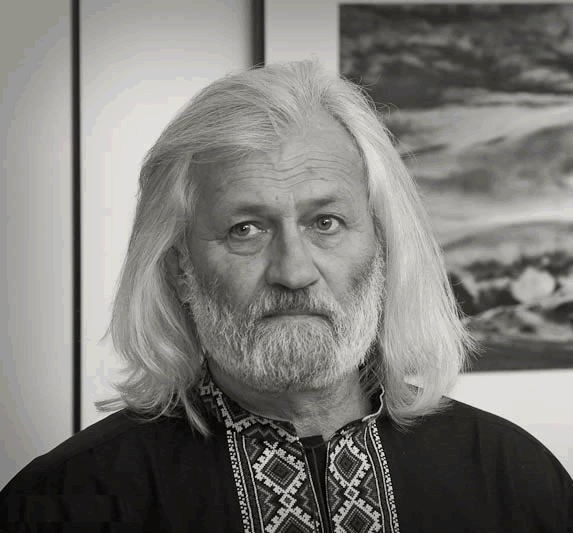
- Born: 26 September 1948; Kompaniivka, Kirovohrad Oblast, Ukrainian SSR, USSR
- Died: 24 October 2022 (aged 74)
- Education: Kyiv Polytechnic Institute; Kyiv University's Institute of Journalism
- Occupation: Photographer
- Website: www.yurikosin.com

Yuri Kosin (Ukrainian: Косін Юрій Олекса́ндрович; 26 September 1948 – 24 October 2022) was a Ukrainian photographer, lecturer, curator of exhibitions, and traveler. Kosin was a member of the National Society of Photo Artists of Ukraine, tutor and curator at the Independent Academy of the Photographic Arts of Ukraine, organizer and curator of the "Eksar" photo gallery, Ukraine. He was also a member of the "Kulturforum" association and the artistic studio "Kulturwerkstatt Trier", Germany.

Kosin was a permanent member of the Ukrainian TV programme "Svoimy ochyma" (Eyewitness) dedicated to travel and tourism. He was named one of the experts in photography criticism in Ukraine in expert poll conducted in 2011 and was a participant of the Ukrainian New Wave.

== Biography ==
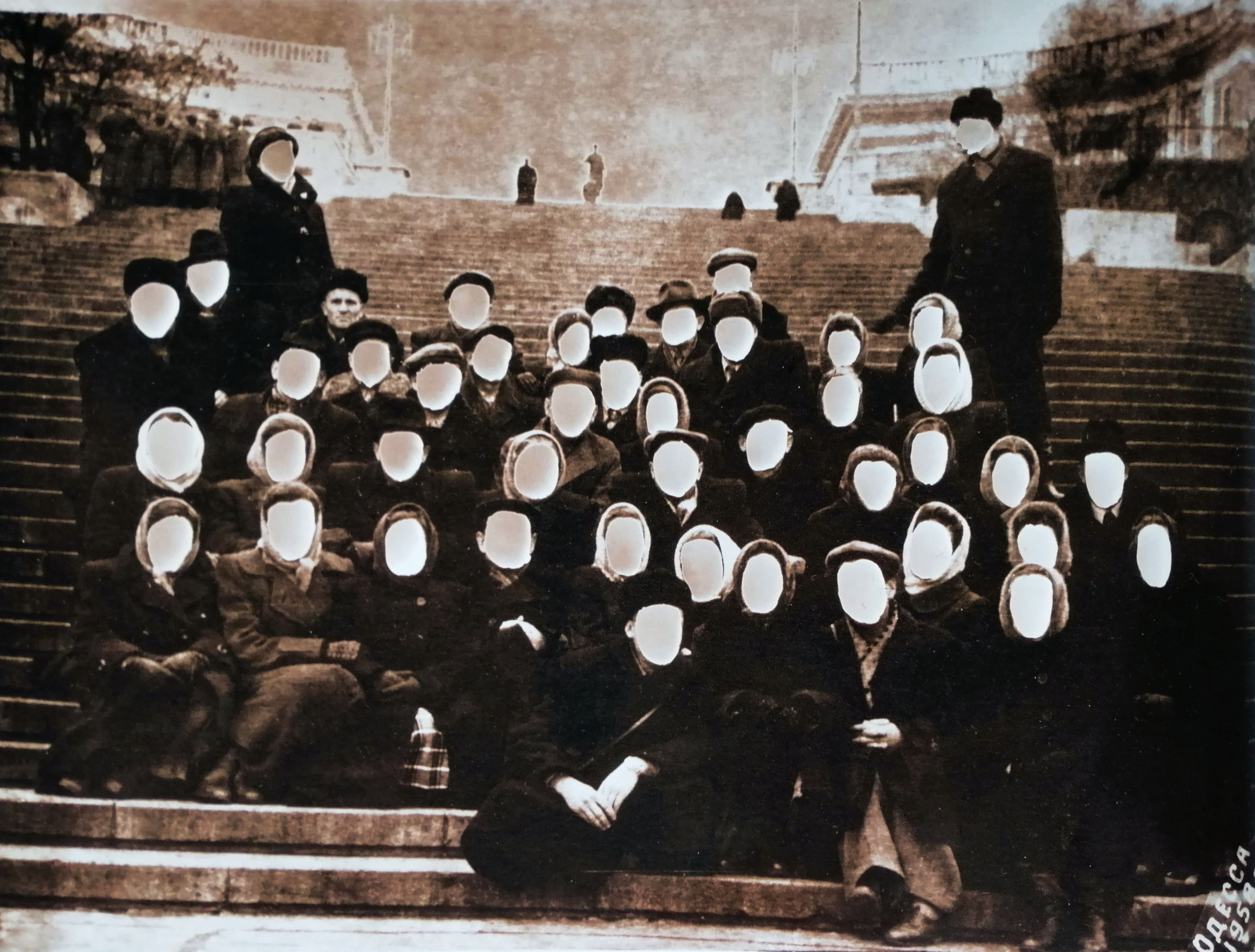
Photo Father by Yuri Kosin-1995

Kosin was born on 26 September 1948 in Kompaniivka, at the time in the Ukrainian SSR of the Soviet Union (today in the Kirovohrad Oblast of central Ukraine). In 1974 he graduated from the Kiev Polytechnic Institute. For some time he worked as an engineer, but later he became fond of art and photography. In 1988 he graduated from Kiev Institute of Journalism. In 1977 he was co-curator of avant-garde association «Rukh»(«Movement») and underground exhibition, in which were artists: Mikola Trehub, Vudon Baklitsky, Alexander Kostetsky, Olena Golub, Nicholas Zalevsky and others. Later Kosin organized a lot of exhibitions, mostly photography, both his personally and for groups.

Kosin later lived in Irpin (Kyiv region, Ukraine). His daughter Vera Kosina is a photographer too. She lives and works in Poland. Yuri Kosin died on 24 October 2022, at the age of 74.

== Achievements in photography ==
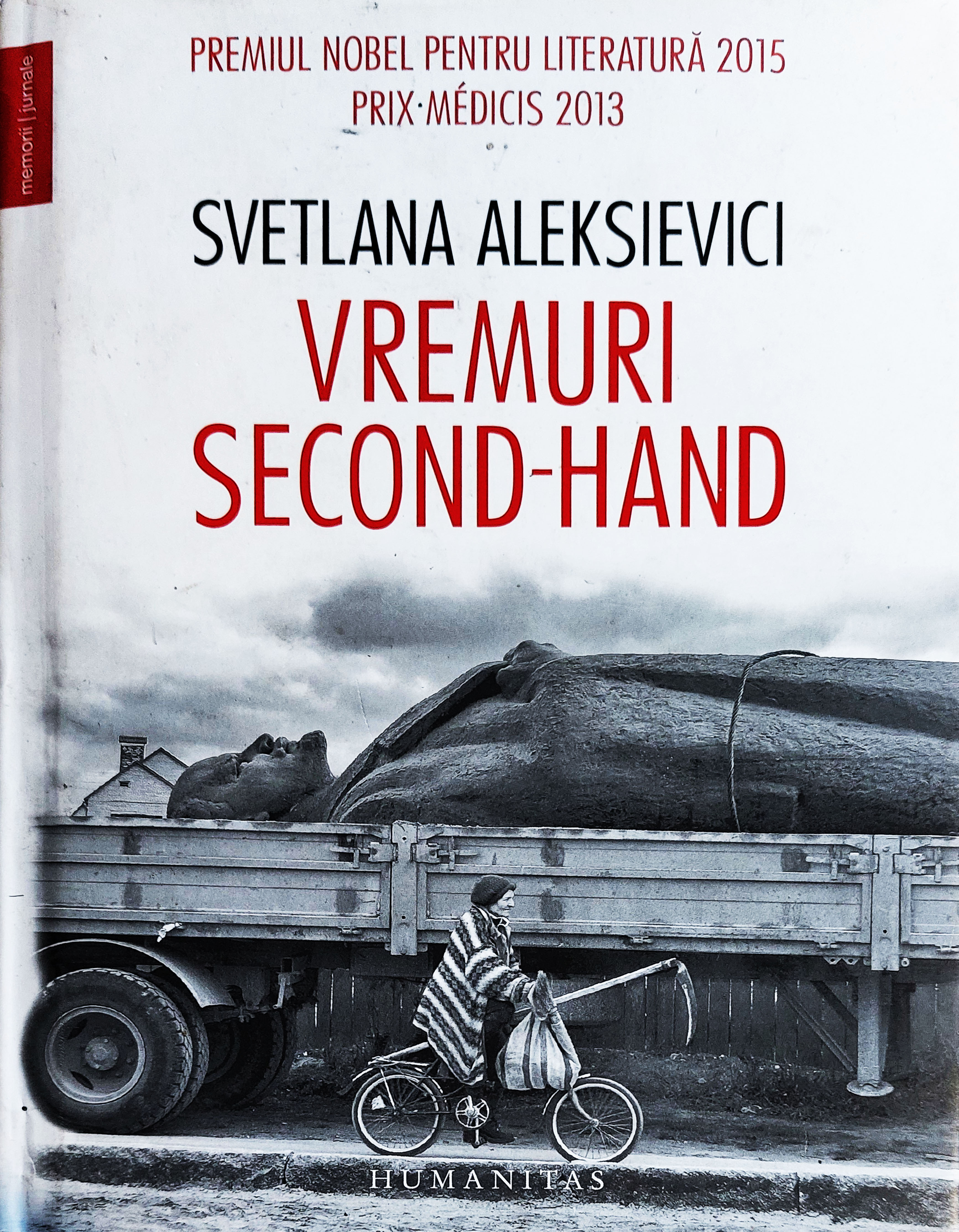
Cover of the Aleksievich book with photo by Yuri Kosin-2016

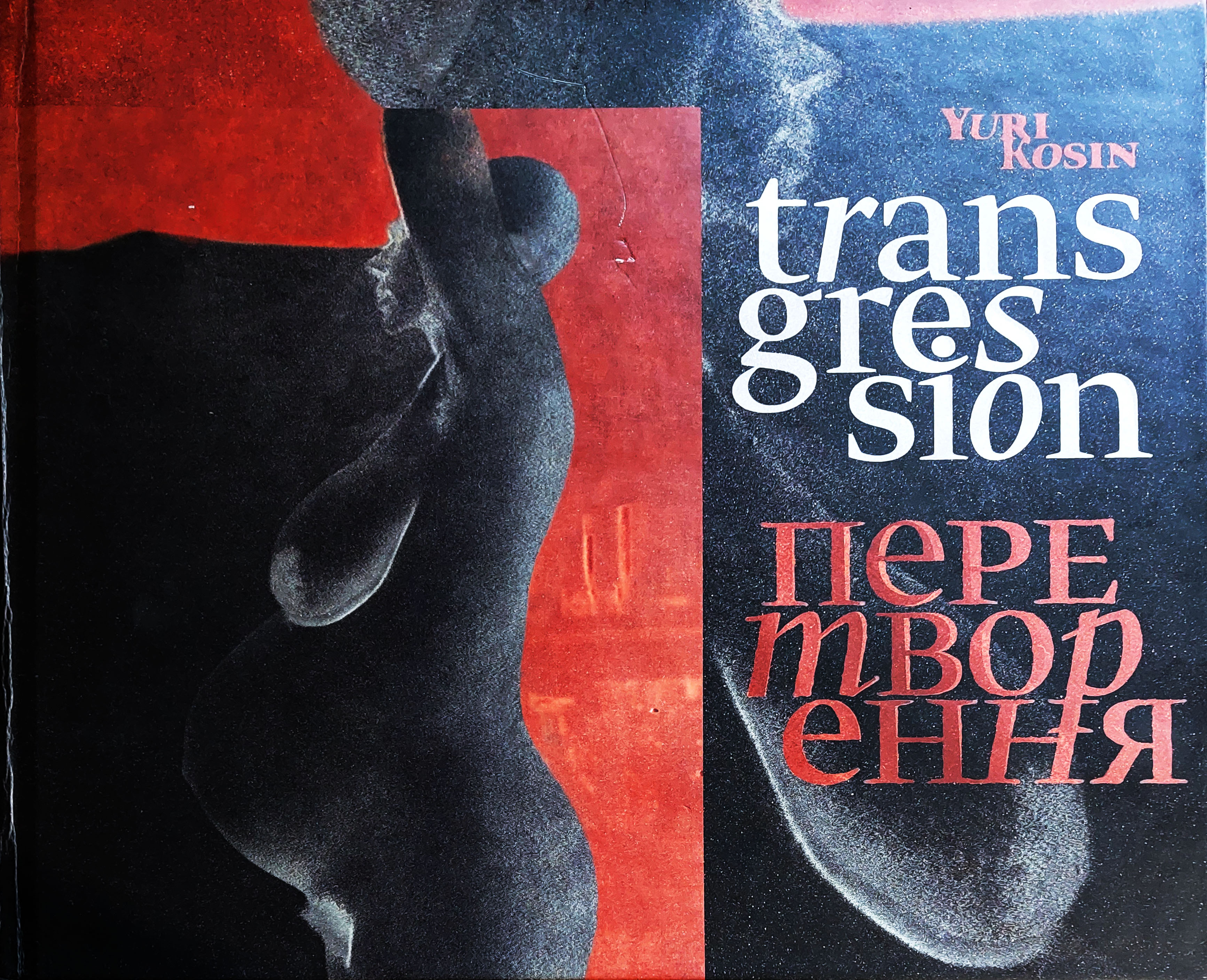
Cover of the book Transgression by Yuri Kosin-2019

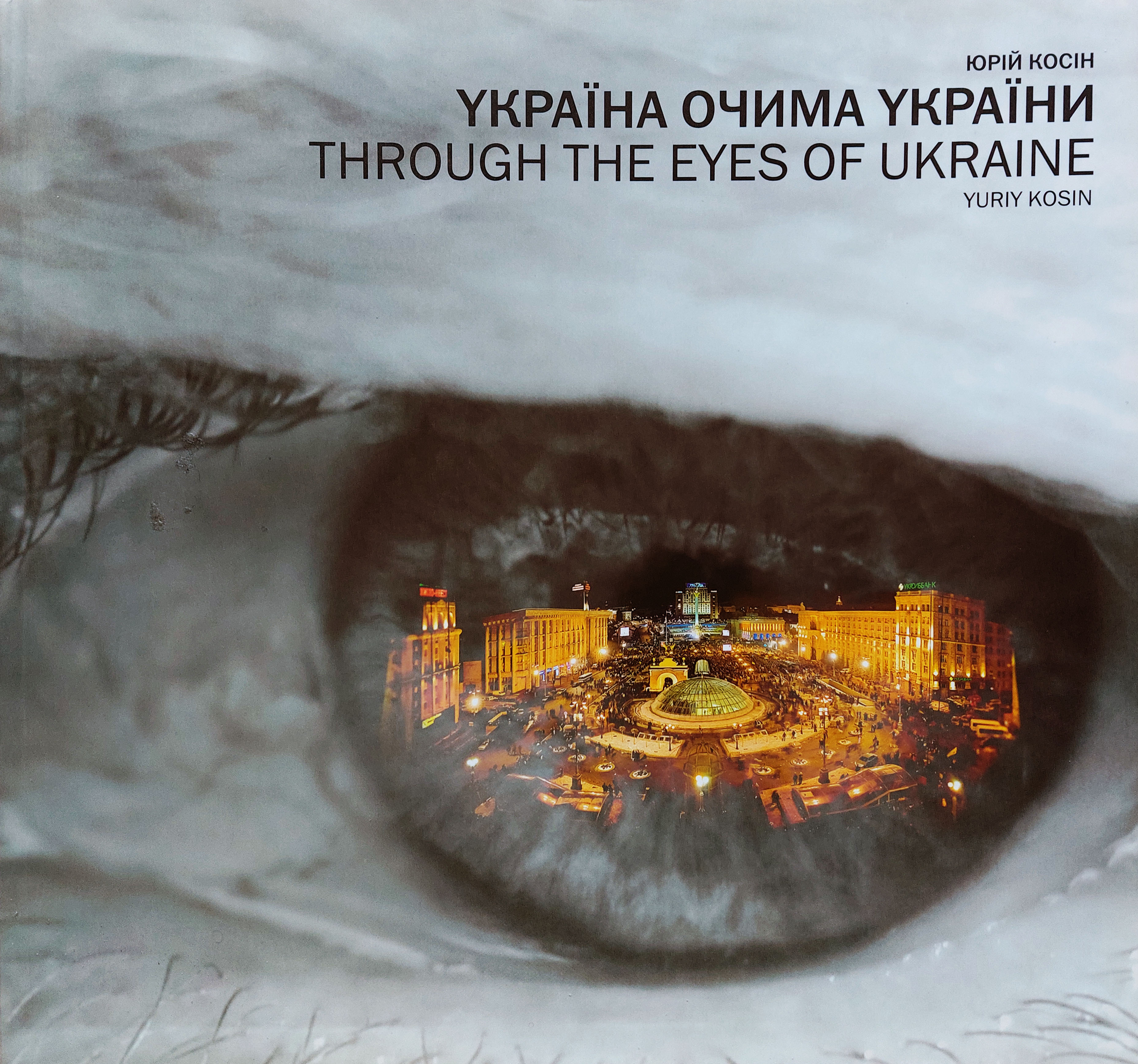
Cover of the photo album Ukraine through the eyes of Ukraine by Yuri Kosin-2005

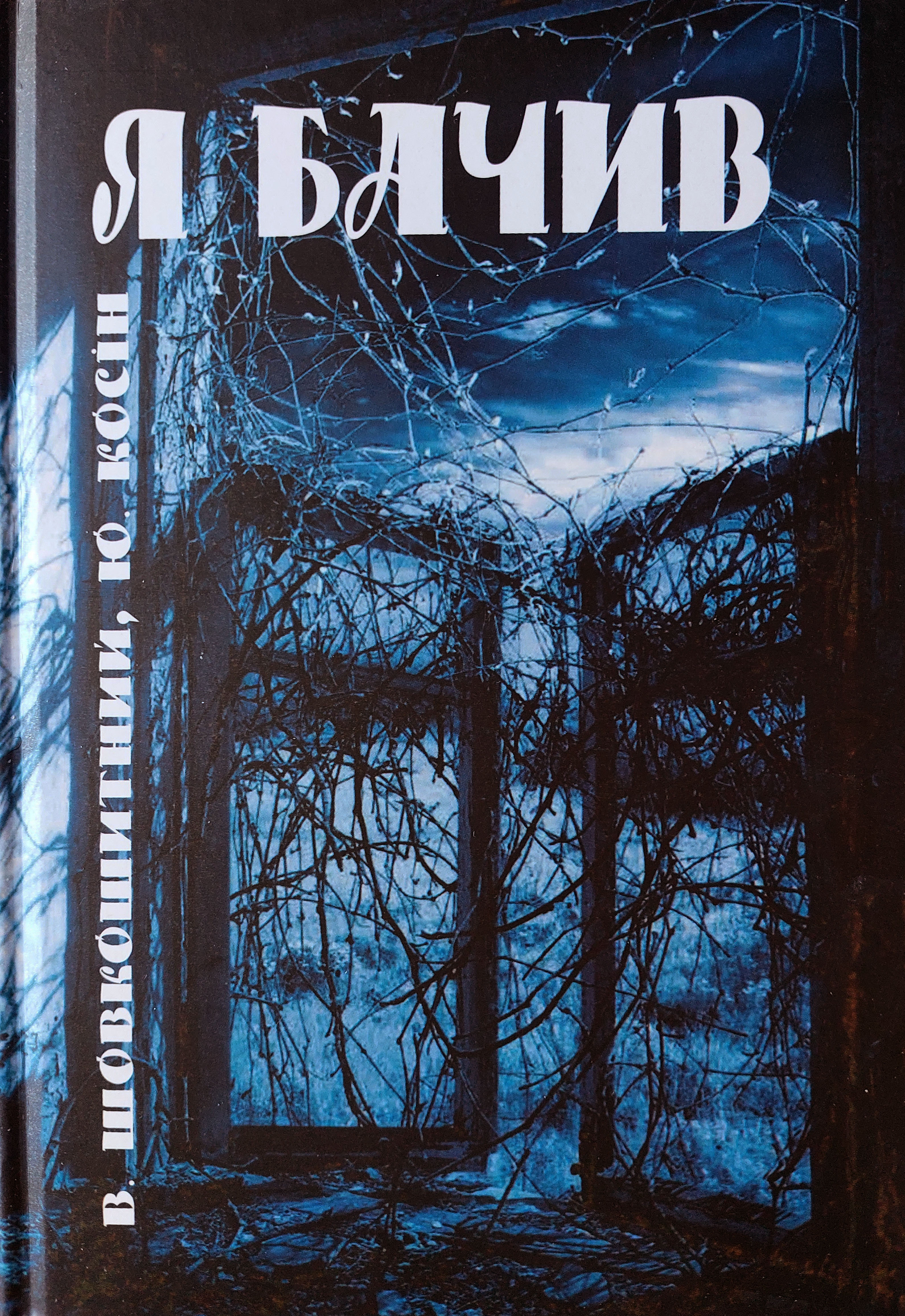
Cover of the book I've seen - photo by Yuri Kosin-2016

Since 1987 Yuri Kosin has participated in over 40 joint exhibitions in Ukraine, Russia, the United Arab Emirates, Germany, Belarus, Slovakia, the United States, Poland, the United Kingdom, Israel, Lithuania and France. Many of his works are included in private collections in Switzerland, the United States, Poland, Russia, Ukraine, Israel, France, Belgium, the Netherlands and Germany. There are also some of Kosin's pictures placed in The Photography Fund in Moscow, the Latvian Museum of Photography in Riga, Lancaster University, the National Historical Museum of Ukraine. For over 20 years Yuri Kosin has been engaged in organizing photo exhibitions of Ukrainian artists.

In the 1980s, Yuri Kosin created his own artistic method which was subsequently named the "transgression". From 1980 to 1990, "transgression" was achieved by a partial physical and chemical destruction of the emulsion.

== Personal exhibitions ==
- 1988 – "Interconnection", exhibition hall of the association of artists of Ukraine, Kiev, Soviet Union
- 1990 – "Infected Zone", Budinok Pismennika, Kiev, Soviet Union
- 1991 – "The world we lost", "Kinocentr", Moscow, Soviet Union
- 1992 – "Chernobyl", International art gallery, Minneapolis, USA

Action Tour "Chernobyl – meeting place", Great Britain USA
Performance "Meeting place" (“First Moment of Plague"), Andrievskiy uzviz, Kiev, Ukraine

- 1994 – Performance "Building model of contemporary mind" Irpin, Ukraine

"Live pictures", museum "Kyiv Fortress", Kyiv, Ukraine

- 1995 – "Transgression", Creative academy "Bezalel", Jerusalem, Israel

"Chernobyl 1986–1995", House of three languages, Lumen, Belgium
"Silver Light", "Garage" gallery, Riga, Latvia
"Personification", Latvian Museum of Photography, Riga, Latvia

- 1996 – "Transgression", French cultural center, Kyiv, Ukraine

"Passage lesson", De Markten Gemeenschapscentrum, Brussels, Belgium
"Anabiosis", National Historical Museum of Ukraine, Kiev, Ukraine
"Emanation", Eastern-Westerneuropean cultural center «Palais Jalta», Frankfurt, Germany

- 1997 – Performance "Creative advertisement", Irpin, Ukraine

Transgression, Cultural Center "Tuchfabrik", Trier, Germany

- 1998 – "Chernobyl", Ministry of Environment, Mainz, Germany

"Transgression", Mill Gallery, Kalai, Britain
"Transgression", Folli gallery, Lancaster, Britain

- 2000 – "Endless photography", gallery "RA", Kiev, Ukraine

Action "Art as a celebration", Irpin, Ukraine

- 2001 – "Contemporary art", "Art Club 44", Kiev, Ukraine
- 2002 – Gallery "Dim Mikoli", Kiev, Ukraine

"Autobiography from the third person", gallery "Dim Mikoli", Kiev, Ukraine

- 2003 – Action "Cry in the Water", Irpin, Ukraine

"Pisannitsy", gallery Art Center on Kostelnaja, "Fotobienale" month of photography in Kiev, Ukraine
"Pisannitsy", Sovereign Duma in Moscow, Russia

- 2004 – Action "Cry in the Sky", Irpin, Ukraine
- 2005 – "Ukraine through the eyes of Ukraine", gallery "RA-photo", "Fotobienale" month of photography in Kiev, Ukraine

"Ukraine through the eyes of Ukraine", Ministry cabinet, Kiev, Ukraine

- 2006 – "Chernobyl–20", Harvard University, Washington, New-York, USA

"Borderland", Ukrainian Institute USA, New York City
"The Human Experience Twenty Years Later", Woodrow Wilson Center, Washington, USA
"It was always this way", Center of Contemporary Art "Solvay", Kraków, Poland
"Color of Hope", Cabinet of Ministers, Kiev, Ukraine

- 2010 – "Reality of the “phenomenon"”, gallery of the Lithuanian Photographers’ Union, Vilnius, Lithuania

Participated in over 40 joint exhibitions in Ukraine, Russia, the United Arab Emirates, Germany, Belarus, Slovakia and France.

== Group exhibitions ==
- 1988 – "The Hot Trace". The Palace of Youth. Moscow, Soviet Union.

"The Hot Trace". "Metropol" gallery. Minsk, Soviet Union.

- 1991 – Exhibition of the Ukrainian Artists' Union. Culture Centre. Kiev, Ukraine.
- 1994 – "Three Perspectives". Town Hall. Menden, Germany.

"The Ukrainian Photography Today". Catholic Academy. Schwerte, Germany.
"Photoartists of Kiev". Museum "Kyiv Fortress". Kyiv, Ukraine.
"Ukrpressphoto-95". The Ukrainian House. Kiev, Ukraine.

- 1995 – "Cherkassy-95". Exhibition Hall of Ukrainian Artists' Union. Cherkasy, Ukraine.

"Ukrpressphoto-95". "Gart" gallery. Yuzhnoukrainsk, Ukraine.
"7 x 7". Photogallery "Na uzvozi". Kiev, Ukraine.

- 1996 – "Ukrpressphoto-96". The Ukrainian House. Kiev, Ukraine.

"Vision Art". National Art Museum of Ukraine. Kiev, Ukraine.
"All Ukrainian Exhibition". Ukrainian State Museum of Great Patriotic War History. Kiev, Ukraine.
"Ukrpressphoto-96". Photogallery "Na uzvozi". Kiev, Ukraine.

- 1997 – "Blitz Exhibition". The Artsyz Gallery". Kiev, Ukraine.

"Imprese". Ivano-Frankivsk, Ukraine.
"The UFO". The Ukrainian House. Kiev, Ukraine.
"Artist League". Photogallery "Eksar". Kiev, Ukraine.
"Without words". Photogallery "Eksar. Kiev, Ukraine.
"Mesiac Photografie". Bratislava, Slovakia.

- 2003 – "Defining Dictionary", Kiev, Ukraine

"Photo session", Soviart gallery, Kiev, Ukraine
"Position", Lavra gallery, Kiev, Ukraine
"Ukraine in focus", "Gorod N" gallery, Kiev, Ukraine

- 2006 – "Once upon a time Chernobyl", Centre de Cultura Contemporània de Barcelona (CCCB), Barcelona, Spain

"Chernobyl–20", New-York, USA
"Chernobyl–20", Washington, USA
"Orange moment", Ukrainian House, Kiev, Strasburg

== Curator work ==
- 1997 – "Lege Artist", photo gallery "Eksar", Kiev, Ukraine
- 1998 – "Paradzhanov", photography by A. Vladimirov, photo gallery "Eksar", Kiev, Ukraine

"Children of revolution", photographed by A. Chekmenev, photo gallery "Eksar", Kiev, Ukraine
"Pornography", photography by E. Pavlov, photo gallery "Eksar", Kiev, Ukraine
"Incarnation", photography by E. Martinyuk, photo gallery "Eksar", Kiev, Ukraine
"Poetical landscape", photo gallery "Eksar", Kiev, Ukraine
"Skill of image conservation", photo gallery "Eksar", Kiev, Ukraine
"Body, photo gallery “Eksar", Kiev, Ukraine
"No comment" photo gallery "Eksar", Kiev, Ukraine
"Presence effect", photo gallery "Eksar", Kiev, Ukraine

- 1999 – "Deliberate reality", photography by O. Polisyuk, photo gallery "Eksar", Kiev, Ukraine
- 2002 – "Through this air the God is looking at me", photography by Ivan Zhdanov (Russia), photo gallery "Eksar", Kiev, Ukraine
- 2003 – "Position", gallery "Lavra", Fotobienale – 2003 "Month of photography in Kiev", Kiev, Ukraine

== Competitions ==
- First all-union slide-festival "Kharkiv-90" – First prize
- National contest of documentary pictures "Ukrpressphoto-94" – First prize
- National contest of documentary pictures "Ukrpressphoto-94" – First, third and special prizes
- "Photographer of the year", annals "Academia" – first prize
- Blitz-contest photo festival "Artsyz-97”

== Collections ==
- Photography fund, Moscow, Russia
- Kunstmuseum Bonn (or Bonn Museum of Modern Art), Bonn, Germany
- Latvian Museum of Photography, Riga, Latvia
- National Historical Museum of Ukraine
- History museum in Kiev
- Lancaster University, Great Britain

== Sources ==
- Yuri Kosin.Transgression// Kyiv, Ukraine, 2019
- Yuri Kosin. Ukraine through the eyes of Ukraine // K .: SPD FO Chaltsev, 2005
