= Alexander Kostetsky =

Ukrainian painter and sculptor (1954–2010)

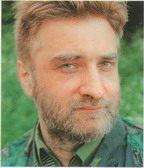
- Born: November 14, 1954; Kiev, Ukraine
- Died: January 4, 2010 (aged 55); Kyiv, Ukraine
- Education: Kyiv State Arts Institute
- Known for: Painting, Sculpture
- Website: www.akostetsky.com

Alexander Kostetsky (Russ. Александр Владимирович Костецкий, Ukr. Олександр Володимирович Костецький;, November 14, 1954 in Kiev – January 4, 2010 in Kyiv) was a Ukrainian painter and sculptor. His name has various transliterations into English and variants include Aleksandr Kostetsky, Alexander Kostecky, Alexander Kostetski and Aleksandr Kosteckij. His art style is Magic Realism, Fantastic art.

== Biography ==
Kostetsky was born into a family of artists on 14 November 1954 in the Ukrainian capital of Kiev. His father was the academician painter Vladimir Kostetsky and his mother the sculptor Galina Novokreshchenova. He was the grandson of the biologist Nikolai Danilovich Kostetsky. He developed his artistic talent under the guidance of his parents and attended the Shevchenko State Art School in Kiev, where he graduated in 1975. He extended his studies at the National Academy of Visual Arts and Architecture in Kiev and graduated it in 1979 before beginning work in an art workshow. During the repressive Soviet period, when artists needed state approval to exhibit in official galleries, he participated in underground art shows. He travelled widely in Ukraine and also visited the Caucasus and Central Asia. In 1988 he visited the United States with his first wife Helen Granova and was able to place his art in exhibitions in New York City, Washington, Philadelphia and other cities. Some of his paintings were bought by Norton Dodge's personal museum and are still on display there. He also painted icons for Eastern Orthodox churches in New York. Up to 1995 he regularly held exhibitions in the United States.

In 1998 he published an album of his prints in Kyiv. It was edited by his second wife, a teacher and mathematician, who also wrote the introduction. He continued to hold regular exhibitions in Kyiv, usually in the gallery "Nef" in Laurel, where some of his work is on permanent display. In 2001 he visited the United States again to exhibit his art and in 2003 he exhibited in the German city of Mannheim. In November 2003 he was made a member of the Union of Artists of Ukraine. He continued to travel widely, visiting Egypt in 2007 and also India and Nepal. However, he began to suffer from problems with his heart and lungs, and he died January 4, 2010, at his home in Ukraine aged only 55.

== Work ==
During his childhood, Kostetsky began to create a distinctive style based on his love of mysterious alien civilizations and science fiction. At school he worked on sculpture, learning from his sculptor mother, and in the seventh grade he created a set of chess pieces intricately carved like medieval knights. Later he sculpted in clay, porcelain and other materials. At Kiev Art School and the Kiev State Institute, he began to master different styles of drawing in the style of the old masters. At the same time he developed his own style and technique of oil painting, wishing to capture his unique artistic visions. However, while studying at the institute, the young Kostetsky had to obey to the canons of socialist realism and his early works do not always reflect his true interests. His heart was with friends in underground movement. In 1977, Alexander took part in an unofficial art exhibition by the art association «Rukh» («Movement») along with such artists as Yuri Kosin, Mykola Trehub, Vudon Baklitsky, Nicholas Zalevsky, Olena Golub and others.
