= Underground culture =

Alternative cultures that differ from the mainstream

Underground culture, or simply underground, is a term to describe various alternative cultures which either consider themselves different from the mainstream of society and culture, or are considered so by others. The word "underground" is used because there is a history of resistance movements under harsh regimes where the term underground was employed to refer to the necessary secrecy of the resisters.

For example, the Underground Railroad was a network of clandestine routes by which African slaves in the 19th-century United States attempted to escape to freedom. The phrase "underground railroad" was resurrected and applied in the 1960s to the extensive network of draft counseling groups and houses used to help Vietnam War-era draft dodgers escape to Canada, and was also applied in the 1970s to the clandestine movement of people and goods by the American Indian Movement in and out of occupied Native American reservation lands. (See also: Wounded Knee Occupation).

The filmmaker Rosa von Praunheim documented the legendary New York underground scene in the 1970s around Andy Warhol in some of his films, for example in Underground and Emigrants (1976) and Tally Brown, New York (1979). Since then, the term has come to designate various subcultures such as mod culture, hippie culture, punk culture, techno music/rave culture and underground hip hop.

== Terminology ==
The unmodified term "The underground" was a common name for World War II resistance movements. It was later applied to counter-cultural movements, many of which sprang up in the United States during the 1960s.

== History ==
The 1960s and 1970s underground cultural movements had some connections to the Beat Generation, which had, in turn, been inspired by the French author philosophers, artists, and poets as Louis-Ferdinand Céline or the Existentialist movement, which gathered around Jean-Paul Sartre and Albert Camus in Paris during the years that followed the aftermath of World War II. Sartre and Camus were members of Combat, a French resistance group formed in 1942 by Henri Frenay. Frenay, Sartre, and Camus were all involved in publishing underground newspapers for the resistance. The French intellectuals which inspired underground american author as Jack Kerouac, Allen Ginsberg and William Burroughs in North America in the 1940s was steeped in socialist thinking before the Cold War began.

In the Esquire magazine (1958), Jack Kerouac stated:

The same thing was almost going on in the postwar France of Sartre and Genet and what's more we knew about it—But as to the actual existence of a Beat Generation, chances are it was really just an idea in our minds—We'd stay up 24 hours drinking cup after cup of black coffee, playing record after record of Wardell Gray, Lester Young, Dexter Gordon, Willie Jackson, Lennie Tristano and all the rest, talking madly about that holy new feeling out there in the streets—We'd write stories about some strange beatific Negro hepcat saint with goatee hitchhiking across Iowa with taped up horn bringing the secret message of blowing to other coasts, other cities, like a veritable Walter the Penniless leading an invisible First Crusade—We had our mystic heroes and wrote, nay sung novels about them, erected long poems celebrating the new 'angels' of the American underground—In actuality there was only a handful of real hip swinging cats and what there was vanished mightily swiftly during the Korean War when (and after) a sinister new kind of efficiency appeared in America, maybe it was the result of the universalization of Television and nothing else (the Polite Total Police Control of Dragnet's 'peace' officers) but the beat characters after 1950 vanished into jails and madhouses, or were shamed into silent conformity, the generation itself was shortlived and small in number.

== Modern day ==
Today, many aspects of underground culture have become more accessible and commercialized, often losing their original spirit. Niche music genres, fashion styles, and art forms are now widely marketed to mainstream audiences, which can dilute their authenticity.

Moreover, the ease of access to cultural products online has blurred the lines between underground and mainstream. Consequently, what was once considered "underground" is now often integrated into popular culture, resulting in a loss of the exclusivity and community that originally defined these movements.

== See also ==
- Alternative culture
- Church of the SubGenius
- Counterculture
- Cult following
- Cyberpunk
- English underground
- History of subcultures in the 20th century
- Notes from Underground
- Neopaganism
- Prague Underground
- Soviet Nonconformist Art
- Ukrainian underground
- UK Underground (1960s)
- UK Underground (2020s)
- Underground comix
- Underground film
- Underground Literary Alliance
- Underground music
- Underground press
