= Latvian Museum of Photography =

Museum in Riga, Latvia

Coordinates: 56.9464°N 24.1103°E

- Latvijas Fotogrāfijas muzejs
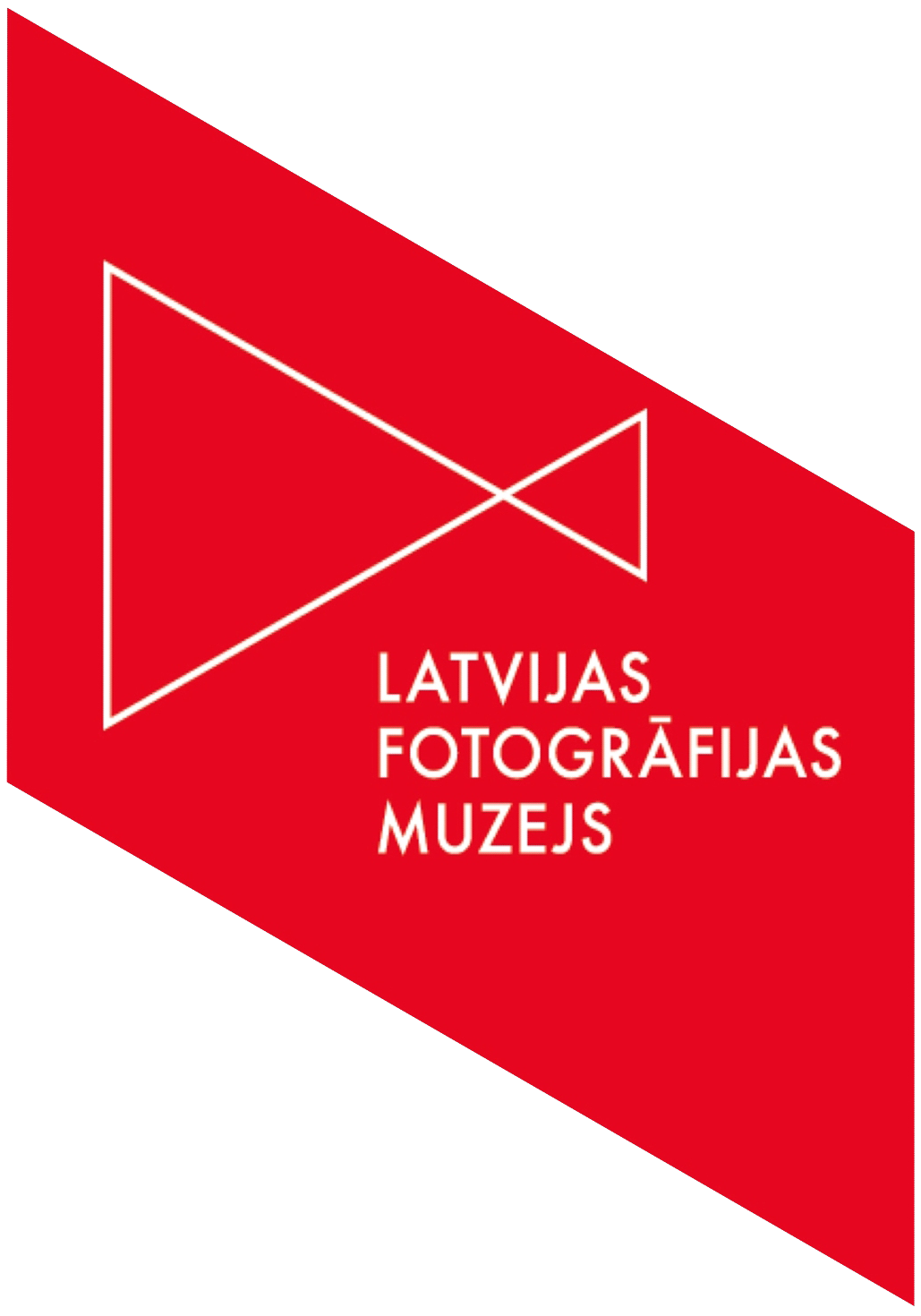

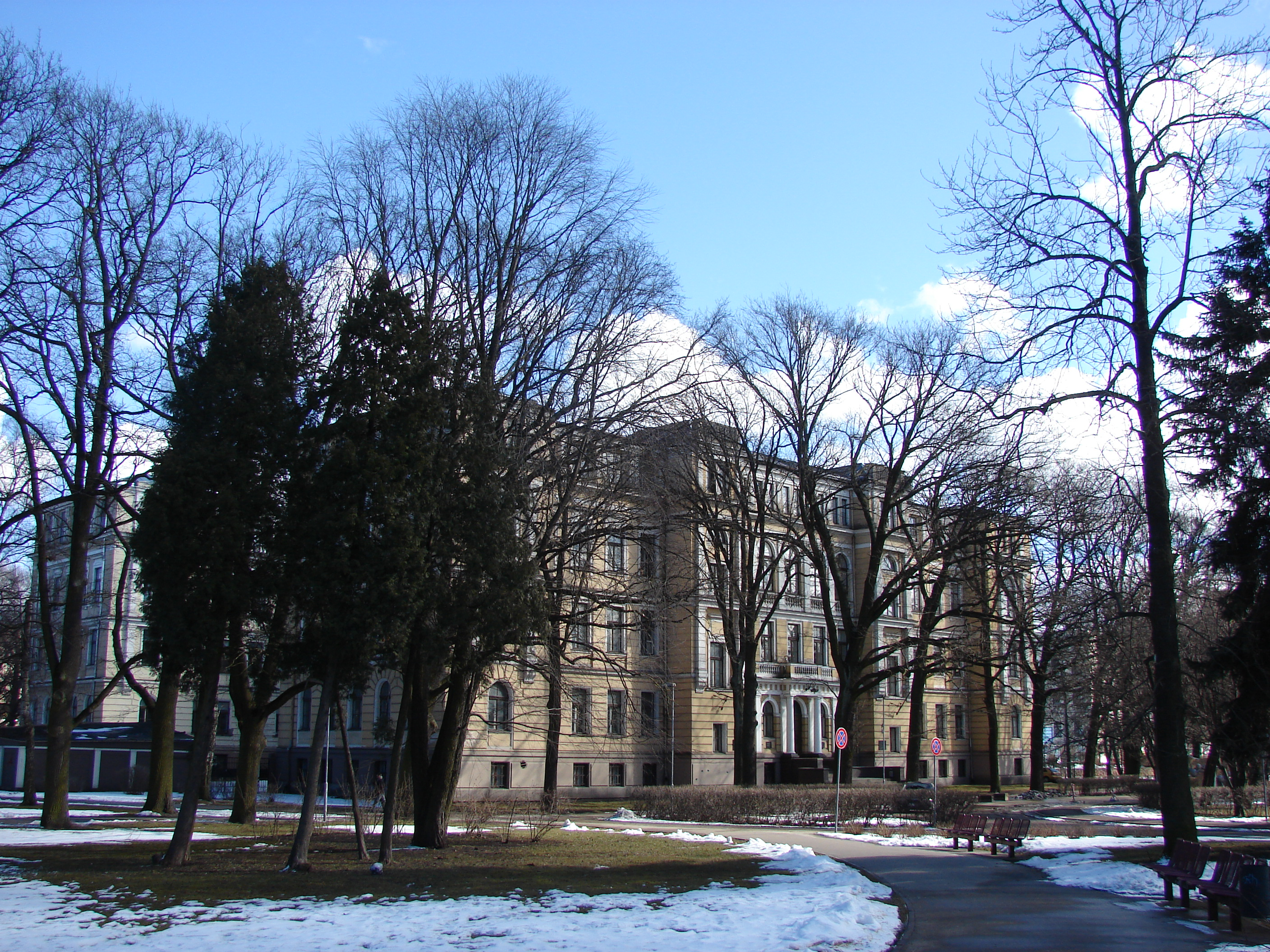
- The temporary home of the museum at 4 Kronvalda Boulevard, as of 2023
- Established: 18 May 1993
- Location: Riga
- Collection size: 70,000
- Director: Antija Erdmane-Hermane
- Owner: Museum of the History of Riga and Navigation
- Website: rigamuz.lv/lfm/en

The Latvian Museum of Photography is the only memory institution in Latvia dedicated to the medium of photography. The museum offers a full range of research opportunities, including the collection, archives and library.

== History ==
In 1993, the museum was opened as a division of the Museum of the History of Riga and Navigation in an old Riga merchant's house at 8 Marstalu Street. On 18 May 1993, the permanent exhibition "The History of Latvian Photography. 1839-1941" was opened to the public, presenting the development of Latvian photography chronologically. The author of the exhibition was Pēteris Korsaks, and the first head of the museum was Vilnis Auziņš.

At the end of 2023, the museum moved to temporary premises at 4 Kronvalda Boulevard. A public space has been created there, which is being developed as an area for learning, research and discussion about photography in Latvia.

== Collections ==
The Latvian Museum of Photography's collection comprises nearly 70,000 items, including glass plates, film negatives, slides and photographs, as well as postcards, albums and photographic equipment. The Museum's objects are organised in collections.

One of the largest collections in the Latvian Museum of Photography is the Strenči Photo Workshop glass plate collection (13 000 items). In 2021, this collection was included in the Latvian National Register of the UNESCO Memory of the World Programme. The plates document life in Strenči from 1920 to 1950. The photographic workshop itself was active until around 1970, with photographers such as Dāvis Spunde, Jānis Ziemeļnieks, his sister Paulīne Kraukle and his brother Konrāds Krauklis.
