= Kniazhychi =

Village in Ukraine

Coordinates: 50°27′45″N 30°47′01″E

Kniazhychi (Ukrainian: Княжичі; Russian: Княжичи; Polish: Kniażyci) is a village in the Kyiv Oblast (province) of northern Ukraine. The village has a population of 5202. The total area of land within the administrative boundaries of Kniazhychi village council is 3669.3 hectares.

== History ==
The origins of the village can be traced to the son of one of the ruling Kniaz i.e. Duke or King, Prince (Kniazhych) had land with little palace built on it. Soon a little village was grown around the palace and got its present name Kniazhychi.

The first known record of the name Kniazhychi can be found in a letter written by the Polish king Kazimierz to the Kyiv governor Yuriy Pats on July 7, 1489.

== Geography ==
The village is located in the southwest of Brovarsky district. From the west the village has a common border with the city of Kyiv.
