= English underground =

Branch in England's history of music

The English underground is a branch in England's history of art, especially the musical traditions. It usually refers to popular musicians who have benefited from acquiring the sensibility of native English folk song, as that tradition has been passed down through the generations, often without any formal conveyance. It was first identified by the neo-romantic historian E. P. Thompson in 1963, in his The Making of the English Working Class:

And we must also remember the 'underground' of the ballad singer and the fairground which handed on traditions to the nineteenth century (to the music hall, or Dickens' circus folk or Hardy's pedlars and showmen); for in these ways the 'inarticulate' [masses of people] conserve certain values—a spontaneity and capacity for enjoyment and mutual loyalties—despite the inhibiting pressures of magistrates, mill-owners, and Methodists.

The phrase was used, in a wider cultural sense, in Jonathon Green's book Days in the Life: Voices from the English Underground, 1961–1971, a collection of first-hand accounts of the 1960s counterculture that often drew on carnivalesque and music hall traditions and styles.

The term is now often used among educated music fans, to identify a songwriting tradition which is usually taken to have arisen in the past fifty years, via the work of Syd Barrett, Robert Wyatt and Nick Drake. The Wire magazine also regularly applies the term to the gothic-tinged, neo-romantic post-industrial music of Throbbing Gristle, Psychic TV, Coil, Current 93 and others, calling it "a shadowy scene whose work accents peculiarities of Englishness through the links and affinities they've forged with earlier generations of the island's marginals and outsiders".
