= Museum of Russian Art (New Jersey) =

Museum in Jersey City, New Jersey

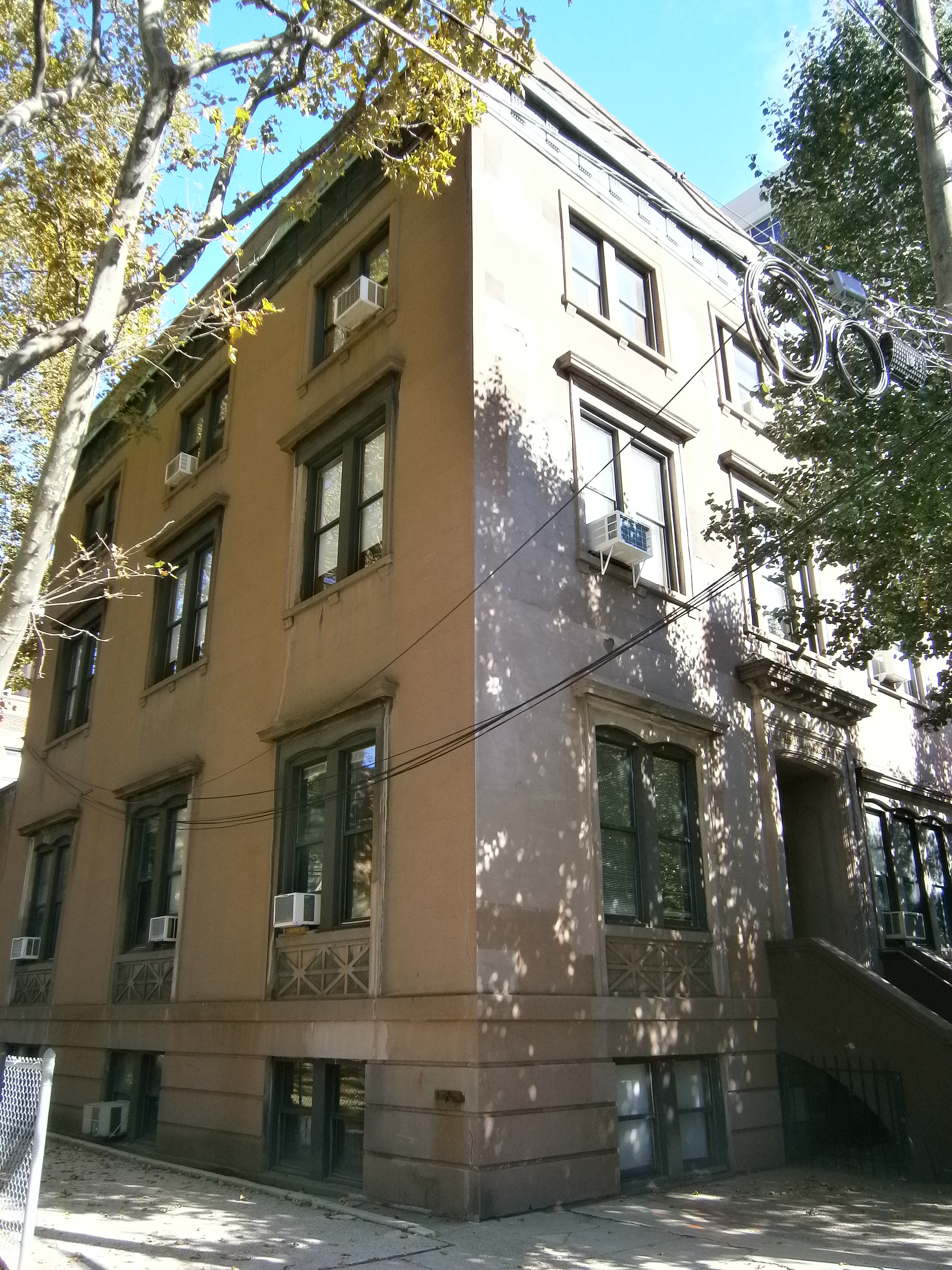
- Museum of Russian Art
- Former name: CASE Museum of Contemporary Russian Art
- Location: Jersey City, New Jersey
- Coordinates: 40°42′57″N 74°2′24″W
- Type: Art Museum
- Website: moramuseum.org

The Museum of Russian Art (MoRA) is a museum in Jersey City, New Jersey. It is dedicated to exhibiting Russian art, particularly Soviet Nonconformist Art. It was established in 1980 as CASE Museum of Contemporary Russian Art (the name including the abbreviation for the Committee for the Absorption of Soviet Emigres.) The museum's historic brownstone building in Paulus Hook underwent renovation and re-opened in 2010.

== See also ==
- Bulldozer Exhibition
- Exhibitions in Hudson County
- Jersey City Museum
- Mana Contemporary
- Norton and Nancy Dodge Collection of Soviet Nonconformist Art
