= Vysheslavskyi =

Vysheslavskyi or Vysheslavsky, feminine: Vysheslavska is a surname. Notable people with the surname include:

- Hlib Vysheslavskyi (born 1962), birth name of Glib Viches, Ukrainian artist and art historian
- Irina Vysheslavska (born February 20, 1939) is a Ukrainian artist, painter, graphic artist and set designer
- Leonid Vysheslavskyi (1914 – 2002) was a Ukrainian poet, literary critic and translator

== See also ==
- Vysheslavtsev
- Vysheslavskoye
- Vysheslav
- Visheslav
- Vysheslavia
