= Irina Gabiani =

Georgia-born Italian and Luxembourgish visual artist

- Born: January 2, 1971 (age 55); Tbilisi, Georgia
- Citizenship: Italy; Luxembourg
- Education: Tbilisi State Academy of Arts; Gerrit Rietveld Academie
- Known for: Painting, drawing, collage, installation, video, performance
- Website: www.irinagabiani.com

Irina Gabiani (born 1971) is a Georgia-born Italian and Luxembourgish visual artist based in Luxembourg. She studied at the Tbilisi State Academy of Arts and later at the Gerrit Rietveld Academie in Amsterdam. Her work explores the interplay between the microcosm and the macrocosm, examining the hidden structures of existence, the perception of reality, and the fluidity of time and space.

Works by Gabiani are held in public collections including Georgian National Museum, Tbilisi, the National Library of Georgia, Tbilisi, Villa Croce Museum of Contemporary Art, Genoa, and Art Palace of Georgia – Museum of Cultural History, Tbilisi

== Artistic practice ==
Gabiani works with drawing, painting, collage, installation, video, and performance. A recurring element in her practice is the use of images sourced from contemporary magazines, which she reworks by adding hand-drawn lines and extending selected motifs across multiple figures or surfaces. This method of serial repetition has been described in exhibition catalogues and press reviews as forming visual chains and cyclical structures.

== Video art ==
Gabiani has been active in video art since the early 2000s, often combining experimental visuals with philosophical and cosmological themes.

=== Selected video works and screenings ===
- Never Cross the Same River Twice Kunstverein Kärnten Goethepark, Klagenfurt, Austria (30 April – 9 June 2022).
- Whispering for Freedom, Peace Letters to Ukraine program, The New Museum of Networked Art, Cologne, Germany (2022).
- Sinestesia Universale (videos with music by Ruggero Laganà), Conservatorio di Milano, Milano, Italy (2017).
- TIME is Love – International Video Art Program at ZKM Center for Art and Media Karlsruhe (2017).
- Unrolling the Universe (solo exhibition), Art Museum of Georgia, Tbilisi (2016).
- HearteartH Berlin-Milan (Berliner Liste and [.BOX] Milan)(2016).
- TIME is Love international video art program Abacus (2:24, 2013), Torrance Art Museum, California (August 23 – October 18, 2014).
- Time is Love, co-organized by SCCA-Ljubljana and Kolektiva Institute at Photon Gallery, Ljubljana, Slovenia (May 20, 2014).
- Take off Your Veil – Judges’ Prize Winner, International Video Festival “Letters from the Sky” (2011).
- Sguardi Sonori festival, Museo della Civiltà Romana, Rome (2010–2011).
- Video presentation at the National Library of Georgia, Tbilisi (2010).
- Video Dia Loghi series, Velan Centre for Contemporary Art, Torino, Italy (2008–2012, multiple editions, including Video Dia Loghi 2008 and Counting the Infinite in Video Dia Loghi 12).

== Exhibitions ==
Gabiani has participated in solo and group exhibitions at institutions including:

- Villa Croce Museum of Contemporary Art, Genoa (2022, 2024).
- Mudam – Musée d’Art Moderne Grand-Duc Jean, Luxembourg (2022)
- CAPC – Musée d'Art Contemporain de Bordeaux (2017)
- ZKM Center for Art and Media, Karlsruhe (2017)
- Torrance Art Museum (2014)
- National Library of Georgia, Tbilisi (2010).
- 54th Venice Biennale, Arsenale (2011) – representing Italy.
- Museo della Civiltà Romana, Rome (2010)
- Georgian National Museum, Tbilisi (2009–2016)

Selected recent solo exhibitions include:

- Every Object in the Sky Looks Like a Star, Galleria Raffaella De Chirico Arte Contemporanea, Milan (2026)
- Portraying the Universe, Nosbaum Reding Projects, Luxembourg (2025)
- Minimal‑Complexity, Galerie PJ, Metz, France (2024)
- Théâtre Intérieur, Galerie PJ, Metz, France (2021)
- Across the Universe, Raffaella De Chirico Arte Contemporanea, Turin (2019)
- Unrolling the human body, Trois C‑L – Centre de Création Chorégraphique Luxembourgeois, Luxembourg (2017)
- Unrolling the Universe, Georgian National Museum, Tbilisi (2016)
- Micro e Macro cosmi, Galleria Giampiero Biasutti, Torino, Italy (29 May – July 2015).

Her work has been presented at international art fairs including Art Beijing, ARCOmadrid, Art Busan, and Bienvenue Art Fair (Paris).

== Awards and recognition ==
- Represented Italy at the 54th Venice Biennale (2011)
- International Video Festival “Letters from the Sky”, Judges’ Prize Winner (2011)
- Arte Laguna Prize, Best Foreign Artist (2008)
- Arte Laguna Prize, Virtual Jury Prize (2008)
- In 2008, Gabiani received the third prize in the Video section of the VIII Premio Nazionale d’Arte Città di Novara (Italy) for her work "The Slaves of the System" (2006).
