= Kuskov =

Kuskov (Russian: Кусков) is a Russian masculine surname, its feminine counterpart is Kuskova. It may refer to

- Dmitry Kuskov (1876–1956), Russian sports shooter
- Ivan Kuskov (1765–1823), Russian explorer
- Sergey Kuskov (1957–2008), Russian curator
- Yanina Kuskova (born 2001), Uzbekistani racing cyclist
- Yekaterina Kuskova (1869–1958), Russian economist, journalist and politician
