= Olena Golub =

Ukrainian contemporary artist (born 1951)

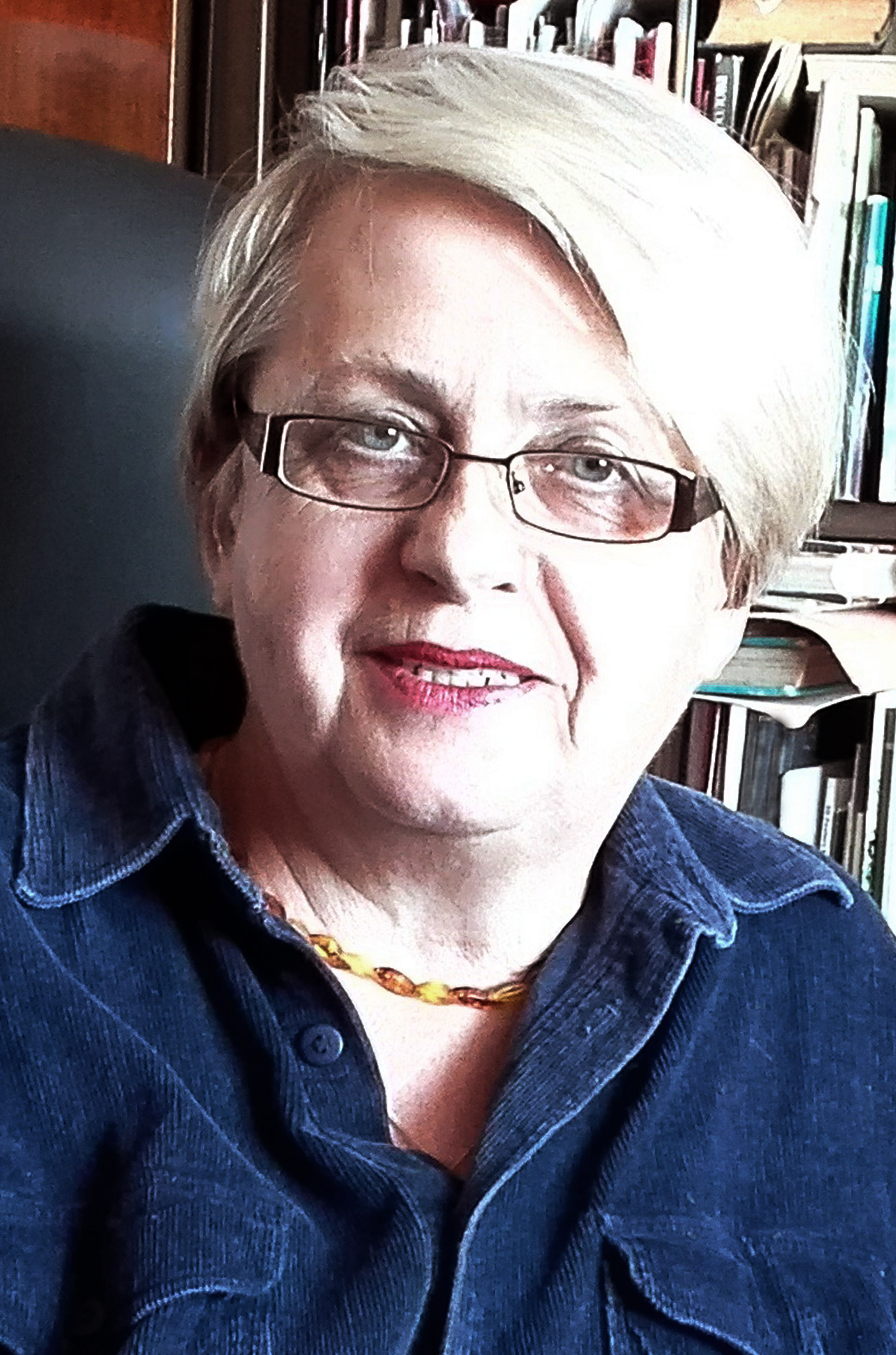
- Golub in 2017
- Born: December 25, 1951 (age 74); Kyiv, Soviet Ukraine
- Education: Kyiv University
- Occupations: Painter, digital image maker, art critic

Olena Golub or Holub (Ukrainian: Олена Євгенівна Голуб; born December 25, 1951, in Kyiv) is a Ukrainian contemporary artist, digital artist, collage artist, painter, art historian, writer, representative of Ukrainian New Wave, member of the National Union of Artists of Ukraine (since 2003). Her works have been exhibited internationally, including Germany, Netherlands, Belgium South Korea, Poland, and Austria. Museums with her art works include the National Art Museum of Ukraine, Museum of the sixties, Taras Shevchenko National Museum and Museum of Pannonhalma Archabbey, Hungary., in Digital collection of the Princeton University Library

== Biography ==
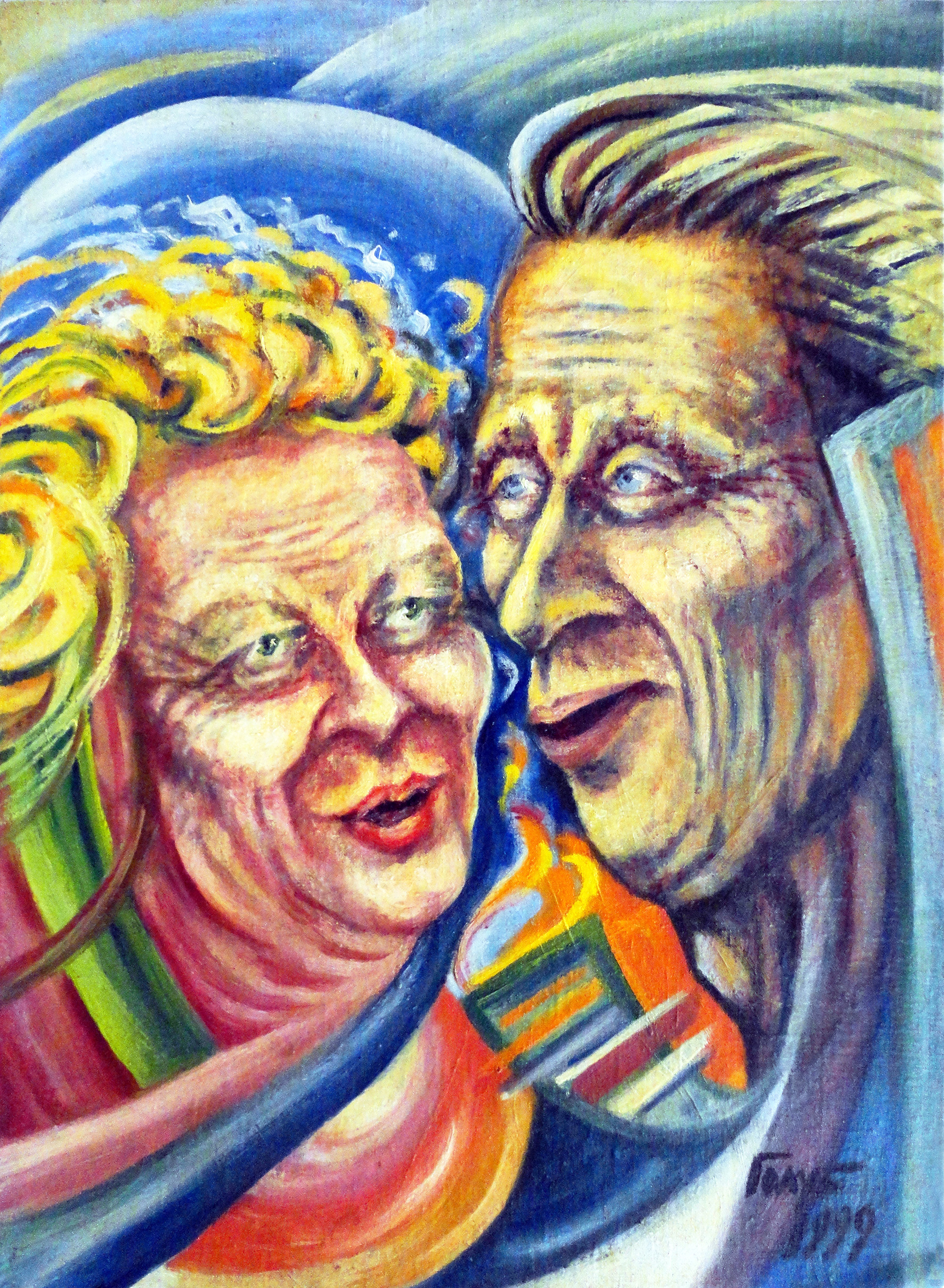
My parents's song. 60х40, 1999.

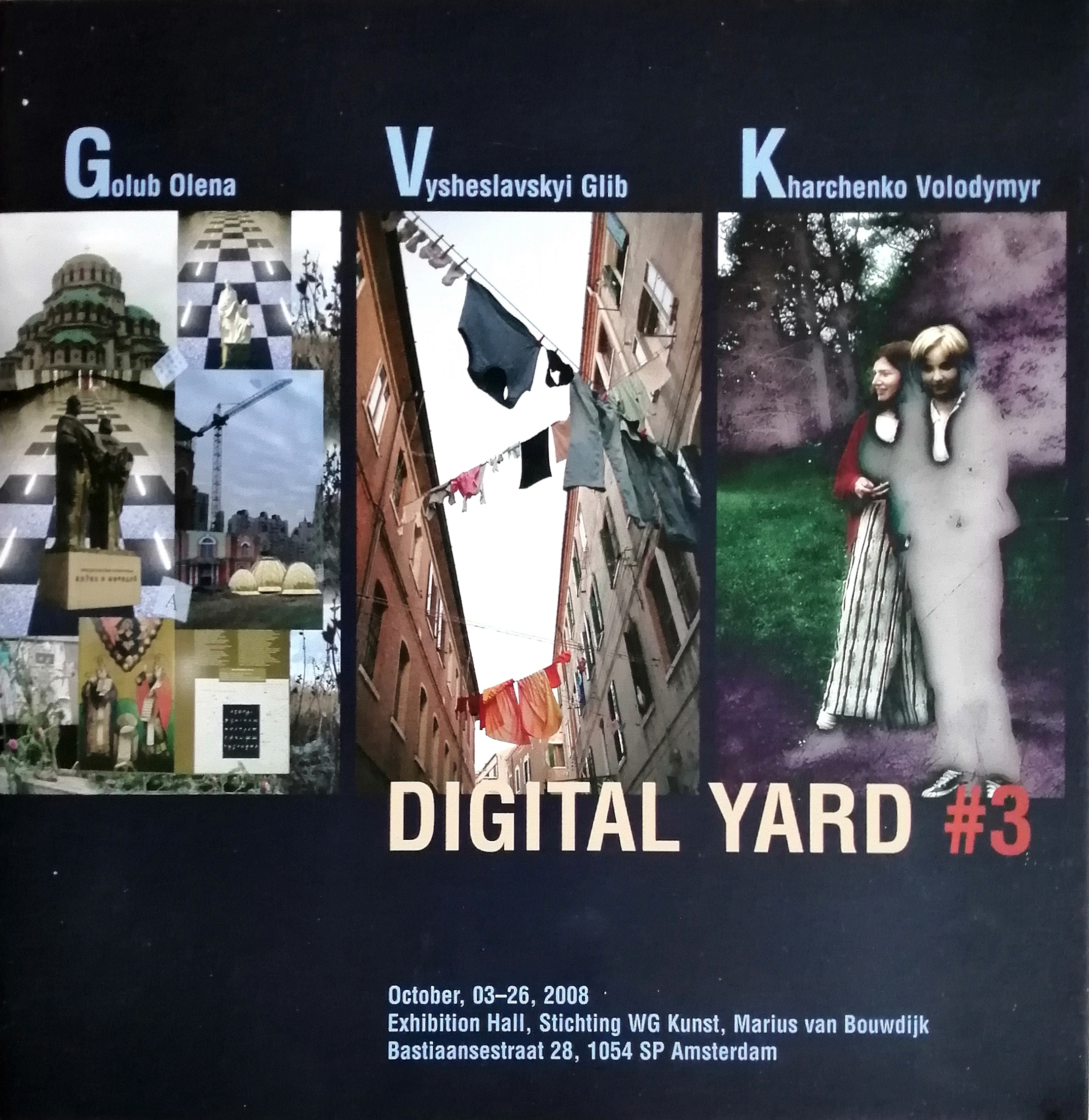
Digital yard №3. Catalogue, 2008.

Olena Golub was born on December 25, 1951, in Kyiv, in Soviet Ukraine, to an intellectual family. Her parents acted on stage as singers before her father, Yevgen Golub, became a journalist and her mother, Zinaida Morozova, became an official.

Golub graduated from Taras Shevchenko University of Kyiv in 1974, department of biophysics. She worked for some time as an engineer, but dreamed of becoming a professional artist. In the 1970s she refused to join the Arts' Academy, against creating compositions in the spirit of Soviet ideology. Thus, she took private drawing lessons from artists (Vasyl Zabashta, Vilen Barskyi, D. Zaruba, and S. Kaplan). In 1986 she graduated from the Institute of Journalistic Skill, Faculty Artists press.

She worked as an illustrator in magazines, and an editor at a publishing house. She is the author of more than 100 publications on contemporary art.

Her husband is culturologist Peter Yakovenko. Нer daughter is photographer Anna Golub. Her son Andriy Yakovenko is a designer and a sportsman in racing fast electric radio-controlled boats.

She lived in Kyiv until 2022. During the Russian-Ukrainian war, she temporarily lives in California, America, as a refugee.

== Artistic career ==
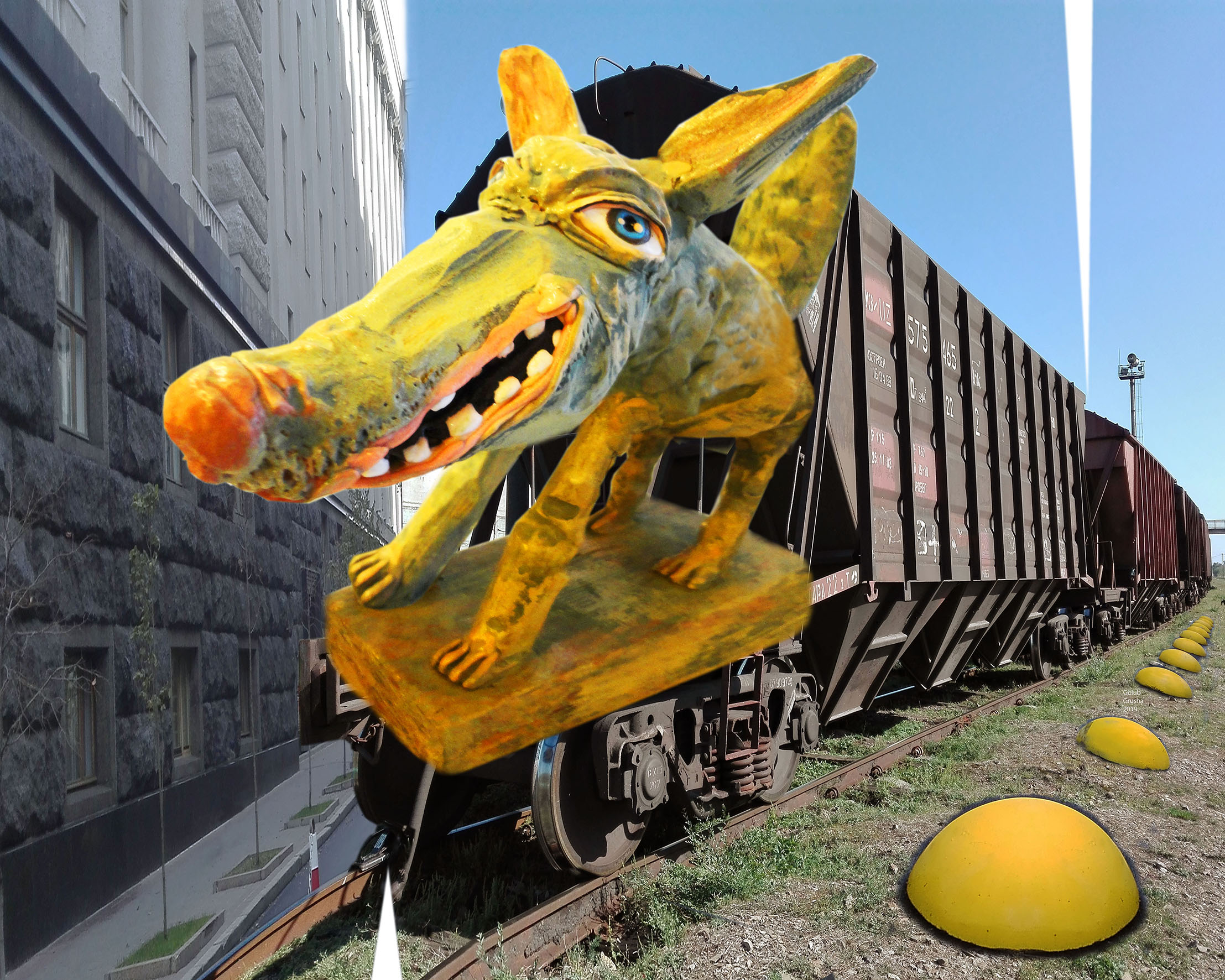
Series 2, digital print, 2019

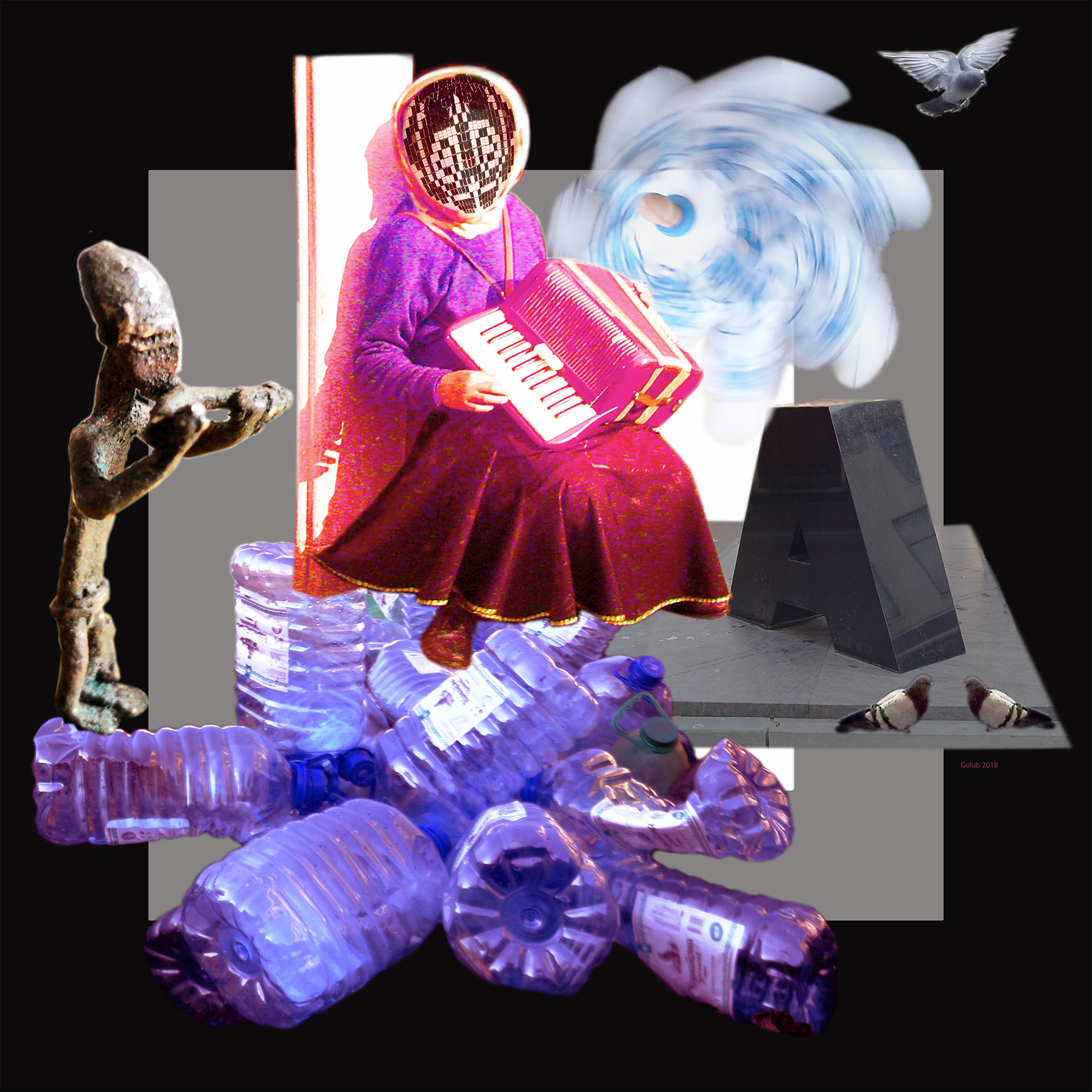
O. Golub. Series: Bronze Age, asphalt period. # 10. Digital collage. 2018.

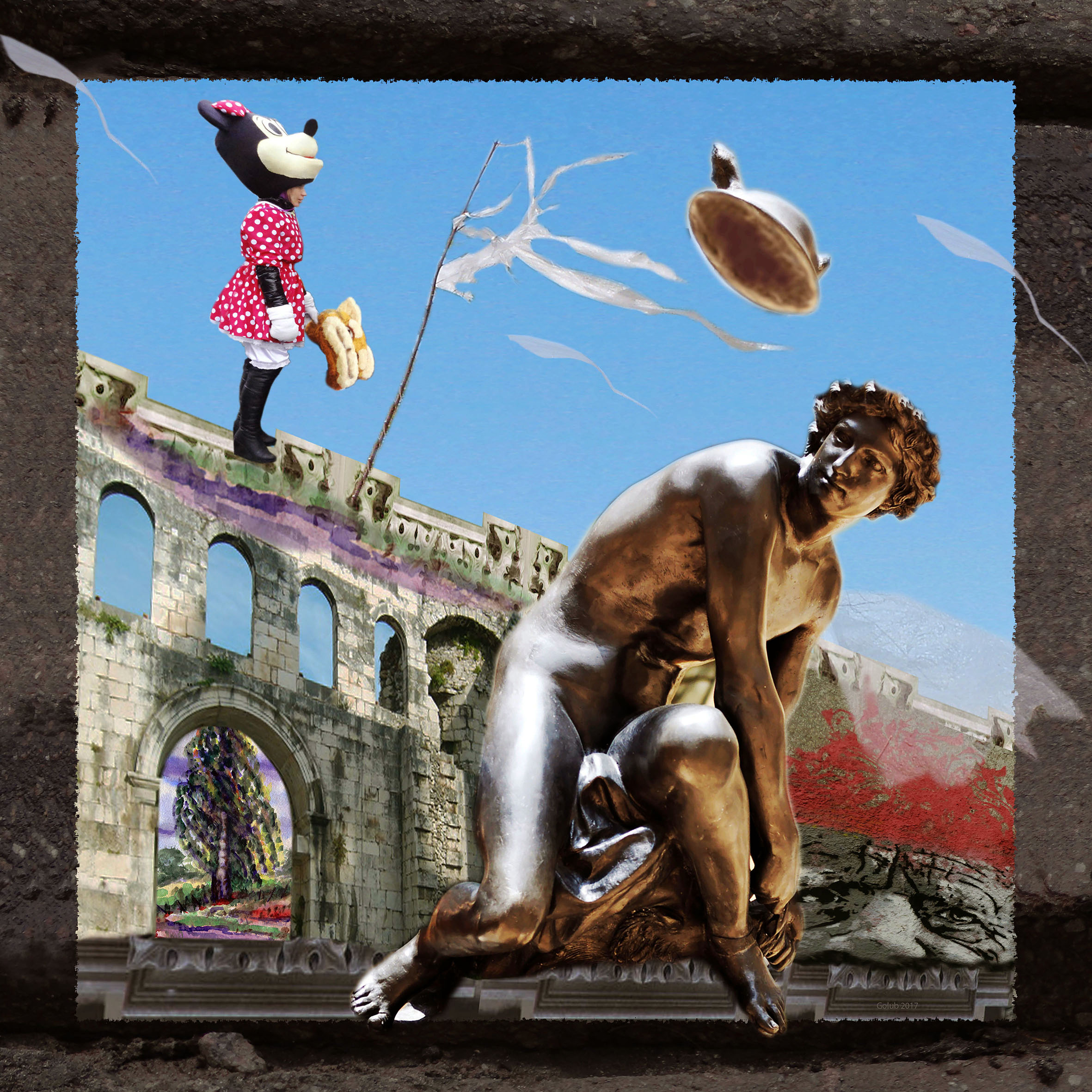
Wind digital print, 2017

Golub's career began with opposition to the Socialist Realism in a circle of underground artists, when she was writing in the style of Expressionism. Avant-garde young people in Kyiv founded an association, the Rukh Movement, in which writers, scientists, and artists gathered. In 1977 they organized an exhibition with artists including Golub, Yuriy Kosin, Nik Niedzelski, Mikola Trehub, Vudon Baklitsky, Alexander Kostetsky, and Nicholas Zalevsky.

Her memories about the underground time and artists were published in the book The Bright and Gloomy days of Underground Artists.

Her artworks were inspired by Ukrainian avant-garde in the beginning of the 20th century, particularly by Wassily Kandinsky (Engineer's portrait, Empty plate, Two, etc.)

The second period in Golub's art career is associated with the revival of civic activities and the advent of private galleries, where she began to exhibit new works. Her paintings such as Aunt, Fisherman, and Chupa-chups, or the illusion of equality increased the social-critical motif with characteristics of Ukrainian humor.

In 2003, Golub began to create photo installations using computer technology. Art critic Nina Sayenko wrote: "Turning to contemporary computer technologies, the artist, as is her custom, pungently felt the pulse and rhythm of the time. By confronting and comparing various historical photographic materials she is in the process of solving philosophical problems of existence itself. The new series features the transformation of family traditions and generational ties along with the global transformation of conscience in material reviewing the totalitarian past (Yes and No, The Totalitarian Ballade, and Recipient Unknown). Olena Golub calls upon us to return to human problems and perception of the human essence. In her works the fates of historical persons (Stalin, Hitler, etc) are closely interlaced with personages from family albums, who act together in the historical context. They pose questions about everybody's connection with and responsibility for everything that ever happened or is happening now (Who to Be With? and He, She, They...). Today Olena Golub is on a new turn in her creative flight. One cannot but wish to become one of the characters she has created, the Yellow Hare, rising high above our omnivorous globalization and broad expansion of the mass media and fill oneself with the sense of freedom and independence."

In 2003, Golub began to create photo installations using computer technology. She frequently returned to human problems and reworked historical figures. Today, she continues working with new ideas, encompassing globalization in her work.

She has found considerable opportunities to create own visual language using digital technology and based on "mental structures", as she says.

A trend accentuated on digital technology in the arts she realized in the G. V. Kh. – group: Golub, Hlib Vysheslavskyi, Kharchenko. Their project "Digital yard № 3" was shown in Amsterdam, the Netherlands (2008).

Olena has often participated in the international media exhibitions "Matrix" HEAA, and in 2019 she became a member of this association until 2022. On the HEAA president Ágnes HAász's invitation she went to Budapest with a solo exhibition (curators Denes Ruzsa and Fruzsina Spitzer).

The Hungarian art critic Gabor Pataki noted:

"She calls her method as «narrative constructivism», in which you can see the embodiment of the ideas of the photomontage discoverers Rodchenko, Klutsis and Lissitzky. But while her predecessors constructed their works believing in a world that would soon become better and fairer, Golub can only acknowledge all these ideas as unsuccessful."

With the beginning of the Russo-Ukrainian War in 2022 O. Golub expresses her civic position with a series of anti-war digital works and participates in exhibitions in Ukraine, Bulgaria, France and publishes articles.

In 2023 she participates in the exhibition «Slava Ukraini! Ukrainian art during the war», Wesel, Germany.

=== Awards ===
- Award 2nd place of “Passion”, San Fernando Valley Arts & Cultural Center, Southern California (SFVACC/SCORE)
- Laureate of the award National Union of Artists of Ukraine name Platon Biletsky 2021
- Award – 3rd prize (Marcil Lavallée Prize) to O. Golub, Ukraine, for Keys, Ottawa, Canada, 2020
- Award-certificate of merit of "Matrices 2017" – International exhibitions of small electrographic artworks, Budapest, Hungary, 2017
- Award of "Matrices 2012" – International exhibitions of small electrographic artworks, Budapest, Hungary, 2012, in category "Hommage a Nicolas Schöffer"

=== Main book ===
- Olena Golub. The Bright and Gloomy days of Underground Artists. Biography of two artists not recognized during their lifetime, with comments. Kyiv, Published House "Antiquary", 2017, 272 pages, illustrations. ISBN 978-617-7285-11-2
- Olena Golub. The Bright and Gloomy days of Underground Artists. Kyiv, PH "Antiquary", 2017

=== Exhibitions ===
- 2025 — TRYST International Art Fair, Torrance Art Museum, in the project “Wartime-Lifetime” by the Open O’pen$ group (Oleg Kharch, Olena Golub, Andriy Budnyk, Glib Viches, Volodymyr Kharchenko, Rene van Kempen).
- 2023 — «Slava Ukraini! Ukrainian art during the war», Wesel, Germany
- 2022 — Identity. Aspects of modern photography in Ukraine. Apollonia, Strasbourg. 2022
- 2020 — International exhibition ART IN THE TIME OF PLAGUE
- 2020 — "Artificial Intelligence" – International Digital Miniprint Exhibition 15 Ottawa, Canada
- 2018 — "Time spasm" the International Digital Art Miniprint Exhibition 13, Ottawa, Canada
- 2017 — 12 International Digital Art Miniprint Exhibition, Ottawa, Canada
- 2017 — an exhibition of electrographic art, Pannonhalma abbey museum and gallery, Pannonhalma, Hungary
- 2017 — "Matrices 2017" – International Exhibition of Small Form Elektrographic Art, Budapest, Hungary, catalogue p. 50, 71
- 2017 — Revolution of Dignity Art Exhibit, The Ukrainian Museum, New York
- 2017 — "Metagraphical Imressions" – O. Golub and W. Kharchenko, "Mykola House" gallery, Kyiv
- 2015 — 10th International exhibition of digital art, Ottawa, Canada
- 2015 — "True testimony: from the Revolution of Dignity to the present" National History Museum of Ukraine, Kyiv
- 2015 — Digital Agora – 1 International Digital Art Triennial, Szekszard, Hungary
- 2015 — Revolution of Dignity art Exhibit: Images from Ukraine's Maidan, 2013–2014, Wilson Center Washington, D.C., U.S.
- 2014 — 9th International Digital Art Miniprint Exhibition, Ottawa, Canada
- 2014 — "Invasion" – personal photo installation project, "Maysternia" gallery, House of Artists, Kyiv
- 2013 — International print triennial Krakow-Falun, Dalarnas Museum, Falun, Sweden, catalog p. 150
- 2013 — "In.print.out" – International Print Trienale, catalog p. 83
- 2012 — "Matrices 2012" – International exhibitions of small electrographic artworks, Budapest, Hungary, catalog Pp. 51
- 2011 – 10 years the Kyiv's Modern Art Research Institute (directed by Victor Sydorenko)
- 2011 – "Impossible community", Contemporary Art Museum, Moscow, curator V. Miziano, Yevgeniy Fiks project "Portrait of the 19 million", photo installation
- 2010 — Auction "Ukrainian alternative", catalog p. 51
- 2010 — "Matrices 2010" – Biennial elektrohrafiky, Budapest, Hungary, the catalog Pp. 23, 53.
- 2010, 2005 — exhibition "Special themes circuit", Linz, Austria
- 2009 — Kyiv National Museum of Literature, photo installations, dedicated to Taras Shevchenko and Lesia Ukrainka
- 2008 — "DIGITAL YARD № 3" – participant and co-curator of art group "G. V. Kh.", WG Kunst Gallery, Amsterdam, the Netherlands, 2008, catalog p. 1–9
- 2008, 2007 — "Gogolfest" – International Art Festival, Art Arsenal, Kyiv – art works, dedicated to Nikolai Gogol
- 2007 — "GIAF 2007" – Hayonhnam International Art Festival in Masan, Korea, prints, catalog st.112
- 2006-2005 — "In the space Dubuffet" – exhibition joint with Nicoletta Montalbetti, photo collages. French Institute in Ukraine (Kyiv, Odesa, Dnipropetrovsk, Donetsk).
- 2005 — "Birdinvest project", curator and member of the Ukrainian part of the International Project Borhlun, Belgium, catalog p. 42
- 2005 — "Peace and War," Gallery of Kyiv-Mohyla Academy, the International Photobienalle "Second Month of Photography in Kyiv", catalogue p. 95–96.
- 2005, 1985.1983 — International Biennial of humor and satire in the arts, Gabrovo, Bulgaria, catalog 2005, p. 125
- 2004 — "Yellow Hare's Triumph", personal exhibition, "University" gallery, painting, graphics, photos, Kyiv
- 2003 — International Print Trienale "Eurografik", curator Witold Skulicz, Kraków, Poland, catalogue p. 50
- 2003, 2001, 2000 — I, II and III International Art Festival, Magdeburg, Germany, catalogs: I – "People and animals", P. 29, II – "Beyond everyday", Pp. 46, 130; III — "Signals of inexact time", S.123

== Theoretical research ==
As an art critic, Golub explores several directions.

- Alternative art in a broad sense, and in particular underground culture
- Art works created on the basis of new, digital, technologies
- The essence of the creative process in the modern world
- Art market lows and freedom of the artist
- Interaction of Ukrainian and Western art
