= Oleg Kharch =

Ukrainian visual and sound artist

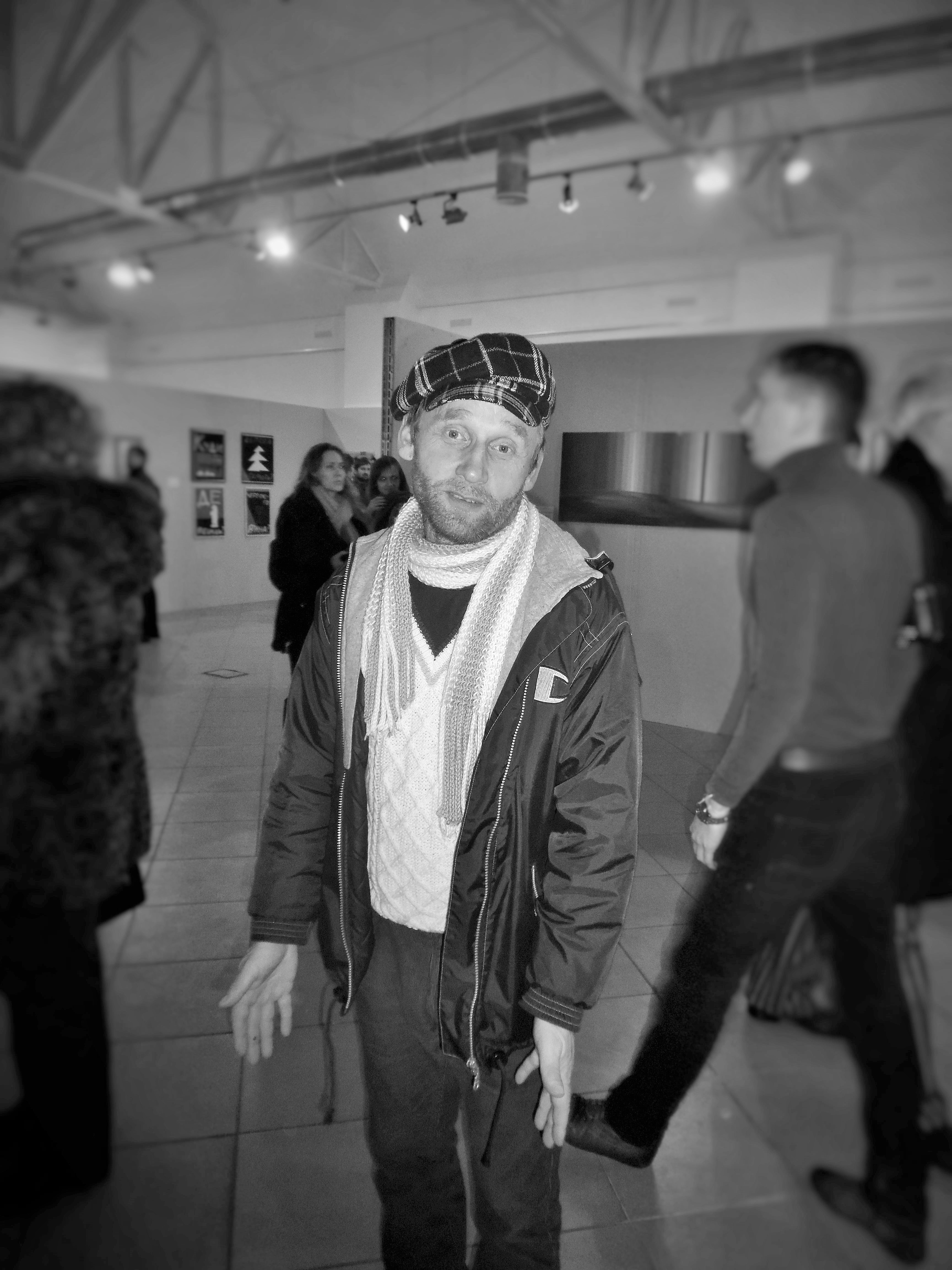

Oleg Kharch /Kharchenko (Ukrainian: Харченко (Харч) Олег Володимирович; born June 8, 1963, in Sumy) — is a Ukrainian visual and sound artist working in the figurative, new Ukrainian naive (Quasi- naive), post-conceptual direction.

His works ranges from street art projects, sound sculptures and video collage to traditional painting.Founder and member of the Open O’pen$ group of artists since 2020. Together with his wife (Olga Shuvalova), Oleg Kharch Group was established in 2016.

== Education and personal life ==
From 1980 to 1985 he was a student of the Faculty of Building Technology in Dnipro (ex-Dnepropetrovsk) Construction Engineering Institute, and during 1981–83 he attended the art studio of Stanislav Cherevko, Dnepropetrovsk.

1981 -83 studied in art studio of Stanislav Cherevko/ Dnipro (ex-Dnepropetrovsk)/ USSR. 1985 -87 junior sergeant, squad leader of armored vehicles Repair in the Soviet Army. Since December 2018 he has been a participant of "Hlebzawod".

Kharch is a resident of Kyiv, Ukraine.

== Publications ==
- 2015 Ukraine: Short Stories about Contemporary Artists from Ukraine, Luciano Benetton, Italy
- 2019- "Tries to Bring Ukraijne CLoser to the West". [

== Selected exhibitions ==
- 2025 —Torrance Art Museum, TRYST International Art Fair, in the project "Wartime-Lifetime" by the Open O’pen$ group (Oleg Kharch, Olena Golub, Andriy Budnyk, Glib Viches, Volodymyr Kharchenko, Rene van Kempen).
- 2023 —Ukrainian Biennale of Digital and Media Art 2023: Awakenings| Kyiv, Ukraine;
- 2023 —Oleg Kharch: Evacuation a small excerpt from the gigantic warin spaceCAESUUR.Wij zijn De Stad Middelburg, the Netherlands
- 2023 —Man & Woman: Robbing Europe| Estonian National Museum, Tartu, Estonia;
- 2023 —Snails Don’t Live Forever| OKNa. Porto, Portugal; (solo)
- 2023 —Tryst Alternative Art Fair 2023| TRYST Alternative Art Fair, Torrance Art Museum, Torrance, CA, United States;
- 2022- XXII Bienal Internacional de Arte de Cerveira| Vila Nova de Cerveira, Portugal;
- Ukraine: Short Stories Contemporary artists from Ukraine|MAXXI - Museo nazionale delle arti del XXI secolo, Rome

Italy; 22 Ukraine: Short Stories Contemporary artists from Ukraine

- 2021 -First Ukrainian Biennale of Digital and Media Art "30 Years of Freedom". Valery Korshunov (Ukraine), Yuri Lech Polanski(Spain), curators. Artarea Gallery, Kyiv, Ukraine;

-" Wellcome Elon Musk!"| Kmytiv Museum of Fine Arts named Y. D. Bukhanchuk/ Kmytiv, Zhytomyr region, Ukraine; Curator- Solomia Savchuk.

- 2020: Corona! Shut down!| international festival network @ New on NewMediaFest2020!, (Germany), curator – Wilfried Agricola de Cologne
- "Cam Pandemic Art"| CAM_Casoria Contemporary Art Museum/ Naples, Italy, curator-Antonio Manfredi
- "The Environment of Existence. Manifest 2020"| Kyiv City Art Gallery Lavra / Kyiv, Ukraine, curator - Yulia Nuzhina
- 2019: Wake up! – Climate change!| international festival network @ The New Museum of Networked Art, Cologne (Germany), curator – Wilfried Agricola de Cologne
- 2019: Media Art Exhibition: Artefact: Chernobyl33/ River station/Kyiv, Ukraine
- 2019: Kyiv Art Week 2019| Art Fair "Hlebsawod"|23-26 May "Toronto - Kyiv" Complex
- 2019: The book of the artist. "Chronicles of the unpublished (hybrid) war. Or [Cotton Accounting], from Oleg Kharch"| Contemporary art center "Hlebzawod"/ Kyiv, Ukraine
- 2018: "Hlebzawod Art Prize 2018"| Contemporary art center "Hlebzawod"/ Kyiv, Ukraine
- Participate in "Creative Climate Awards 2018" ("CCAs2018"), of the Human Impacts Institute's at the Taipei Economic and Cultural Office in New York, USA
- 2017: Participate in Art- Projekt– "Auto / Macht / Mobilität" /"Kunstpreis Worpswede", Einbeck, Germany
- "Gogolfest 2017 Oleg Kharch"/ Visual Art Programm Gogolfest, Visual art, Kiyv, Ukraine
- 2017 5th Odesa Biennial "Turbulence Area"/ Odesa
- 2017 Semi- project Oleg Kharch& Volodymir Kharchenko/ "khARTchenko- No CONJUNCTURE promenade"
- 2016 Project of Contemporary Art "Event Horizon", curators- A. Soloviev, A. Lozhkina, S. Savchuk, Mysteckyi Arsenal, Kiyv
- 2016 Parallelismes/ The (Instead Undo VIII Tashkent Biennale of Contemporary Art "Pushing the boundaries, unite the world") / Uzbekistan
- 2016 Mashrou' Proletkult/ AUB Art Galleries/ Beirut, Lebanon.
- 2016 Freierfest / Odesa, Ukraine
- 2016 Goodбaй Хутiр Postмодерн / KZ Art Room/ Kyiv, Ukraine
- 2015 Manifesto / IV Biennale Contemporary/ Odesa, Ukraine
- 2014 Snailices or snails attack / Art Kyiv Contemporary IX/ MyGallery / Kyiv, Ukraine.
- 2014 Ukrainian Pictorial Exhibition / The Museum of Arts of Cherkasy region, Ukraine.
- 2014 International Art Projects "fame not fallen heroes" & "Fame Maydan Heroes", V.Akhunov (Uzbekistan) & O.Kharch (Ukraine)/ Grushevskiy str. Second Barricade/ Maydan Nezalezhnosti/ Hreshchatyk str. by KSGA, Kyiv, Ukraine.
- 2013 Such earnings / Mala Gallery of Mystetsky Arsenal art center/ Kyiv, Ukraine.
- 1991 Exhibition Folk-Applied Art of Poltava region, The Poltava Museum of Local Lore, Ukraine;
- 1989 Exhibition of Bergen in Kingdom Norway;
- 1988 Exhibition, Museum of Local Lore Murmansk ex-USSR;

Art residencies:

- 2019- Media Art Residence Carbon/"Artefact: Chernobyl 33"/Kyiv, Ukraine;
- 2015/2013 Private artistic residency in Cap-d'Ail, Provence-Alpes-Côte d'Azur, France;

== Collections ==
- Mystetskyi Arsenal National Art and Culture Museum Complex, Kyiv, Ukraine
- Digital collection of the Princeton University Library, USA
- Manuscript collection of the Princeton University Library, USA
- Human Impacts Institute in New York, USA
- Luciano Benetton Collection, Italy
- Lysenko MyGallery Kyiv/Ukraine | London/UK
- Private collections
