= Leonid Vysheslavskyi =

Ukrainian poet

- Born: 18 March 1914; Mykolaiv Russian Empire
- Died: 26 December 2002 (aged 88); Kyiv, Ukraine
- Citizenship: USSR, Ukraine
- Occupations: Poet, literary critic, translator
- Writing career
- Language: Ukrainian, Russian
- Notable awards: Taras Shevchenko Prize, 1984
- Website: www.leonid.vysheslavsky.name

Leonid Vysheslavskyi (Ukrainian: Леонід Миколайович Вишеславський; 18 March 1914 – 26 December 2002) was a Ukrainian poet, literary critic and translator. He wrote in the Russian and Ukrainian languages and published more than 60 books of poems, prose and translations. Vysheslavskyi's works were published in the Ukrainian, Polish, German, French and other languages. He had supporters and friends in many countries.

== Biography and creation ==
Leonid Vysheslavskyi was born in Nikolayev 18 March 1914. His father Mykola Vysheslavskyi (1888–1979) was engineer, his mother Cleopatra Platonova (1892–1939) was the daughter of a priest. He spent his childhood in the family's maternal grandfather, a priest Harlampy Platonov, in a family with great cultural and spiritual traditions. His wife Agnessa Baltaga (1905–1991) was literary critic. Their daughter — Iryna Vysheslavska — is artist, their grandson — Hlib Vysheslavskyi — is artist and art critic.

In his youth he was interested in futurist poets, especially Vladimir Mayakovsky, (many years later, he wrote about him literary studies). First poems he published in 1931 in Kharkiv and in Moscow. He graduated from Taras Shevchenko University of Kyiv in 1938, philological department. Since 1948 until 2002 Vysheslavskyi was the editor of the magazine Raduga (means: rainbow), (renamed in 1963 from "Soviet Ukraine").

One of the main themes in the Vysheslavskyi's poetry is a flight into space, as a human contact with the Universe. After Yuri Gagarin’s flight Vysheslavsky wrote several poetry books. The First Astronaut liked his poems very much and ever wrote himself introduction to one of them. Vysheslavsky had active creative life and communication with prominent contemporaries: priest Alexander Men, poets David Burliuk, Boris Pasternak, Mykola Zerov, Pavlo Tychyna, Ivan Drach and other.

== Awards ==
- Winner of Literary Prize by Pavlo Tychyna (1974);
- Winner of National Prize of Ukraine by Taras Shevchenko (1984);
- Asteroid 2953 "Visheslaviya" was named in honor of the poet (1986).

== Sources ==
- (in Russian) L. Vysheslavskyi. Selected works in two volumes. Kyiv: Dnipro, 1984
- (in Russian) L. Vysheslavskyi. By heart. Memories. Moscow: Soviet writer, 1989
- (in Russian) L. Vysheslavskyi. Poet planet «Vysheslavia». K. KMP "Poetry." 1994
- (in Russian) L. Vysheslavskyi. Bells through the leaves. Poems. Moscow: Pravda. 1989
- (in Ukrainian) L. Visheslavskyi. Skovorodinіv's circle. Poems. Kyiv: Smoloskyp. 1997
- (in Russian) L. Vysheslavskyi lyrics . Kyiv. OOO «Reef». 1999
- (in Ukrainian) L. Vysheslavskyi. Ukrainian confession: Poems. Prose. Kyiv: Publisher by Olena Teliha. 2004
