= Faris McReynolds =

American painter and musician

Faris McReynolds (born 1977, Dallas, Texas) is a Los Angeles-based artist and musician. His paintings have been shown in solo exhibitions around the world and have been featured in Details, Art Papers, Flash Art Magazine, Tema Celeste, and ArtWeek.

McReynolds grew up in Richardson, Texas, a suburb of Dallas, the son of an Indian mother and an American father. He spent his childhood between Texas and Mumbai, and appeared in the 1985 Bollywood movie Shahadat, when he was eight. From 1990–1998, he played bass guitar in Dallas based skate-punk band Family Values. During that time, they toured the American southwest. He started publicly showing his paintings in 1998, and in 2000, he received his BFA from Otis College of Art and Design in Los Angeles.

== Selected solo exhibitions ==
- 2013 Six New Paintings, Shaheen Modern and Contemporary, Cleveland, US
- 2011 Oil Studies 2006-2010, Shaheen Modern and Contemporary, Cleveland, US
- 2010 Toxic Mimics, Tim Van Laere Gallery, Antwerp, Belgium
- 2010 California/West Coast USA: Faris McReynolds, Cultuurcentrum Kortrijk, Kortrijk, Belgium
- 2009 The Primitive Electric, Roberts Projects, Culver City, US
- 2008 Plastic Palace, Goff + Rosenthal, Chelsea, US
- 2008 Dreamland, Gallery Min Min, Tokyo, Japan
- 2008 Ironic Heroics, Goff + Rosenthal, Chelsea, US
- 2007 Sight Unseen, Shaheen Modern and Contemporary, Cleveland, US
- 2007 The Beautiful Mob, Tim Van Laere Gallery, Antwerp, Belgium
- 2007 Gallery Min Min, Tokyo, Japan
- 2007 Plastic Palace, Goff + Rosenthal, Berlin, Germany
- 2006 Oh, Dead Air Roberts & Tilton, Los Angeles, US
- 2006 Gallery Min Min, Tokyo, Japan
- 2006 Perugi Arte Contemporea, Padova, Italy
- 2005 Gallery Min Min, Tokyo, Japan
- 2004 It’s a Rainy Day, Sunshine Girl Roberts & Tilton, Los Angeles, US
- 2004 Gallery Min Min, Tokyo, Japan
- 2003 There is no There There, Perugi Arte Contemporea, Padova, Italy
- 2003 Modern Blues, Marvelli Gallery, New York, US
- 2002 Whispering Bad News, Roberts & Tilton, Los Angeles, US
- 2001 The Promise of Maybe, Practice Space, Los Angeles, US

== Selected group exhibitions ==
- 2020 Human is a Five Letter Word, Galerie Droste, Wuppertal, Germany
- 2019 Dreamhouse Vs. Punk House (plus Cat house), Serious Topics, Inglewood, US
- 2015 An Odyssey: 10 Years of the Torrance Art Museum, Torrance Art Museum, Torrance, US
- 2015 Contemporary Constructions with emphasis on the German impact on Contemporary Art, California Center for the Arts Escondido, Main Gallery Exhibition, Escondido, US
- 2015 Presence: Selections from the Matthew and Iris Strauss Family Foundation Collection, SDSU Downtown Gallery, San Diego, US
- 2015 Three Day Weekend: Party in Back, Blum & Poe, Los Angeles, US
- 2015 Up to & Including the Horizon, Ochi Projects, Los Angeles, US
- 2014 Game Changer 2: Contemporary Painting and Sculpture from the Matthew & Iris Strauss Family Foundation, University of San Diego (USD), Exhibit Hall – Student Life Pavilion
- 2013 Interiors: Faris McReynolds & Claudia Parducci, Nye + Brown, Los Angeles, US
- 2009 Summer Exhibition, Goff + Rosenthal, New York, US
- 2009 Miami Basel Art Fair, Exhibited Miami Basel Art Fair December 2009, Miami, US
- 2008 Drawings and Other Works On Paper, Tim Van Laere Gallery, Antwerp, Belgium
- 2008 Macrocosm, Roberts & Tilton, Culver City, US
- 2008 Silent Films & Bedroom Paintings, curated by Adam Lerner, The Lab at Belmar, Colorado, US
- 2007 Some Kind of Portrait, Marc Selwyn Fine Art, Los Angeles, US
- 2007 Torrance Art Museum, Main Gallery, curator Kristina Newhouse, Torrance, US
- 2006 Do Not Stack, Roberts & Tilton, Los Angeles, US
- 2006 Inaugural Exhibition, Goff + Rosenthal, Berlin, Germany
- 2006 Sea Change Roberts & Tilton, Los Angeles, US
- 2006 Dig for Fire Tim Van Laere Gallery, Antwerp, Belgium
- 2005 Untitled Roberts & Tilton, Los Angeles, US
- 2005 Syzygy, Shaheen Modern and Contemporary, Cleveland, US
- 2005 The Earth as Seen from the Moon, Galleria Cesare Manzo Pescara, Italy, curated by Marco Atlavill
- 2005 Pacific Lives, curated by Dean Anes, Richard Yancey Gallery, New York, New York
- 2005 LA Times, curated by Dean Anes, Bernard Toale Gallery, Boston, Massachusetts
- 2004 Eye of the Needle, Roberts & Tilton, Los Angeles, US
- 2002 London is Balling, Bartwells Institute, London, England
- 2002 Necessary Fictions, DeChiara Gallery, New York, US
- 2001 That Championship Season, Blum & Poe, Santa Monica, US
- 2001 Sometimes it's Dark, Practice Space, Los Angeles, US
- 2001 Snow, Practice Space, Los Angeles, US
- 2001 3, 1335 Willow, Los Angeles, US
- 2001 Phoenicia, Shaolin Temple, Los Angeles, US
- 2001 I Like to Watch, Practice Space, US
- 2000 Rose & Croix, Apt C, Burbank, US
- 2000 Random, Miller Durazo, Los Angeles, US
- 1999 The Touch, Action Space, Los Angeles, US

== Selected public collections ==
- Orange County Museum of Art, Costa Mesa, California
- Museum of Contemporary Art, San Diego, California
- Madison Museum of Contemporary Art, Madison, Wisconsin
- Henry Art Gallery, Seattle, Washington
- Courage at Our Core: Art and Action, Progressive Insurance Headquarters, Mayfield, OH

== Selected bibliography ==
- 2020 "See More of Dakota Johnson's Home: Dakota Johnson turns to Pierce & Ward to craft a dreamy refuge from the bustle of L.A.", Architectural Digest
- 2009 Dambrot, Shana Nys. Rock n Roll Issue, THE Magazine
- 2008 Chandler, Mary Voelz. "Art of creative coupling: Lab at Belmar pairs film, painting in perception test."
- 2008 Rocky Mountain News July 3, 2008: Art & Architecture
- 2008 Scantlen, Seth. Face Forward: Portraiture in Contemporary Art. New York: VisualFieldPress, 2008
- 2007 Dambrot, Shana Nys. Entertain Us! A Selection of Paintings by Faris McReynolds.
- 2007 Poels, Anne-Marie. "Faris McReynolds 'The Beautiful Mob'." Art March 29, 2007: 28
- 2007 Farber, Jim. "It Figures." Rave! March 2, 2007: R19-R20
- 2007 Utter, Douglas Max. "Lost and Found In Space." The Cleveland Free Times, Vol. 14, Issue 44, February 21, 2007
- 2007 Wyszpolski, Bondo. "Here, There, Everywhere." Easy Reader January 25, 2007: 37
- 2006 Wood, Eve. "Faris McReynolds." art US July–September 2006: 6
- 2006 Zellen, Jody. "Faris McReynolds: Los Angeles." Art Papers July/August 2006: 62–63
- 2006 Worman, Alex. "Faris McReynolds: Roberts & Tilton." Flash Art Volume XXXIX, Number 248,
- 2006 Mary–June 2006: 24–26
- 2006 Campagnola, Sonia. "Focus Los Angeles: A Survey of Contemporary Los Angeles Art." Flash Art,
- 2006 January–February 2006: 72
- 2005 Kim, Souri. Details May 2005
- 2005 Japan Times, March 2005
- 2004 Dambrot, Shana Nys. Tema Celeste September 2004
- 2002 Wood, Eve. Tema Celeste September–October 2002: 68–69
- 2002 Wood, Eve. Artweek Volume 33, Issue 6 July–August 2002
- 2002 New American Paintings, Juried Exhibition-in-Print Number 43: 124–25

== Music ==
- 1990-1998: Dallas based skate-punk band Family Values
- 2007-2010: LA based band, The ExDetectives
- 2009–Present: Solo project, One Finger Riot

In 2011, he started the record label Post Planetary and released Archer Black's, Forgiveness is a Weapon.

== Album covers ==
- 2019 Young Hunting, True Believers
- 2018 One Finger Riot, Wrecked Hex: 2013–2018
- 2015 One Finger Riot, Come Drag Me Down
- 2014 One Finger Riot, The Sea
- 2013 Young Hunting, Hazel
- 2013 ExDetectives, Farthest Star
- 2012 ExDetectives, The Lawn (single)
- 2012 ExDetectives, Take my Forever (album)
- 2010 Young Hunting, 7"
