= Irina Vysheslavska =

Ukrainian artist

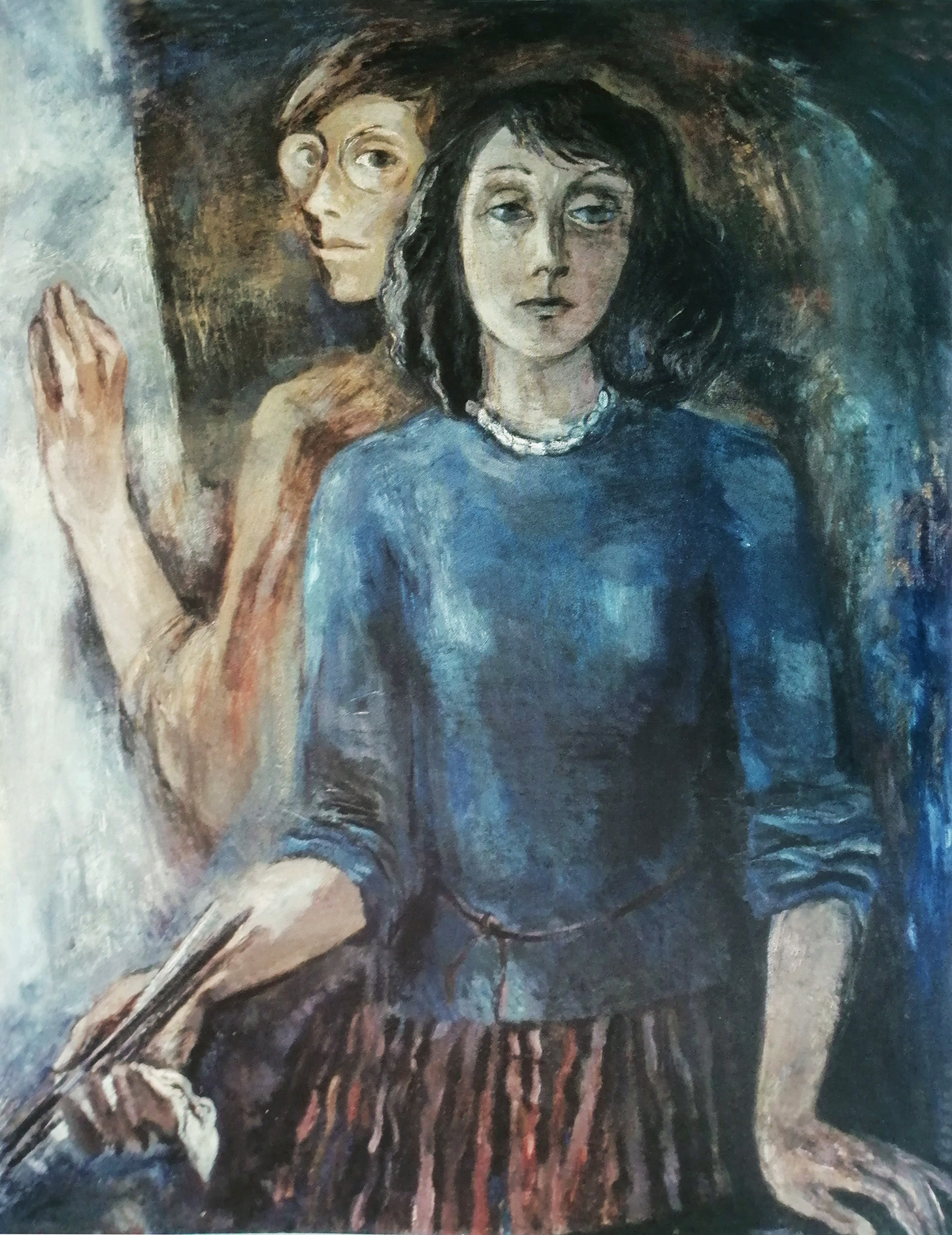
- Irina Vysheslavska. Self-portrait with son. 1981
- Born: February 20, 1939 (age 87); Kyiv, Ukrainian SSR
- Known for: Painting, Illustration

Irina Vysheslavska (born February 20, 1939) is a Ukrainian artist, painter, graphic artist and set designer. She is a member of the National Union of Artists of Ukraine, the International Association "Art of the peoples of the world", the Independent Art Association, "TERRA" in Kyiv and is a member of the "Maison des Artistes" in Paris, France. Her art has been shown in museums in Ukraine, France, Russia, and Azerbaijan among other places.

== Biography ==
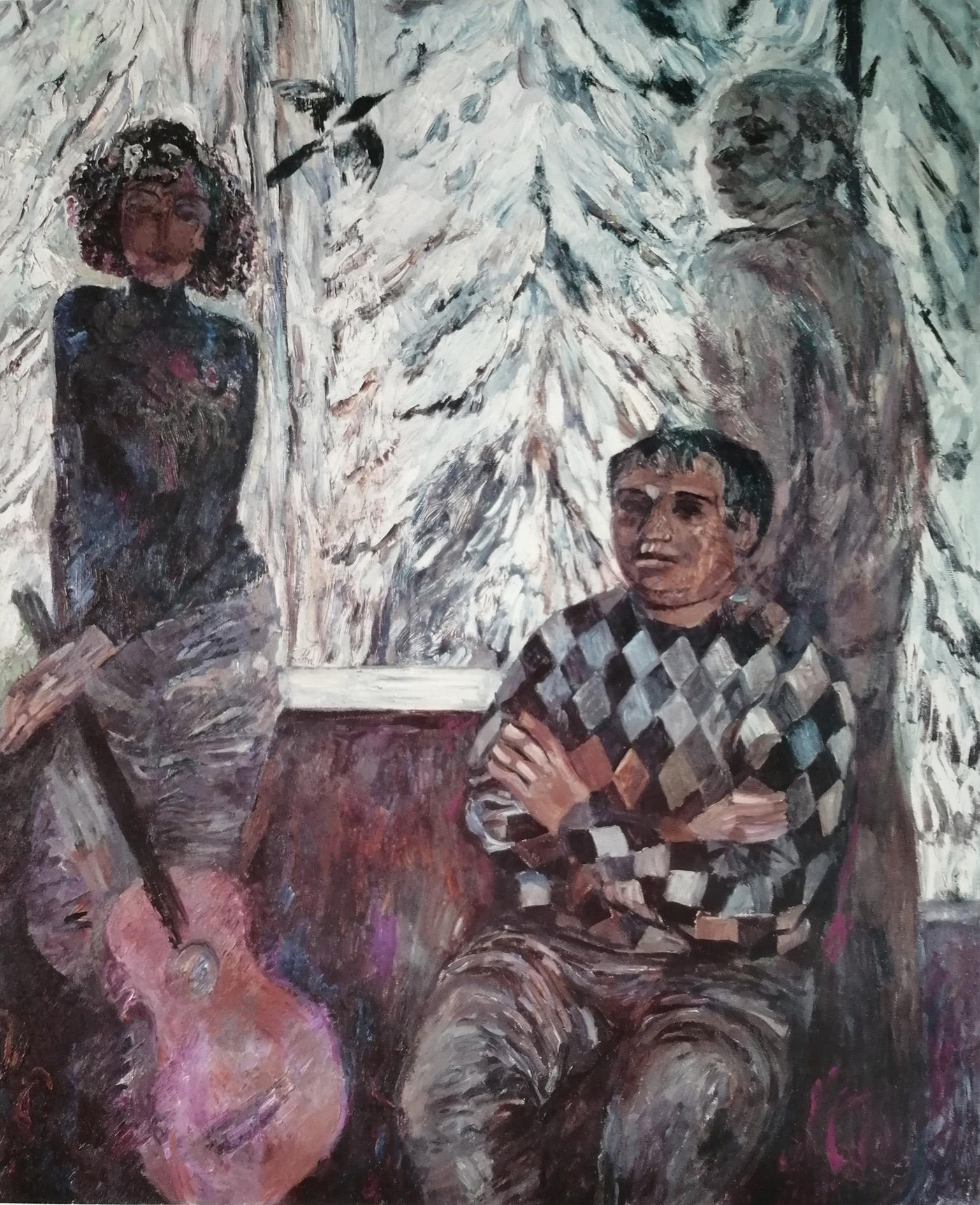
Irina Vysheslavska. Self-portrait with Viktor Pivovarov and Eduard Gorokhovsky. 1975

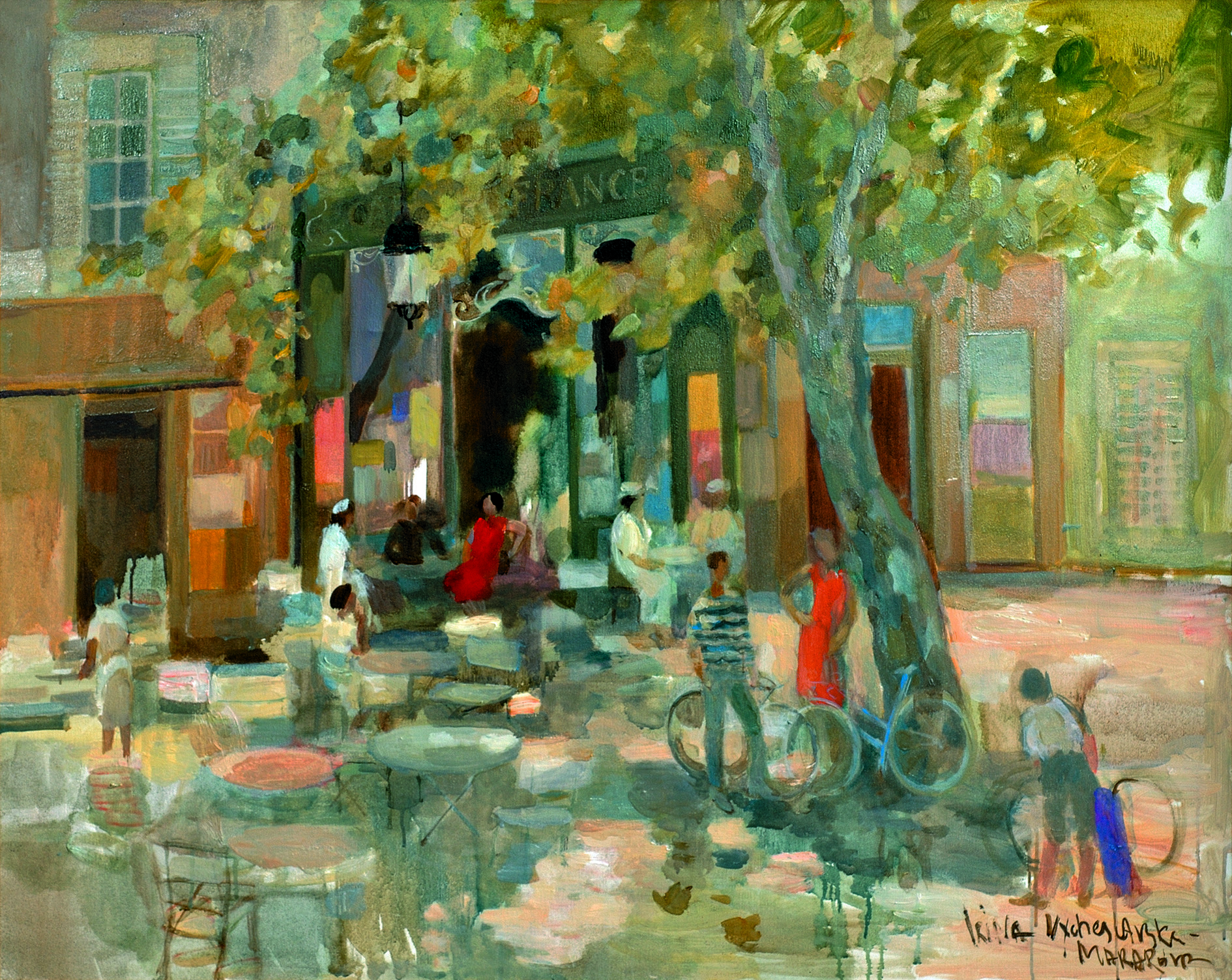
Painting by Iryna Vyshes. Ex-san-Provance.2010

Irina Vysheslavska was born in Kiev on February 20, 1939, into a family of great cultural traditions. Her father Leonid Vysheslavsky was a noted poet and her mother Agnes Baltaga was a writer. Several of her ancestors were priests in Greece, Romania and Ukraine.

Irina showed artistic talent since early childhood. She won the first prize for a watercolor, "Crossing the beach", at the republican exhibition of children's drawings when she was just 8 years old.

Irina Vysheslavska studied in Kiev's State Art School Taras Shevchenko. She studied at the Institute of Painting, Sculpture and Architecture Ilya Repin, Leningrad (St. Petersburg), Russia. Then she moved to Kiev and graduated from Kiev's Art Academy working under her teacher Vassily Zabashta.

During her marriage with writer Anatoly Makarov, Irina signed her works as Makarova-Vysheslavska. Their son Glib Vysheslavsky is an artist and art-critic.

== Creativity ==
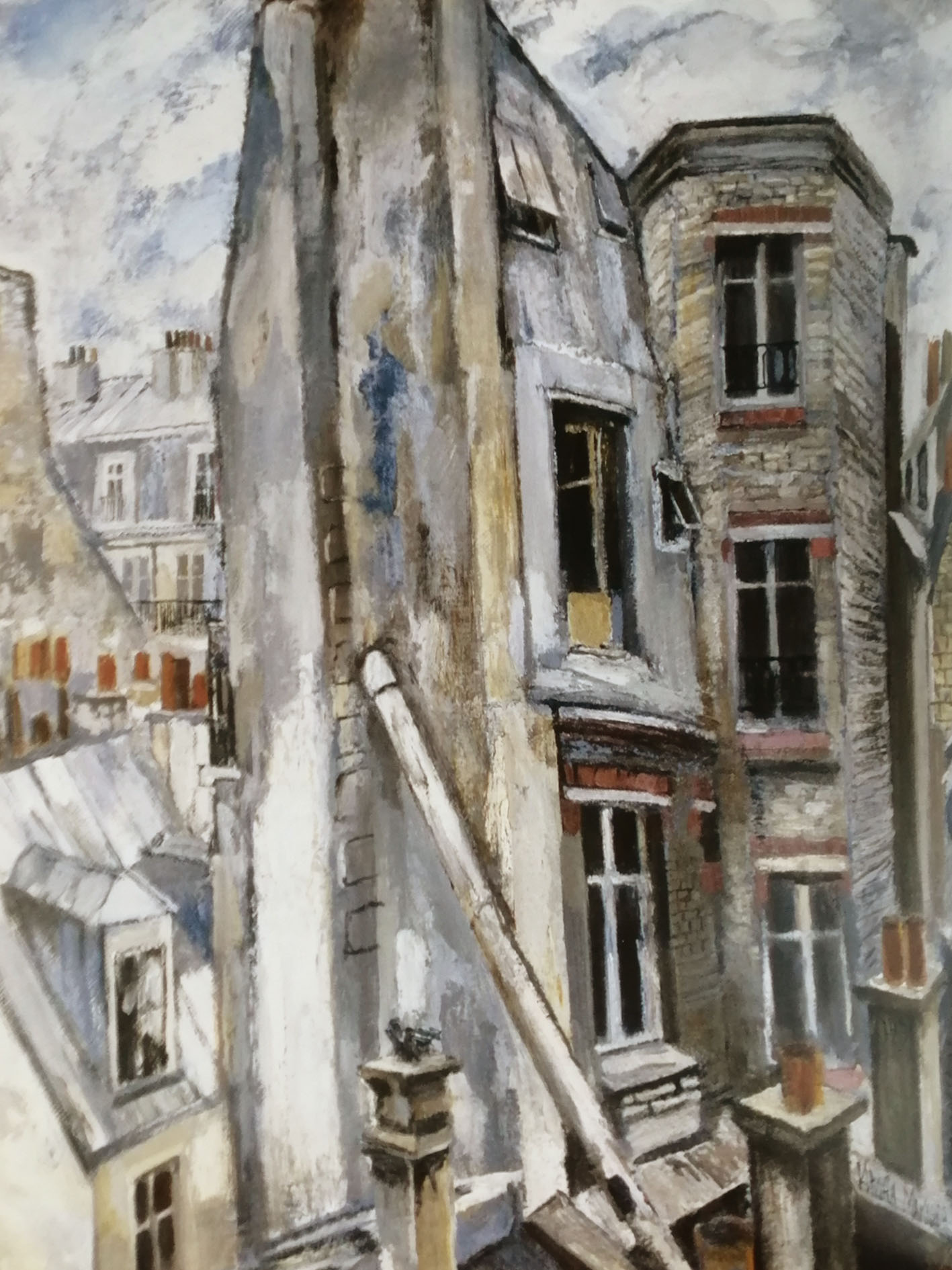
Irina Vysheslavska. Paris Latin Quarter. 1991

Irina's father Leonid Vysheslavsky helped her in her arts education. He organized trips to Europe. This helped his daughter Irina see the best art works in museums in Stockholm, Amsterdam, Paris, Rome and Athens right at the very young age. This type of an experience was virtually unavailable to most people in the USSR those times. An album titled "Impressionism" presented to Irina by her father became the basis for her subsequent independent creativity.

In order to get a good education, Irina went to Leningrad, where she spent much time studying the masterpieces of the Hermitage. She studied for four years in the Leningrad Academy of Arts. Then she was married in Kiev and relocated to the Kiev's Art Institute. During her tenure of eight years with the Art Institute, there were conflicts both with the institute and the Artists' Union. Her style was perceived as too «western». Once she had carried her work to Moscow to National competition of the portrait, which she won. Thus she was accepted into the National Union of Artists of Ukraine in 1975.

A great influence on Irina's views was priest Alexander Men, a critic of the Soviet regime (all of Vysheslavska's family was friendly to him). In Soviet times, Irina chose so-called "quiet resistance" style primarily excluding communist themes such as underground art. After the collapse of USSR, Irina was fascinated by travel in independent Ukraine. She worked for a long time in France.

Irina Vysheslavska is a portrait and genre scenes master, her art depicts psychology and dynamics. She has successfully worked as an illustrator of books and also as a theater set designer.

Iryna Vysheslavska is an art critic, too, she writes about her father.

She is a member of the International Association of "Art of the peoples of the world" (Moscow, Russia) since 1990, the Independent Art Association «Terra» (Kyiv, Ukraine) since 1994 and the «Maison des Artisles» (Paris, France) since 1997.

Her art works are in museums and private collections around the world.

== Sources ==
- in uk.: Irina Vysheslavsky – Makarova / / catalog. – Kyiv: Orans, 2008.
- in fr.: Irina Makarova-Vysheslavska. Album. – Menton, France: "Palais Karnole", 2002
- in fr., in ru.: Natasha Kovalenko. My pictures – this is my life. Monaco, Tandans, 2002, № 12, p. 44
- in fr.: Carol Kur. Portrait of Irina Makarova-Vysheslavsky and Gleb Vyshe-Slavsky. Azur, France, 2002, № 19, p. 24
- in fr.: Zh.Rober Yvonne. Irina Makarova wrote street St. Esprit. "Femina/Nis- Matin", 1999, March, p. V
- in ru.: Irina Makarova-Vysheslavska. Album. Kyiv: Ukrainian Union of Artists, 1992
- in ru.: Dmitry Bisti . The desire for harmony. Moscow: «Pravda», Ogonek, 1988, № 10, p. 8

Interwiki:

- uk:Вишеславська Ірина Леонідівна
- ru:Вышеславская, Ирина Леонидовна
