= Vysheslavskoye =

Vysheslavskoye Вышеславское
- Selo
- Location within Vladimir Oblast Location within Russia
- Coordinates: 56°22′N 40°16′E
- Country: Russia
- Region: Vladimir Oblast
- District: Suzdalsky District
- Time zone: UTC+3:00

Vysheslavskoye (Russian: Вышеславское) is a rural locality (a selo) in Seletskoye Rural Settlement, Suzdalsky District, Vladimir Oblast, Russia. The population was 14 as of 2010. There are 5 streets.

== Geography ==
Vysheslavskoye is located 16 km southwest of Suzdal (the district's administrative centre) by road. Semyonovskoye-Sovetskoye is the nearest rural locality.

== History ==
There is an Eastern Orthodox church in the locality dating back to 1911. In 1994, a fire caused minor damages to the building.
