= SCCA-Ljubljana =

SCCA, Center for Contemporary Arts - Ljubljana
- Formation: 1993
- Type: Non-profit NGO
- Location: Metelkova, Ljubljana, Slovenia
- Director: Dušan Dovč
- Website: Official site

SCCA, Center for Contemporary Arts - Ljubljana was established in 1993 as a Soros Center for Contemporary Arts and is now an independent non-governmental and non-profit organization based in Ljubljana, Slovenia.

The center aims at providing the public, researchers and students of contemporary art with knowledge, tools and skills necessary for reflected work within the art system, establishing a support system in the cooperation with numerous organisations: SKUC Gallery, Kapelica Gallery, Alkatraz Gallery, The Peace Institute, GAMA (Gateway to Archives of Media Art), AICA Armenia to mention just a few. The center forms a support system for contemporary arts, culture and civil society and divides its activities into three separate fields: artistic and archival projects, educational work and support services for artists and cultural workers.

== History ==
Sitabinj a historical place of Keonjhar district, Odisha.

== Projects ==
The "No Nails, No Pedestals" project is a series of artistic and discursive projects that present performances, installations and presentations of artists who present their works by using various media tools on computer screens, television sets and wall projections. The audience is encouraged to reflect on the works and intervene in the discussion and thus add to the interpretational level of artistic practices with their feedback. Studio 6 Project running from 2004 is mostly focused on encouraging discussions and establishing constructive collaboration between diverse protagonists of the contemporary art world (artists, curators, critics, theorists). SCCA is in some part also involved in organizing research projects and exhibitions, but they do not have their own gallery space.

== Video Archive ==
DIVA Station (Digital Video Archive) is a material and web archive of video art designed by SCCA-Ljubljana since 2005, and is the current result of their other projects focused in the research, documentation and archiving of local video / media art materials, including Videodokument, Videospotting, Internet Portfolio, Artservis Collection and e-archive. DIVA Station is also a part of GAMA (Gateway to Archives of Media Art) international internet platform, which brings together eight European video / media archives to make them more visible and easily accessible.

== School ==
The World of Art is an educational program introduced in 1997. It was developed out of a need for theoretical and practical education in the field of contemporary visual art and which (still) no university program in Slovenia offered. Formal education in art history has included neither contemporary production nor the art theory of the 20th and 21st Century and the young experts have mainly turned towards past periods due to their lack of knowledge and apparatuses for decoding contemporary tendencies in art. In the nineties, art production in Slovenia formed an important agent in cultural and social processes and was also integrated into international scene, while the theoretical and curatorial apparatuses lagged behind. In response, the World of Art program brought a series of public lectures, which shed some light upon the artistic practices and art theories significant for the understanding of contemporary arts. A one-year-long course for curators of contemporary art, enabled participants to gain knowledge necessary to perform the work of a contemporary art curator. The program had a significant impact on the local contemporary art scene and a number of participants become curators in state and regional institutions, art centers and galleries, whilst others are working as writers and critics for contemporary art. In recent years the role of curator has shifted towards critical and theoretic reflection of contemporary art, stimulating the program to organize a one-year-long seminar from 2005.

== Non-profit Services ==
Artservis is a web-based information resource for artists, theorists and cultural managers who work in Slovenia and/or internationally. Its basic mission is informing and giving advice. Artservis keeps its users constantly updated with the opportunities in the world of art through offers, tenders, invitations for co-operation, funding possibilities and advice for various tasks in the field of contemporary art.
