= Glib Viches =

French and Ukrainian artist

Hlib Vysheslavskyi
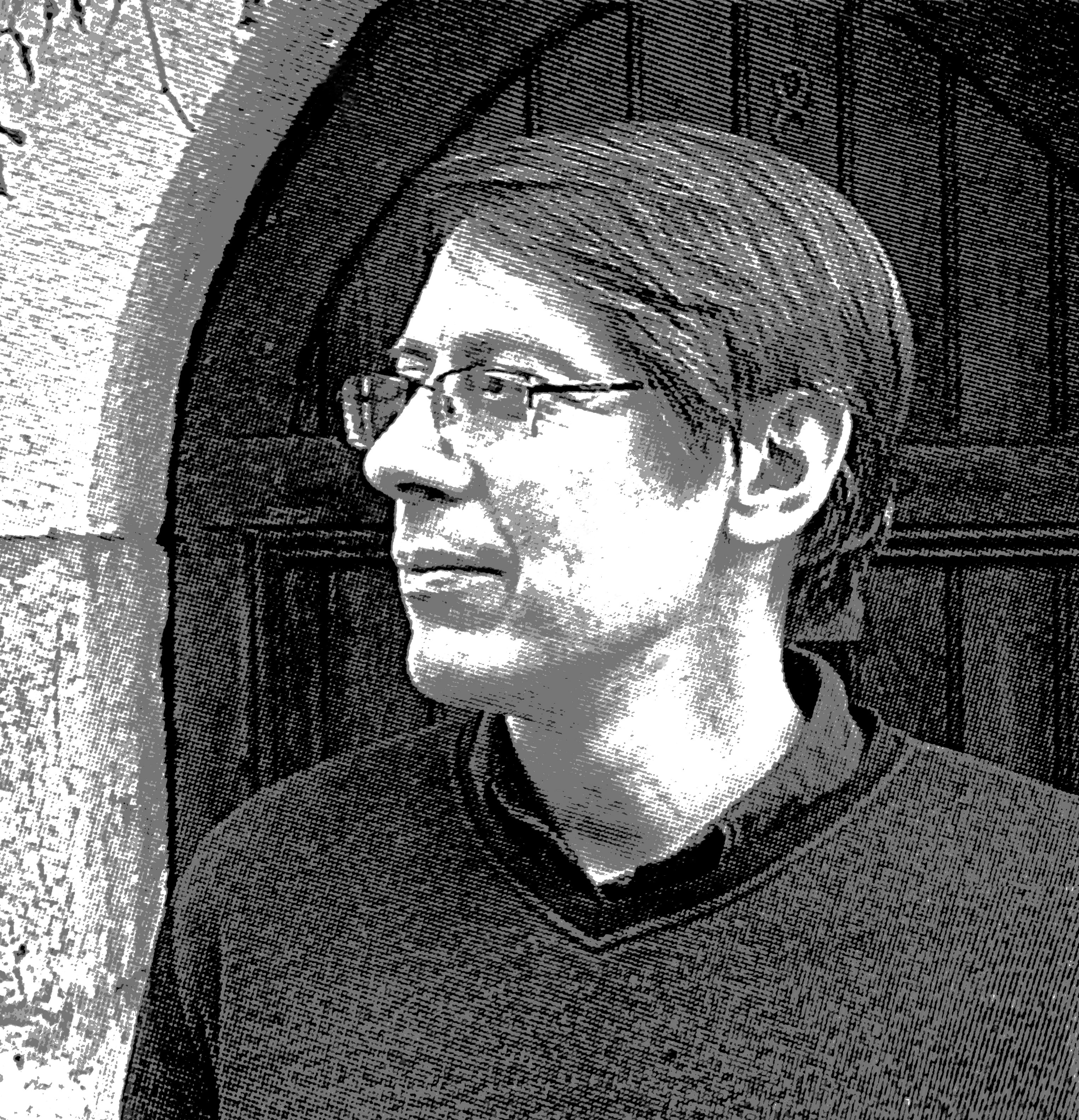
- Born: 6 May 1962 (age 64); Kyiv, Soviet Ukraine
- Other name: Vysheslavskyi
- Education: ENSBA (Paris), National Academy of Visual Arts and Architecture (Kyiv)
- Known for: Terminology of Contemporary Art (book)
- Movement: Contemporary art

Hlib Vysheslavskyi (Ukrainian: Гліб Вишеславський) or Glib Viches (French: Glib Viches) (born 6 May 1962 in Kyiv, Ukraine, USSR) is a Ukrainian artist and art historian. He holds a PhD in art theory and history (2014), and is a member of the International Union of Artists «Sztuka bez Granic» (Kraków) and the National Union of Artists of Ukraine. He is an author of art in painting, graphics, photo, video, installation and scientific research of contemporary art. Representative of Ukrainian New Wave.

Glib's art works are presented at the Menton Pales Carnoles Museum (France), National Art Museum of Ukraine, Sumy Art Museum (Ukraine), in the Sarajevo Museum of Contemporary Art (Croatia) etc.

== Biography and creation ==
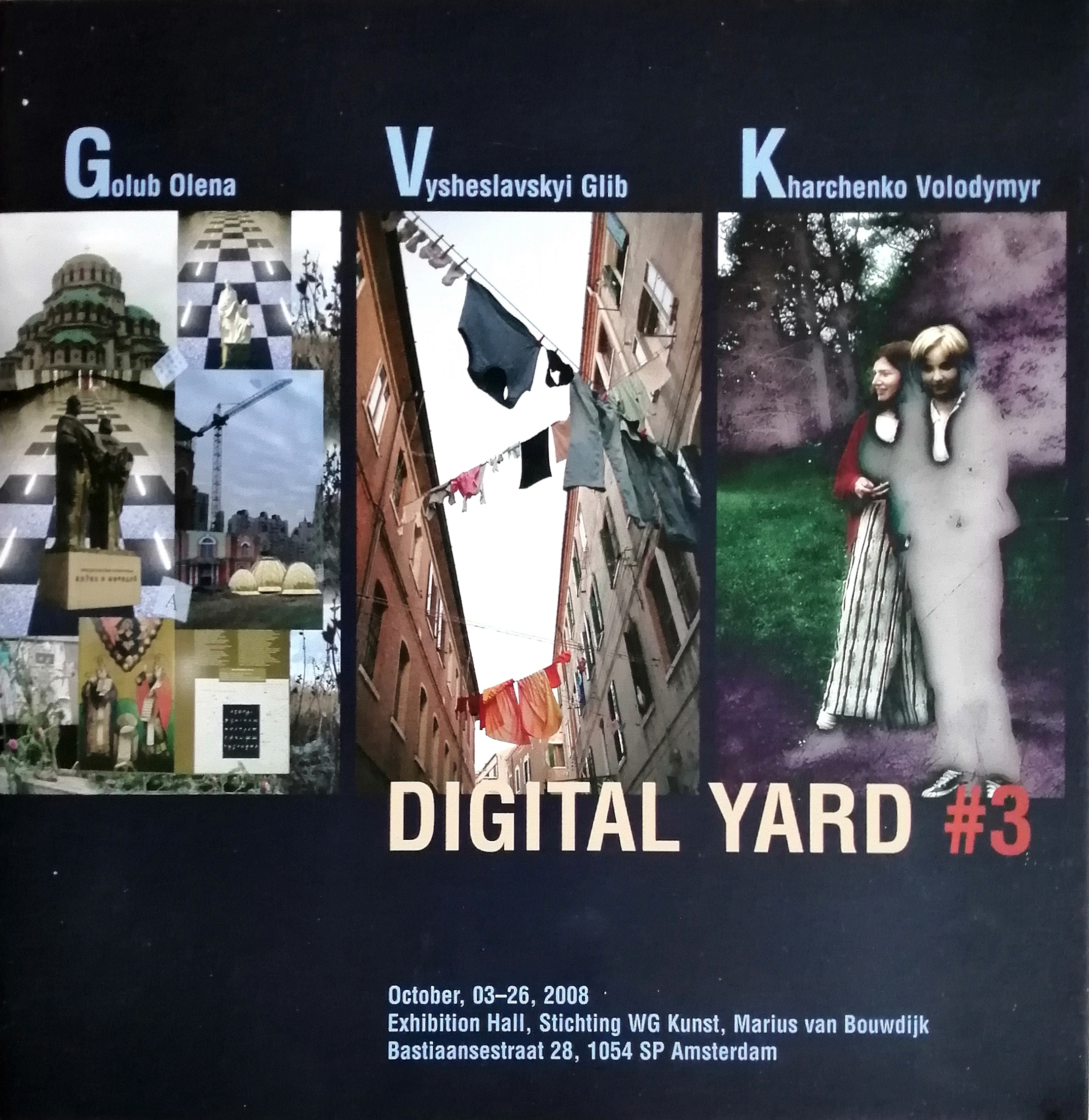
"Digital yard №3". Catalogue, 2008

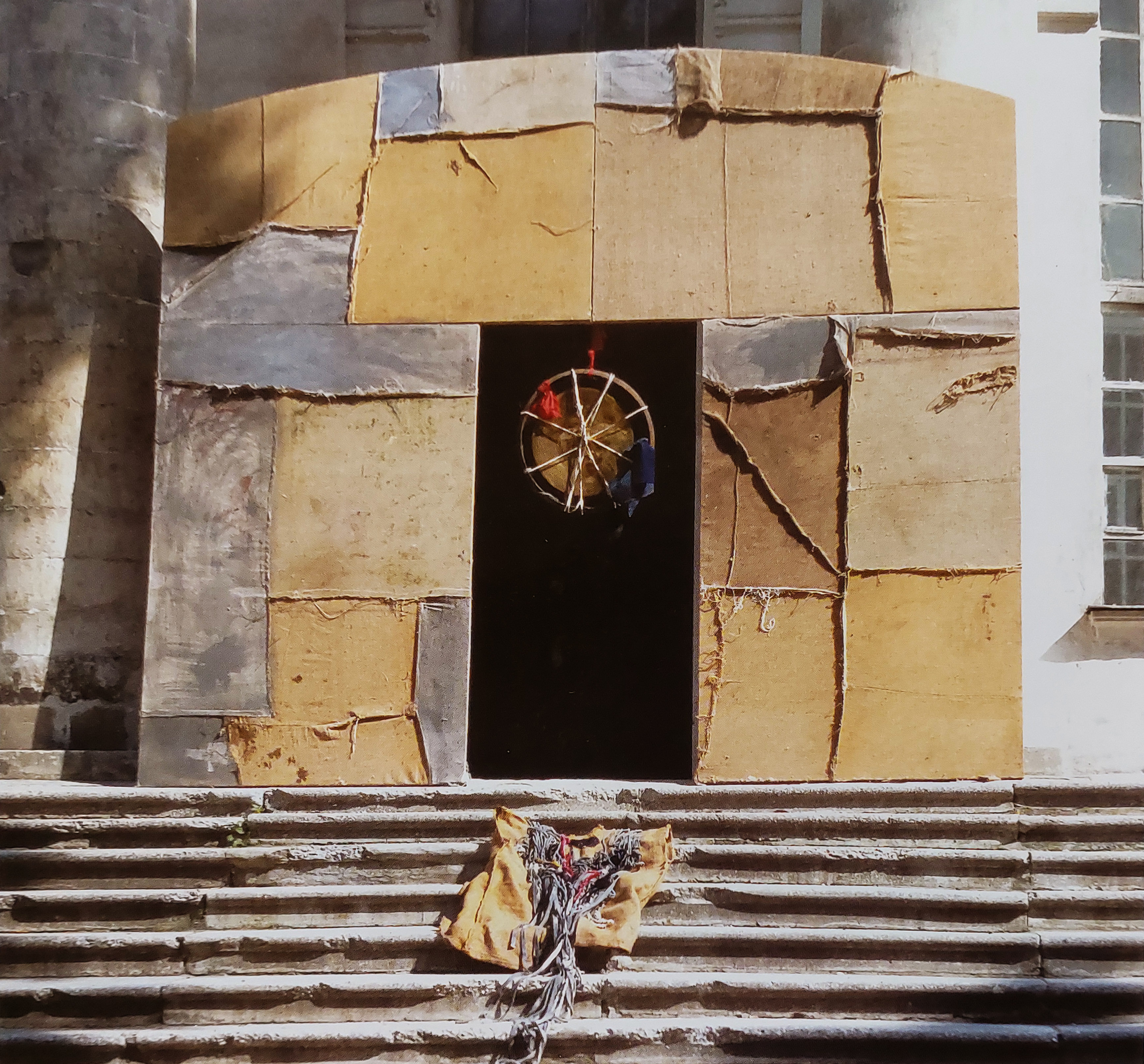
Art object by Hlib Vysheslavskyi. Sun Gates.1989

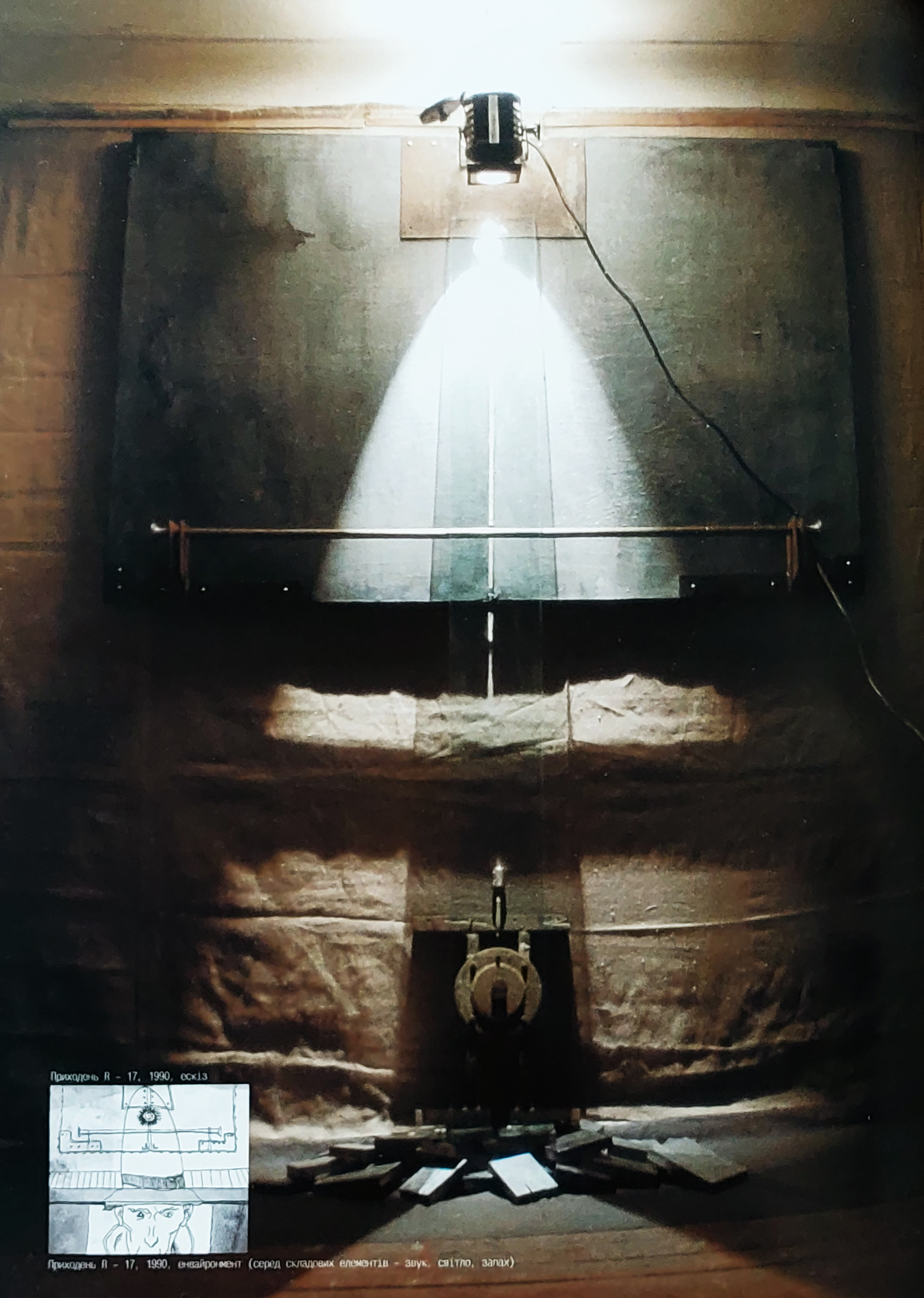
Art object by Hlib Vysheslavskyi R-17. 1990

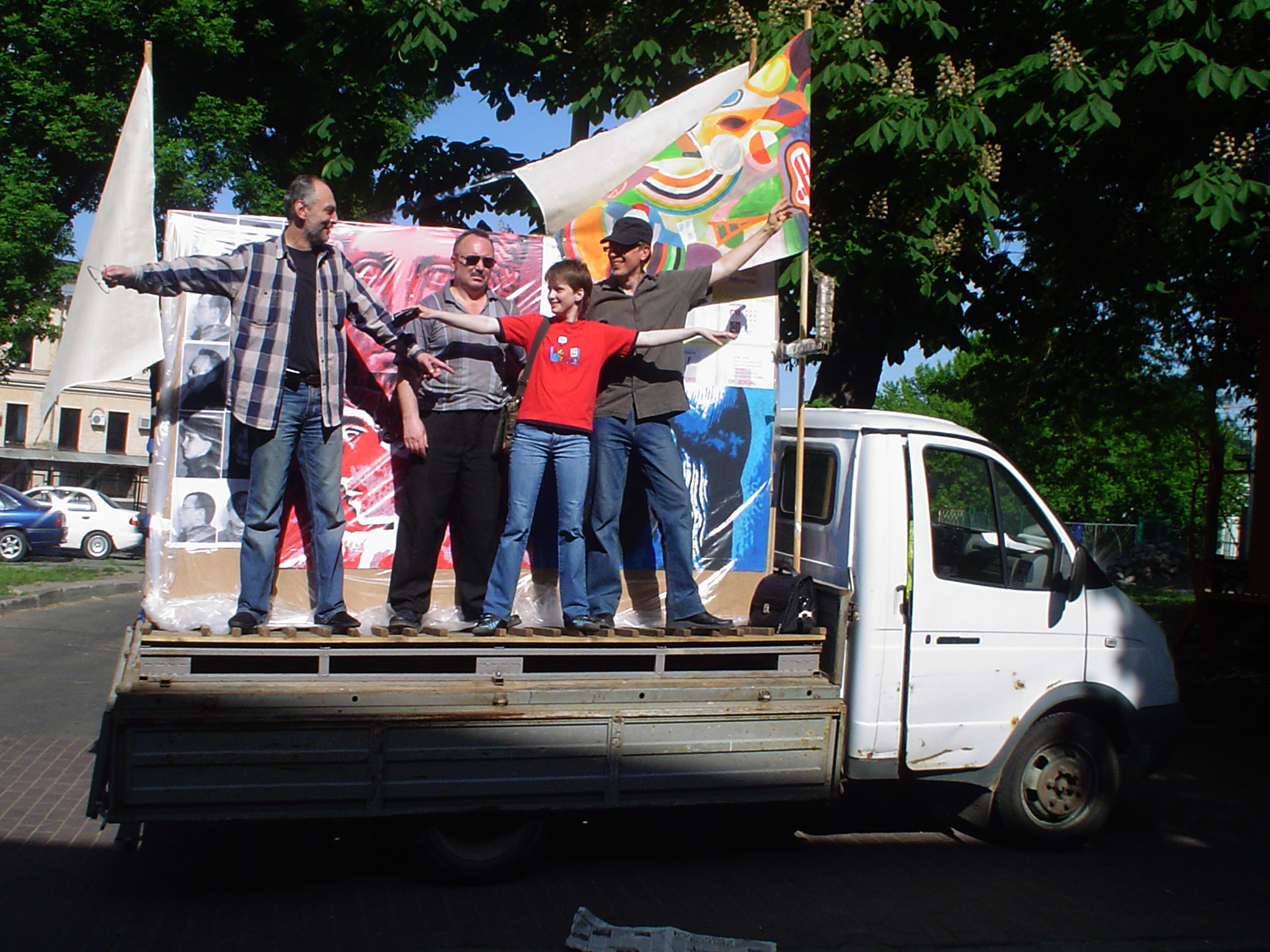
Hlib Vysheslavskyi (Right) in the Contra-Band group. 2007

Hlib Vysheslavskyi was born in Kyiv on 6 May 1962. In 1980, Hlib graduated from the Shevchenko State Art School, Kyiv, Ukraine.

Then he continued studies in «Ecole nationale supérieure des beaux-arts», (Paris) (1989–1993). He was trained in the fund «Villa Arson» (Nice) in 1992. He graduated his training in Kyiv in the National Academy of Visual Arts and Architecture (1993–1997).

During Perestroika Hlib was a member of the Squatting movement, Soviet Nonconformist Art. Later he investigated underground movement and published theoretical articles. He worked as part of the New Wave group in the art of Ukraine "Sednev-88", where A. Babak, M. Geiko, R. Zhuk, P. Kerestey, P. Makov, A. Roitburd, A. Sukholit and others also performed.

In Kyiv he founded the magazine «Terra incognita». It is a private, an independent and non-profit publication about the theory and practice of contemporary visual art (1993–2001). As a video artist he was a member of the 50th Venice Biennale. He took part in the international Biruchiy contemporary art project (2005). A trend accentuated on digital technology in the art he realized in the «G. V. Kh.»- group: Olena Golub, Vysheslavskyi, Kharchenko. Their project «Digital yard № 3» was shown in Amsterdam, the Netherlands (2008).

Vysheslavskyi was Biennale curator «Month of Photography in Kyiv» (2003), co-curator of the exhibition «10 years the Ukrainian Modern Art Research Institute». He also was the chief editor of the «Gallery» magazine (2007–2010). He is the author of monographs and articles publications in specialized magazines, in particular, «Une culture dissimulée» in «La regle du jeu», 2015, No. 57. He is the co-author of the theoretical book «Terminology of Modern Art», where he analyzes the contemporary art diversity and development, based on the examples of more than 400 authors.

Since the second half of the 1990s Hlib Vysheslavkyi has been participating in exhibitions in France. He held exhibitions at the Alexandre Gallery (Paris, 1989), the Michel Cabaret Gallery (Nice, 2002), and the Pales Carnoles Museum of Art (Menton, 2002), in the cathedral – St. Germain des Pres (Paris, 1993) and Paris Nord (Paris, 1993), at D.Art – Nice Expo (Nice, 1996), Salin des peintres mediteranee (Nice, 2003), at the Museum of Art, Toulouse, France (1993). His photos taken over the past few years have been exhibited at the Salon des arts modernes — St.-Sulpice (Paris, 2019), and at the exhibition «Station Paris» in Cloitre, gallery «Caravane», (Paris, 2019).

In 2022 he was a participant and co-curator of the project "Identity. Aspects of modern photography in Ukraine. Apollonia, Strasbourg"

In 2025 he was a participant of the TRYST International Art Fair in Torrance Art Museum, in the project "Wartime-Lifetime" by the Open O’pen$ group (Oleg Kharch, Olena Golub, Andriy Budnyk, Glib Viches, Volodymyr Kharchenko, Rene van Kempen).

== Selected works ==
- in Ukr.: Hlib Vysheslavskyi, Sidor Hibelynda-O. '. // Terminology of Modern Art, Paris-Kyiv, Terra Incognita, 2010, – P.235-242. ISBN 978-966-96839-2-2
- in Fr.: Glib Viches . Une culture dissimulée//La Rеgle du Jeu. Paris, 2015. No. 57. P. 131–139.
- in Ger.: Glib Vysheslavskyj. Vom nonkonformismus zur Oragen Revolution // Springerin, Viennа, 2006. P. 22–32

== Sources ==
- in Fr.:Perottino S. Glib Vysheslavskyi on le Pensee du sensible.// Meditrrancee. – 1992. – No.10.
- in De.: Sergey Kuskov. Triade. lunge Kunst ans Frankreich, Rusland und Deutscland. Ausstellungs-katalog. Leipzig, 1992.
- in Pl.: Sacharuk V. Robit swoje nigzego nie oczekujac. / / Magazyn Sztuki. – 1994. – No. 4. – 160–167 p.
- Perrotino C. Art Impressions. / / Directory. – Kyiv – 1994. – 20–22 seconds.
- in fr., rus.: Burlaka B. Du cote de l'art. // Glib Vyche-Slavskyi. Musee des beaux-arts. Exhibition catalog. Menton, France, 2002 – 1c.
- in fr.: Laffont N. Entre peinture et photo. // Nice-Matin, 27 octobre 2002 – 16p.
- in rus.: Minko E. The two sides of the world . // Domus designe, April 2003 – 33s.
