= Sergey Kuskov =

Russian curator (1957–2008)

Sergey Ivanovich Kuskov
- Born: 6 June 1957; Moscow, (Soviet Union) USSR
- Died: 22 June 2008 (aged 51); Krasnodar, Russia
- Occupation: curator, editor
- Education: Moscow State University
- Relatives: Father: Ivan Kuskov (ru), renowned Russian pictorialist Grandfather: Alexander Chizhevsky, biophysicist

Sergey Ivanovich Kuskov (June 6, 1957 in Moscow, USSR – June 22, 2008 in Krasnodar, Russia) was a renowned Russian curator.

== Biography ==
Kuskov was born on June 6, 1957, in Moscow to Ivan Kuskov (ru) and Irina, daughter of Russian scientist Alexander Chizhevsky. In 1980, he graduated from the Department of History at Moscow State University, with a major in History and Art Theory. In 1989 has defended his Ph.D. in Art Studies. After that he worked in Pushkin Museum of Fine Arts, Moscow and curated a large number of exhibitions. Beyond curating exhibits, he was a well known art critic and authored articles about many artists, including Rasikh Akhmetvaliev, Anatoly Zverev, Dmitry Krasnopevtsev, Lena Hades, Nina Valetova, and Vladimir Yakovlev. He died on June 22, 2008, in Krasnodar.
