= Torrance Art Museum =

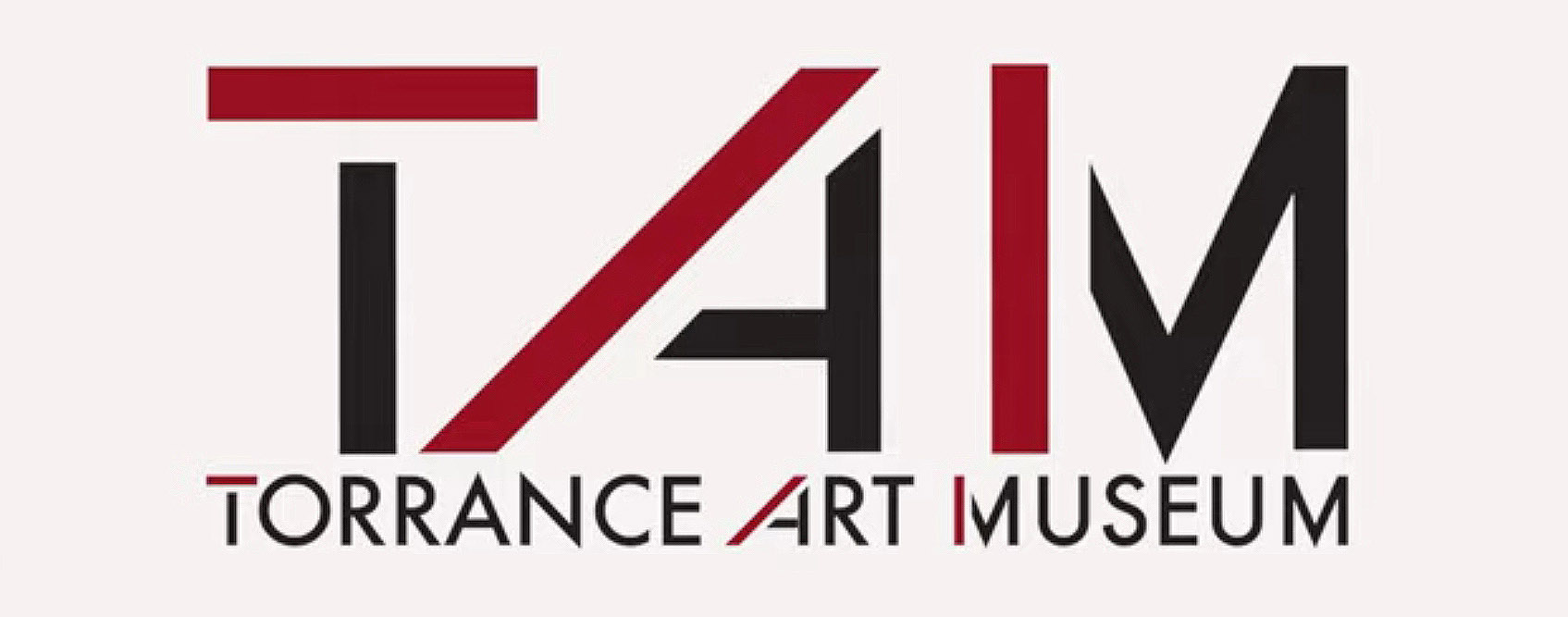

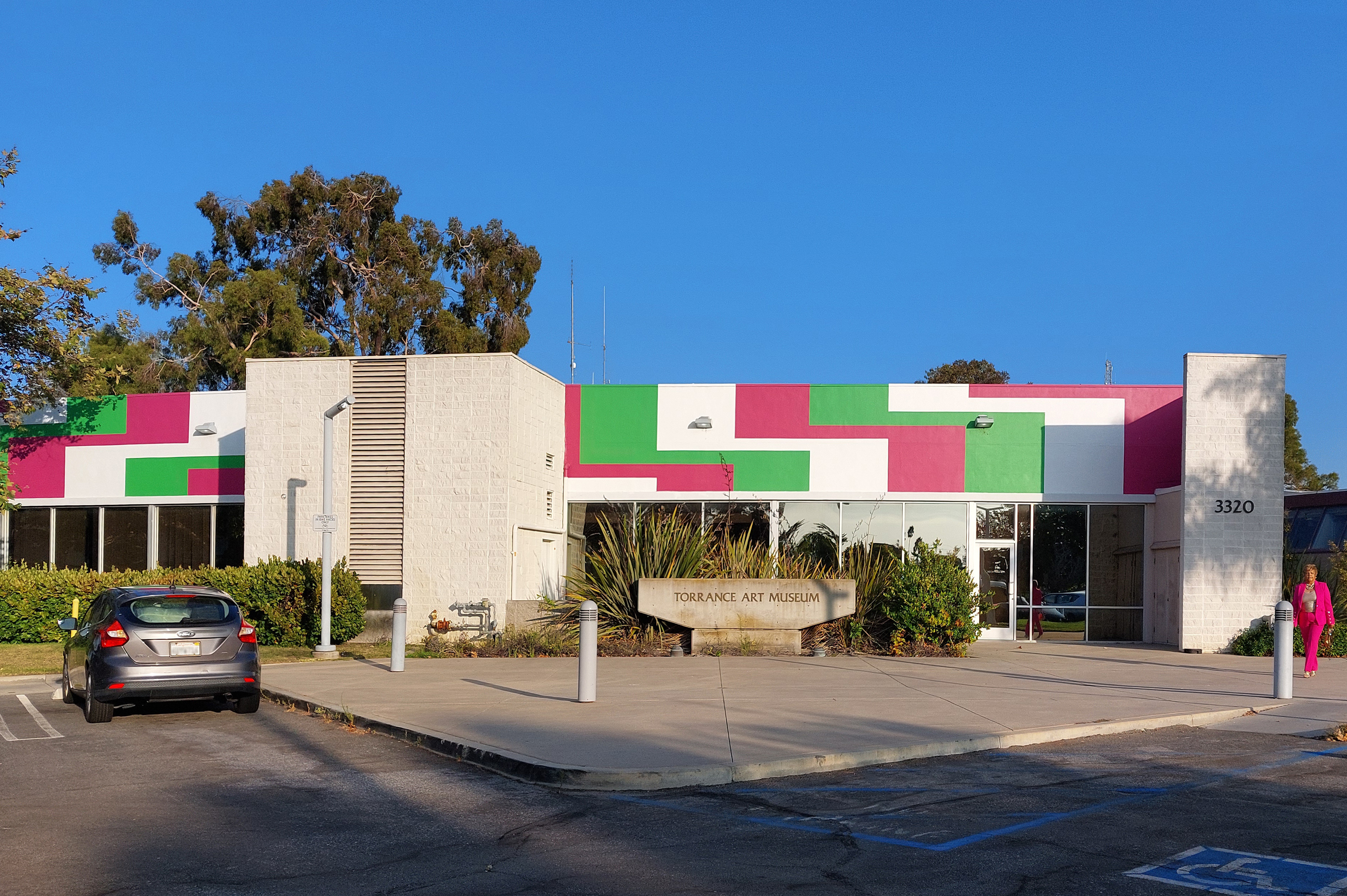
- Exterior in 2024
- Established: 2005
- Location: South Bay Area of Los Angeles, California, 3320 Civic Center Dr, Torrance, California, CA 90503
- Coordinates: 33.8400°N 118.3431°W
- Type: Art Museum
- Collections: Painting, Contemporary art , Conceptual art
- Founder: Erika Grubb
- Directors: Kristine Newhouse (2005-2008), Max Presneill (2009- )
- Architect: Renzo Zecchetto Architects
- Website: www.torranceartmuseum.com

The Torrance Art Museum (TAM) is a museum for contemporary art, located in Torrance, California. It was founded in 2005 after granting museum status to the previous Joslyn Fine Arts Gallery founded in 1964. TAM is a nonprofit organization, exhibits contemporary art, painting, sculpture, photography, media art, performance and conceptual art through temporary rotating exhibitions in its three gallery spaces. The program features on average five shows per year, per gallery space, collects artworks in a digital archive on the website. Since 2009, the museum has been headed by Director and Head Curator, Max Presneill

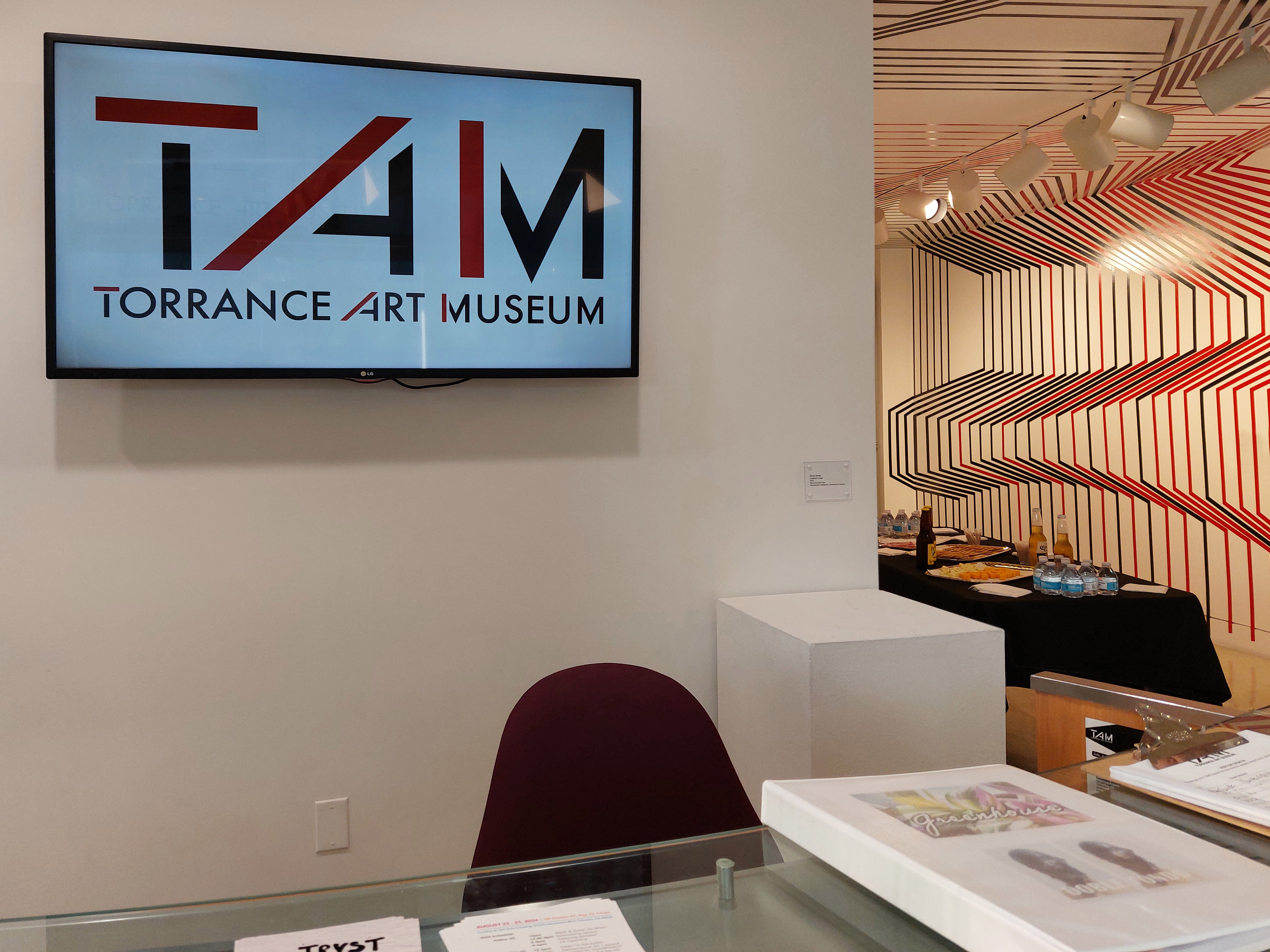
Interior in 2024

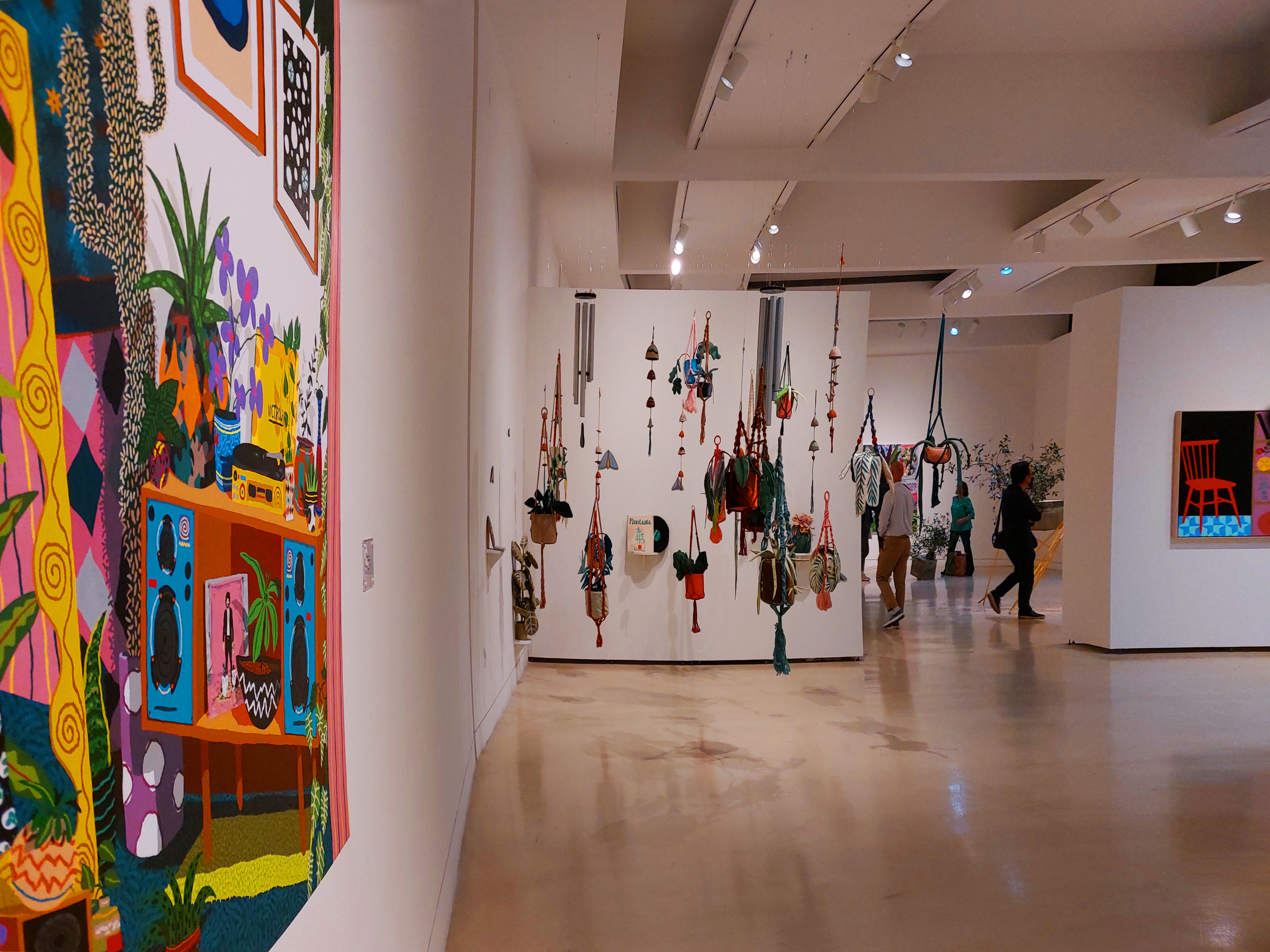
Exposition in 2024

== History ==
Fine Arts Supervisor Erica Grubb was the first to recognize the potential of the Joslin Recreation Center. She developed art classes for adults and children, organized exhibitions, tours to famous art institutions and other social events. She created the Joslyn Fine Arts Gallery in 1964. Beginning in 1978, Grubb pushed the Joslyn to become a permanent art gallery, believing that emerging artists needed to broaden their exposure to contemporary art.

== Activity ==
According to «Blouin Modern Painters» magazine's «Top Curators to Watch», TAM is on the list of the most famous art spaces, along with the Tate Modern, LACMA, MoMA, New Museum, MoMA, Whitney Museum, ICA and others.

They organized further editions of the TRYST/NOMAD Alternative Art Fair in 2024 and 2025. For the TRYST project, the organizers invited independent and institutionally free artist-run spaces from countries such as Germany, United Kingdom, Spain, France, The Netherlands, Germany, Albania, Turkey, Romania, Ukraine, Greece, Switzerland, Mexico, Japan, South Korea, and Australia.

TAM's exhibitions are mostly male (53%), with female artists at 46%. The most exhibited artist is Ichiro Irie. The average age is 46. The highest-ranked exhibited artists are Faris McReynolds, Gerhard Richter, and Wolfgang Tillmans.
