= A Birch Grove =

1879 painting by Arkhip Kuindzhi

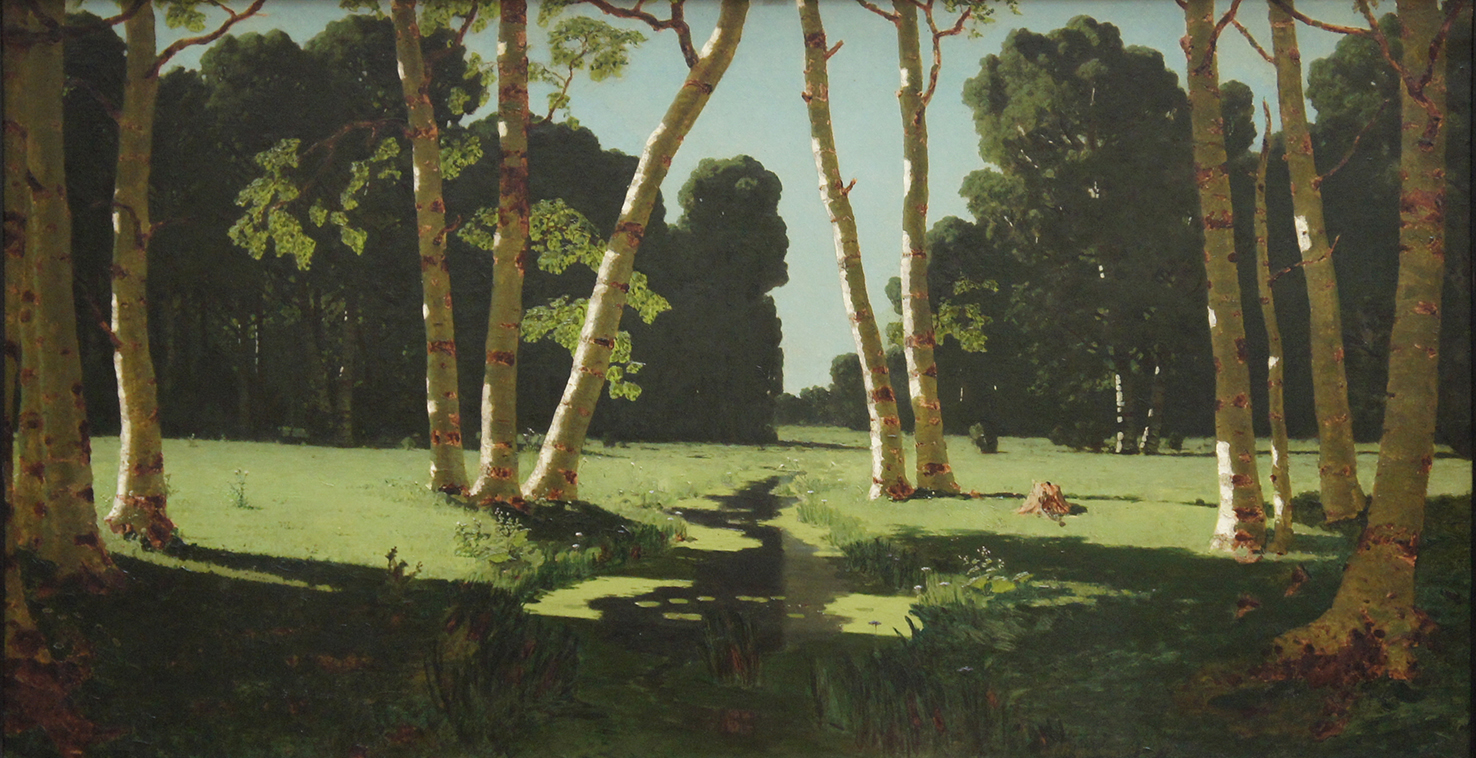
- Artist: Arkhip Kuindzhi
- Year: 1879
- Medium: Oil on canvas
- Dimensions: 97 cm × 181 cm (38 in × 71 in)
- Location: State Tretyakov Gallery, Moscow

A Birch Grove is a landscape by the Russian artist Arkhip Kuindzhi (1842–1910), completed in 1879. It is kept in the State Tretyakov Gallery (inventory 882). The size of the painting is 97 by 181 centimetres (38 in × 71 in). The canvas depicts birch trees growing in a sunny forest clearing. The unusual combinations of light and color and sharp contrast of sun and shadow create the impression of very bright sunlight. The upper parts of the birches are not shown; only the trunks and small branches are visible, which stand out in light green against the background of the dark green forest. The composition is divided into two parts by a stream running through the middle.

Together with two other paintings by the artist (After the Rain and North), A Birch Grove was presented at the 7th Exhibition of the Society of Travelling Art Exhibitions ("Peredvizhniki"), which opened in St. Petersburg in February 1879. The artist Ivan Kramskoy reported that Kuindzhi's works were enthusiastically received by the public. In particular, the visitors to the exhibition noted the "extraordinary nature" of A Birch Grove. Immediately after the exhibition, all three paintings were purchased by the Russian businessman Pavel Tretyakov for 6,500 rubles.

Art critic Vladimir Stasov noted that A Birch Grove is a painting "with wonderfully illuminated trees and grass", and that in this work Kuindzhi "takes notes of strong spectacular lighting, which no one has tried before". Art historian Faina Maltseva wrote that A Birch Grove is an "innovative work" that is one of the best examples of realistic landscapes of the 1870s. According to the art historian Vitaly Manin, "there was no picture in Russian landscape painting where a bright sunny day was captured so joyfully and enlightened, where the artist's peaceful feeling was so fully expressed, where a bright sense of peace, uplifted mood received such a perfect embodiment".

== History ==
=== Previous events ===
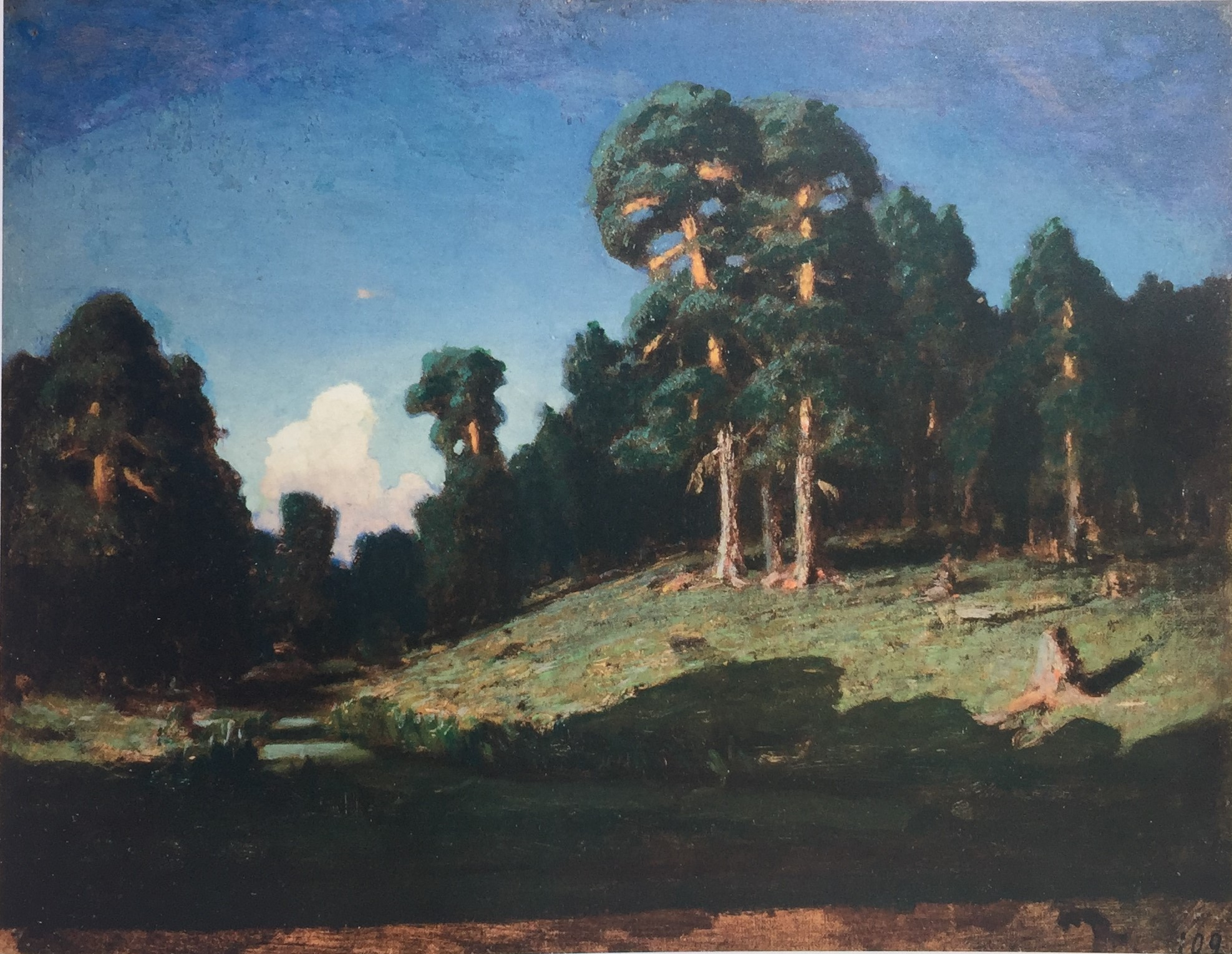
Arkhip Kuindzhi. Pine Forest with River (1878, State Russian Museum of Fine Arts)

From 1866 Arkhip Kuindzhi lived in St. Petersburg. He worked in a photo studio as a retoucher, then began attending classes at the Academy of Arts, and in 1868 received the title of non-class artist. From 1868, Kuindzhi exhibited his works at the Annual Exhibitions of the Academy of Arts, as well as at the exhibitions of the Society for the Encouragement of Artists. In 1872, he was awarded the title of artist of the 3rd class. Kuindzhi made his debut at the Peredvizhniki exhibitions in 1874, at the 3rd Society's of Travelling Art Exhibitions his landscape A Forgotten Village was exhibited. In 1875 he became a member of the society. Kuindzhi's canvas Ukrainian Night, presented at the 5th Travelling Exhibition (opened in March 1876), and then successfully exhibited at the 1878 Exposition Universelle in Paris, attracted much attention. In 1878, the Council of the Academy of Arts awarded Kuindzhi the title of artist of the 1st class.

According to some information, Kuindzhi worked on sketches depicting birch trees from 1876. Researchers of the artist's work believe that one of the first studies directly related to the idea of the painting A Birch Grove, could be a landscape from 1878, Pine Forest with a River (canvas on cardboard, oil, 25.6 × 33.4 cm, 1878, State Russian Museum, inv. Zh-1114), the composition of which is close to Ivan Shishkin's canvas A Ship Grove. While working on the future painting A Birch Grove, Kuindzhi did a number of sketches, most of which date back to 1879. At least five painting sketches are known to exist: three of them are kept in the State Russian Museum, and one each in the State Tretyakov Gallery and the State Art Museum of Nizhny Novgorod. From 1876 Kuindzhi lived and worked in a house at the intersection of Maly Prospect and 16th Street of Vasilyevsky Island. It was there that he worked on the painting A Birch Grove, begun in 1878 and completed in early 1879.

=== The 7th Exhibition of the Association of Travelling Art Exhibitions ===
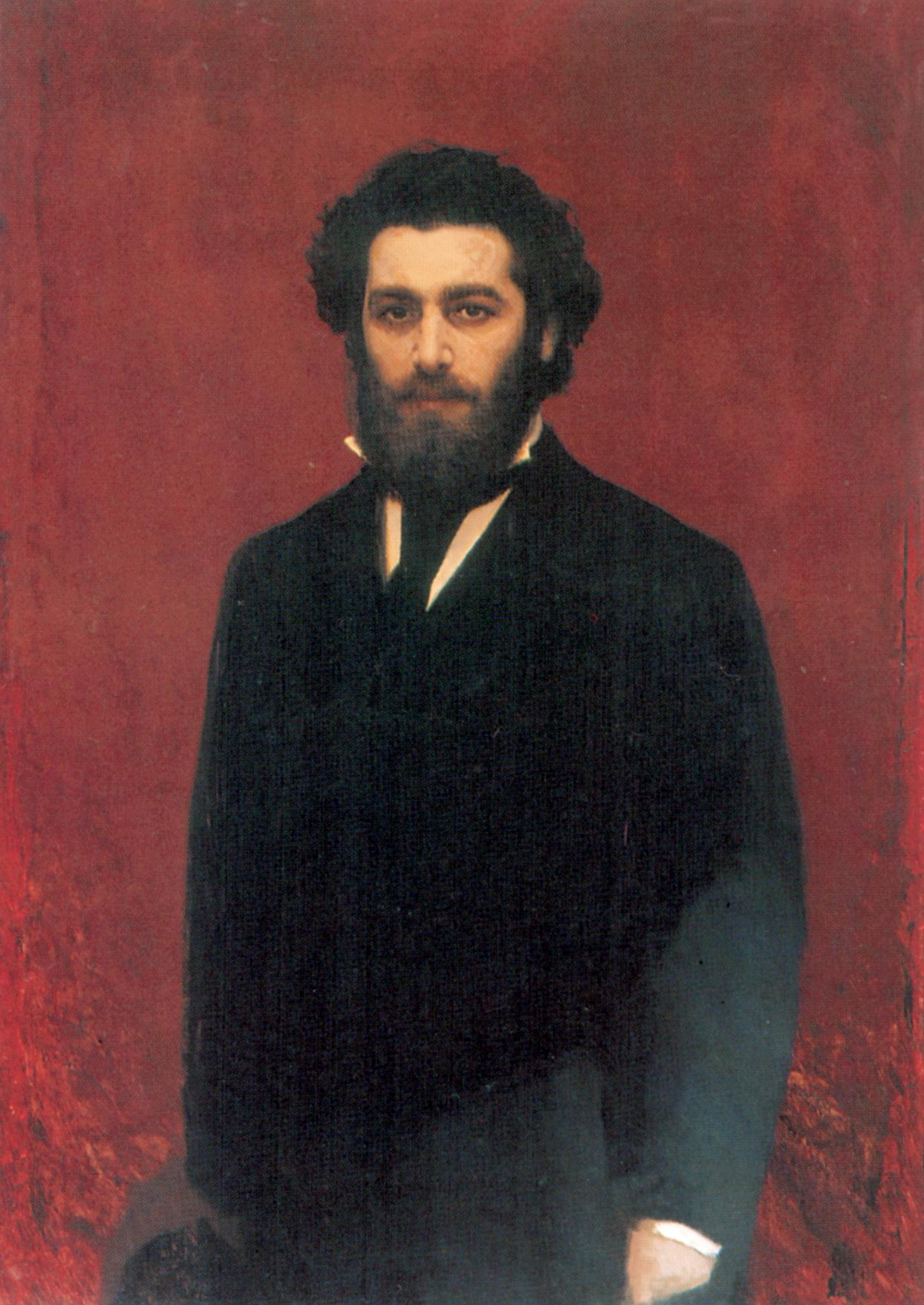
Ivan Kramskoy. Portrait of A. I. Kuindzhi (late 1870s, NIM RAH)

The canvas A Birch Grove was exhibited for the first time in 1879 at the 7th Exhibition of the Society of Travelling Art Exhibitions ("Peredvizhniki"), together with two other paintings by the artist: After the Rain and North. The exhibition was opened on February 23, 1879 in St. Petersburg, where it lasted until March 25. The opening of the exhibition was delayed, mainly due to the unreadiness of Kuindzhi's landscapes. According to the artist Ivan Kramskoi, "the hall was being cleared, and Kuindzhi could not yet hang it, and it is too necessary to have it". In a letter to Vasily Polenov dated February 18, Kramskoi reported, "Kuindzhi is delaying, and he has things that are too important to ignore". The delay was a source of irritation for the organizers of the Moscow section of the touring exhibition — in a letter to Kramskoi on February 23, the artist Ilya Repin wrote: "Kuindzhi is not ready? Seven are not waiting for one; and it was very easy to add him after the opening". Kuindzhi's canvases appeared in the exhibition two days after its opening — on February 25. According to Kramsky, "Kuindzhi exhibited the paintings and did not spoil them, although he neither improved them".

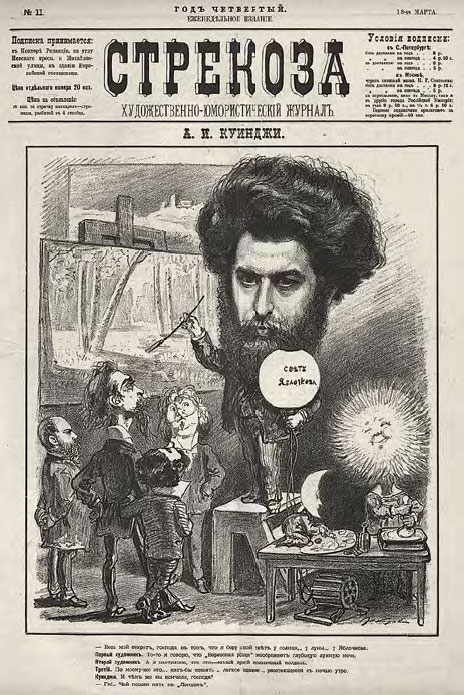
Alexander Lebedev. Kuindzhi. Yablochkov Candle (caricature in the magazine Strekoza, 1879)

The greatest impression was made by A Birch Grove — both artists and spectators who visited the exhibition noted "the extraordinary nature of the picture", which later became one of Kuindzhi's most famous works. Some of the artists' reviews of A Birch Grove are known from the words of contemporaries: Ivan Shishkin said: "This is not a painting, and from it you can write a picture...", and Vladimir Orlovsky admitted: "I never thought, never imagined that it was possible to bring the picture to such relief. It is not a picture, it is nature". In a letter to Pavel Tretyakov dated March 1, 1879, Ivan Kramskoi wrote about the reaction caused by the appearance of Kuindzhi's paintings at the exhibition: "The public received them enthusiastically, artists (that is, landscape artists) at the first moment dazed, they did not prepare, a long time were with open jaws and only now begin to gather their courage and then angrily, then secretly let various rumors and opinions, many reach a high comic in the denial of his paintings, so... cheers!" Some viewers suspected Kuindzhi of being a magician and believed the rumors that had spread that "the picture was painted on glass and illuminated from behind by a lamp".

On March 15, the newspaper Novoe Vremya (No. 1093, p. 4) published a detailed review by Vladimir Stasov entitled "Art Exhibitions of 1879", which praised Kuindzhi's "unusually poetic feeling and view" and also noted the originality of his paintings. Kuindzhi's popularity was also evidenced by Alexander Lebedev's friendly caricature "Kuindzhi. Yablochkov Candle", which was placed on the cover of the magazine Strekoza (No. 11, March 18, 1879) — the caricature depicted the artist standing next to A Birch Grove. Directly from the exhibition, all three of Kuindzhi's paintings, including A Birch Grove, were bought from the artist by Pavel Tretyakov for 6,500 rubles.

The Moscow part of the 7th Travelling Exhibition was opened on April 22, 1879. Shortly thereafter, the newspaper Molva (No. 112, April 25, 1879) published an article "Brief notes (on reviews of art exhibitions and on the paintings of Mr. Kuindzhi)" signed by the pseudonym "Lubitel". "Lubitel" spoke negatively about Kuindzhi's work and sharply criticized his paintings exhibited at the exhibition. In particular, he wrote: "Anyone who has ever observed in nature the relations of tones that give sunlight, who has ever studied the laws of transitions of one tone into another with different light effects, will agree that the light effects in Kuindzhi's paintings are exaggerated and completely wrong". As for the A Birch Grove, "Lubitel" wrote that the trees in it do not grow, and "rastykana", they are "precisely cut out of cardboard, painted in a dirty-green shade and placed as a decoration". In December 1879 it turned out that the author hiding behind the pseudonym "Lubitel" was one of the founding members of the organization of artist-pervizhniks, Mikhail Clodt. Angered by this act, Kuindzhi decided to withdraw from the partnership, which was finalized in early 1880. Thus, the 1879 exhibition presenting A Birch Grove became the last traveling exhibition with his participation.

=== Later events ===
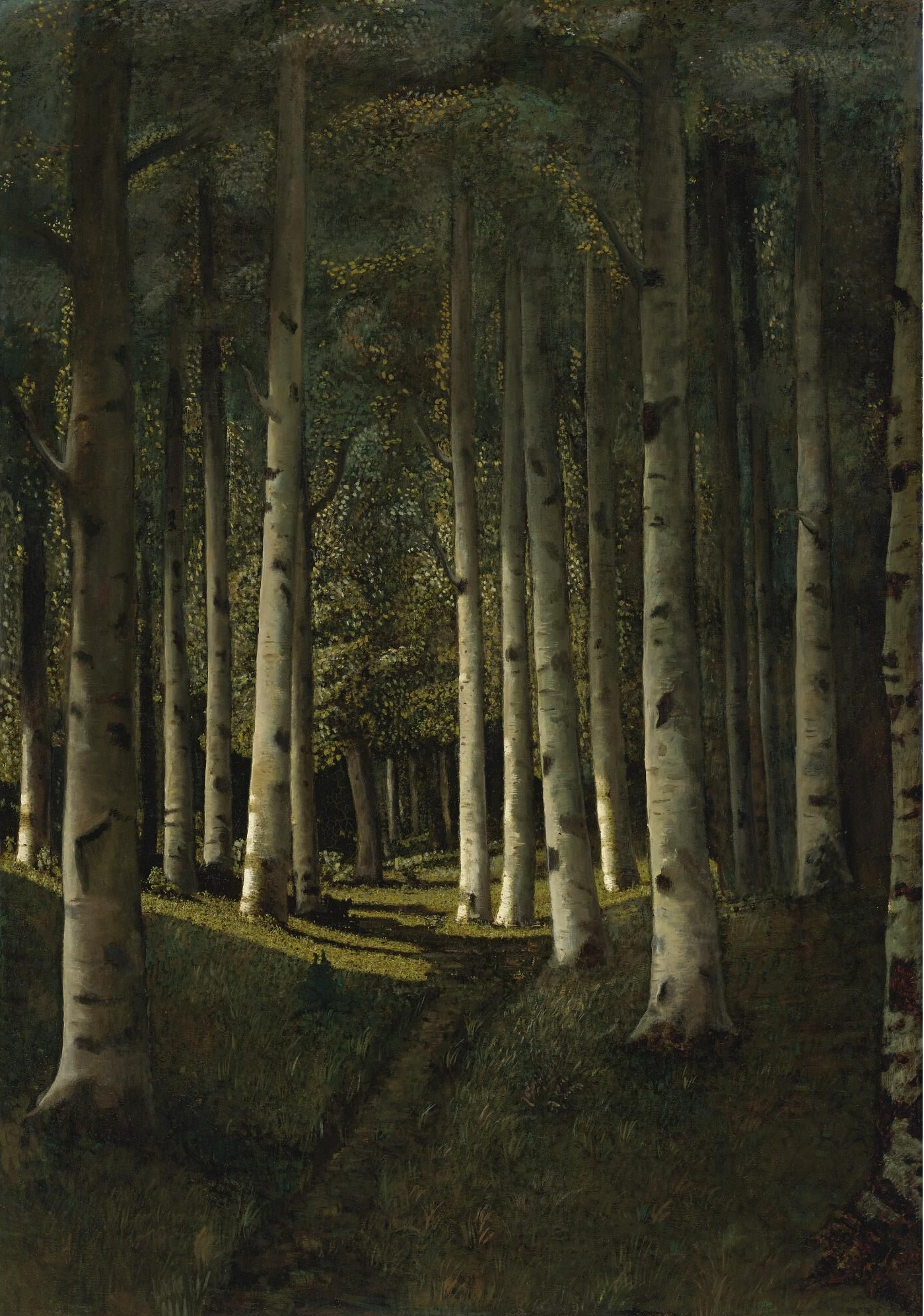
Arkhip Kuindzhi. A Birch Grove (2nd variant, 1881, private collection)

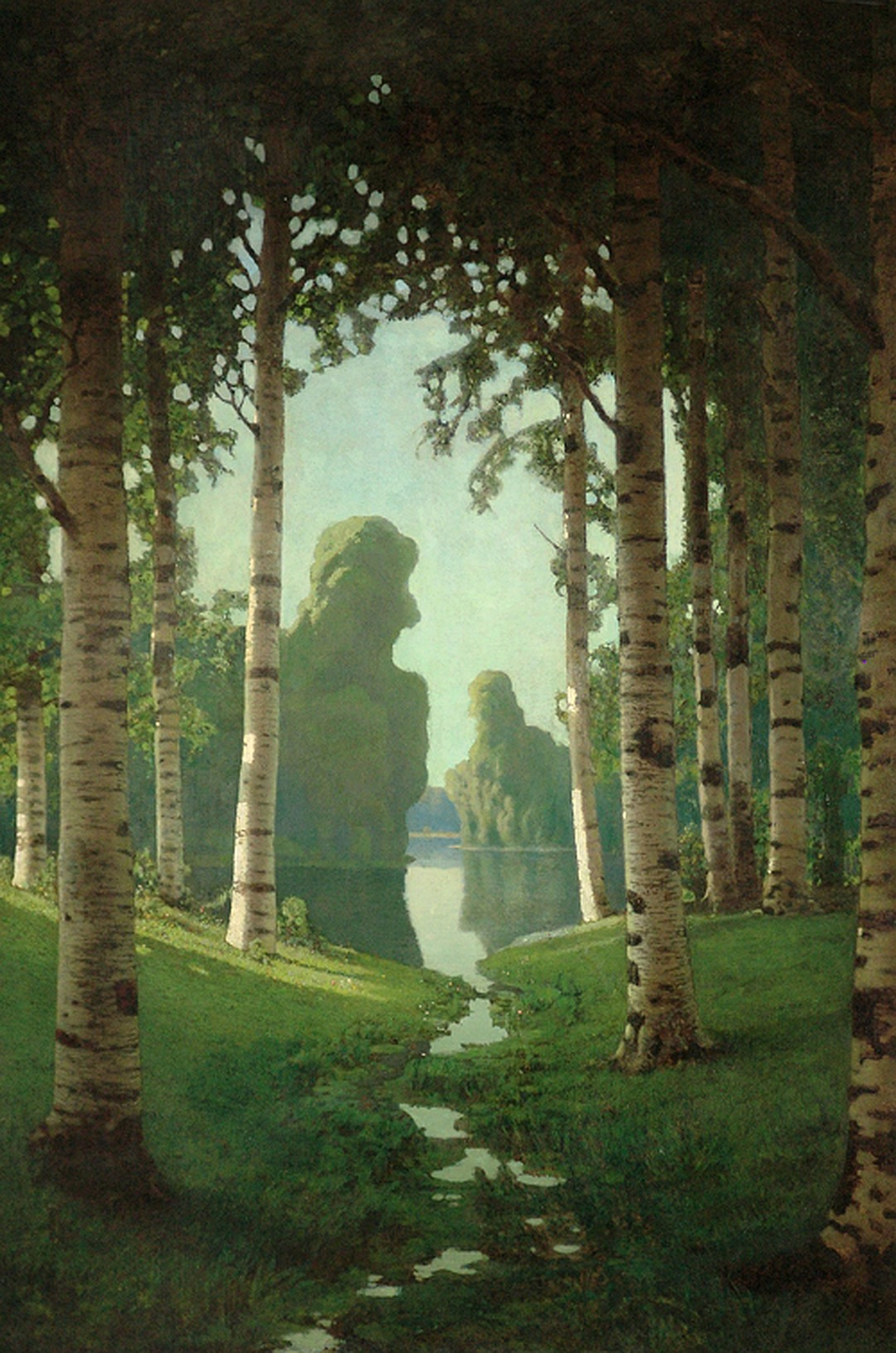
Arkhip Kuindzhi. A Birch Grove (3rd variant, 1901, The National Art Museum of the Republic of Belarus)

In September 1880 Kuindzhi finished the painting Moonlit Night on the Dnieper. In October and November of the same year the painting was exhibited in the building of the Society for the Encouragement of Artists, on Bolshaya Morskaya Street in St. Petersburg, and it was the first time in the history of Russian art when the only painting was shown at the exhibition.

In 1882, Kuindzhi organized another personal exhibition, which included three paintings: the second version of the canvas A Birch Grove (1881), the second version of the painting Night on the Dnieper, as well as a new work, Dnieper in the Morning (now in the State Tretyakov Gallery). The exhibition was held in Solodovnikov's house on Kuznetsky Most and the paintings were displayed in daylight. This exhibition turned out to be the last public exhibition in Kuindzhi's creative activity: until the end of his life he continued to create new works, but did not show them to the public.

For a long time, almost nothing was known about Kuindzhi's new works. In 1901, he organized several private exhibitions, where four works were presented to close acquaintances: A Birch Grove (1901, now in the Belarusian National Arts Museum), a revised Evening in Ukraine (1878, completed in 1901, now in the GRM), Dnieper (1901, now in the Pskov Museum-Reserve, a variant of the painting Dnieper in the Morning, 1881) and Christ in the Garden of Gethsemane (1901, now in the Vorontsov Palace-Museum, Alupka).

Subsequently, A Birch Grove (the original version, created in 1879 and purchased by Pavel Tretyakov) was exhibited at a number of exhibitions, including the exhibition in the Tretyakov Gallery dedicated to the 25th anniversary of the death of P.M. Tretyakov (1923) and the exhibition of Russian art of the 18th–20th centuries (1957, Beijing). From 1971 to 1972 the canvas appeared in the exhibition Landscape Painting of the Peredvizhniki (Kiev, Leningrad, Minsk, Moscow) on the occasion of the centenary of the Society for Travelling Art Exhibitions, in 1983–198 — in the exhibition of the Academy of Arts of the USSR (Moscow); and in 1992, in the exhibition dedicated to the 150th anniversary of the birth of Kuindzhi (Moscow). It was also one of the exhibits of the exhibition of the works of Arkhip Kuindzhi, held from October 2018 to February 2019 in the technical building of the Tretyakov Gallery. As of 2020, the painting A Birch Grove was exhibited in room 21 of the main building of the Tretyakov Gallery on Lavrushinsky Lane.

== Description ==
A Birch Grove is in the style of romantic landscape. As in other works by Kuindzhi, a significant effect is achieved by unusual combinations of light and color, sharp contrast of sun and shadow, which creates the impression of very bright sunlight. A forest clearing flooded with bright sunlight occupies the dominant position on the canvas. In the background, it is enclosed by dense, tall trees whose green silhouettes form a kind of living fence. The composition is divided into two parts by a stream running through the middle, covered with lemna, and by the gap between the trees in the distance.

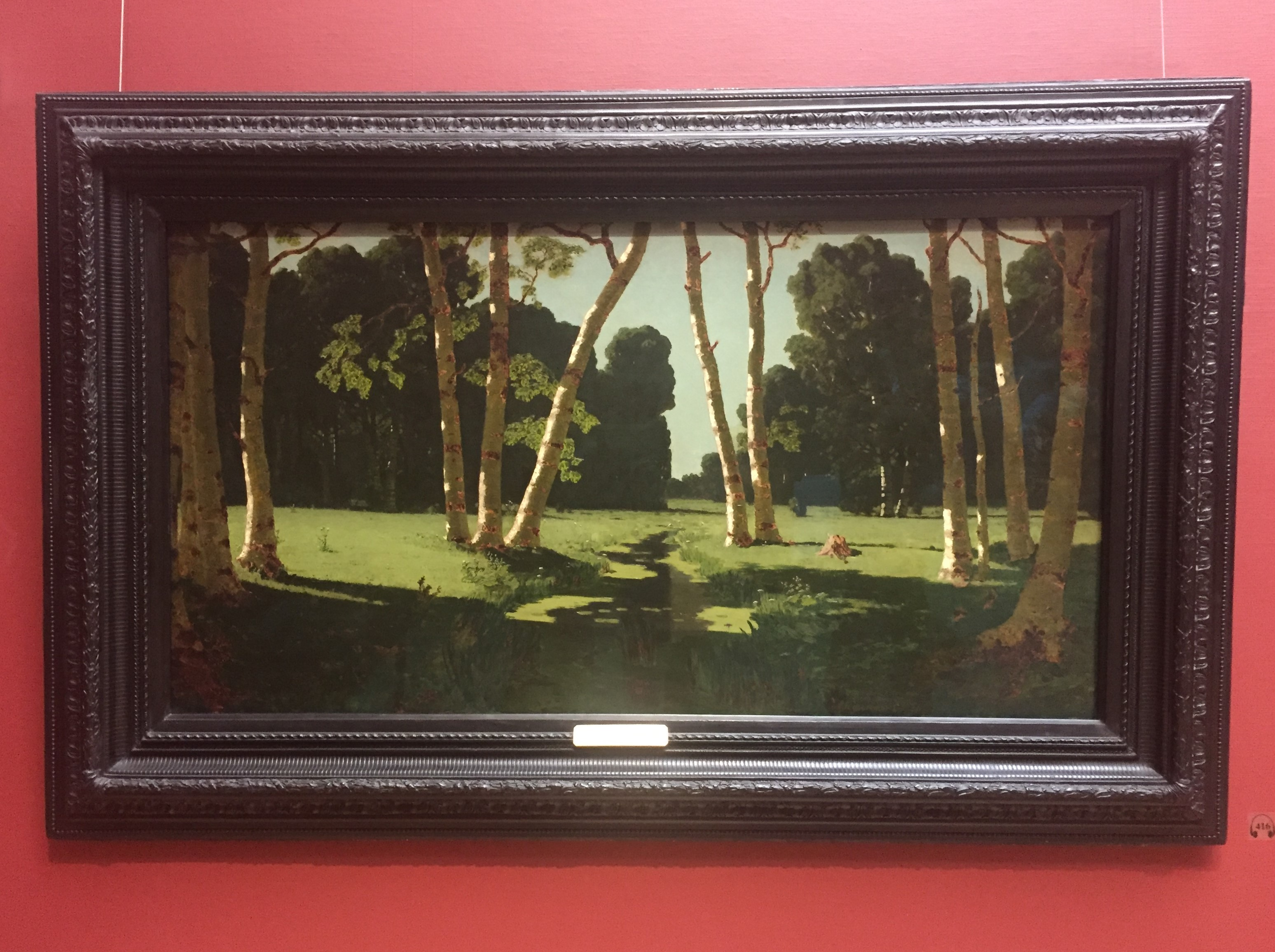
Painting A Birch Grove in the State Tretyakov Gallery

The arrangement of the birches growing in the clearing in the foreground preserves this "accentuated symmetrical division of the compositional plans of the painting". The upper part of the birches is not shown, only their trunks — brownish-greenish in the shade and bright white where they face the sun, and small branches with fresh leaves that stand out in light green against the dark green forest in the background. In the words of the artist Arkady Rylov, "real is this joy that sparkles under the fragrant birches". The combination of different shades of green used in painting the birch foliage and the distant forest further emphasizes the feeling of a bright sunny day.

By cutting off the crowns of nearby trees, Kuindzhi narrows the space of the painting, depriving it of its panoramic character. As a result, the composition's character is more closed and intimate, with a weakening of its national content. At the same time, according to the art historian Vitaly Manin, "the universal content, which was created by a clearly expressed bright world view, optimism, brightly filling the picture with light, is intensified".

In general, the compositional solution of A Birch Grove corresponds to the academic principles. This is particularly evident in the "backstage construction of the scene", where the trunks of the birch trees create the impression of a deep space, and the dark trees play the role of a theatrical flat. Another academic technique is the use of traditional "triangles" formed by a lighted meadow, a bright sky, and a shaded stream; the apexes of these triangles converge at the intersection of the diagonals of the canvas. The well-considered linear construction is based on clear perspective cuts. The impression of natural depth of space is achieved by "the spectacular alternation of sunlight and dark shadow".

A "stereoscopic" effect of painting is entirely determined by spatial construction, while "the interest in revealing the volumetric nature of the objects in A Birch Grove is clearly lost. The artist refuses the detailed development of light and shadow transitions, he "'collects' color in the plane", in each of which a small number of shades is used. According to Vitaly Manin, "from this color begins to sound more definite and intense, the emotional impact of it intensifies", as a result of which "the artist achieves the integrity of the impression".

== Sketches and variants ==
The State Tretyakov Gallery holds a sketch sharing the title A Birch Grove (canvas, oil on canvas, 27 × 46.6 cm, 1879, inv. 11088), which had been in the possession of the artist Ilya Repin from 1879 and was given by him to the artist and collector Ilya Ostroukhov in 1903. The sketch was transferred from the Ostroukhov Museum to the Tretyakov Gallery in 1929.

In the collection of the State Russian Museum there are three sketches of the same title from 1879 — inventory No. Zh-1105 (oil on paper on cardboard, 19 × 29 cm), inventory No. Zh-1107 (canvas on cardboard, oil, 19.5 × 36.8 cm) and inventory No. Zh-1110 (sketch variant, paper on cardboard, oil, 21 × 33.5 cm). All three sketches came to the Russian Museum in 1930 from the A. I. Kuindzhi Society of Artists.

Another sketch of the same title is in the collection of the State Art Museum of Nizhny Novgorod (canvas, oil, 19 × 36.4 cm, inv. Zh-1309).

Sketches of the painting 'A Birch Grove' (1879)

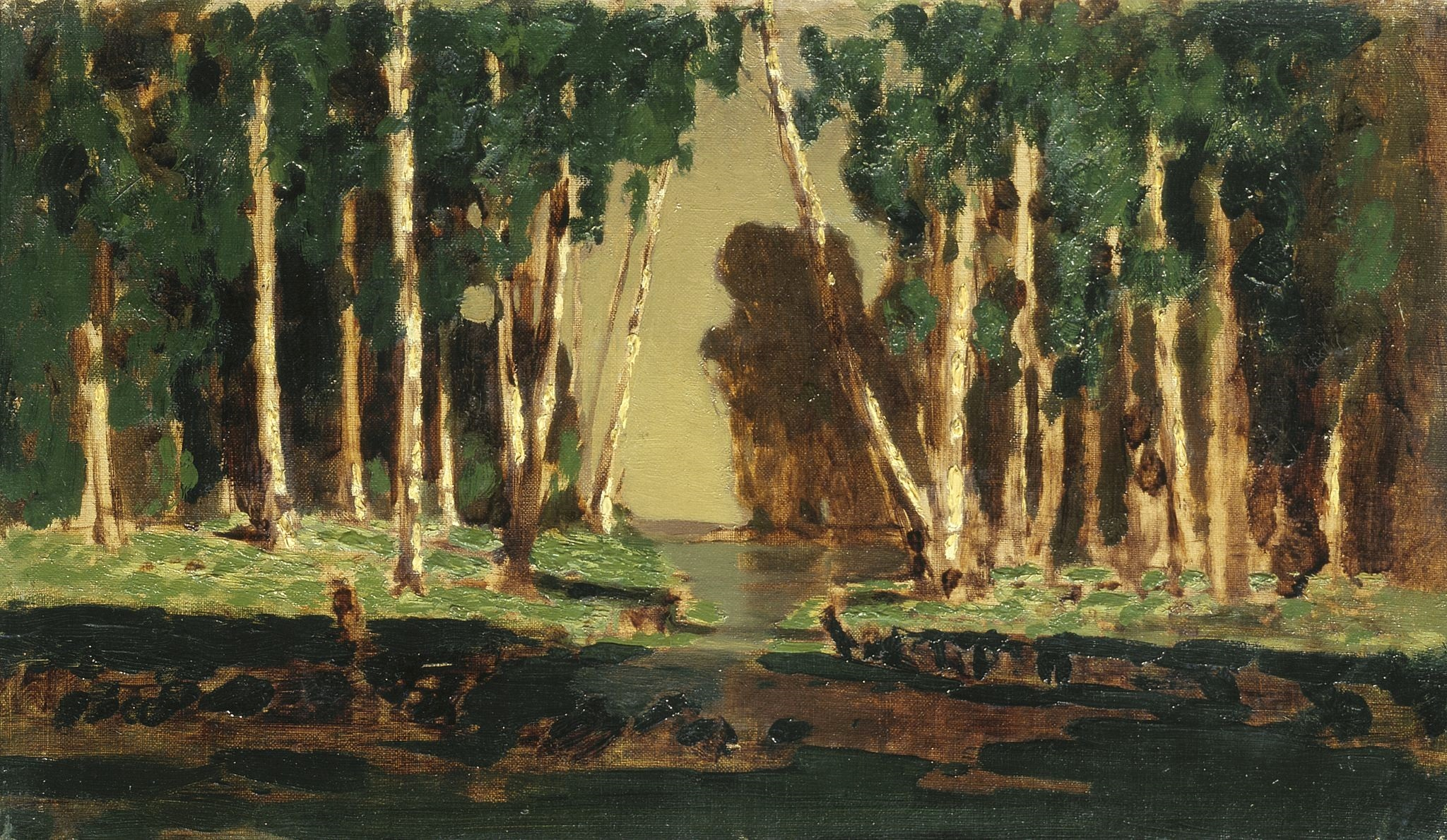
A Birch Grove, State Tretyakov Gallery, Inventory No. 11088

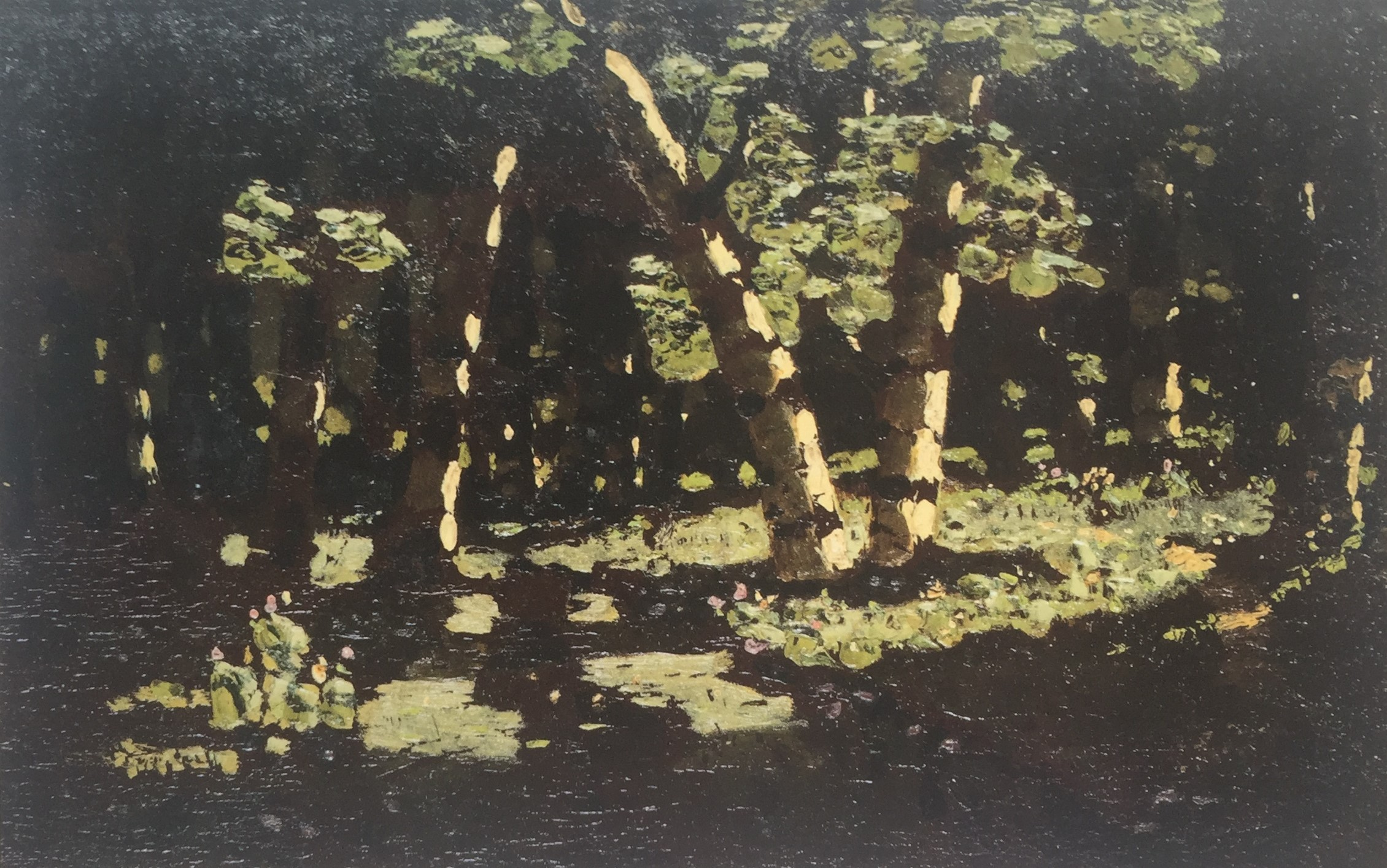
A Birch Grove, State Russian Museum, Inventory No. Zh-1105

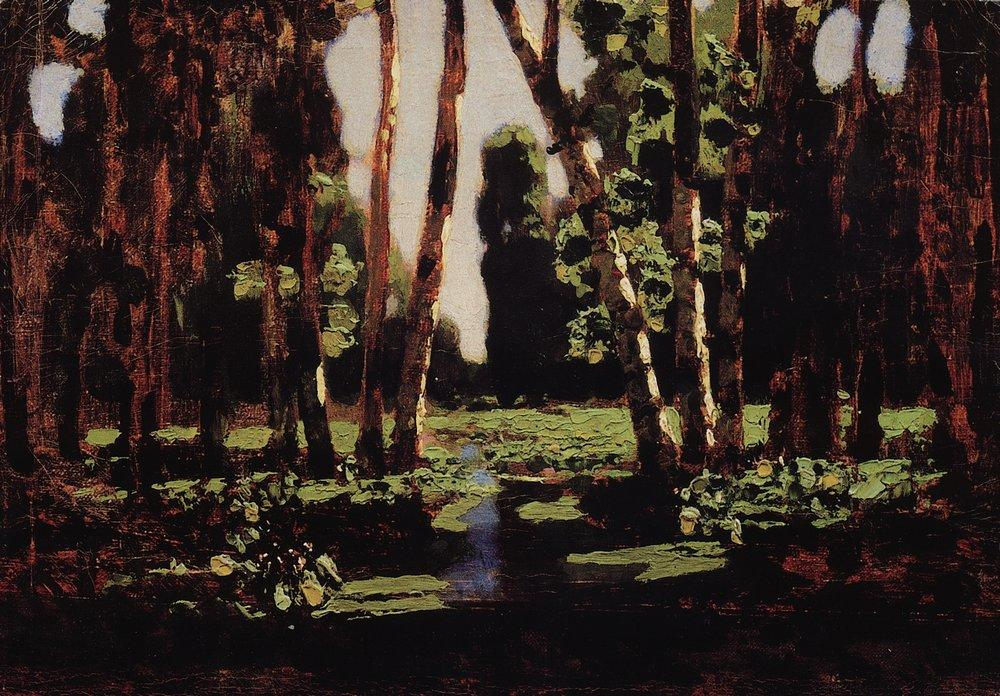
A Birch Grove, State Russian Museum, Inventory No. Zh-1107

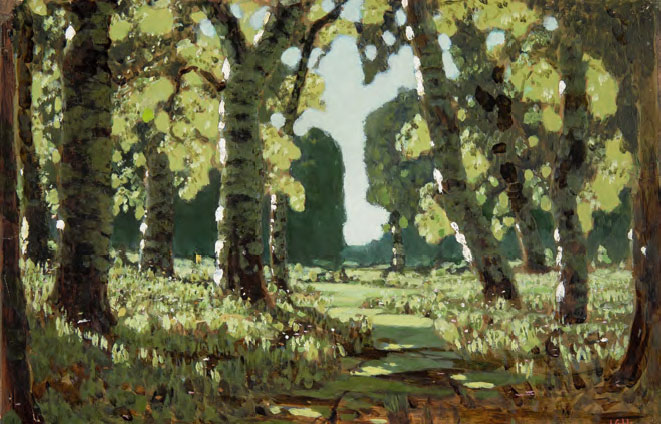
A Birch Grove, State Russian Museum, Inventory Zh-1110

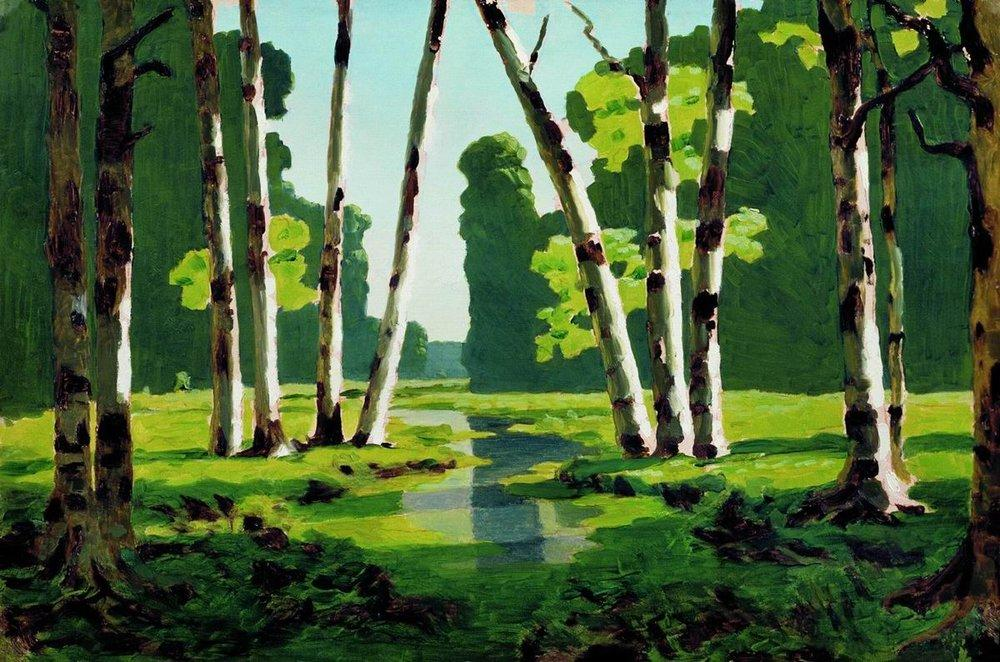
A Birch Grove, NGKhM, Inventory Zh-1309

The second version of the painting A Birch Grove (canvas, oil, 165 × 115.5 cm), presented at the exhibition in 1881, Kuindzhi wrote at the request of the industrialist and collector Pavel Demidov, Prince of San Donato, but for some reason their deal fell through. Then Kuindzhi tried to negotiate with the businessman Kozma Soldatyonkov, but he refused to buy the painting. In the end, the canvas was bought by the sugar manufacturer and collector Fyodor Tereshchenko for seven thousand rubles. For a long time the location of this variant was considered unknown, but then it was "found" in a private collection in New York. In 2008 it was sold at a Sotheby's auction for 3.065 million dollars.

The third version of the painting A Birch Grove (1901, canvas, oil, 165.5 × 116 cm) in 1910 (after the author's death) became the property of the Artists' Society named after A.I. Kuindzhi. In 1918 it was sold to L.A. Sobotsinsky; later it was in the Leningrad collection of V. I. Pavlov. I. Pavlov. As of 2018 this version was kept in the Belarusian National Arts Museum (inv. RZH-1443), where it came in 1954 from the funds of the Directorate of Art Exhibitions and Panoramas.

== Reviews and critics ==
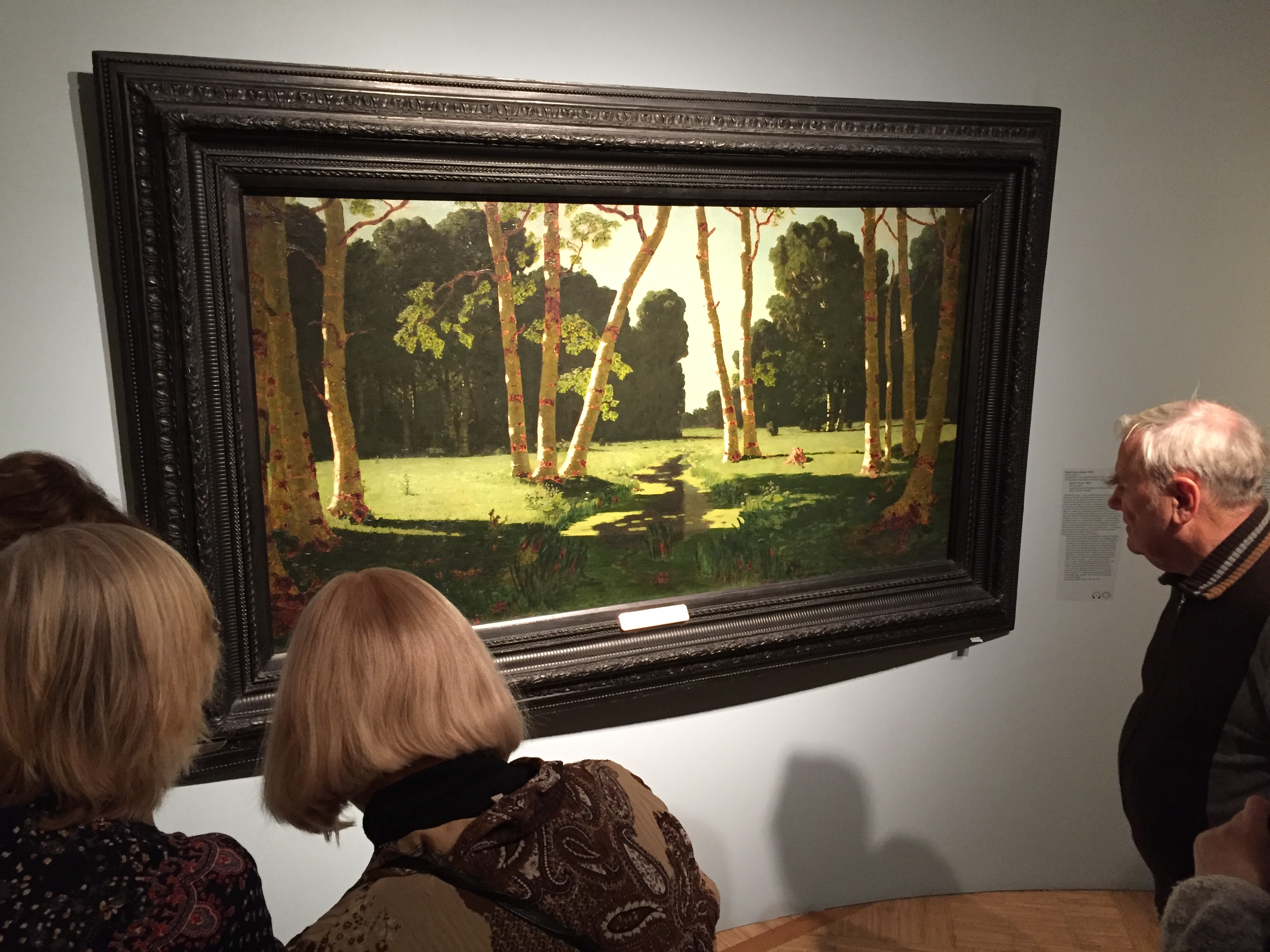
The painting A Birch Grove at the 2018–2019 exhibition at the Tretyakov Gallery

Among the many landscapes exhibited at the 7th Travelling Exhibition, art critic Vladimir Stasov highlighted the works of Ivan Shishkin, Mikhail Klodt, and Arkhip Kuindzhi. Stasov wrote that Kuindzhi "possesses what few landscape painters have — an unusually poetic feeling and look. Noting that in Kuindzhi's work "everything always consists of one strongly felt and transmitted pictorial light effect, and everything else he has not finished, not studied, sacrificed", the critic recognized that "but this motif is always something poetic!" According to Stasov, A Birch Grove — a picture "with wonderfully illuminated trees and grass", but "very bad and incredible air". He noted that "there are many shortcomings everywhere, but what is good — it is good and original, like no one else, and takes notes of strong spectacular lighting, no one has not yet tried".

The artist and critic Alexander Benois in the book История русской живописи в XIX веке ("The History of Russian Painting in the 19th Century"), the first edition of which was published in 1902, recognized that A Birch Grove once so amazed the St. Petersburg public that many thought that to achieve the effect the author of the canvas resorted to "charlatan tricks", using additional lighting from the back or front. Benois noted that in A Birch Grove "we are now strongly disgusted by its crude form", "especially unpleasant is the ill-conceived "simplification", backstage construction, hitting the diorama trompe-l'œil; at the same time, "it is already honorable that Kuindzhi felt the need for this simplification". Paying tribute to the artist's skill, Benois wrote that studying this painting "one is filled with great respect for its creator," who "made sure that every stroke 'meant' and sounded, that nothing was superfluous. According to Benois, in A Birch Grove is "remarkable for its bold, clear colors, not indifferent and technique".

In an article dedicated to the 150th anniversary of Arkhip Kuindzhi's birth, art historian Vladimir Petrov wrote that A Birch Grove particularly brightly and directly embodies Kuindzhi's "sun worship". According to Petrov, on the basis of the everyday Central Russian motif, which includes a forest edge and flowing between white birch trees, the artist "created a hymn" pouring from the sky life-giving light. Petrov noted the "elevated and festive tone of the picture's imagery," which Kuindzhi achieved "with the help of bold generalization and intensity of contrasts, glowing in the sun and shaded color forms and zones, as well as rhythmic definition of the landscape solution, reminiscent of a kind of natural pattern and, to some extent, decoration ..."

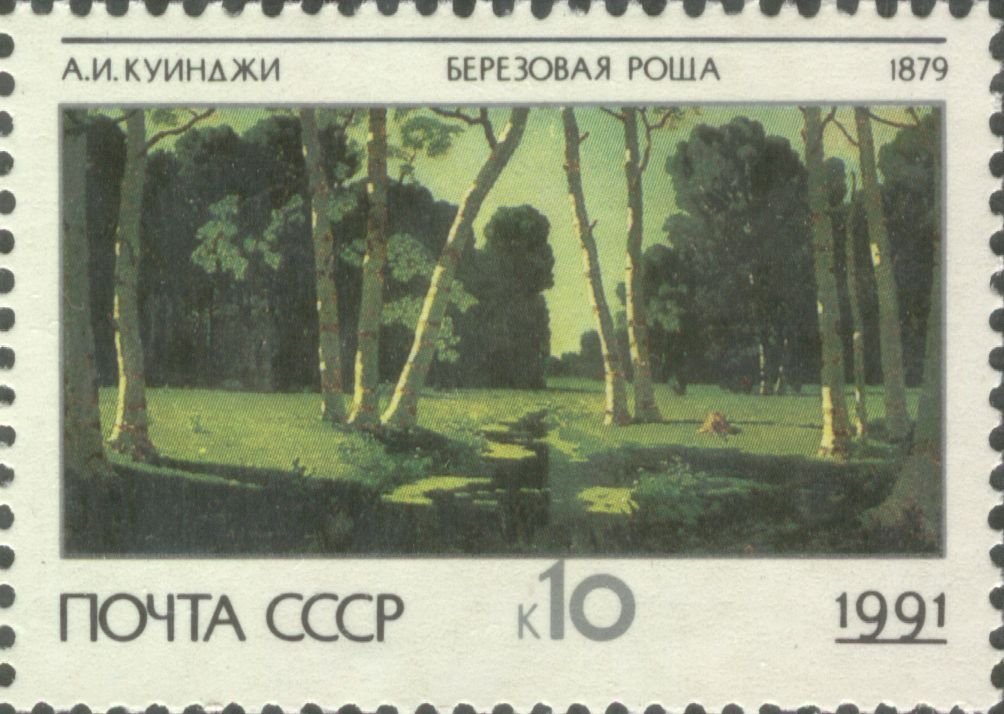
Painting A Birch Grove on a 1991 USSR postage stamp

Art historian Faina Maltseva noted that A Birch Grove is "an innovative work", one of the best examples of realistic landscapes of the 1870s. At the same time, in her opinion, "some features of his painting raise legitimate objections among viewers". Maltseva attributes such features to "traits of conventionality" manifested "in a somewhat simplified color solution" — in particular, in order to achieve the greatest intensity of color, the artist had to sacrifice "some nuances in the characterization of individual objects," as well as "that which could give the landscape more variety of life". Nevertheless, according to Maltseva, in this work "Kuindzhi managed to create a real image filled with a great sound", and his skill "manifested itself here with particular force".

The art historian Vitaly Manin wrote that in A Birch Grove Kuindzhi developed the search for a positive ideal that he had begun three years earlier in the painting Ukrainian Night. One of Kuindzhi's most important innovations, according to Manin, was "a special construction of space and, in this connection, a new plastic understanding of volume". In addition, according to Manin, the "innovative essence" of the canvas could be attributed to the fact that "the artist succeeded in liberating the color, purifying it with light"; light is used as a "means of realistic transmission of nature" (from this point of view, A Birch Grove has much in common with some of Claude Monet's early works, such as Woman in the Garden). At the same time, Manin noted that the generalized painting of A Birch Grove creates a feeling of stasis, "gives the impression of numbness, of freezing". Nevertheless, according to Manin, "there was no picture in Russian landscape painting in which a bright sunny day was captured so joyfully and enlightened, in which the artist's peaceful feeling was so fully expressed, in which a bright sense of peace, uplifted mood received such a perfect embodiment".

== Bibliography ==
- Бенуа, А. Н. (1995). История русской живописи в XIX веке (in Russian). М.: Республика. p. 448.
- Воронова, О. П. (1986). Куинджи в Петербурге. Выдающиеся деятели науки и культуры в Петербурге-Петрограде-Ленинграде (in Russian). Л.: Лениздат. p. 240.
- Гомберг-Вержбинская, Э. П. (1970). Передвижники. Выдающиеся деятели науки и культуры в Петербурге-Петрограде-Ленинграде (in Russian). Л.: Искусство. p. 236.
- Ефимова, А. А. (2018). Малоизвестные страницы из жизни и творчества А. И. Куинджи (in Russian). Третьяковская галерея. pp. 70–95.
- Зименко, В. М. (1947). Архип Иванович Куинджи (in Russian). М.-Л.: Искусство. p. 32.
- Мальцева, Ф. С. (1965). Грабарь, И. Э.; Кеменов, В. С.; Лазарев, В. Н. (eds.). Пейзаж. История русского искусства (in Russian). Vol. 9. М.: Наука. pp. 362–444.
- Мальцева, Ф. С. (2001). Мастера русского пейзажа. Вторая половина XIX века. Part 2. Выдающиеся деятели науки и культуры в Петербурге-Петрограде-Ленинграде (in Russian). М.: Искусство. p. 176. ISBN 9785210013439.
- Манин, В. С. (1976). Куинджи (in Russian). М.: Изобразительное искусство. p. 208.
- Манин, В. С. (1990). Архип Иванович Куинджи. Русские живописцы XIX века (in Russian). Л.: Художник РСФСР. p. 160.
- Манин, В. С. (2000). Архип Куинджи. Мастера живописи (in Russian). М.: Белый город. p. 64.
- Nevedomskiĭ, M. P.; Repin, Ilʹi︠a︡ Efimovich (1997). "A.I. Kuindzhi". Svarog I K. Moskva. ISBN 978-5-85791-022-1.
- Petinova, E. F. (2001). Russkie khudozhniki XVIII-nachala XX veka: 50 biografiĭ. Sankt-Peterburg: Avrora. ISBN 978-5-7300-0714-7.
- Петров В. А. Архип Иванович Куинджи // Архип Иванович Куинджи. 1842—1910. К 150-летию со дня рождения. Каталог / В. А. Петров, Г. С. Чурак. — М.: Государственная Третьяковская галерея, 1992.
- Рогинская, Фрида Соломоновна (1989). Товарищество передвижных художественных выставок. Искусство. p. 430.
- Рылов, Аркадий Александрович (1954). Воспоминания. Государственное издательство.
- Сорокин, Виктор Васильевич (1991). "Памятные места на древней дороге в село Высокое (часть 2)". Наука и жизнь (3): 88–91.
- Sorokin, Viktor Vasilʹevič; Muravʹev, Vladimir Bronislavovič (2006). Po Moskve istoričeskoj. Moskva: Izdatelʹskij dom TONČU. ISBN 978-5-98339-025-6.
- Стасов, Владимир Васильевич (1968). Избранные статьи о русской живописи. Детская литература. pp. 152–170.
- Чурак, Галина Сергеевна (2018). Архип Куинджи. Государственная Третьяковская галерея. pp. 15–38. ISBN 978-5-89580-222-9.
- Архип Куинджи из собрания Русского музея / И. Н. Шувалова. — СПб.: Palace Editions, 2015. — 180 p. — ISBN 978-5-93332-526-0.
- Государственная Третьяковская галерея — каталог собрания / Я. В. Брук, Л. И. Иовлева. — М.: Красная площадь, 2001. — V. 4: Живопись второй половины XIX века, book 1, А—М. — 528 p. — ISBN 5-900743-56-X.
- Государственный Русский музей — Живопись, XVIII — начало XX века (каталог). — Л.: Аврора и Искусство, 1980. — 448 p.
- Государственный Русский музей — каталог собрания / Г. Н. Голдовский, В. А. Леняшин. — СПб.: Palace Editions, 2016. — V. 6: Живопись второй половины XIX века (К—М). — 176 p. — ISBN 978-5-93332-565-9.
- История русского искусства / М. Г. Неклюдова. — М.: Изобразительное искусство, 1980. — V. 2, book 1. — 312 p.
- Летопись жизни и творчества Архипа Ивановича Куинджи // Архип Куинджи / Т. Л. Карпова, О. Д. Атрощенко, А. А. Ефимова. — М.: Государственная Третьяковская галерея, 2018. — pp. 318–347. — 360 p. — ISBN 978-5-89580-222-9.
- Переписка И. Н. Крамского: И. Н. Крамской и П. М. Третьяков, 1869—1887. Искусство. 1953. p. 458.
- Притяжение земли // Архип Куинджи / Т. Л. Карпова, О. Д. Атрощенко, А. А. Ефимова. — М.: Государственная Третьяковская галерея, 2018. — pp. 63–120. — 360 p. — ISBN 978-5-89580-222-9.
- Товарищество передвижных художественных выставок. Письма, документы. 1869—1899 / В. В. Андреева, М. В. Астафьева, С. Н. Гольдштейн, Н. Л. Приймак. — М.: Искусство, 1987. — 668 p.
