= Chumaks Path in Mariupol =

1875 painting by Arkhip Kuindzhi

- Chumaks path in Mariupol
- Artist: Arkhip Kuindzhi
- Year: 1875
- Medium: oil on canvas
- Dimensions: 106 cm × 213 cm (42 in × 84 in)
- Location: Tretyakov Gallery, Moscow

Chumaks Path in Mariupol is an 1875 painting by Russian artist Arkhip Kuindzhi (1841/1842–1910). It is held in the collection of the State Tretyakov Gallery (inventory number 876). The painting measures 106 × 213 cm.

== Description ==
The painting is geographically linked to Mariupol, where Kuindzhi was born and raised. It depicts the southern steppes, familiar to the artist from his youth when traveling to Feodosia. The term "Chumak" historically referred to merchants and wagon drivers who traveled by oxen to the Black and Azov Seas for salt and fish, distributing these goods at markets and transporting various other commodities. Vsevolod Garshin wrote about the painting: "...Impassable mud, road, wet oxen, equally drenched Ukrainian peasants, and a wet dog diligently howling by the roadside about the dismal weather—all of it touches one's heart."

== History ==
Chumaks path in Mariupol was first exhibited at the 4th exhibition of the Peredvizhniki (the Society of Traveling Art Exhibitions) in 1875. Along with other realistic works by Kuindzhi from the early 1870s, such as Autumn Muddy Road (1872) and Forgotten Village (1874), it received positive reviews from democratic publications. This marked the culmination of Kuindzhi’s close relationship with the Peredvizhniki, and he became a full member of the society in 1875. Pavel Tretyakov purchased the painting directly from the 1875 exhibition. In 1878, Kuindzhi received the title of a first-degree Class artist for this work, along with paintings On the Island of Valaam (1873, Tretyakov Gallery), Ukrainian Night (1876, Tretyakov Gallery), and Steppe (1875, Yaroslavl Art Museum).

== Reception ==
Art historian Vladimir Petrov compared the painting to Forgotten Village, noting:

Similar moods appear in Chumaks path in Mariupol, where Kuindzhi depicted a caravan of Chumak wagons stretching across a brown steppe burnt by the summer sun and soaked by autumn rains. Details such as the Chumaks wrapped in wet sackcloth and a dog howling at the roadside are expressive. However, it would be incorrect, as some critics do, to see only a "protest sent into the void" in these gloomy works of Kuindzhi.

Writer Mikhail Nevedomsky described the painting:

The inclination towards Impressionism, towards generalized interpretation, appears decisively here. It is not individual wagons or Chumak figures, but the entire convoy, the general movement of this dark, living ribbon winding across the wide steppe, that occupies the artist. All details submerge into the general impression of gloomy steppe twilight.
