= Red Sunset on the Dnipro =

Painting by Arkhip Kuindzhi

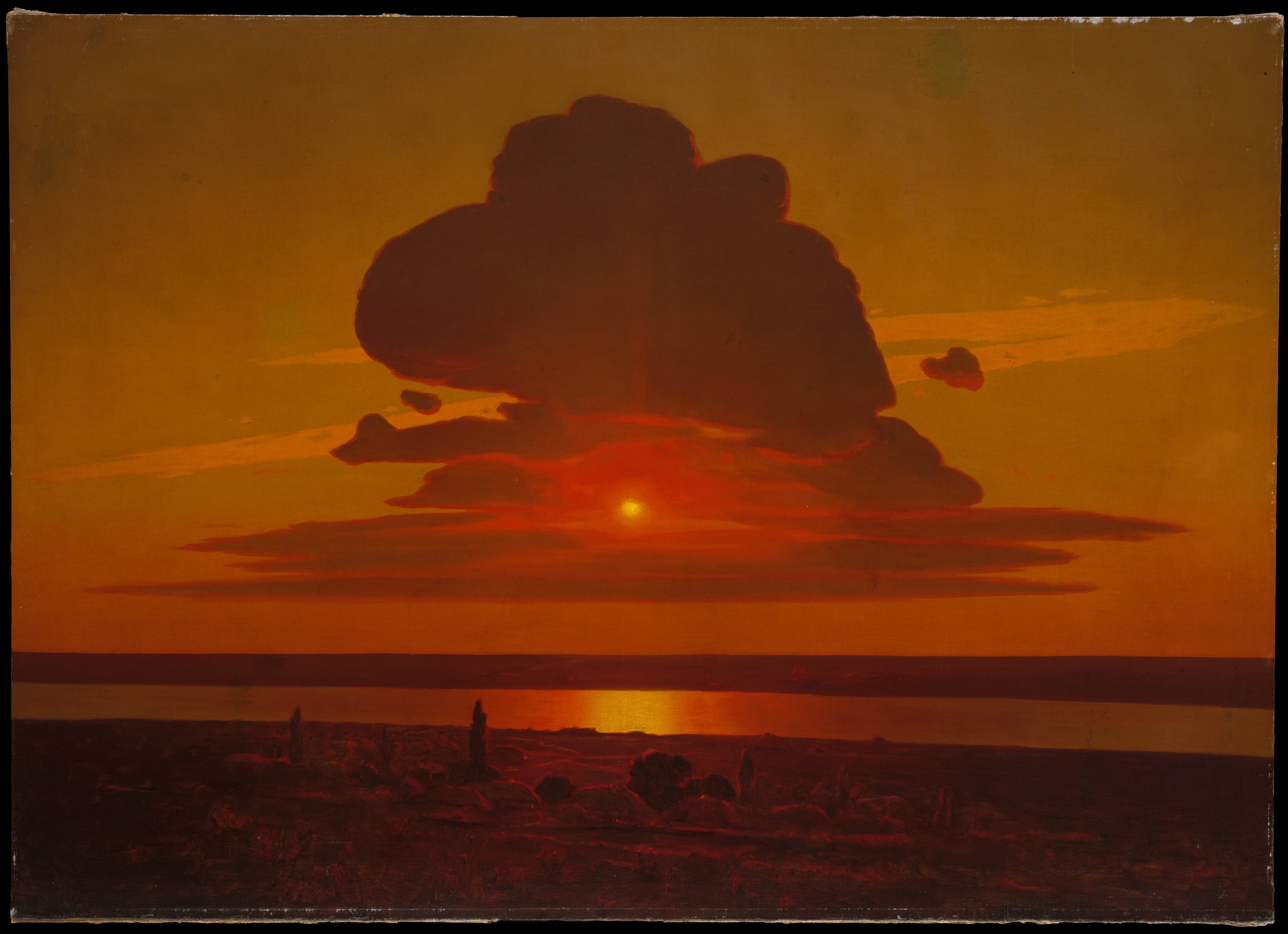
- Artist: Arkhip Kuindzhi
- Year: 1905-1908
- Medium: Oil on canvas
- Dimensions: 134.6 cm × 188 cm (53.0 in × 74 in)
- Location: Metropolitan Museum of Art, New York
- Accession: 1974.100

Red Sunset on the Dnipro or Red Sunset on the Dnieper, originally titled Red Sunset, is an oil on canvas painting by Arkhip Kuindzhi, from 1905 to 1908. It depicts a sunset in the sky above the Dnieper river. Sunset is typical of Kuindzhi's style, as he was known for his large landscapes, and can be described as a unique work of Russian luminism—a style of art not widely embraced in Imperial Russia. Kuindzhi made two sketches preceding his painting of Sunset.

== Description ==
Sunset depicts a blooming red sunset on the Dnieper river in Ukraine, then part of the Russian empire. The painting displays many of the hallmarks of Kuindzhi's style, namely the central position of a light source, incorporation of a low horizon, and aerial perspective.

Kuindzhi painted Sunset sometime between 1905 and 1908. At the time of its rendering, the painting broke with de facto conventions of Russian Realism, which had not been overly influenced by Luminism. The large painting was one of Kuindzhi's last major works. The painting was originally known as Red Sunset, with "on the Dnepr" (Dnepr being an alternative name for the Dnieper) being added by the Metropolitan Museum of Art, which acquired the painting in 1974.
