= Moonlit Night on the Dnieper =

1880 painting by Arkhip Kuindzhi

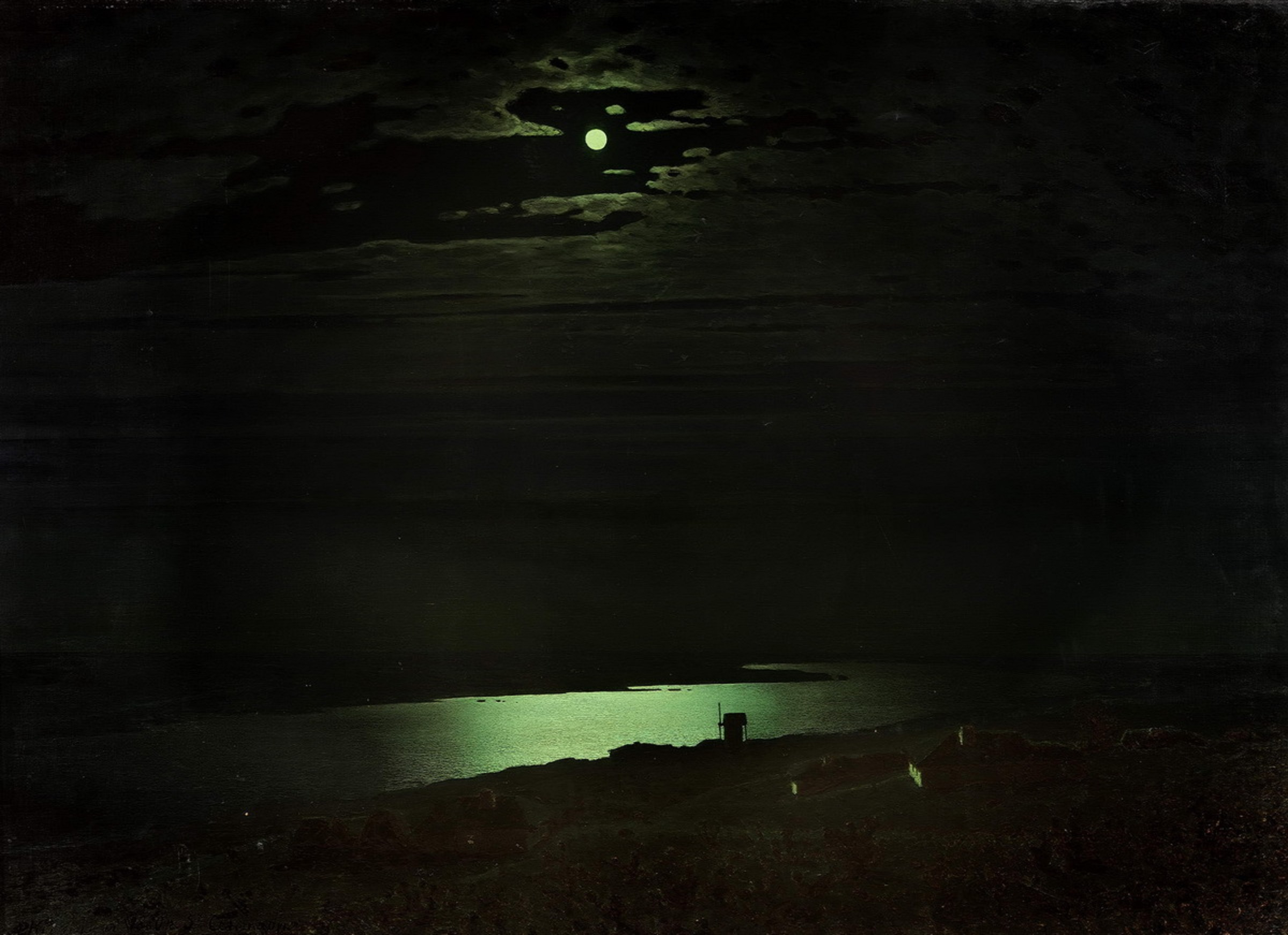
- Artist: Arkhip Kuindzhi
- Year: 1880
- Medium: Oil on canvas
- Subject: Dnieper River
- Dimensions: 105 cm × 144 cm (41 in × 57 in)
- Location: Russian Museum, Saint Petersburg

Moonlit Night on the Dnieper (Russian: Лунная ночь на Днепре) or Moonlit Night on the Dnipro is an oil on canvas painting by Russian artist Arkhip Kuindzhi, from 1880.

== Description ==
The painting displays the banks of the Dnieper river at night during a full moon. The horizon line is heavily lowered, such that a very large portion of the painting is occupied by the sky. The moonlight is reflected by the river.

== History ==
Kuindzhi began work on the painting in the summer and fall of 1880. After starting the painting process, he opened his studio to the public for two hours each Sunday for those who wished to see him working. Even before the painting's public exhibition, it was purchased from the workshop by Grand Duke Konstantin Konstantinovich. Several of Kuindzhi's correspondents and friends visited the studio while he was working on the painting to see the work. These included Ivan Turgenev, Yakov Polonsky, Ivan Kramskoi, and Dmitri Mendeleev.

When the painting was put on exhibition, it was done so in the hall of the Society for the Encouragement of Artists in Saint Petersburg. Kuindzhi was attentive to his paintings' lighting, and took extra precautions with "Moonlit Night." The painting was placed on a wall, the window curtains were lowered to block outside light, and an artificial light was centered on the painting to accentuate its features.

Unusually, "Moonlit Night" was the only painting in the exhibition, made even more strange by its apparently humble nature. It was rather small, and was just a landscape. Regardless, a crowd formed outside with a long line to see the painting, and visitors had to be allowed inside in groups to avoid a crowd crush. According to some accounts, visitors believed that the painting was illuminated from behind using a lamp because the moonlight was so realistic, and sought to find the source of light during the exhibition.

== Ownership ==
It was bought by the Grand duke Konstantinovich for 5, 000 rubels who brought the painting with him on his sea travels. The writer IvanTurgenev, fearful that the humid and salty sea air would damage the painting tried to convince the Grand Duke to deposit it at the Sedelmayer Gallery in Paris, but he refused.

The condition under which the painting was kept caused the colors of the painting to darken.

Luckily the popularity of the painting had made Kuindzhi to create two copies.

The original painting is kept at Tretyakov gallery while the other two is in the Russian State Gallery and Livadia palace.
