= Ukrainian Night =

1876 painting by Arkhip Kuindzhi

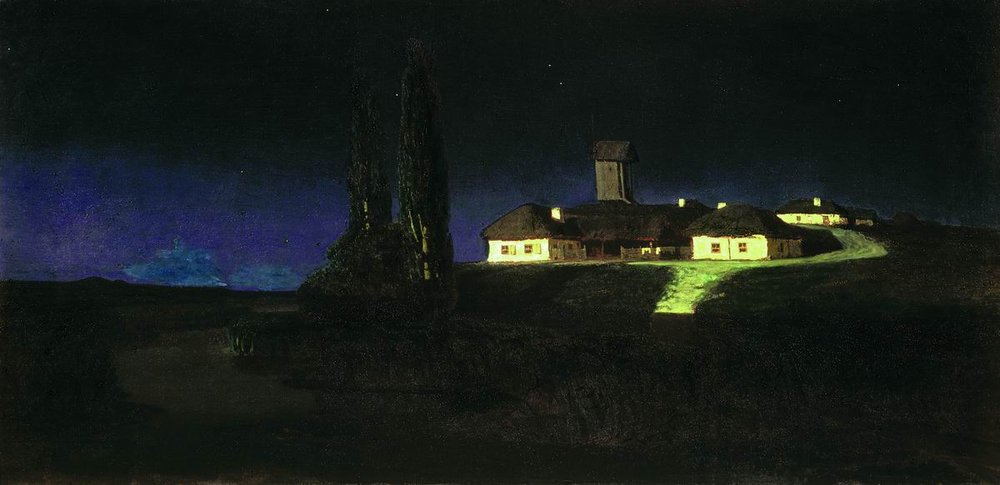
- Artist: Arkhip Kuindzhi
- Year: 1876
- Medium: oil on canvas
- Movement: Luminism
- Dimensions: 79 cm × 162 cm (31 in × 64 in)
- Location: Tretyakov Gallery, Moscow

Ukrainian Night is an oil on canvas painting by Russian artist Arkhip Kuindzhi, from 1876. The painting is part of the collection of the Tretyakov Gallery, in Moscow (inv. 879).

== History ==
The painting Ukrainian Night was first shown in 1876 at the 5th exhibition of the Association of Traveling Art Exhibitions (Peredvizhniki) and was a great success there. It was also exhibited in the Russian Art Department at the 1878 Paris Exposition. In 1878 for this painting, along with the paintings On the Island of Valaam (1873, Tretyakov Gallery), Chumatsky tract in Mariupol (1875, Tretyakov Gallery) and Steppe (1875, Yaroslavl Art Museum), Kuindzhi was awarded the title of class artist of the 1st degree.

This painting is considered a turning point in the artist's work. Starting with it, he moved away from the academic romanticism of his earlier works, and the exoticism of the image became a distinctive feature of his work. Most of the painting Ukrainian Night is painted in velvet blue-black tones, and only the light walls of the village mazanka houses in the right part of the painting shine brightly in the moonlight.

== Reviews ==
Writer Mikhail Nevedomsky, author of a biography of Kuindzhi, wrote:

But the real triumph of Kuindzhi was his painting of 1876 - Ukrainian Night, which decorated, in the true sense of the word, the fifth traveling exhibition. It can be said that it was in this piece that Kuindzhi first found himself, became on his true path, revealed all the richness of his artistic individuality. It is with Ukrainian Night that we should mark the beginning of a mature period in the work of Kuindzhi....

And art historian Vladimir Petrov wrote so in his article dedicated to the 150th anniversary of the birth of Arkhip Kuindzhi:

And in 1876 the painter showed himself an incomparable singer of the night steppe — the famous Ukrainian Night (GTG) appeared before the audience at the 5th Exhibition of the Peredvizhniki. The deep dark-blue sky studded with bright stars, white huts of a steppe village illuminated by moonlight, slender pyramidal poplars and a pond overgrown with reeds were painted by the artist with amazing boldness of light and color generalization and an unusual combination of "physiological" authenticity and true poetry of the image, making one not only marvel at the mastery of illusion, but also recall Pushkin's and Gogol's inspired descriptions of the "marvelous" Ukrainian night.

== See also ==
- Evening in Ukraine (1878)
- List of paintings by Arkhip Kuindzhi
