= Arkhip Kuindzhi =

Russian painter (1842–1910)

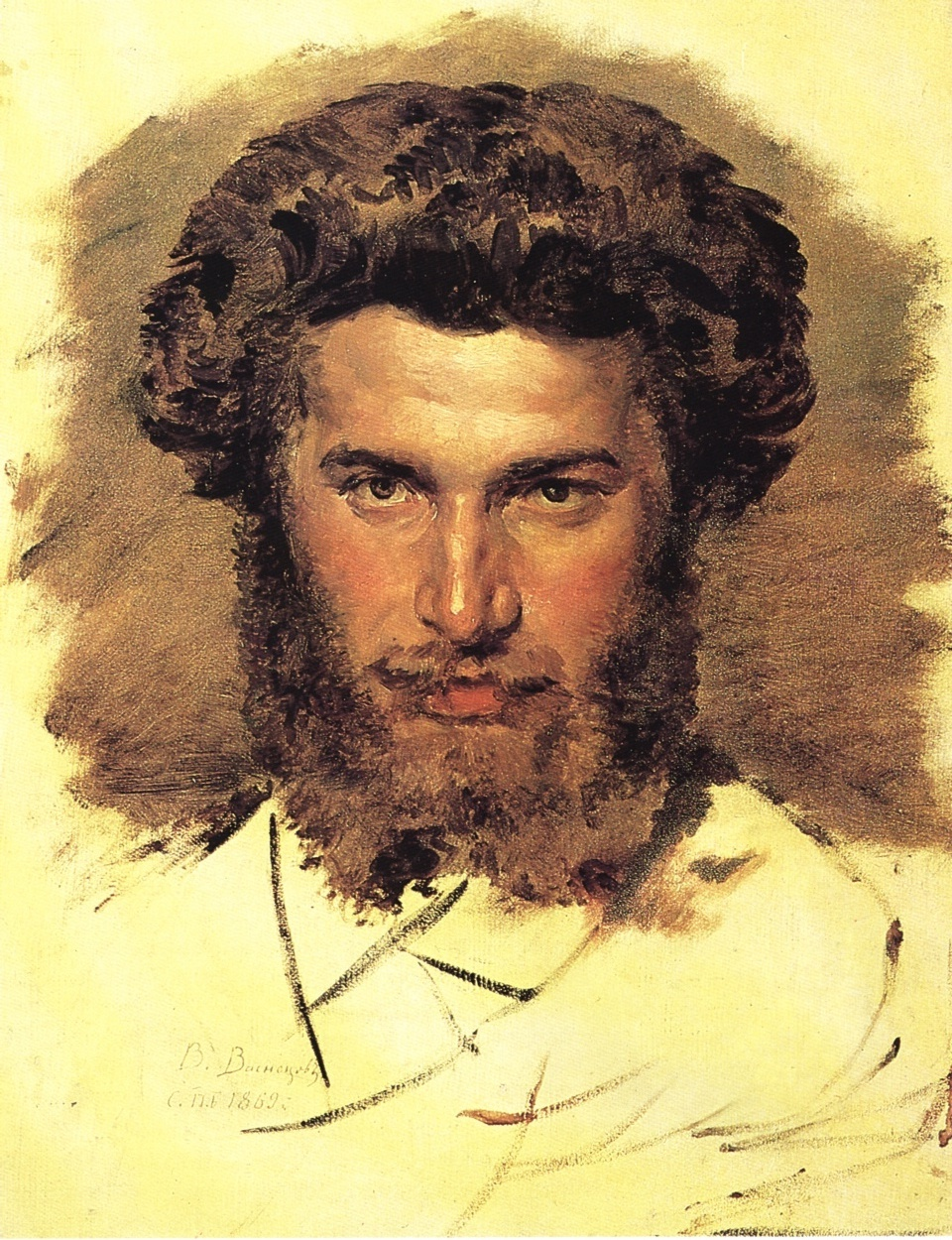
- Portrait, 1869
- Born: 27 January 1841; Mariupol uezd, Russian Empire (now in Ukraine)
- Died: 24 July 1910 (aged 69); St. Petersburg, Russian Empire
- Resting place: Tikhvin Cemetery, St. Petersburg
- Education: Imperial Academy of Arts (1868); Full Member Academy of Arts (1893)
- Notable work: Evening in Ukraine (1878–1901); Moonlit Night on the Dnieper (1880)
- Movement: Luminism
- Awards: Bronze Medal (London, 1874)
- Patrons: Pavel Tretyakov

Arkhip Ivanovich Kuindzhi (Note: Russian: Архип Иванович Куинджи [ɐrˈxʲip kʊˈindʐɨ]; Ukrainian: Архи́п Іва́нович Куї́нджі [ɑrˈxɪp kʊˈindʐɨ]; Greek: Αρχίπ Ιβάνοβιτς Κουίντζι.) (27 January [O.S. 15 January] 1841 – 24 July [O.S. 11 July] 1910) was a Russian (Note: See the following sources:) landscape painter of Urum origin.

== Date of birth ==
Kuindzhi's exact date of birth is not known. Although it was believed that he was born in 1842, the latest discoveries in archives suggest that he was born in 1841. Kuindzhi himself, when asked by St. Petersburg Academy of Arts to clarify his date of birth, "clearly wrote 1841, then, with doubt, January, and then several times crossed out the month".

The researchers believe he was born somewhere between January and March 1841. The commonly recognized date is 27 January, although Kuindzhi celebrated his name day on 19 February [N.S. 3 March] 1841, on the feast of Archippus.

== Biography ==
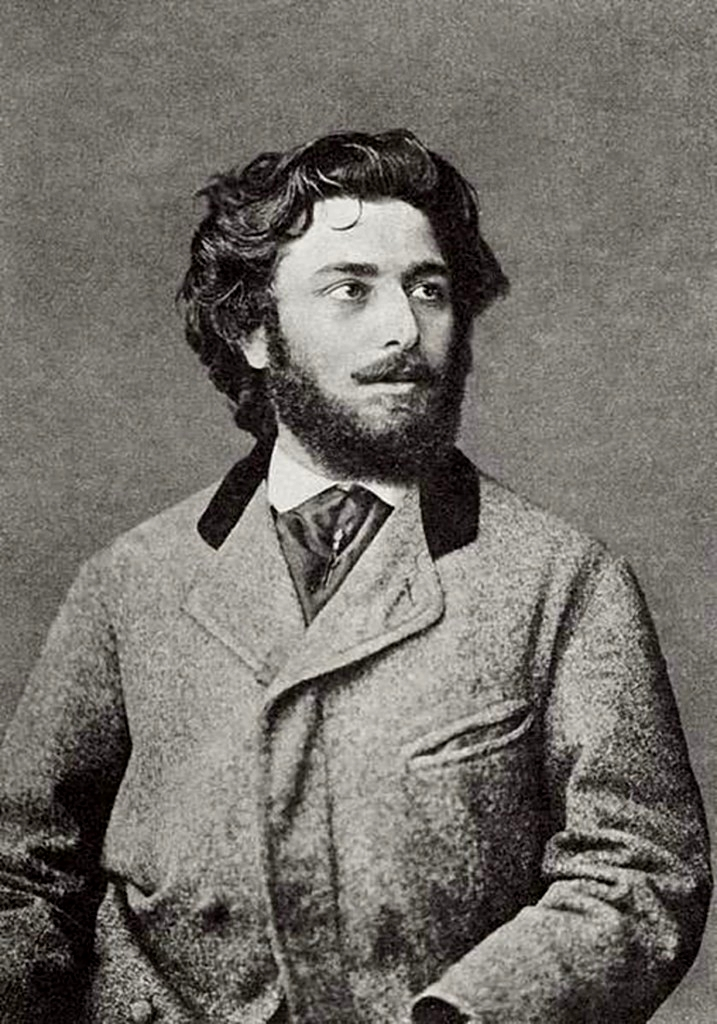
Portrait of Kuindzhi, 1870s

Kuindzhi was born in Mariupol uezd, Yekaterinoslav Governorate, Russian Empire (part of present-day Ukraine), but spent his youth in the city of Taganrog. His Christian name is a Russian rendering of the Greek Archippos, (Note: Greek: Άρχιππος, from Ancient Greek ἄρχος (archos) 'master' and ἱππος (hippos) 'horse', i.e. 'master of horses'; cf. Colossians 4:17, Philemon 1:2.) and his surname came from his grandfather's vocational nickname meaning 'goldsmith' in Crimean Tatar (Urum) (Crimean Tatar: quyumcı). He grew up in a poor family; his father was a Pontic Greek shoemaker, Ivan Khristoforovich Kuindzhi (elsewhere Emendzhi). Arkhip was six years old when he lost his parents, so he was forced to make a living working at a church building site, grazing domestic animals, and working at a corn merchant's shop. He received the rudiments of an education from a Greek friend of the family, who was a teacher, and then went to the local school. He became fluent in Crimean Tatar, Greek, Russian, and Ukrainian.

In 1855, at age 13–14, Kuindzhi visited Feodosia to study art under Ivan Aivazovsky; however, he was engaged merely with mixing paints, and instead studied with Adolf Fessler, Aivazovsky's student. According to the Russian Biographical Dictionary: "Although Kuindzhi cannot be called a student of Aivazovsky, the latter had without doubt some influence on him in the first period of his activity; he borrowed much from him in his manner of painting". English art historian John E. Bowlt wrote that "the elemental sense of light and form associated with Aivazovsky's sunsets, storms, and surging oceans permanently influenced the young Kuindzhi."

From 1860 to 1865, Kuindzhi worked as a retoucher in the photography studio of Simeon Isakovich in Taganrog. He tried to open his own photography studio, but was unsuccessful. After that, Kuindzhi left Taganrog for Saint Petersburg. He studied painting mainly independently and at the St. Petersburg Academy of Arts (from 1868; a full member since 1893). He was co-partner of travelling art exhibitions, known as the Peredvizhniki, a group of realist artists in Russia who, in protest to academic restrictions, formed an artists' cooperative which evolved into the Society for Traveling Art Exhibitions in 1870.

In 1872, Kuindzhi left the academy and worked as a freelancer. His painting On the Valaam Island was the first artwork acquired by Pavel Tretyakov for his art gallery. In 1873, Kuindzhi exhibited his painting The Snow which received the bronze medal at the International Art Exhibition in London in 1874. In the middle of the 1870s, he created a number of paintings in which the landscape motif was designed for concrete social associations in the spirit of the Peredvizhniki (Forgotten Village, 1874; Chumaks Path in Mariupol, 1875; both in the Tretyakov Gallery).

In his mature period, Kuindzhi aspired to capture the most expressive play of light in nature. He applied composite techniques, such as high horizons, to create panoramic views. By employing light effects and vivid tonal colors, he created the illusion of illumination (Evening in Ukraine, 1876; A Birch Grove, 1879; After a Thunderstorm, 1879; all three are in the Tretyakov Gallery; Moonlit Night on the Dnieper, 1880 in the Russian Museum, St. Petersburg). His later works are remarkable for their decorative effects and the building of color.

Kuindzhi also developed a close friendship with the chemist Dmitri Mendeleev, who taught at Saint Petersburg University. Kuindzhi attended his classes as an auditor or student. Kuindzhi frequently visited Mendeleev and his wife's weekly gatherings, developing a life-long interest in the study of light, color, and perception.

Kuindzhi lectured at the St. Petersburg Academy of Arts (professor since 1892; professor-head of landscape workshop since 1894; fired in 1897 for supporting students' protests). Among his students were artists such as Arkady Rylov, Nicholas Roerich, Konstantin Bogaevsky, and others. Kuindzhi initiated the creation of the Society of Artists in 1909; it was later named after him.

== Theft of works ==
In January 2019, his work Ai-Petri. Crimea was stolen from Moscow's Tretyakov Gallery, but was found and safely recovered the next day. The man who stole the painting was sentenced to three years in prison.

On 21 March 2022, during the Russian invasion of Ukraine, the Kuindzhi Art Museum was damaged in a Russian airstrike during the siege of Mariupol. Although three original paintings by Kuindzhi that had been held in the collection—a sketch for Red Sunset, and two preparatory works, Elbrus and Autumn—had been placen in the museum's basement prior to the bombing and were not damaged, they were then taken by Russia as part of its looting campaign.

== Gallery ==
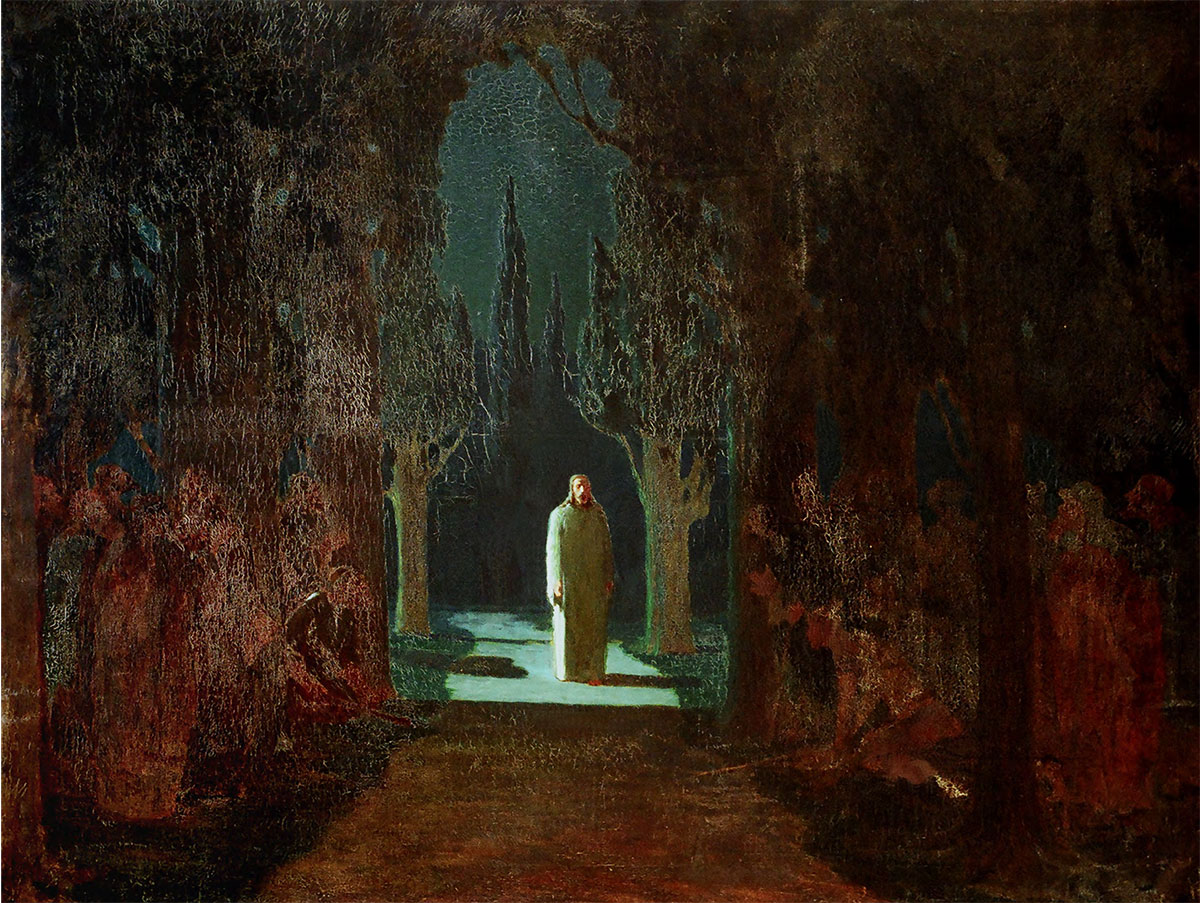
Christ in the Garden of Gethsemane (1901)

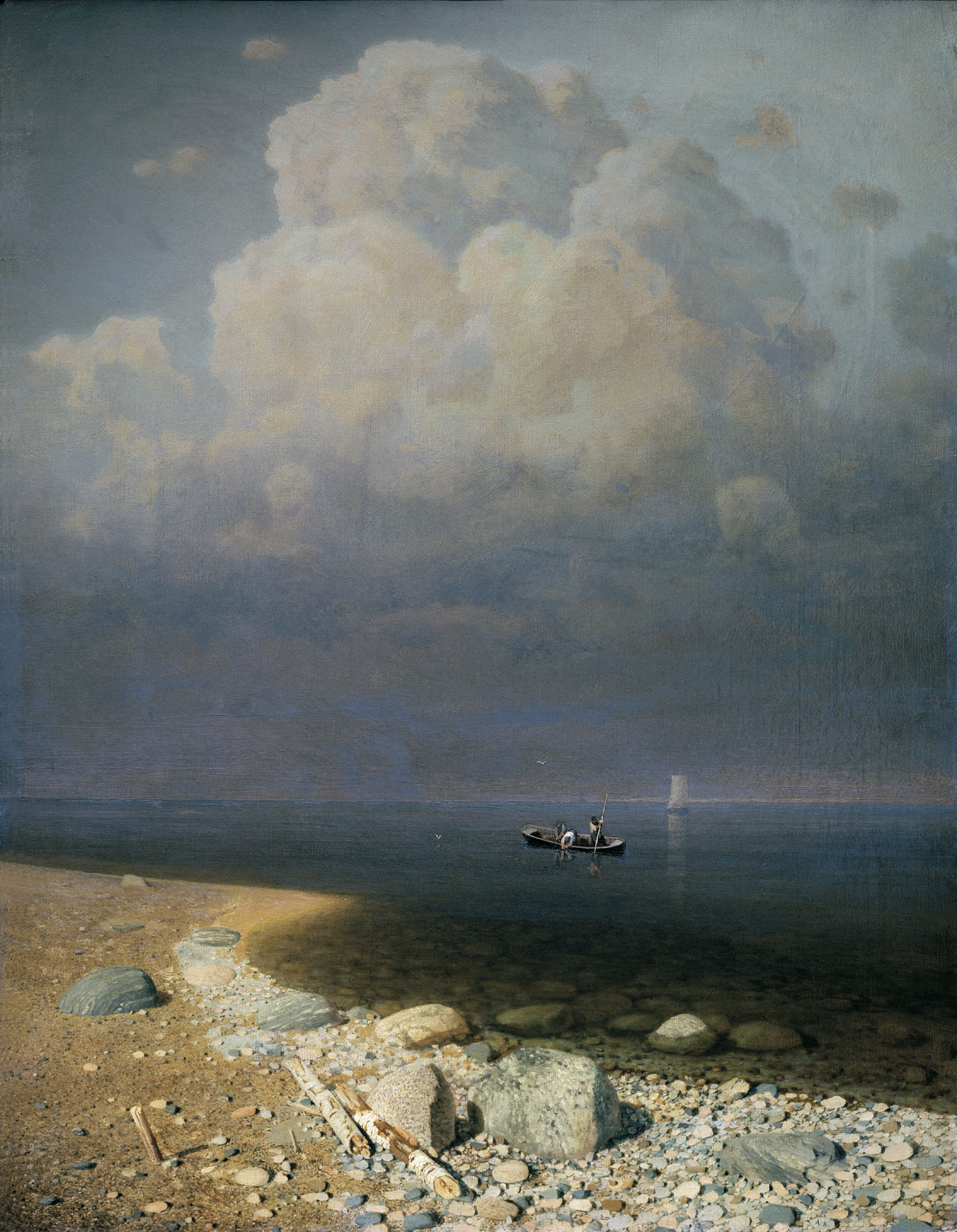
Lake Ladoga (1873)

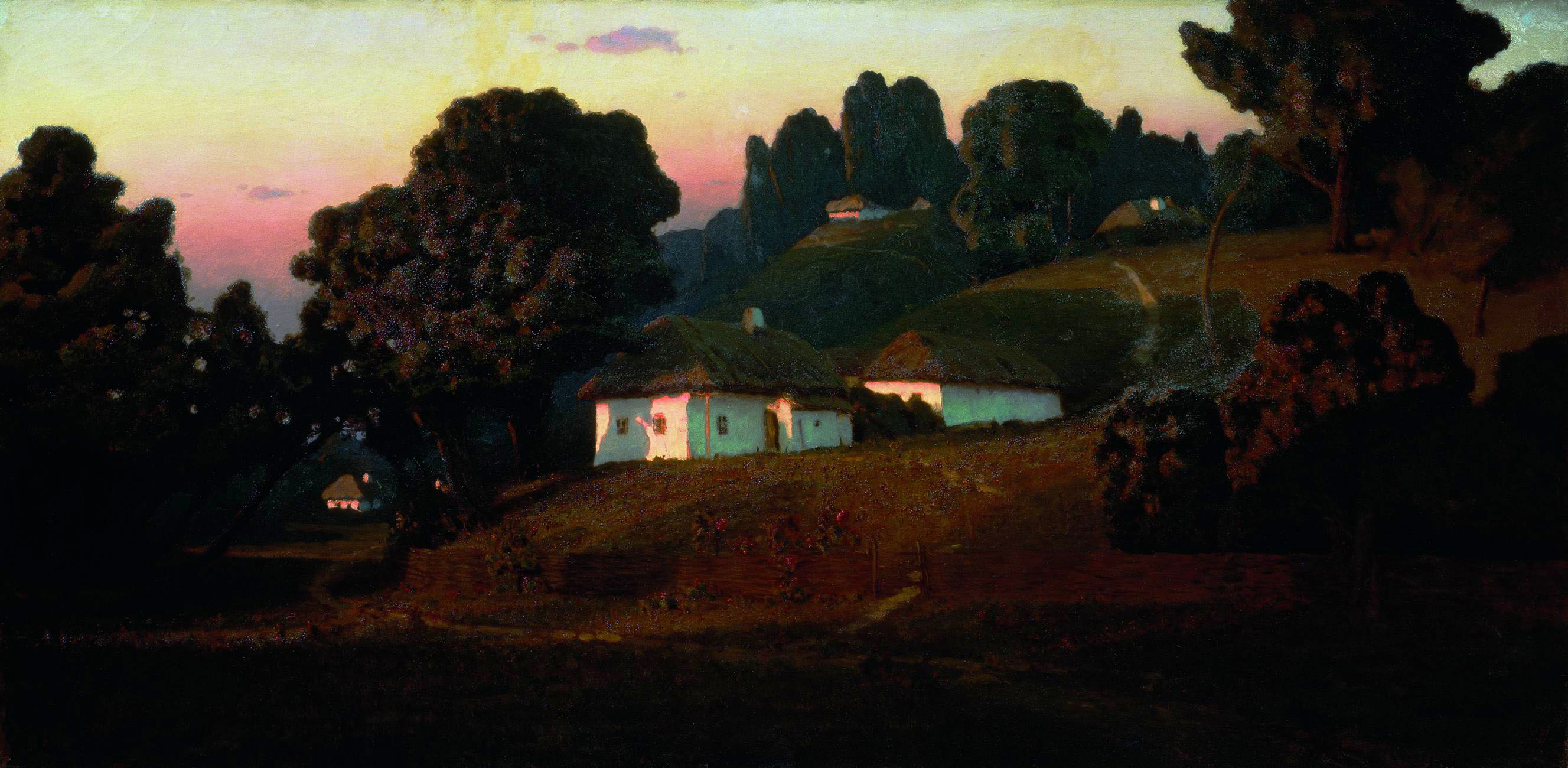
Evening in Ukraine (1878–1901)

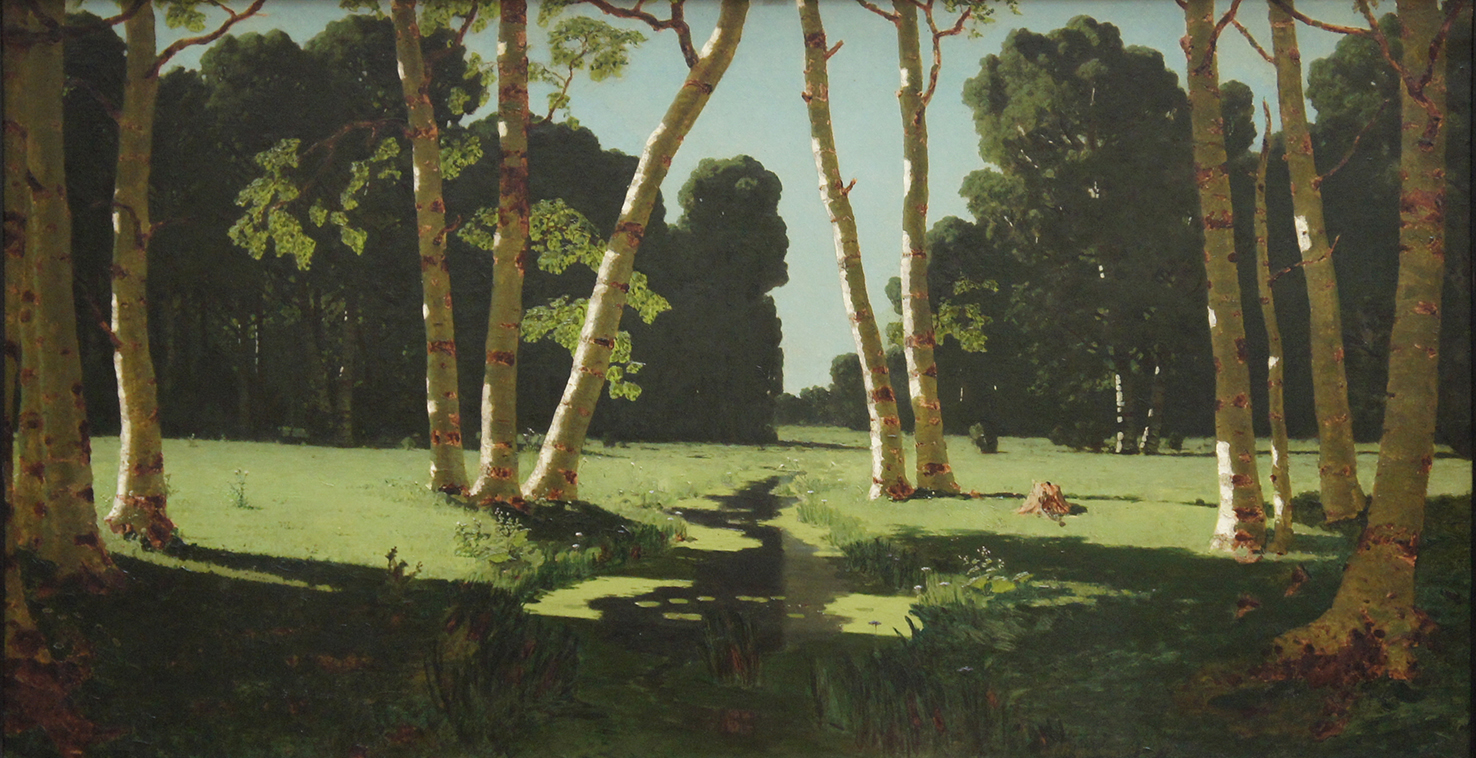
A Birch Grove (1879)

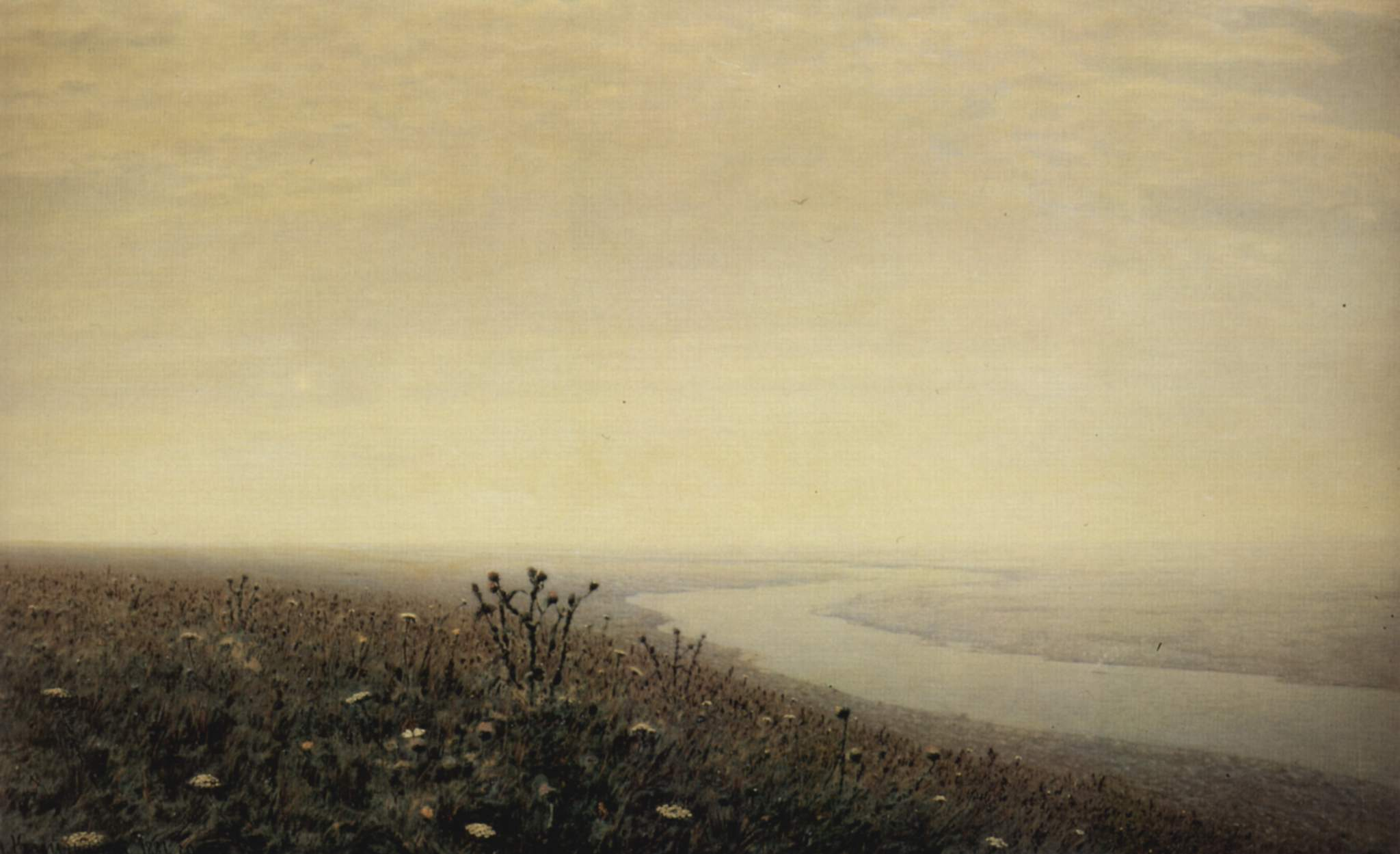
Dnieper in the Morning (1881)

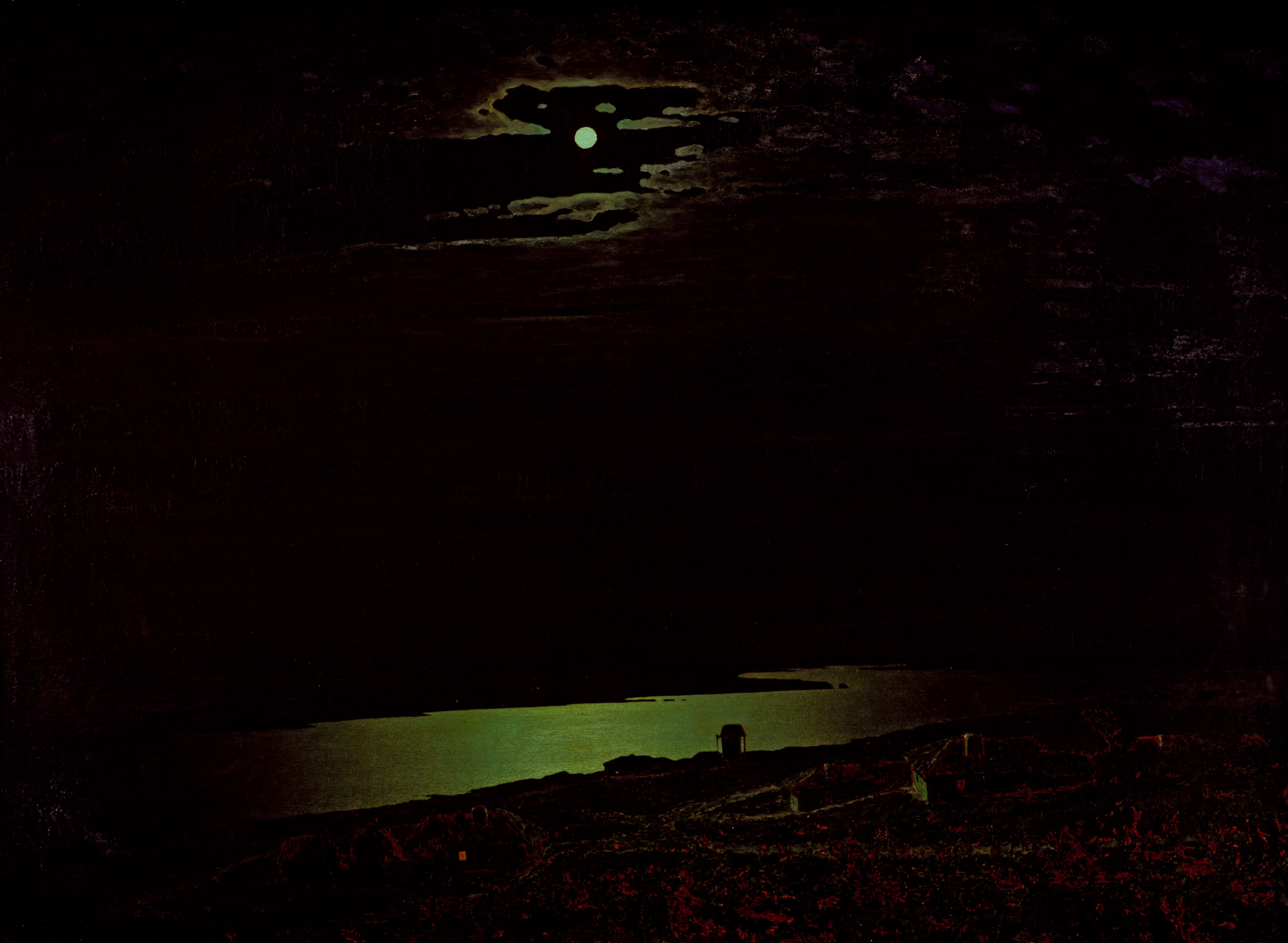
Moonlit Night on the Dnieper (1880)

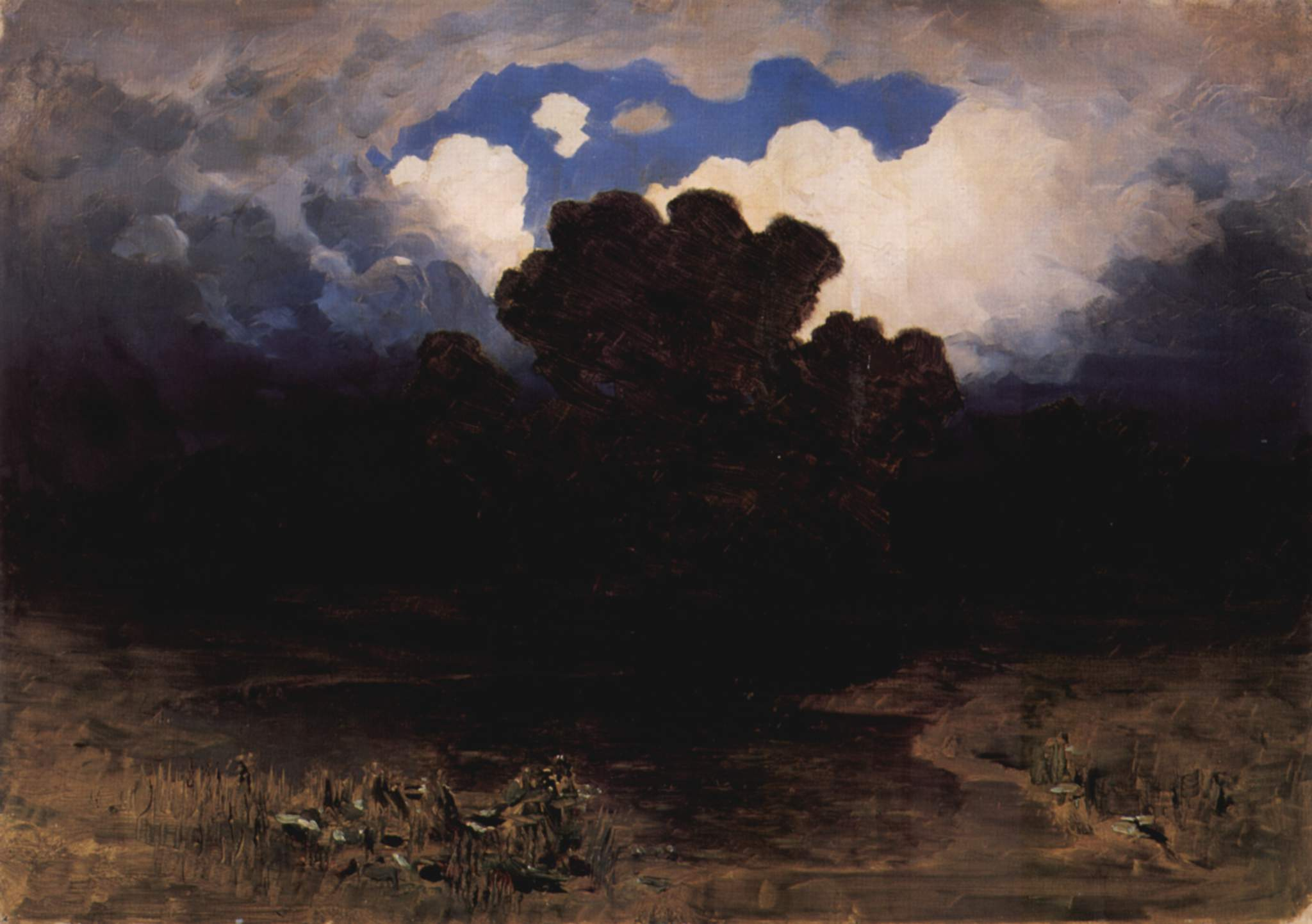
Surf and Clouds (1882)

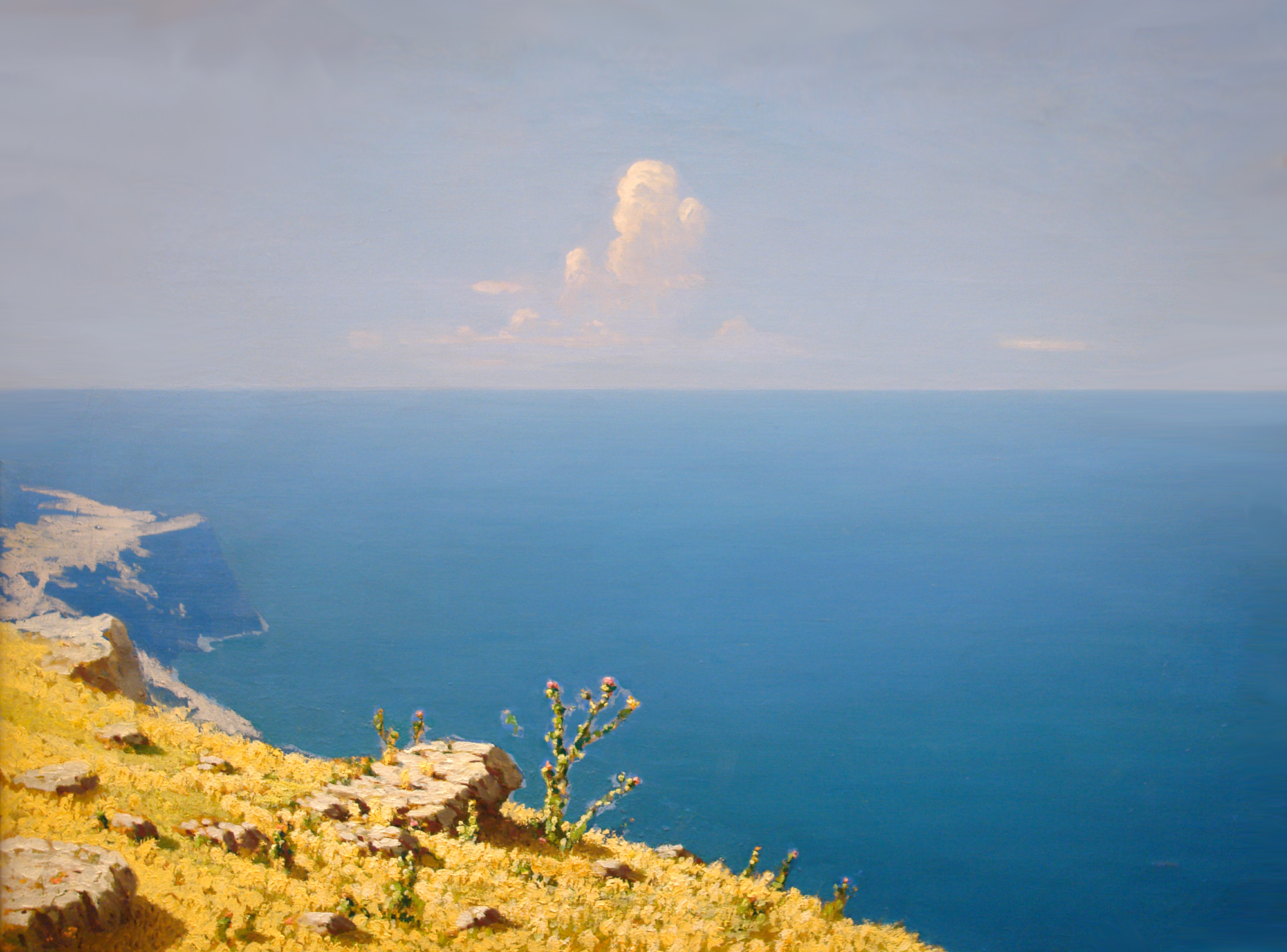
Sea. Crimea (1898–1908)

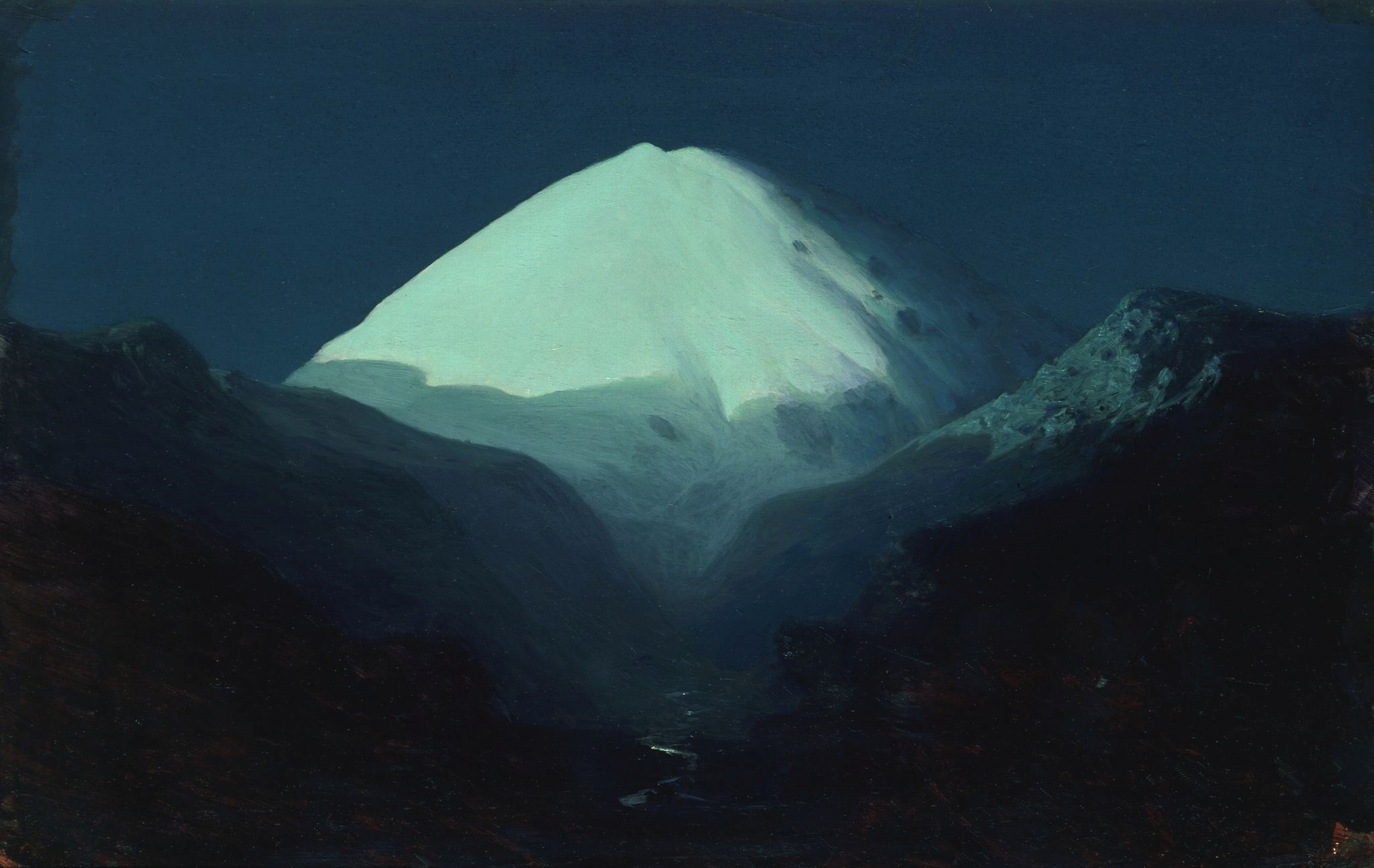
Elbrus (1890–1895)

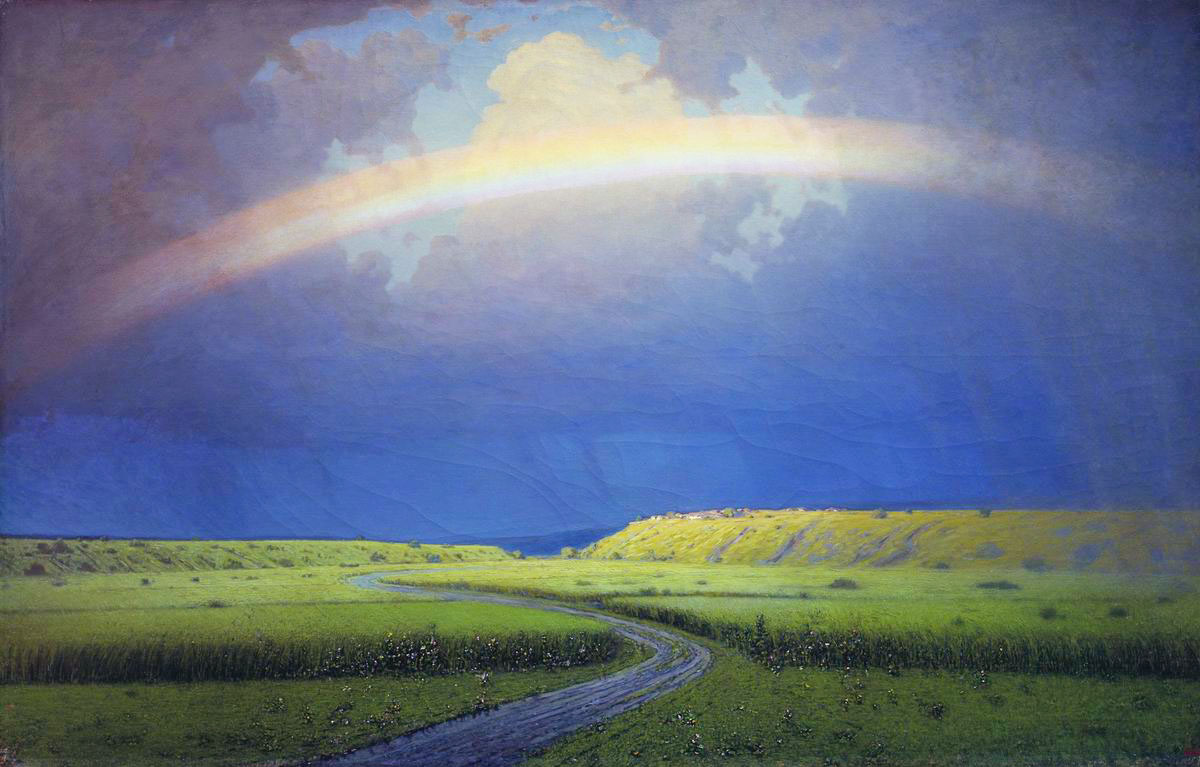
Rainbow (1900–1905)

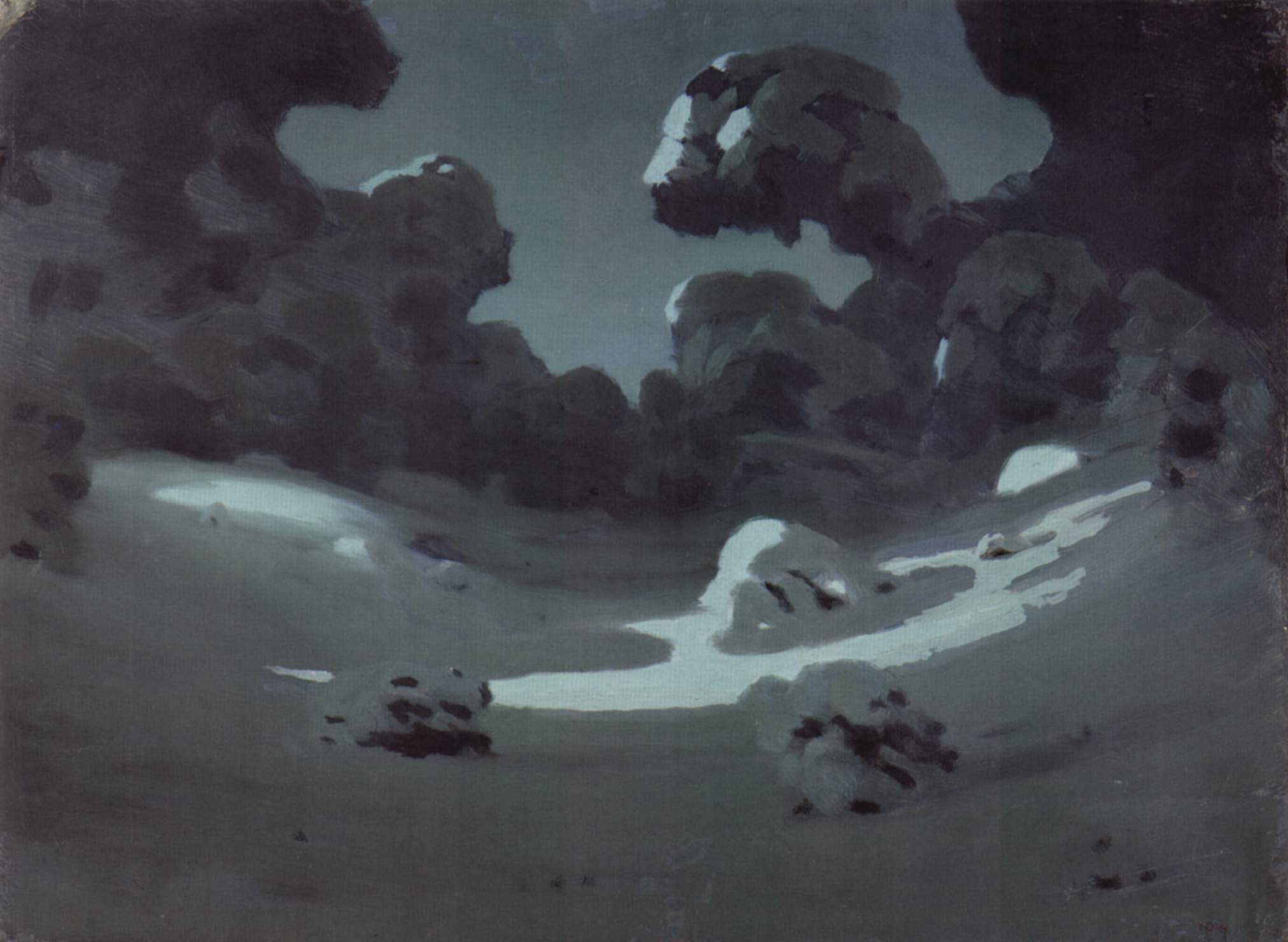
Moonspots in the Forest, Winter (1898–1908)

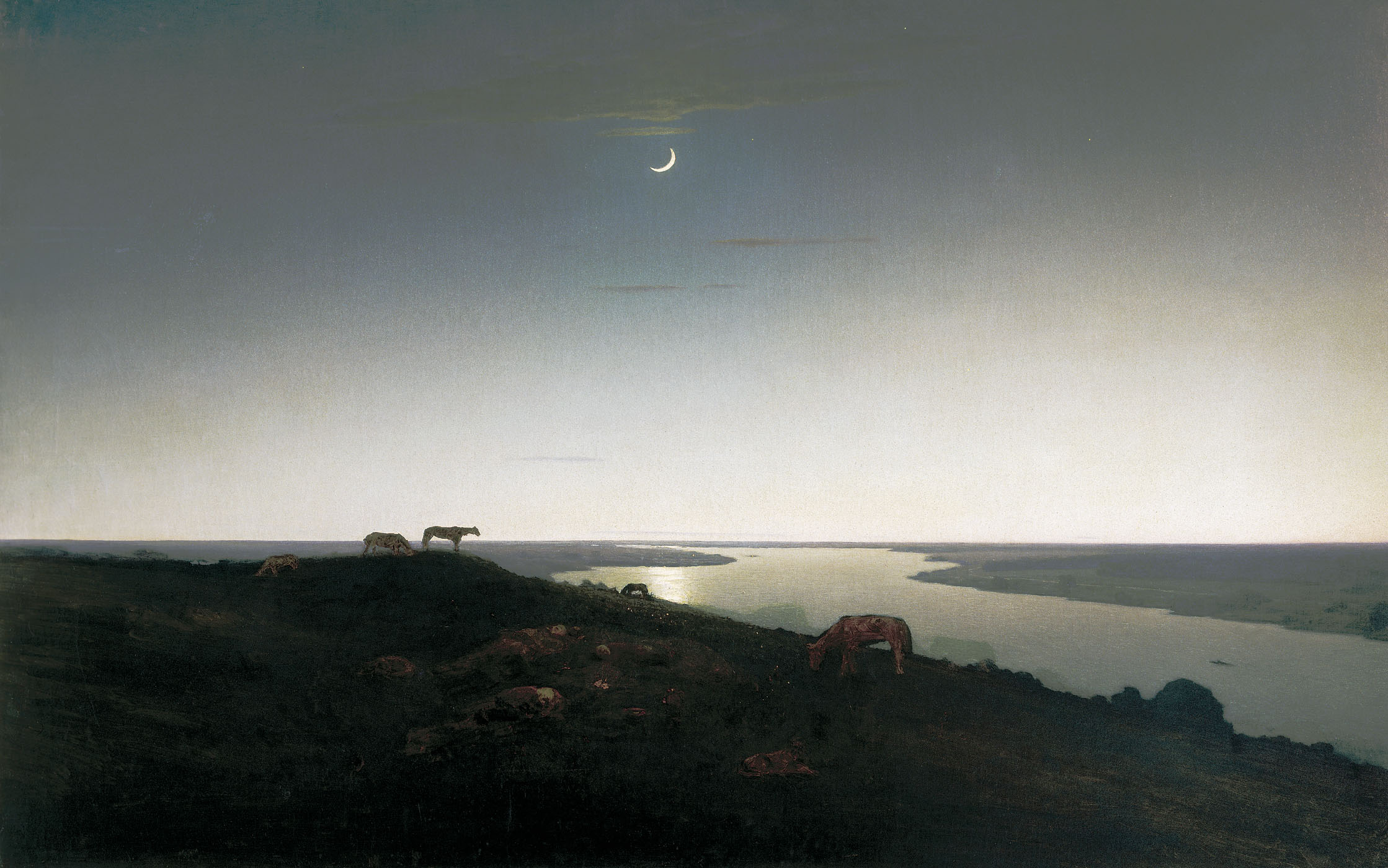
Night (1905–1908)

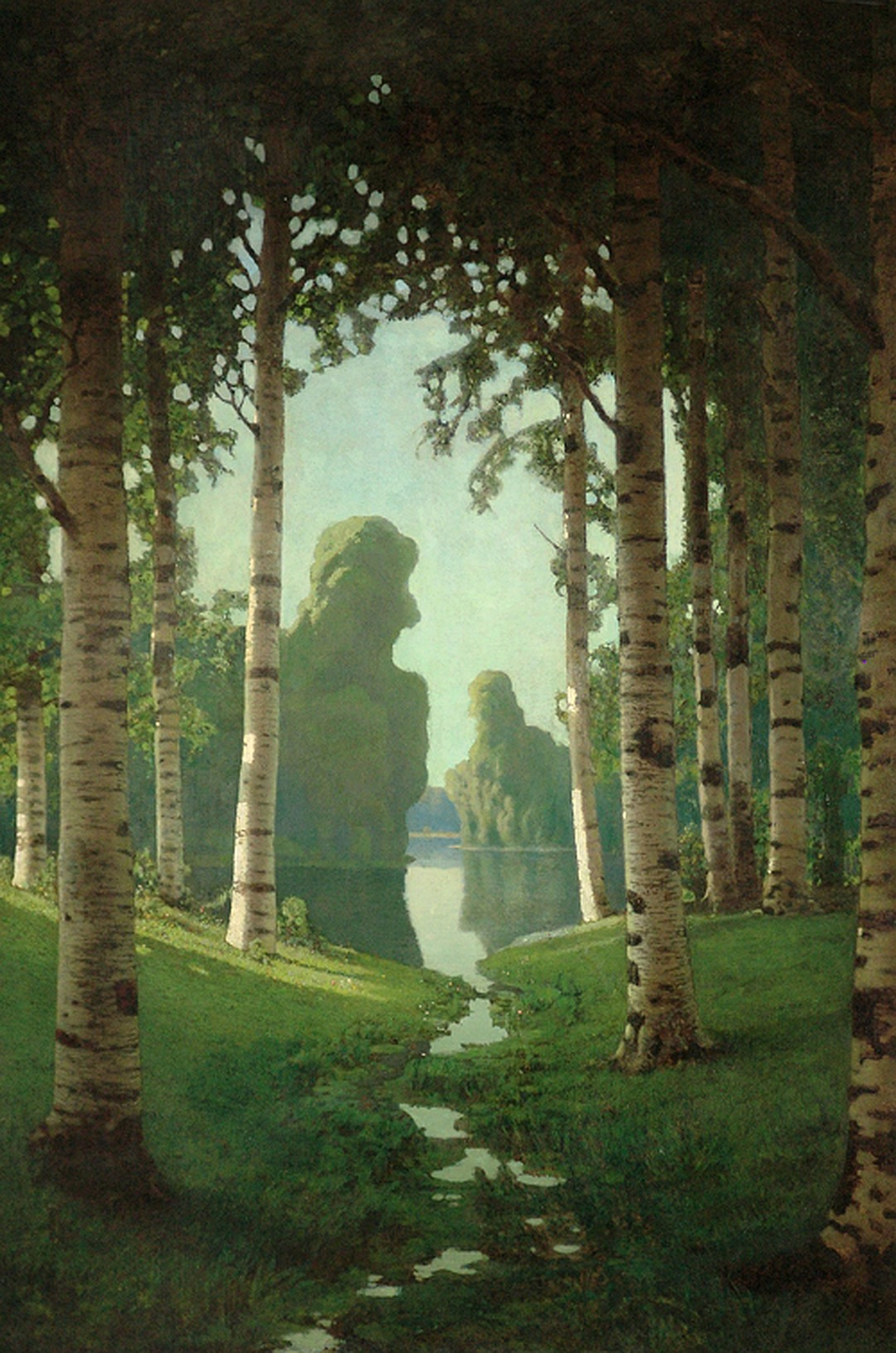
Birch Grove (1901)

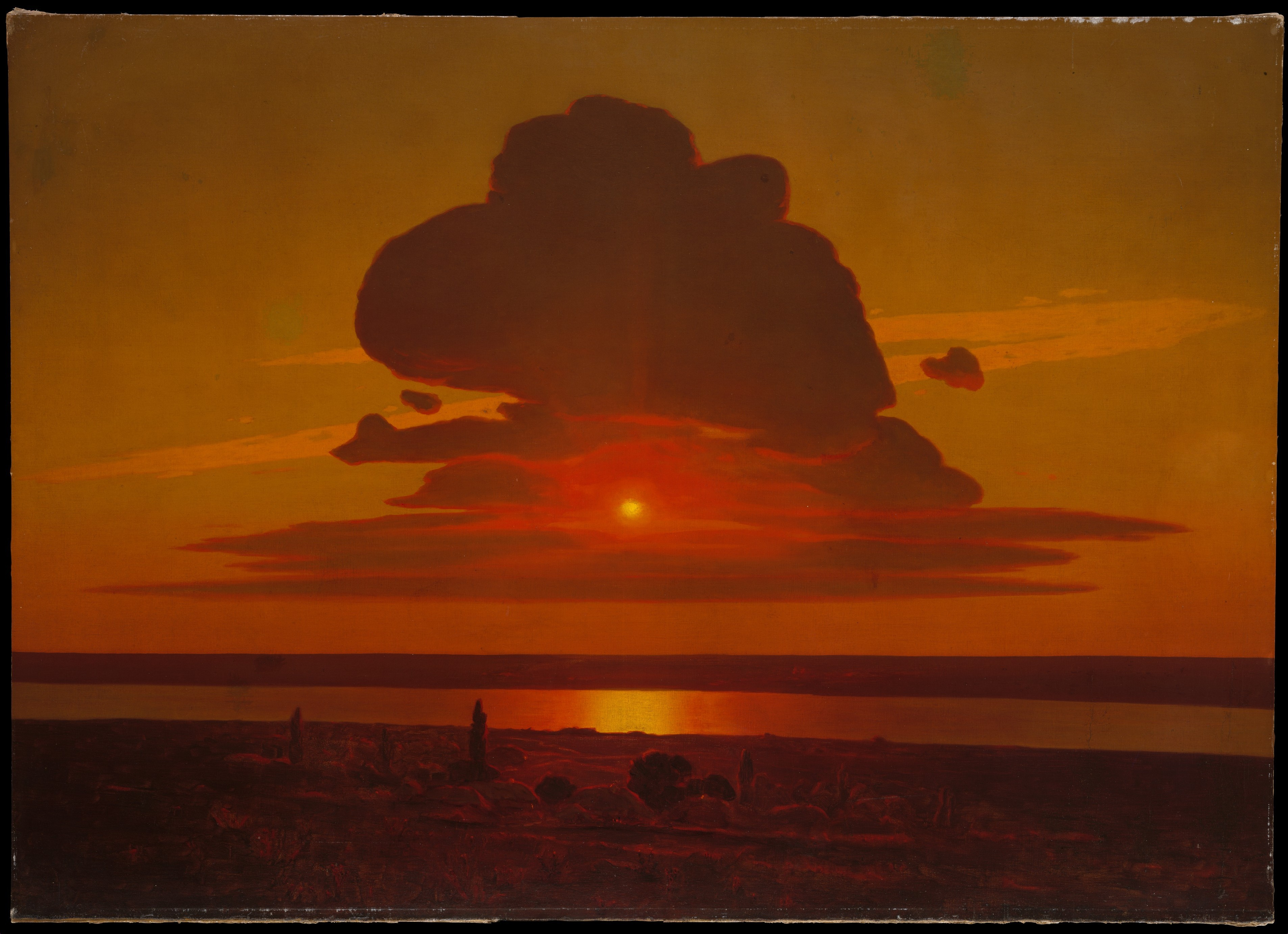
Red Sunset on the Dnieper (1905)

Chumaks Path in Mariupol (1875)

== See also ==
- List of Russian artists

== Sources ==
- "Куинджи, Архип Иванович" . Brockhaus and Efron Encyclopedic Dictionary (in Russian). 1906.
- Manin, V. S. Arkhip Ivanovich Kuinji, Leningrad, 1990, ISBN 5-7370-0098-2
