= Evening in Ukraine =

1878 painting by Arkhip Kuindzhi

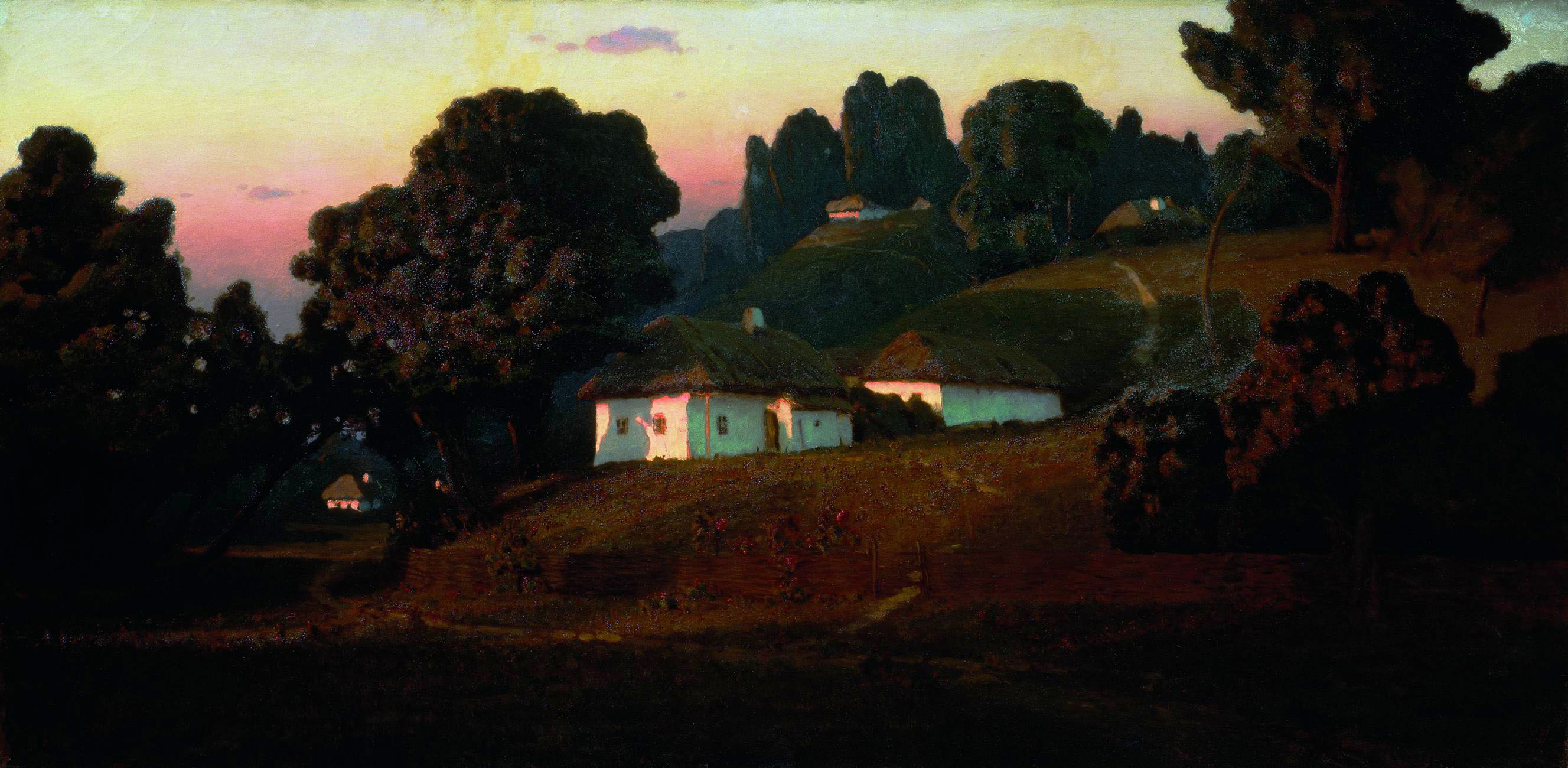
- Artist: Arkhip Kuindzhi
- Year: 1878
- Catalogue: Ж-4190
- Movement: Luminism
- Dimensions: 81 cm × 163 cm (32 in × 64 in)
- Location: Russian Museum, Saint Petersburg; 59°56′19″N 30°19′56″E

Evening in Ukraine is a painting by artist Arkhip Kuindzhi, painted in 1878 (and partially revised in 1901). The painting is part of the collection of the Russian Museum, in Saint Petersburg (inv. Zh-4190).

== History ==
The painting Evening in the Ukraine (under the title Evening) was first shown in 1878 at the 6th exhibition of the Association of Traveling Art Exhibitions (Peredvizhniki), along with another painting by the artist - Forest.

The painting depicts a farmhouse illuminated by a southern sunset. The composition of the painting is reminiscent of Kuindzhi's earlier painting Ukrainian Night (1876), except that the mazanka houses are illuminated not by the moon but by the rays of the setting sun, which is emphasized by the use of shades of bright crimson. As in other paintings of this period, the main strength of this work is Kuindzhi's attempt to understand the secrets of illumination, the play of light and shadow.

== Reviews ==
Art historian Vladimir Petrov wrote in his article dedicated to the 150th anniversary of the birth of Arkhip Kuindzhi:

Alien to "playfulness", he thickens and generalizes tones, intensifies the "luminosity" of his works, using coloristic and technological innovations in the name of "connecting" the viewer to the real life of light. Such aspirations of Kuindzhi were very clearly embodied in the painting Evening in the Ukraine (1878, partially rewritten in 1901, GRM), in which the artist depicted white huts and cherry orchards on the slope of a picturesque hill brightly illuminated by the crimson light of sunset.

In an article on the work of Arkhip Kuindzhi, art historian Vitaly Manin noted:

Evening in the Ukraine is almost the most indicative of Kuindzhi's creative method. Color gives the image an enchanted immobility, extraordinary peace - as if unearthly. Kuindzhi's decorativism manifested itself here nakedly. To accentuate the effect of bright illumination and exhausted freezing of the airy atmosphere, the artist discarded detailing, which in the method of Shishkin, the opposite of Kuindzhi's method, would have been the key to revealing the essence of the theme. The clumps of trees are generalized into heavy masses. The color is so condensed that it appears to be a darkish draughty mass.

== See also ==
- Ukrainian Night (1876)
