= List of Ukrainian painters =

This is an alphabetical listing of Ukrainian painters.

== A ==
Portrait	Name	Year of birth	Year of death	Painting	Title
	Fedir Aaronsky	1742	1825		
	Ivan Aivazovsky	1817	1900		Wedding in Ukraine, 1892
	Alexander Aksinin	1949	1985		Boschiana
	Aljoscha	1974			
	Nathan Altman	1898	1970		The Woman at the Piano, 1914
	Emma Andijewska	1931			
	Mykhailo Andriienko-Nechytailo	1894	1982		
	Kateryna Antonovych	1884	1975		
	Alexander Archipenko	1887	1964		Woman Before a Mirror, 1916

== B ==
Portrait	Name	Year of birth	Year of death	Painting	Title
	Vladimir Baranov-Rossiné	1888	1944		
	Vilen Barskyi	1930	2012		Elements of a Fase,1970
	Nikolai Bartossik	1951	2023		
	Marie Bashkirtseff	1858	1884		At a book, 1882
	Mykhaylo Berkos	1861	1919		Street in Uman, 1895
	Roman Bezpalkiv	1938	2009		
	Dmytro Bezperchy	1825	1913		The Bandurist, 1860
	Nadija Bilokin	1894	1981		
	Kateryna Bilokur	1900	1961		Flowers behind the fence, 1935
	Seraphima Blonskaya	1870	1947		Girls. Palm Sunday, 1900
	Vladimir Bobri	1898	1986		Illustration from The American Magazine printing of Too Many Cooks, 1938
	Nikolai Bodarevsky	1850	1924		Girl from Little Russia, 1892
	Konstantin Bogaevsky	1872	1969		Port of an Imaginable City, 1932
	Alexander Bogomazov	1880	1930		Cosmos, 1910
	Mykhaylo Bokotey	1976			Chinese spring, 2017
	Vladimir Borovikovsky	1757	1825		The Mother of God with the Christ Child. Icon from t Mogilev, 1793-1794
	Mykhailo Boychuk	1882	1937		Girl, 1915
	Tymofiy Boychuk	1896	1922		Women at the Apple Tree
	Osip Braz	1873	1936		Still-life with Vegetables and Fish, 1936
	Isaak Brodsky	1884	1939		Ilya Repin, 1912
	Mykhailo Bryansky	1830	1908		Portrait of Yelizaveta Daragan, 1860
	Ivan Bugaevskiy-Blagodarniy	1773	1860		Portrait of Vladimir Borovikovsky, 1824
	Mykola Burachek	1871	1942		The Wide Dniepr Roars and Moans, 1941
	David Burliuk	1882	1967		Cossack Mamay, 1908
	Vladimir Burliuk	1886	1917		Dancer, 1910
	Borys Buryak	1953			
	Ivan Buriachok	1877	1936		Design for the stage set of the play The Stone Host by Lesya Ukrainka, 1914
	Yulian Butsmaniuk	1885	1967		Bohdan Khmelnytsky, Ivan Vyshenskyi, Ivan Mazepa, Halshka Hulevychivna and other prominent Orthodox figures of Ukraine

== C ==
Portrait	Name	Year of birth	Year of death	Painting	Title
	Cassandre	1901	1968		
	Illya Chychkan	1967			Psychodarvinism, 2017
	Evgeniy Chuikov	1924	2000		Autumn Peace
	Petro Cholodny	1904	1990		
	Mykhaylo Chornyi	1933	2020		Ustym Karmalyuk, 1989
	Pylyp Chyrko	1859	1928		Cavalry Battle in Polotsk, 1890

== D ==
Portrait	Name	Year of birth	Year of death	Painting	Title
	Andriy Danylevsky	1847	?		Portrait of the Maria Raevska-Ivanova, 1895
	Sonia Delaunay	1885	1979		Electric prisms, 1914
	Olga Della-Vos-Kardovskaya	1875	1952		Little Woman, 1910
	Mykhailo Derehus	1904	1997		
	Victor Deysun	1962			
	Vasyl Diadyniuk	1900	1944		
	Mychajlo Dmytrenko	1908	1997		
	Grigoriy Dovzhenko	1899	1980		
	Dmytro Dunaievskyi	1905	1944		

== E ==
Portrait	Name	Year of birth	Year of death	Painting	Title
	Aleksandra Ekster	1882	1949		Three Female Figures, 1910

== F ==
Portrait	Name	Year of birth	Year of death	Painting	Title
	Igor Filippov	1961			
	Borys Fedorenko	1946	2012		The sun is in every picture, 1986
	Zenovii Flinta	1935	1988		
	Yitzhak Frenkel Frenel	1899	1981		

== G ==
Portrait	Name	Year of birth	Year of death	Painting	Title
	Eugene Garin	1922	1994		
	Nina Genke-Meller	1893	1954		Suprematist Composition, 1915
	Nikolai Getman	1917	2004		
	Boris Ginsburg	1933	1963		“I am punished, I suffer… but I do not repent!…”, (Taras Shevchenko)
	Olena Golub	1951			
	Yefim Golyshev	1897	1970		
	John D. Graham	1887	1961		Mysteria 2, 1924
	Alexis Gritchenko	1883	1977		
	Igor Gubskiy	1954	2022		Saddled with Power, 2014
	Alexandr Guristyuk	1959			
	Olga Gurski	1902	1975		

== H ==
Portrait	Name	Year of birth	Year of death	Painting	Title
	Olha Haidamaka	1900			
	Volodymyr Harbuz	1951			
	Mykhailo Havrylko	1882	1920		
	Mykola Hlushchenko	1901	1977		
	Rostyslav Hluvko	1927	1990		
	Jacques Hnizdovsky	1915	1985		Annunciation, 1982
	Oleksandr Hnylytskyi	1961	2009		
	Oleg Holosiy	1965	1993		
	Sviatoslav Hordynskyi	1906	1993		
	Alla Horska	1929	1970		Boryviter
	Olesya Hudyma	1980			
	Vasile Hutopilă	1953			
	Liuboslav Hutsaliuk	1923	2003		

== I ==
Portrait	Name	Year of birth	Year of death	Painting	Title
	Oleksandr Ivakhnenko	1931	2003		The declaration about state sovereignty of the Ukraine, 1991
	Mykola Ivasyuk	1865	1937		The Kiss, 1900

== K ==
Portrait	Name	Year of birth	Year of death	Painting	Title
	Tymofiy Kalynsky	1740s	after 1808		Scribe, late 1760s
	Hryhorii Kapustyn	1867	1925		Smugglers on the Crimean Coast, 1925
	Mariia Karpiuk	1900	1978		
	Vasyl Kasiian	1896	1976		
	Vlodko Kaufman	1957			
	Pavlo Kerestey	1962			
	Nil Khasevych	1905	1952		Laundry, 1920s
	Mykhaylo Khmelko	1919	1996		
	Petro Kholodnyi	1875	1930		
	Alexander Khvostenko-Khvostov	1895	1967		
	Yuriy Khymych	1928	2003		The Indestructible Sophia, 1965.
	Ivan Khvorostetskyi	1888	1958		
	Michael Kmit	1910	1981		
	Yury Kokh	1958			Square, 1990s
	Valentyn Kolosov	1928	2004		Didukh, before 1997
	Eugène Konopatzky	1886	1962		
	Teofil Kopystynskyi	1844	1916		Petro Konashevych-Sahaidachny, 1886
	Michel Korochansky	1866	1925		Fishing harbour, 1925
	Jaroslava Korol	1954	2009		Kobzar, 2007
	Kyriak Kostandi	1852	1921		Blooming lilac, 1902
	Alexander Kostetsky	1954	2010		
	Andriy Kotska	1911	1987		
	Edward Kozak	1902	1992		
	Mykhailo Kozyk	1879	1947		Young Girl with a Lantern, 1947
	Boris Kriukow	1895	1967		
	Mariia Krompets-Morachevska	1897	1960		
	Fedir Krychevsky	1879	1947		Self portrait, 1923-24
	Vasyl Krychevsky	1873	1952		A Crimean Tatar house in Alushta, 1923
	Anatoliy Kryvolap	1946			
	Hanna Kryvolap	1977			
	Viktor Kryzhanovskyi	1950	2016		
	Konstantin Kryzhitsky	1858	1911		Evening in Ukraine, 1901
	Arkhip Kuindzhi	1841	1910		Red Sunset on the Dnipro, 1905
	Olena Kulchytska	1877	1967		Portrait of Sister Olha, 1919
	Beata Kurkul	1979			
	Osyp Kurylas	1870	1951		Wife's portrait, 1907
	Andrei Kushnir	1947			Sheep in the west meadow
	Nikolai Kuznetsov	1850	1929		On Holiday, 1879—1881
	Solomon Kyshynivskyj	1862	1942		Elders' Council

== L ==
Portrait	Name	Year of birth	Year of death	Painting	Title
	Arnold Lakhovsky	1880	1937		Self portrait, 1910
	Velerii Lamakh	1925	1978		
	Kost Lavro	1961			A Ukrainian courtyard, 2011
	Andronyk Lazarchuk	1870	1934		Reading the letter, 1888
	Vadim Lazarkevich	1895	1963		
	Mykola Lebid	1936	2007		
	Felix Lembersky	1913	1970		Execution: Babi Yar, ca. 1944-52
	Sonia Lewitska	1874	1937		L'Amour
	Dmitry Levitzky	1735	1822		Jacob Johann Sievers, 1779
	El Lissitzky	1890	1941		
	Robert Lisovskyi	1893	1982		Ukrainian scouting organization Plast
	Alexander Litovchenko	1835	1890		Charon Carrying Souls Across the River Styx, 1861
	Vasyl Lopata	1941	2025		1 Hryvnia banknote, 1996
	Anton Losenko	1737	1773		Abel, 1768
	Oleh Loshniv	1887	1934		
	Louis Lozowick	1892	1973		Roof and Sky, 1939
	Volodymyr Lukan	1961	2025		Home iconostasis
	Sergey Lunov	1909	1978		
	Yevhen Lysyk	1930	1991		

== M ==
Portrait	Name	Year of birth	Year of death	Painting	Title
	Pavlo Makov	1958			
	Yuri Makoveychuk	1961			
	Kazimir Malevich	1879	1935		Sensation of Danger or Running Man, 1932
	Mykola Malynka	1913	1993		
	Mykola Malyshko				
	Stepan Mamchich	1924	1974		In Henichesk, 1961
	Fedir Manailo	1910	1978		
	Emmanuel Mané-Katz	1894	1964		
	Antin Manastyrsky	1878	1969		
	Vitold Manastyrsky	1915	1992		
	Ivan Marchuk	1936			Rays of the morning sun, 2005
	Volodymyr Marchuk	1953			
	Anastasiya Markovich	1979			
	Kostyantyn Markovych	1968			
	Viktor Marynyuk	1939	2025		
	Oksana Mas	1969			
	Michael Matusevitch	1929	2007		
	Halyna Mazepa	1910	1995		Fortune Telling - three girls, 1946
	Liubomyr Medvid	1941			
	Vadym Meller	1884	1962		Hello, on the wave 477, 1929
	Leonid Mezheritski	1930	2007		Springtime Sea Surf, 1970s
	Oleg Minko	1938	2013		
	Abraham Mintchine	1898	1931		Pierrot, 1928
	Apollon Mokritsky	1810	1870		Yevhen Hrebinka, 1841
	Mykhailo Moroz	1904	1992		
	Mykola Murashko	1844	1909		A view of the Dnipro, 1890
	Oleksandr Murashko	1875	1919		Laundress, 1914
	Yaroslava Muzyka	1894	1973		

== N ==
Portrait	Name	Year of birth	Year of death	Painting	Title
	Sofiya Nalepinska-Boychuk	1884	1937		Femine in Ukraine
	Heorhiy Narbut	1886	1920		Eneida, till 1920
	Anatoliy Nasedkin	1924	1994		
	Mykola Nedilko	1902	1979		
	Ulyana Nesheva	1983			
	Nikifor	1895	1968		
	Pyotr Nilus	1869	1943		
	Oleksa Novakivskyi	1872	1935		Leda and the Swan
	Jerzy Nowosielski	1923	2011		Town at the Foot of Mountains, 1963
	Ivanna Nyzhnyk-Vynnykiv	1912	1933		

== O ==
Portrait	Name	Year of birth	Year of death	Painting	Title
	Katerina Omelchuk	1982			
	Emiliia Okhrymovych-Holubovska	1903	1994		
	Arcadia Olenska-Petryshyn	1934	1996		
	Yaroslav Omelyan	1929	2025		
	Sarkis Ordyan	1918	2003		
	Volodymyr Orlovsky	1842	1914		Harvest, 1882
	Mykhailo Osinchuk	1890	1969		
	Alexander Osmerkin	1892	1953		Lady, 1910

== P ==
Portrait	Name	Year of birth	Year of death	Painting	Title
	Ivan Padalka	1894	1937		Picking Tomatoes, 1937
	Ihor Paliy	1963			
	Victor Palmov	1888	1929		Ukrainian village in winter (Zelenyi Klyn), 1920
	Lyubov Panchenko	1938	2022		
	Yuliian Pankevych	1863	1933		Ivan Franko, 1910
	Yurii Patsan	1963			
	Volodymyr Patyk	1929	2016		
	Kapiton Pavlov	1791	1852		The Artist's Children, 1830s
	Anatol Petrytsky	1895	1964		Haven, 1930
	Yustyn Pigulyak	1845	1919		Memories of Ukraine, 1910
	Olha Pilyuhina	1982			
	Yulia Pinkusevich	1982			
	Khariton Platonov	1842	1907		Oksana, 1888
	Olha Pleshkan	1898	1985		
	Paraska Plytka-Horytsvit	1927	1998		
	Les Podervyansky	1952			
	Ihor Podolchak	1962			
	Ivan Pokhitonov	1850	1923		The old house in Nikolske, 1915
	Viktor Poltavets	1925	2003		
	Leonid Pozen	1849	1921		
	Maria Prymachenko	1909	1997		Blue bull, 1947
	Yaroslav Pstrak	1878	1916		Mermaid, before 1916
	Sasha Putrya	1977	1989		
	Mykola Pymonenko	1862	1912		Flower Girl, 1908

== R ==
Portrait	Name	Year of birth	Year of death	Painting	Title
	Maria Raevskaia-Ivanova	1840	1912		Self-portrait with a model, 1882
	Polina Raiko	1928	2004		
	Vlada Ralko	1969			
	Kliment Red'ko	1897	1956		
	Ilya Repin	1844	1930		Reply of the Zaporozhian Cossacks to Sultan Mehmed IV, 1850
	Misha Reznikoff	1905	1971		
	Oleksandr Rojtburd	1961	2021		
	Ivan Rutkovych	1650?	1708?		Gabriel the Archangel, 1697–99
	Ada Rybachuk	1931	2010		
	Issachar Ber Ryback	1897	1935		Town, 1917
	Vasiliy Ryabchenko	1954			Undecipherable characters shore, 1989
	Volodymyr Rybotytskyi	1942			

== S ==
Portrait	Name	Year of birth	Year of death	Painting	Title
	Vasiliy Sad	1948			
	Andrii Sahaidakovskyi	1957			
	Christina Saj	1967			
	Yuri Salko	1964			
	Mykola Samokysh	1860	1944		Zaporozhian Cossacks having lunch, 1917
	Arsen Savadov	1962			
	Liudmyla Semykina	1924	2021		
	Oksana Shachko	1987	2018		
	Nina Shupliak	1939			
	Oleg Shupliak	1967			
	Vasily Sedlyar	1899	1937		Portrait of Oksana Pavlenko, 1927 - 1928
	Roman Selskyi	1903	1990		
	Zinaida Serebriakova	1884	1967		The Shoots of Autumn Crops, 1908
	Ivan Severyn	1881	1964		
	Halyna Sevruk	1929	2022		
	Hanna Shabatura	1914	2004		
	Manuil Shechtman	1900	1941		Victims of the Pogrom, 1927
	Taras Shevchenko	1814	1861		Maria, 1840
	Oleksii Shovkunenko	1884	1974		
	Ilya Shtilman	1902	1966		
	Iryna Shukhevych	1885	1979		
	Margit Sielska-Reich	1903	1980		
	Modest Sosenko	1875	1920		Saleswoman of Oranges, 1912
	Nikolai Skadovsky	1845	1892		Homeless, 1870s
	Zoia Skoropadenko	1978			
	Marina Skugareva	1962			
	Opanas Slastion	1855	1933		The riverbank, 1900s
	Hanna Sobachko-Shostak	1883	1965		Birdhouse, 1963
	Anton Solomoukha	1945	2015		
	Osip Sorokhtei	1890	1941		Descent from the Cross, 1936
	Ivan Soshenko	1807	1876		The Grandmother of Mikhail Chaly, Taras Shevchenko's biographer
	Vladimir Sosnovsky	1922	1990		
	Mykola Storozhenko	1928	2015		
	Alexander Stovbur	1943	2019		
	Fedir Stovbynenko	1864	1933		Cossack-bandyrist, 1890
	Rufin Sudkovsky	1850	1885		Clear Water
	Okhrim Sudomora	1889	1968		War of Mushrooms and Beetles, 1919
	Serhiy Svetoslavsky	1857	1931		Flooding of the Dnipro in Obolon, 1890s
	Sergei Sviatchenko	1952			From Better than the Moon
	Stanislav Sychov	1937	2003		
	Victor Sydorenko	1953			

== T ==
Portrait	Name	Year of birth	Year of death	Painting	Title
	Vladimir Tatlin	1885	1953		Female Model, 1913
	Alexander Telalim	1966			
	Oleh Tistol	1960			Roxelana, 1995
	Mykhailo Tkachenko	1860	1916		Family at rest
	Ivan Trush	1869	1941		Sunset
	Konstantin Trutovsky	1826	1893		Caroling, 1864
	Mykola Tseluiko	1937	2007		
	Mikhail Turovsky	1933			
	Roman Turovsky-Savchuk	1961			

== U ==
Portrait	Name	Year of birth	Year of death	Painting	Title
	Kornylo Ustiyanovych	1839	1903		Taras Shevchenko in Exile, 1860
	Stepan Usyk	1925	2001		

== V ==
Portrait	Name	Year of birth	Year of death	Painting	Title
	Matvei Vaisberg	1958			
	Havrylo Vasko	1820	after 1887		Portrait of Petro Konashevych-Sahaidachny, between 1840 and 1860
	Serhii Vasylkivsky	1854	1917		Trinity Cathedral in Samar, 1882
	Roman Vasylyk	1947			
	Zinaida Viktorzhevska	1905	1985		
	Max Vityk	1964			
	Mickola Vorokhta	1947			

== W ==
Portrait	Name	Year of birth	Year of death	Painting	Title
	David Ossipovitch Widhopff	1967	1933		Spring Landscape

== Y ==
Portrait	Name	Year of birth	Year of death	Painting	Title
	Tetiana Yablonska	1917	2005		Flax, 1977
	Nikolai Yaroshenko	1846	1898		The Student Girl, 1883
	Roman Yatsiv	1956			
	Yuriy N. Yegorov	1926	2008		
	Andriy Yermolenko	1974			
	Vasyl Yermylov	1894	1968		Cover of the magazine Avantgarde, 1929
	Ivan Yizhakevych	1864	1962		Ivan Mazepa Tower (Pechersk), 1910s
	Mariia Yunak	1902	1977		

== Z ==
Portrait	Name	Year of birth	Year of death	Painting	Title
	Fyodor Zakharov	1919	1994		Sunny Day in Sedniv, 1968
	Viktor Zaretsky	1925	1990		
	Viktor Zarubin	1866	1928		Cloud shadows, 1907
	Mykhailo Zhuk	1883	1964		
	Oleksandr Zhyvotkov	1964			
	Halyna Zubchenko	1929	2000		Hutsul Wedding, 1959
	Karlo Zvirynsky	1923	1997		

== See also ==
- List of Ukrainian artists
