= Mykhaylo Chornyi =

Ukrainian artist (1933–2020)

Chornyi, Mykhaylo
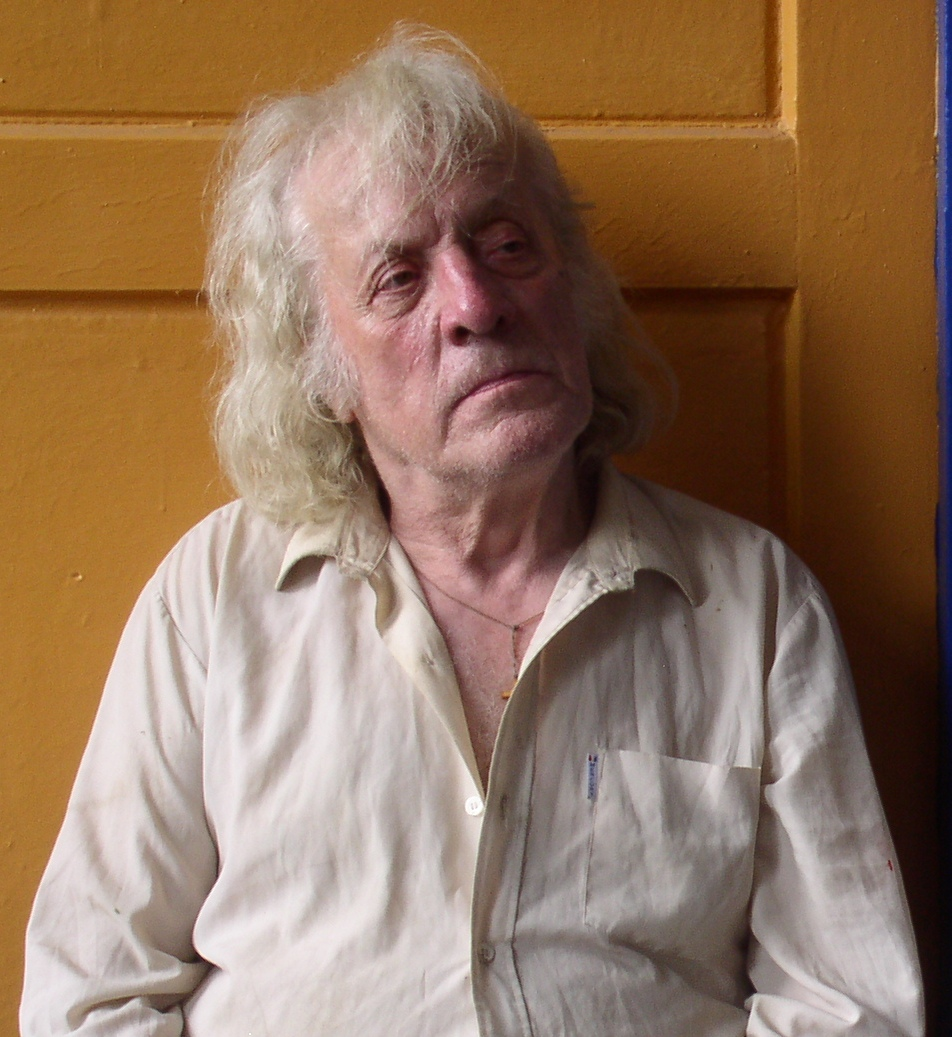
- Born: November 26, 1933; Vinnytsia Oblast) in Ukraine, USSR
- Died: September 24, 2020 (aged 86)
- Known for: Ukrainian painter, graphic artist
- Movement: realism, Neo-Primitivist
- Awards: National Artist of Ukraine (People's Artist of Ukraine)(2003)

Mykhaylo Nikiforovich Chornyi (Ukrainian: Михайло Никифорович Чорний; Russian: Михаил Никифорович Чёрный; November 26, 1933 – September 24, 2020) was a Ukrainian Realist, Neo-Primitivist) painter and graphic artist. Chornyi is described as "the founder of Ukrainian Neo-Folk Style". He was a member of Ukrainian National Artists' Union from 1968, and was awarded the People's Artist of Ukraine (2003).

== Background ==
Mykhaylo Chornyi studied art from 1956 to 1961 at Odessa State Art College n.a. M. Grekov, and same year he entered Kyiv Art Institute (nowadays The National Academy of Fine Arts and Architecture, which graduated with a Master's Degree in Fine Arts in 1968 (professors: Mykhaylo Khmelko and Victor Shatalin.
At the post-graduate school in Soviet Academy of Arts he studied in Sergey Grigoriev's and Mykhaylo Deregus's workshop.

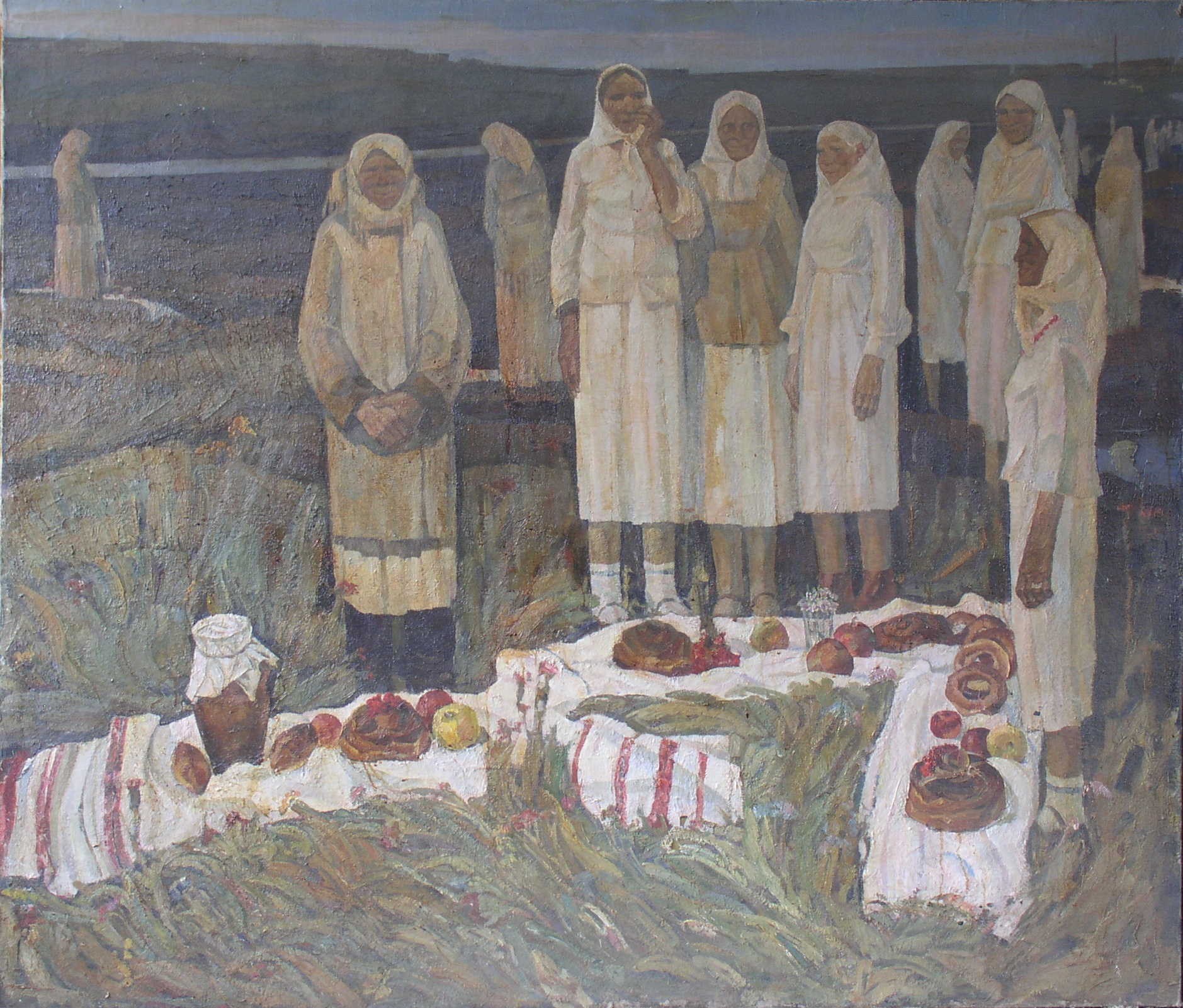
Widdows commemorating their husbands at the battle field. 1985 - oil, canvas. - 150x200 cm.

He transformed the Socialist realism artistic manner he was taught through a Ukrainian academic romanticism and historicism, rare at that time of Soviet censorship and pressure, to a new folk artistic style.

Chornyi died on September 24, 2020, at the age of 86.

== Awards ==
- I Prize at The All-Union Arkhip Kuindzhi Contest (1973)
- I Prize at The Nikolai Trublaini Contest (1976)
- National Artist of Ukraine (People's Artist of Ukraine) (2003)

== Exhibitions ==
Mykhaylo Chornyi has more than 50 personal exhibitions of paintings and graphics all over former Soviet Union and throughout nowadays Ukraine.

== Collections ==
His works are in possession of Soviet Ministry of Culture, Ukrainian Ministry of Culture, leading Ukrainian State museums, in private collections of Australia, Austria, Canada, France, Germany, Greece, Hungary, Israel, Poland, Russia, Slovakia, Spain, USA, as well as Ukraine.
Mykhaylo Chornyi is noted in "The Artists of The World": A Bio-bibliographical Index A to Z. (Munich: K. G. Saur (publisher)), 1996.

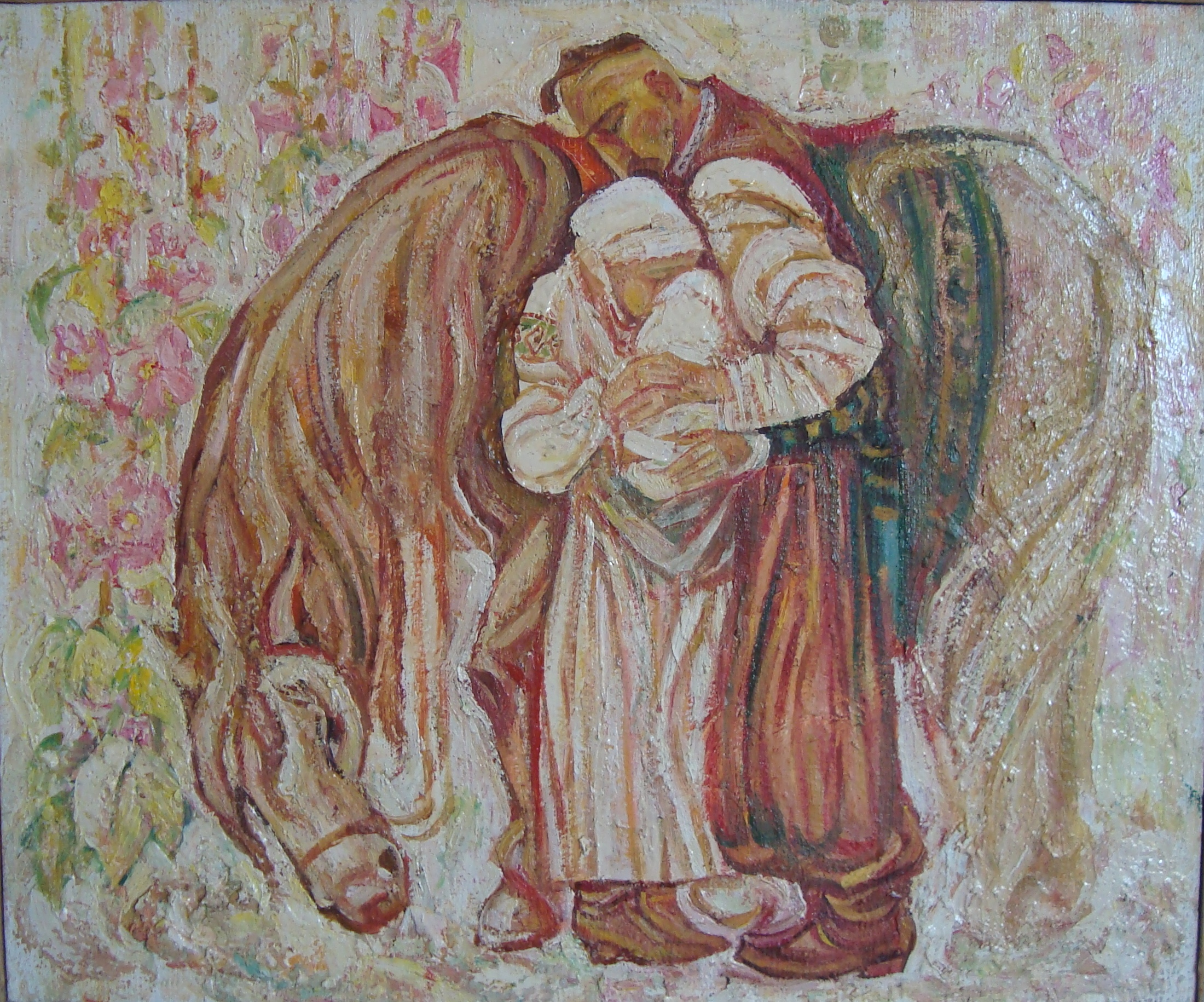
A Cossack Farewell. 2011, - oil, canvas. - 60х80 cm.
