= Hlushyn =

Rural locality in Lviv Oblast, Ukraine

Hlushyn Глушин
- Village
- Location within Ukraine Location within Lviv Oblast
- Coordinates: 50°01′52″N 25°06′59″E
- Country: Ukraine
- Oblast: Lviv Oblast
- District: Zolochiv Raion
- Established: 1511

Area
  - Total: 2.01 km^{2} (0.78 sq mi)
- Elevation /(average value of): 367 m (1,204 ft)

Population
  - Total: 276
  - Density: 180.51/km^{2} (467.5/sq mi)
- Time zone: UTC+2 (EET)
  - Summer (DST): UTC+3 (EEST)
- Postal code: 80640
- Area code: +380 3266
- Website: село Глушин^{(Ukrainian)}

Hlushyn (Ukrainian: Глушин) is a village (selo) in Zolochiv Raion, Lviv Oblast, in western Ukraine. It belongs to Brody urban hromada, one of the hromadas of Ukraine. Area of the village totals is 2.01 km^{2} and the population of village is just about 276 persons. Local government is administered by Ponykovytska village council.

From 1918 to 1939 the village was in Tarnopol Voivodeship in Poland.

Until 18 July 2020, Hlushyn belonged to Brody Raion. The raion was abolished in July 2020 as part of the administrative reform of Ukraine, which reduced the number of raions of Lviv Oblast to seven. The area of Brody Raion was merged into Zolochiv Raion.

== Geography ==
The village is located on the right bank of the upper reaches Styr River. It is located at a distance of 1 kilometre (0.62 mi) from the highway in European route E40 E40 connecting Lviv with Kyiv. Distance from the regional center Lviv is 99 kilometres (62 mi) , 10 kilometres (6.2 mi) from the district center Brody, and 446 kilometres (277 mi) from Kyiv.

== Religious structures ==
In the village there are two churches:

- Church Dormition of the Theotokos (1920, wooden) (UGCC)
- Church Dormition of the Theotokos (stone) (OCU)

== People from Hlushyn ==
- Roman Bezpalkiv (1938 - 2009) – Ukrainian painter, Honored Art Worker of Ukraine.
- Bezpalkiv Mykhaylo (1939) – Ukrainian painter, Honored Art Worker of Ukraine.
