= Roman Bezpalkiv =

Ukrainian painter (1938–2009)

- Роман Безпалків
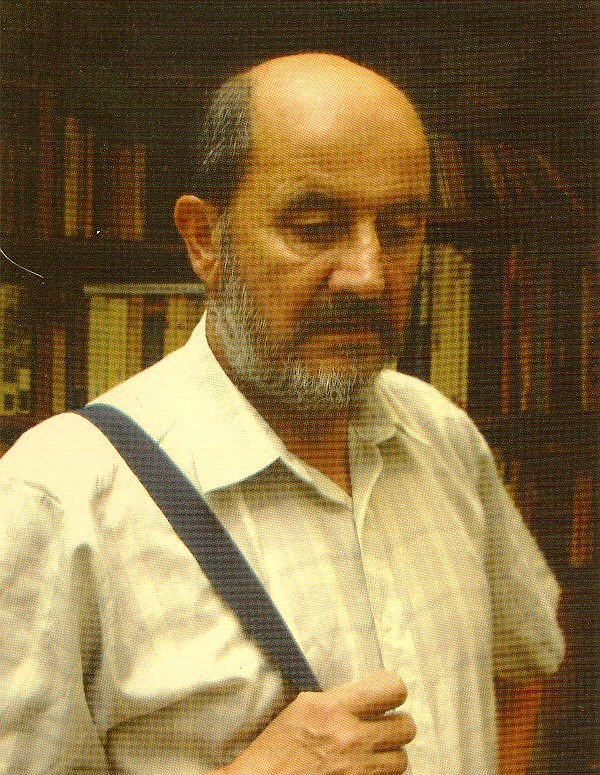
- Bezpalkiv in 2007
- Born: 15 April 1938; Hlushyn, Tarnopol Voivodeship, Poland (now Lviv Oblast, Ukraine)
- Died: 19 November 2009 (aged 71); Lviv, Ukraine
- Resting place: Lychakiv Cemetery, Ukraine
- Education: Lviv Medical Institute (1956–1962); Lviv National Academy of Arts (1965–1971)
- Known for: Painting; drawing
- Movement: Ukrainian impressionism
- Awards: Honored Artist of Ukraine (1998)

Roman Mykhailovych Bezpalkiv (Ukrainian: Роман Михайлович Безпалків; 15 April 1938 – 19 November 2009) was a Ukrainian painter. Known for his painting and sacral art, he was a member of the National Union of Artists of Ukraine (1988), and was titled Honored Artist of Ukraine (1998).

== Biography ==
In 1962, Bezpalkiv graduated from the Lviv Medical Institute. In 1965, he was enrolled in Lviv National Academy of Arts and finished it in 1971.

From 1970, he worked as a teacher of painting in Ivan Trush Lviv College of Decorative and Applied Arts.

Bezpalkiv was the author of many scenic and of sacral of works, among them philosophical portraits of figures of Ukrainian culture as Taras Shevchenko, Bohdan Ihor Antonych, Markiyan Shashkevych, Ivan Vyshenskyi, Kateryna Bilokur and others. He participated in personal, national, and international exhibitions.

He died after a long illness on 19 November 2009 and was buried in the Lychakiv Cemetery, Lviv.

== Literature ==
- Ukrainian: Яців Р. М. Безпалків Роман Михайлович // С. 382. ISBN 966-02-2681-0.
