= Beata Kurkul =

Ukrainian artist

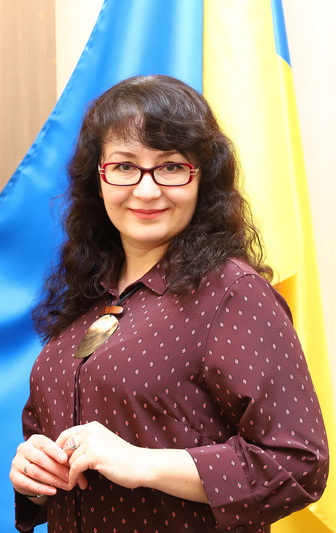
- Born: January 21, 1979 (age 47); Vilnius, Lithuania
- Citizenship: Lithuania
- Education: Vilnius College (doctor, 1998-2001); Vilnius Pedagogical University (historian, 2001-2005)
- Occupations: artist, volunteer
- Employer: GrandMA Studios^{d}
- Known for: pictures of Ukrainian military servicemen
- Spouse: Mykola Avdieiev

Beata Kurkul (Lithuanian: Beata Kurkul, Ukrainian: Беата Куркуль, born 21 January 1979 in Vilnius, Lithuania) is a Ukrainian artist and volunteer of Lithuanian-Polish origin, known for her numerous images of Ukrainian border guards and other Ukrainian military servicemen or participants of the Russo-Ukrainian War.

== Biography ==
Beata Kurkul was born on 21 January 1979 in Vilnius into a Polish family. Her mother was a chemist and her father was an engineer. Beata was named after the favorite actress of her father: Beata Tyszkiewicz. In 1997 she graduated from an art school, but went for a higher education in the field of medicine, at Vilnius College. She has worked as a nurse for some time, until occupational burnout forced her to leave this profession.

Beata became a fan of the film franchise "Star Wars" and began to spend a lot of time on fan-forums. At the end of 2004, Beata went to Kyiv to visit another "Star Wars" fan, her future husband, Mykola Avdieiev, a Ukrainian, whom she had previously met on the Internet forum. In 2007, he proposed to her and in 2008 they got married. The couple then had to decide on their place of residence: Lithuania or Ukraine. They decided to live together in Ukraine. The main factor influencing their decision was language: it would be much easier for Beata, who spoke Russian and understood Ukrainian because of its similarity to Polish (which she also spoke), to adapt in Ukraine, than for her husband to adapt in Lithuania.

While yet living in Lithuania and working as a nurse, Beata returned to her childhood hobby - drawing. She was motivated by her passion for "Star Wars": she started drawing fan art related to this fantasy universe. After moving to Ukraine, she got a job of a concept artist in the field of video game development, in which she still works, having reached a position of an art director. In 2008-2011 she worked at the "ERS Game Studio" company, in 2011–2018 at "Rightcom United LP", and from 2018 on she works at "GrandMA Studios" (whose products include "Mystery Case Files", a popular game serie).

When in 2014 the Russian armed aggression against Ukraine began, her husband began helping the Ukrainian military as a volunteer. After some time, when her husband became very overloaded with volunteer work, Beata began to help him a bit, and later she completely immersed into volunteer activities herself. When Ukrainian border guards in the Luhansk Oblast came under severe criticism from society for their alleged hesitancy, the couple decided to focus their efforts on helping the border guards. The couple made efforts to provide military personnel with equipment (in particular, helmets, body armor and optical devices), medicine, uniforms and footwear.

== Art ==
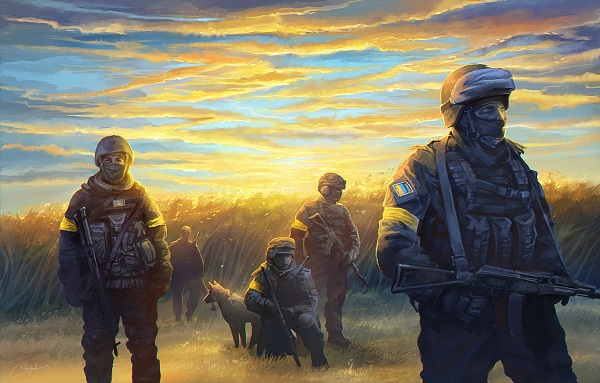
"Sunrise", 2022

Beata's art on the topic of Ukrainian border guards and military servicemen began with a cartoon of border guard Roman Dumyak, who served at the Krasna Talivka border checkpoint. The couple fundraised money to purchase a collimator for this serviceman, and Beata drew a cartoon of him on the box with collimator, taking a photo from social media as a basis. The first serious drawing on this topic appeared after the couple visited a military hospital, where the artist was inspired to create a picture of a Ukrainian border guard. This was followed by other drawings. In the beginning, in addition to the desire for creative expression, she was also motivated to draw by the opportunity to mock her Russian peers. According to Beata, popularity came to her when her drawings were reposted by the Facebook page of the "Right Sector".

Over the years of her creative activity, there have been several dozen exhibitions of her works, including the exhibition at the Boryspil Airport in 2015, exhibitions at the Kharkiv National Academic Opera and Ballet Theatre in the Kuindzhi Center for Contemporary Art and Culture in Mariupol in 2016, an exhibition in Palanok Castle in Mukachevo in 2017, an exhibition in Izmail in 2019, in Chop in 2020 and so on. During the full scale Russian invasion of Ukraine she regularly took her exhibitions to the frontline towns. In the middle of 2023, an exhibition of her works was held in the courtyard of the Seimas Palace (Parliament building) in Vilnius, and also in one of the biggest malls of Vilnius.

She regularly visits places where border guards are stationed, where she also holds exhibitions of her works, at the same time collecting plots and inspiration for further works. Beata gathers ideas for her works by observing border guards work, looking at photos of their service or listening to their stories.

Some of Beata's pictures became significantly more popular than others, for example "Daddy's daughter" (picture of a border guard with his little daughter), "Life goes on" (picture of a girl in a border guard's beret), "Defending the border" (picture of three border guards and a dog next to a border marker), "Paladin" (drawing of a soldier with a sword) or "Paramedics" (picture of a military paramedic with angel wings).

In 2021, the publishing house "Vydavnytstvo" published the comic book "On a big land", which tells a story about the return of a Ukrainian soldier back to civilian life after being wounded. The drawings for this book were made by Beata Kurkul. Before that, in 2020, two compilation albums of her works were published: "Always on guard" and "Four Elements of the Border".

On 25 August 2015, at the Krasna Talivka checkpoint, a monument was opened dedicated to four border guards who died in a battle with a Russian reconnaissance group exactly one year before. Beata Kurkul developed a sketch of this monument.

In 2022 she gained even bigger popularity when she published drawings about the war in Ukraine, created by her using Midjourney neural network. According to Beata herself, she does not strive for photorealism in her works, it is more important for her to convey emotions and an atmosphere. For this, for example, she often uses mythological or magical motifs.

Although she is often called a Lithuanian artist, she identifies herself as a Ukrainian artist:

When it is said that I am a Ukrainian artist, it is not just partly true, it is completely true. Because in Lithuania I was a nurse. Me being an artist, I attribute exactly to Ukraine, because as an artist I formed and developed here.
Когда говорят, что я украинская художница, в этом даже не доля правды, это полностю правда. Потому что в Литве я была медсестрой. То, что я стала художницей, это заслуга именно Украины, поскольку как художник я сформировалась и развилась именно здесь.

— Beata Kurkul

== See also ==
- Civil volunteer movement helping Ukrainian forces in the war in Donbas
- State Border Guard Service of Ukraine
- Lithuanians
