= Michel Korochansky =

French painter of Ukrainian descent

Michel Korochansky (1866–1925) was a Ukrainian naturalized French painter and illustrator.

== Biography ==
Michel Korochansky (Odessa 1866 – Montigny sur Loing 1925) was born in Odessa and went to Paris to study with William Bougereau (1825–1905) and Tony Robert-Fleury (1837–1911) at the Académie Julian in the period 1884–1890. There he became a naturalized citizen in 1906, lived in Paris Rue de la Tour d ' Auvergne 39 and exhibited at the Salon des artistes français, scenes of villages, orchards, seaside since 1890. Michel Korochansky is cited at the Salon de la Société des Artistes Indépendants in 1901 and in 1910, where he obtained an honorable mention, at the Galerie Cousin in Paris (1908), at the Galerie Berne Lecourt in Paris (1910) and at the Musée du Luxembourg (1924) in fact Parisian government purchased some of his paintings. One of his friends was Numa Gillet (1868–1940), who introduced him to Montigny-Sur-Loing in 1889. Korochansky loved the place and married a Montigny girl. The couple had only a daughter, Christiane Korochansky (1903–1985), who became a painter. Before 1914 he had a house built in the forest, where he regularly spend the summers. He was one of the best friend of the Canadian artist Frederic Ede (1865–1913) and made him discover the little village of Montigny-sur-Loing, near Fontainebleau's forest. As illustrator he created 80 drawings for the book "Vera Jélikhovska Memories of a little Russian girl" written by Leon Golschmann, Paris, Editions Hennuyer, 1896 and other drawings for "L'ame russe. Contes choisis de Pouchkine, Gogol, Tourguénev, Dostoïevsky, Garchine, Léon Tolstoï", Paris, Paul Ollendorff – 1896.

== Artwork ==
In figural paintings he shows his academic studies reinterpreting the lesson of Bougherau in an impressionist key. On the contrary, in landscapes and marines can be considered a post-impressionist painter in which colours and its reflections divide the light and translate its variations almost instinctively. By the speed of its touch and his palette, large and fragmented, he shows great dexterity in passages and tonal transitions.

== Works ==
- Coin de rivière (lost since 1923)
- Girl with a red scarf in her hair, oil on canvas, signed M. Korochansky
- Woman in the wood, oil on canvas, signed M. Korochansky
- Young Peasant, oil on table, signed M. Korochansky
- Young peasant with flowers, oil on canvas, signed M. Korochansky
- Girl with irises, oil on canvas, signed M. Korochansky
- A young woman from Pont-Aven, oil on canvas, unsigned and attributed to M. Korochansky
- Landscape with Sheep and Shepherd, oil on canvas, signed M. Korochansky
- A house by a forest lake at sunset, oil on canvas, signed M. Korochansky
- Tending the orchard, oil on canvas, signed M. Korochansky
- A cottage at dusk, oil on canvas, signed M. Korochansky
- Shepherd in a field, oil on canvas, signed M. Korochansky
- Gathering wood, oil on canvas, signed M. Korochansky
