= Olha Pilyuhina =

Ukrainian artist

- О́льга Євге́ніївна Пілю́гіна
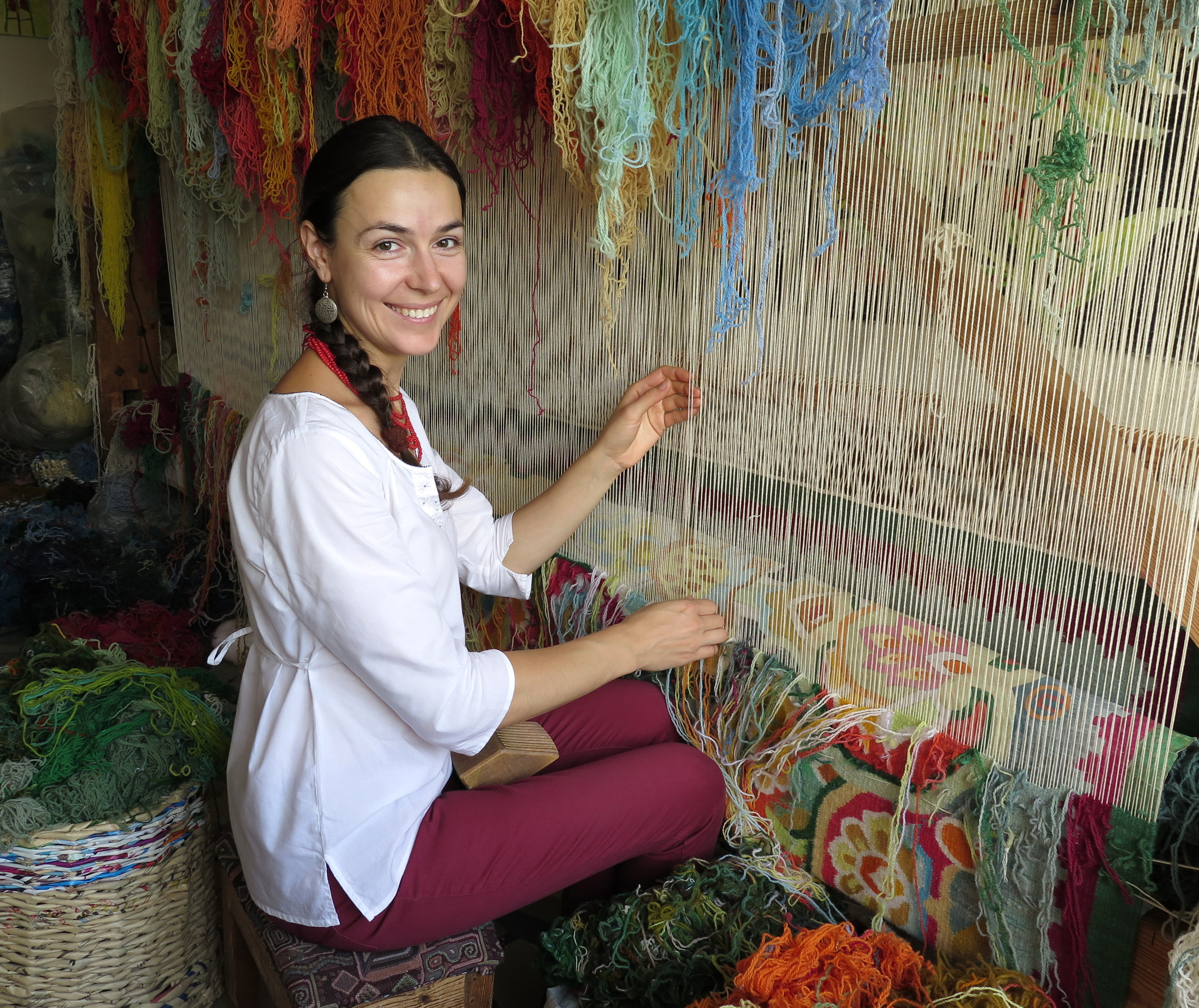
- Born: October 7, 1982 (age 44); Reshetylivka, Poltava region, Ukraine
- Citizenship: Ukraine
- Education: Reshetylivka Art School (hand embroidery); National University "Yuri Kondratyuk Poltava Polytechnic" (fine and decorative arts)
- Occupation: painter
- Style: tapestry, rug making, vytynanky, ceramic, sculpture

Olha Pilyuhina (Ukrainian: О́льга Євге́ніївна Пілю́гіна, born 7 October 1982, Reshetylivka, Poltava region, Ukraine) is a Ukrainian artist. She is the author of tapestries, vytynanky, etc.

She is an Honored Master of Folk Art of Ukraine, a member of the National Union of Artists of Ukraine and the National Union of Masters of Folk Art of Ukraine, a laureate of the I. P. Kotliarevskyi and O. Dmytrenko Prizes, a holder of the Presidential Grant of Ukraine, and a scholarship holder of the President of Ukraine in 2012–2015.

She has created over 150 unique tapestries.

== Biography ==
Olha Pilyuhina was born on October 7, 1982, in Reshetylivka, Poltava region, Ukraine, into a family of artists: her father, Yevhen Pilyuhin, was a master of carpet weaving, and her mother, Larysa Pilyuhina, was an embroidery artist.

She started weaving professionally at the age of 11. In 2005, she graduated from Poltava National Technical University. From 2005 to 2015, she worked as a lecturer at the Poltava Children's Art School. She is the author of the textbook "School of Crafts. Straw Weaving. Carpet Weaving," published by Shkilnyi Svit.

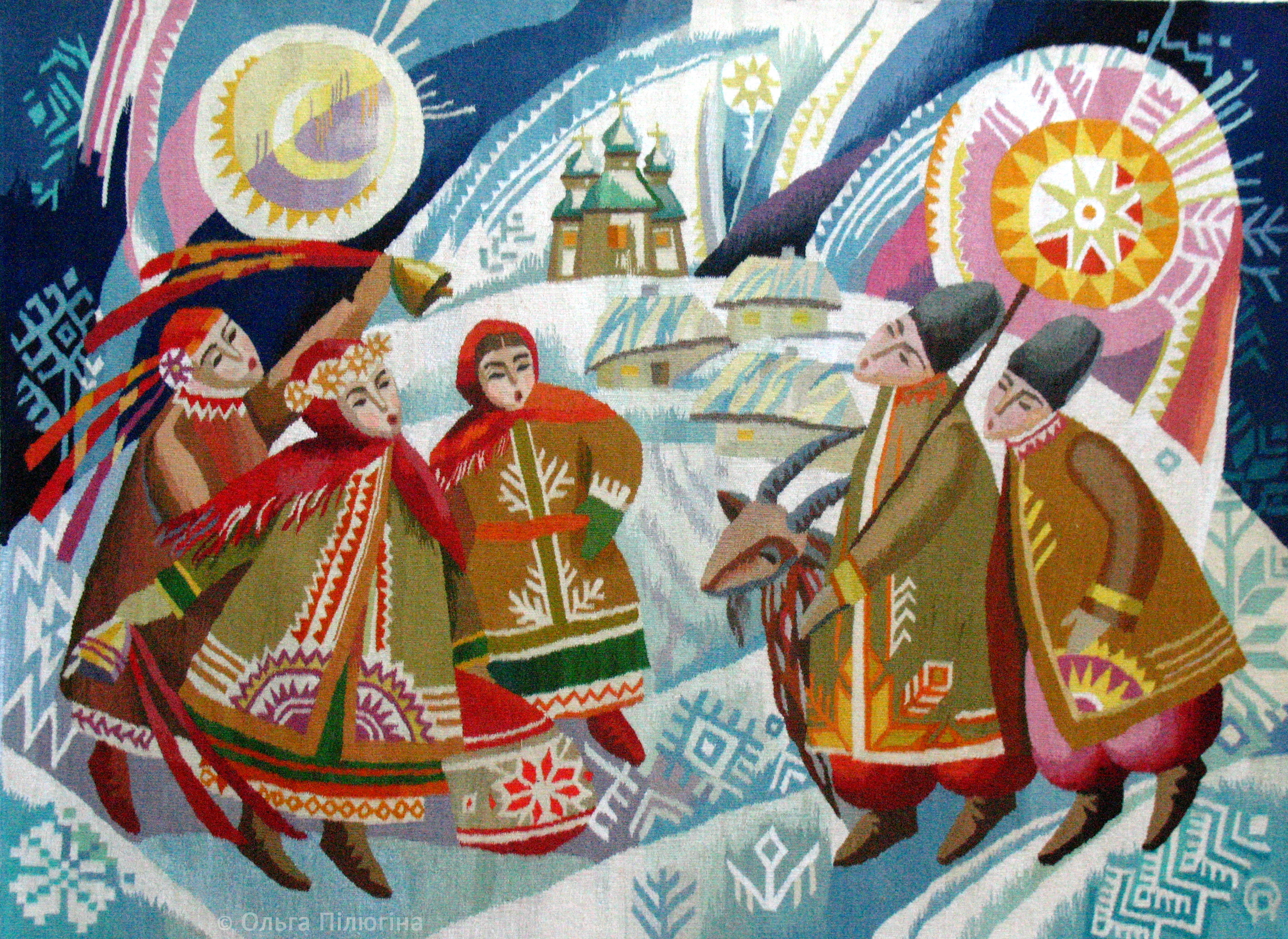
"Koliada". Olha Pilyuhina's Tapestry (2008)

Olha Pilyuhina's most famous work is the tapestry "Koliada" (2008). This composition has become one of the most popular in Ukraine for the New Year and Christmas season. The artwork has been widely used in greeting publications, postcards, banners, billboards, and covers of various publications, including by the highest state officials of Ukraine.

In 2013, she received a Presidential Grant of Ukraine to create the tapestry "Hetmansky", which became the first in the "Carpeted Ukraine" series of ornamental tapestries. Each of these tapestries was recognized as the best work in the All-Ukrainian Art Project-Competition "Best Work of the Year": "Hetmansky" (2014), "Rozkvit" (Blossoming) (2015), "Kozatsky" (Cossack) (2016), "Dobrobut" (Well-being) (2017), "Zorianyi" (Starry) (2018), "Kvituiacha Rodyna" (Blooming Family) (2019).

In 2016, she received a letter of appreciation from the Governor of the National Bank of Ukraine for the "Colors of the Native Land" exhibition, dedicated to the 25th anniversary of Ukraine's Independence and the Day of the National Flag, where she introduced the employees and guests of the country's highest financial institution to her work.

In 2017, she held a personal exhibition "Carpeted Ukraine" in the Verkhovna Rada of Ukraine, aimed at promoting and drawing attention to tapestry weaving as a rapidly disappearing art form.

In 2018, at the initiative of the National Academy of Pedagogical Sciences of Ukraine, she created a portrait of Borys Paton, the President of the National Academy of Sciences of Ukraine, for his 100th anniversary.

In 2023, the KHUSTYNA brand collaborated with Olha Pilyuhina to create a collection of scarves inspired by her carpets. Six out of nine designs in the collection were based on her works.

Her works are housed in the collections of the National Museum of Decorative Arts of Ukraine, the Kyiv History Museum, the Embassy of Ukraine in Bulgaria, the Dmytro Yavornytsky Dnipro Historical Museum, the Poltava Art Museum (Yaroshenko Gallery), the National University "Poltava Polytechnic named after Yuri Kondratyuk", and various other state, corporate, and private collections.

== Professional and research activities ==
Pilyuhina actively participates in scientific and practical conferences and other events dedicated to preserving and developing cultural heritage, particularly the traditions of Ukrainian tapestry weaving and its place in contemporary cultural spaces.

She is dedicated to preserving and developing Ukrainian tapestry traditions, conducts master classes, and passes on her experience to the younger generation. She teaches at the National University "Poltava Polytechnic named after Yuri Kondratyuk", training future artists in the Department of Fine and Decorative Arts. She also researches Ukrainian ornamentation and develops new, recognizable authorial compositions, modernizing traditional folk motifs. She creates her tapestries by hand using traditional techniques.

== Recognition and awards ==
Olha Pilyuhina has been included in the National Register of Intangible Cultural Heritage of Ukraine as a bearer of the element "The Tradition of Plant Motif Carpet Weaving in Reshetylivka, Poltava Region," which is being considered for inclusion in UNESCO's Representative List of Intangible Cultural Heritage.

Several television documentaries have been made about her work, including:

- "Contemporaries with Mariia Boiko. The Pilyuhin Family", Studio "Misto" (2013)
- "Cultural Hub. Reshetylivka", Media Center of the Ivan Honchar Museum (2015)
- "Enchanted Carpets" and "Melody of Tapestry", UTR TV (2015)
- "The Art of Tapestry Weaving", Studio "Euphoria" (2019)
- "Art in a Country at War: Olha Pilyuhina", Babylon’13 Film Collective (2022)

=== Awards ===
- Certificates of honor from the Ministry of Culture of Ukraine (2007, 2012, 2013) for significant contributions to cultural values, youth education, and professional excellence
- Winner of the I. P. Kotliarevskyi Prize (2007)
- Presidential Scholarship of Ukraine (2012–2015)
- Winner of the Poltava Regional Competition "Successful Woman of Poltava – Cultural and Artistic Figure" (2016)
- Recipient of the O. Dmytrenko Literary and Artistic Prize (2017)
- Honored Master of Folk Art of Ukraine (2021)
- Lesia Ukrainka Medal (2025) for contributions to artistic education and long-term collaboration with the National Academy of Pedagogical Sciences of Ukraine

== Exhibitions ==
She started her exhibition activity in 1995. She is a regular participant in personal, international, national, regional and regional art exhibitions.

== Gallery ==
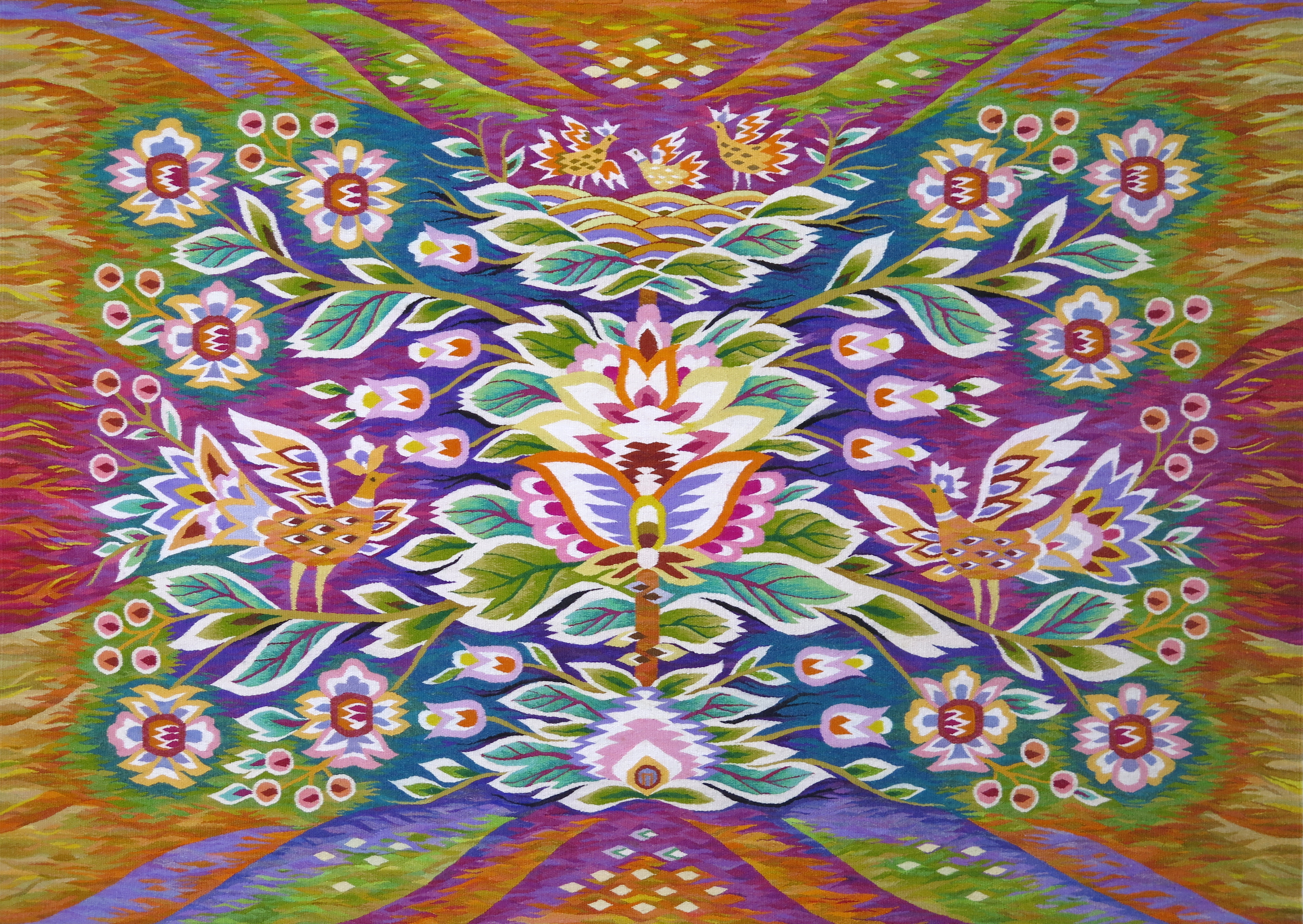
Tapestry “Blooming Family” by Olha Pilyuhina

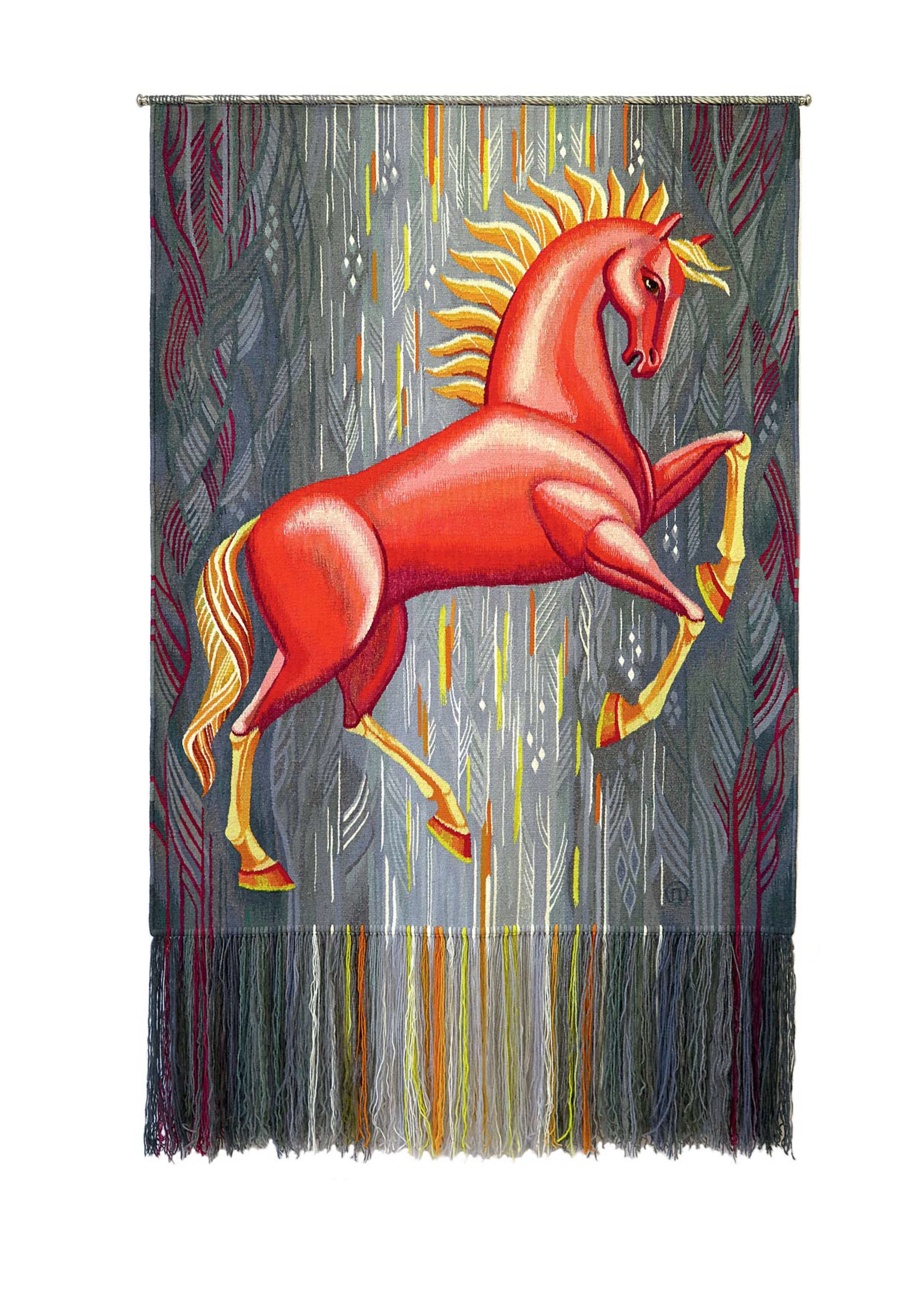
Tapestry “Dawn” by Olha Pilyuhina, 2018, 155 x 121 cm

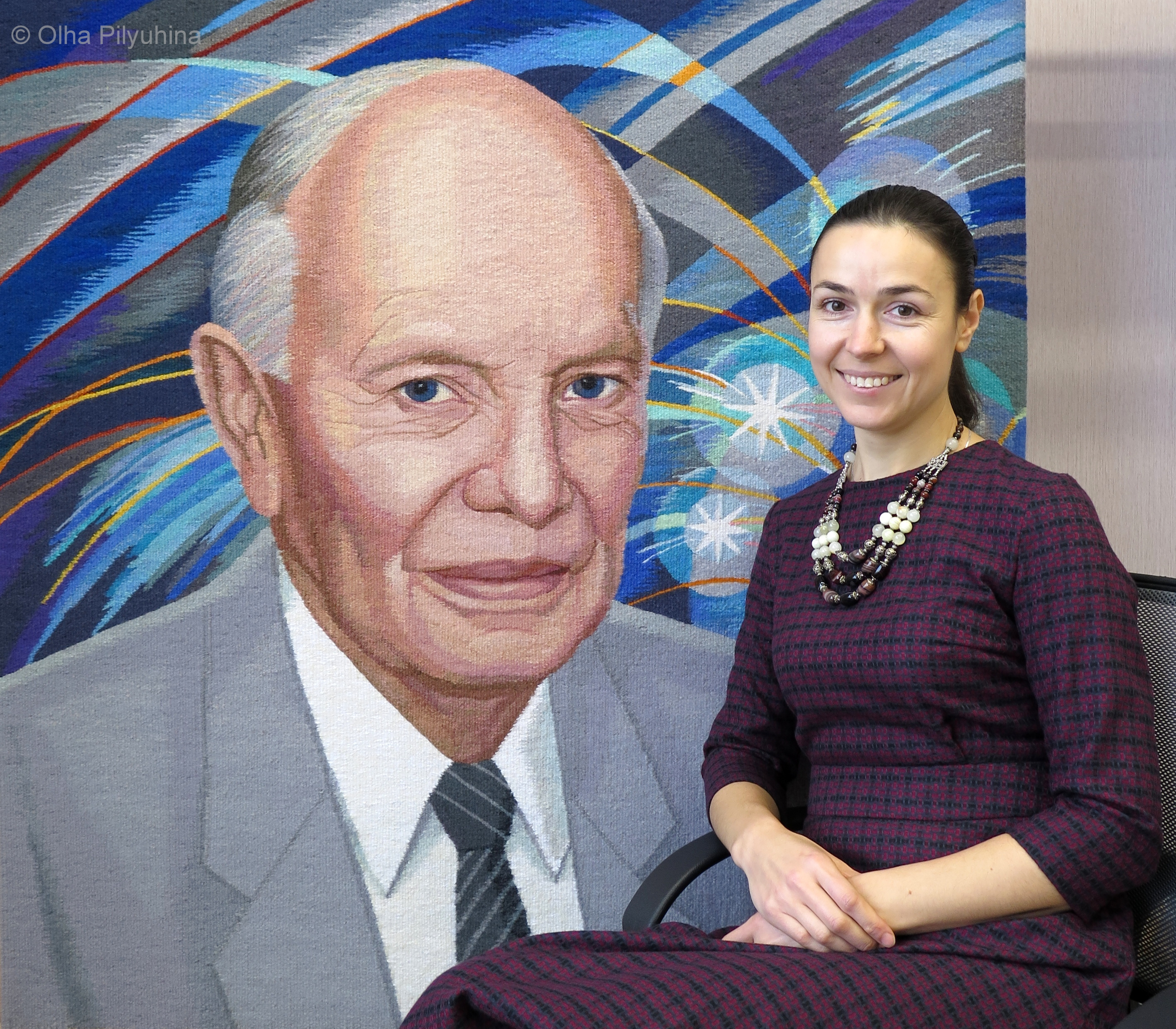
The artist Olha Pilyuhina. and the portrait of Borys Paton

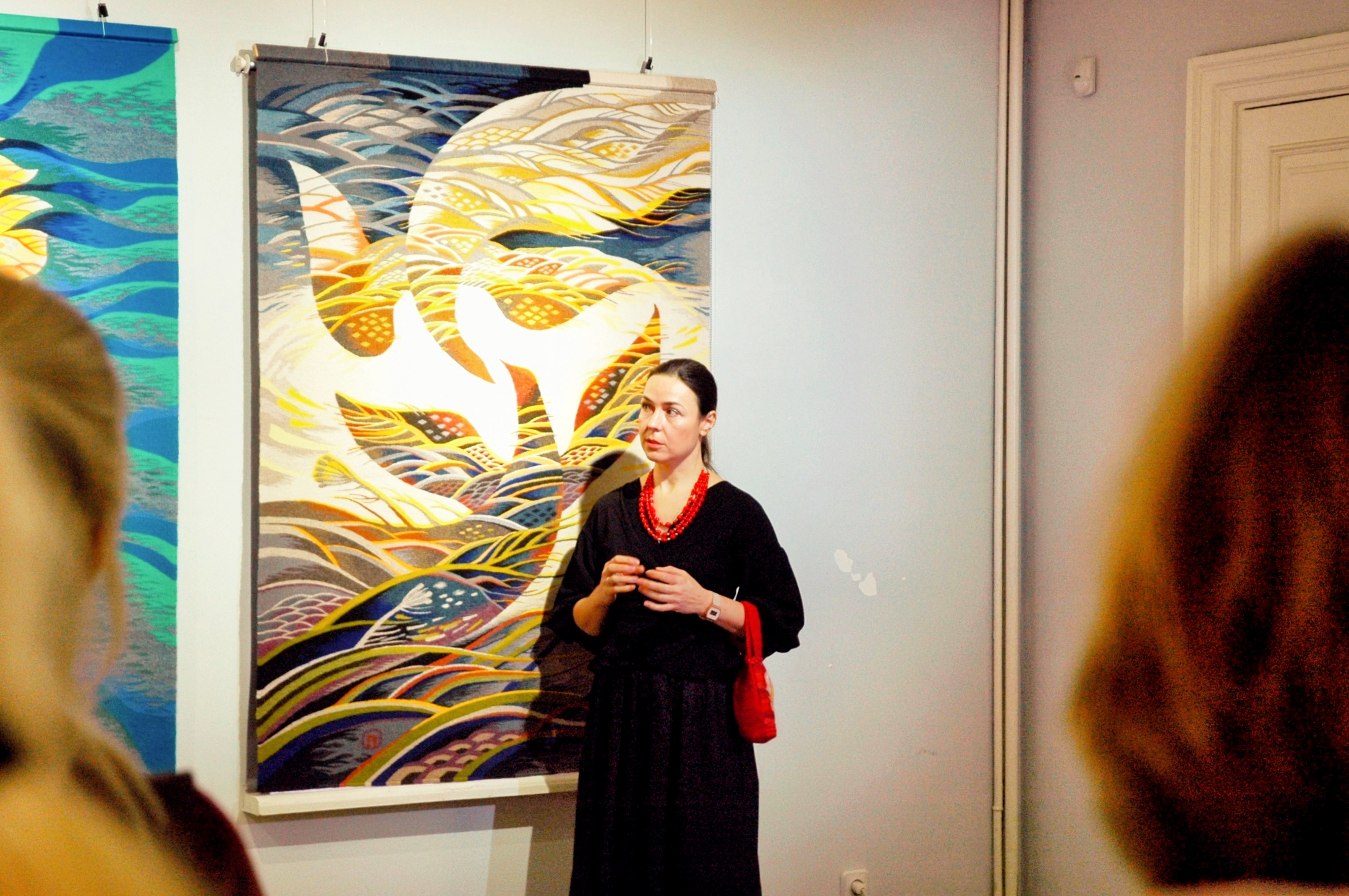
Ukrainian artist Olha Pilyuhina gives a tour of her exhibition “Meta” at the Museum of Ukrainian Diaspora. Kyiv, 2024
