= Hanna Sobachko-Shostak =

Ukrainian painter (1883–1965)

Hanna Shostak
- Ганна Шостак
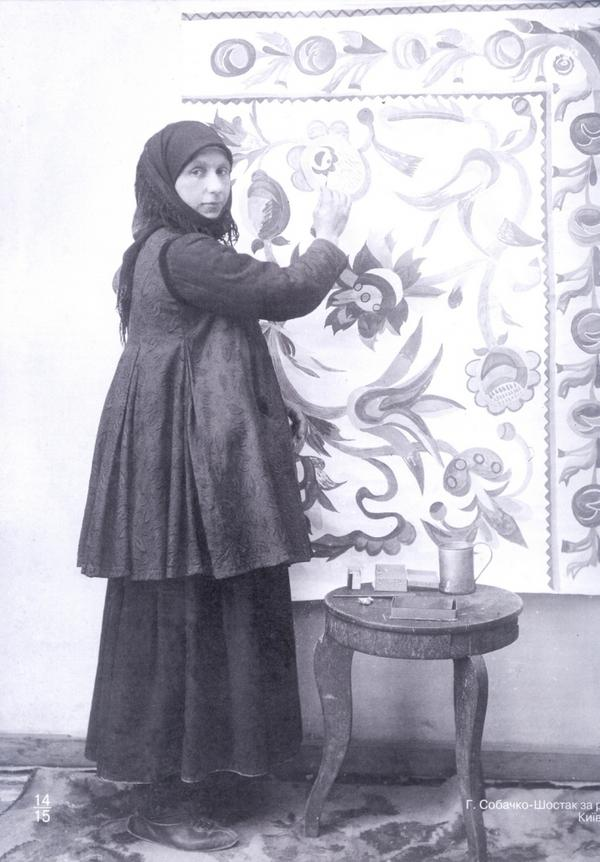
- Shostak in 1915
- Born: 1883; Skoptsi, Russian Empire
- Died: 1965 (aged 81–82)
- Occupation: Painter

Hanna Fedosivna Shostak (Ukrainian: Га́нна Федосівна Шоста́к; née Sobachko; 1883–1965) was a Ukrainian folk art painter. She was a member of the USSR Union of Artists and Master of Folk Art of the UkSSR (Майстер народного мистецтва УРСР).

== Life ==
She was born in 1883 in Skoptsi, Poltava Governorate and she had a rudimentary education. Her interest in skill in art was largely self-taught. She came under the influence of mentors that included Aleksandra Ekster. With their guidance her folk art designs were used for carpets. The carpets won awards.

In 1963–1964 her designs were featured on Ukrainian stamps. She became a member of the USSR Union of Artists and Master of Folk Art of the UkSSR (Майстер народного мистецтва УРСР).

== Gallery ==
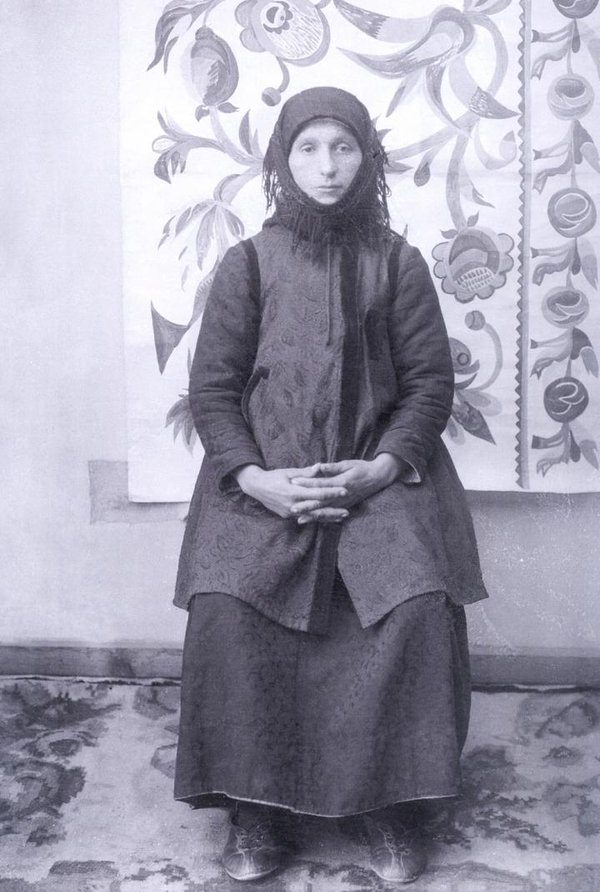
Hanna Shostak in 1915

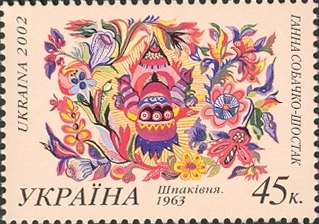
Stamp of Ukraine s463

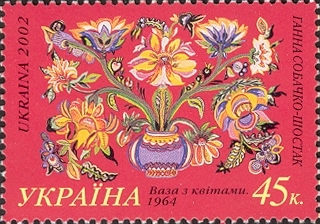
A 2002 Ukrainian postage stamp featuring her work

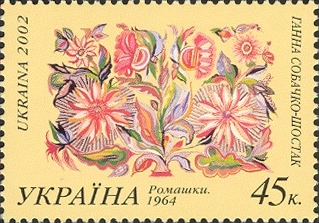
Stamp of Ukraine s465
