= Civil volunteer movement helping Ukrainian forces in the war in Donbas =

Civil society movement to assist Ukrainian soldiers in the Donbas war

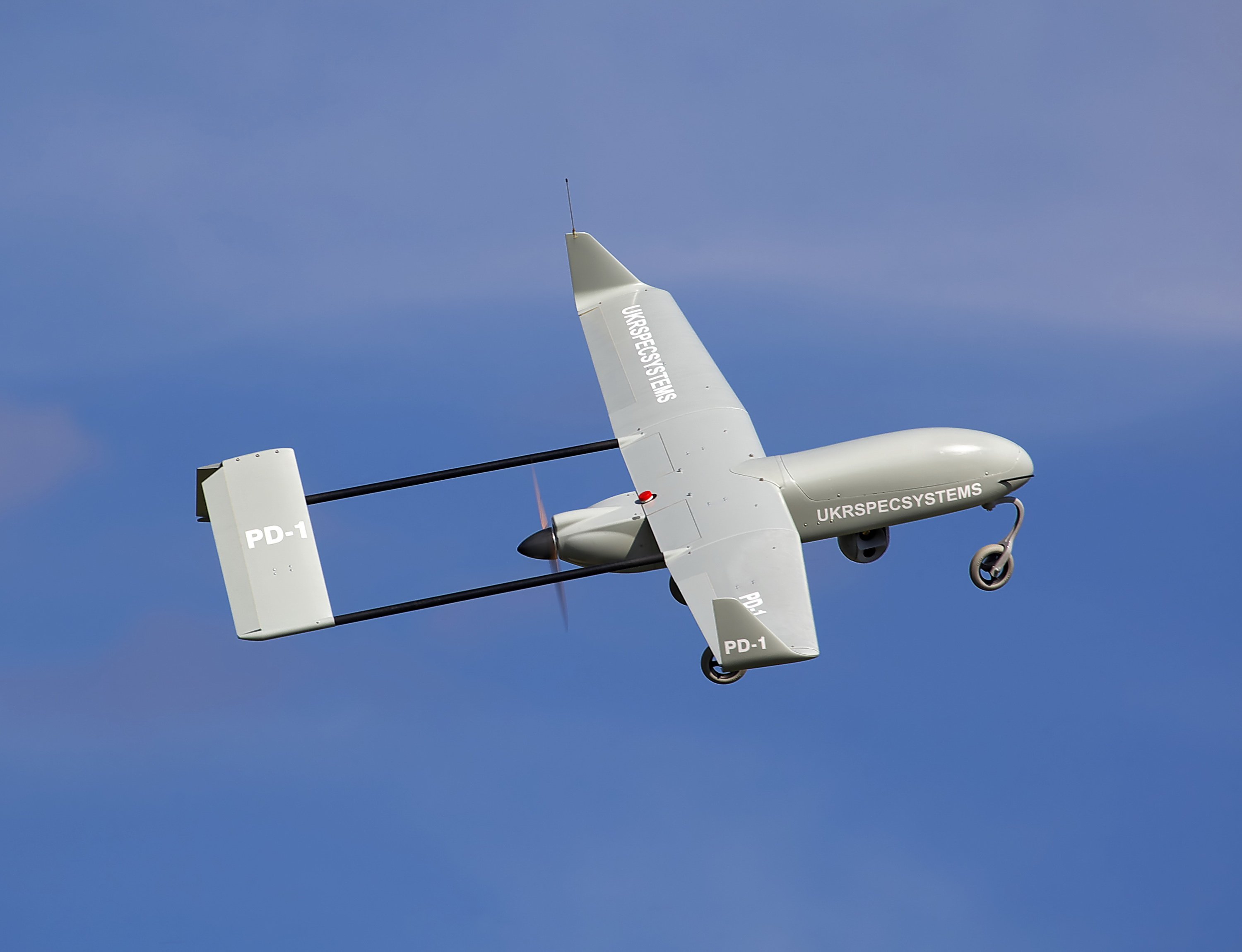
Drone PD-1 created in Ukraine with support of the volunteer group People's Project

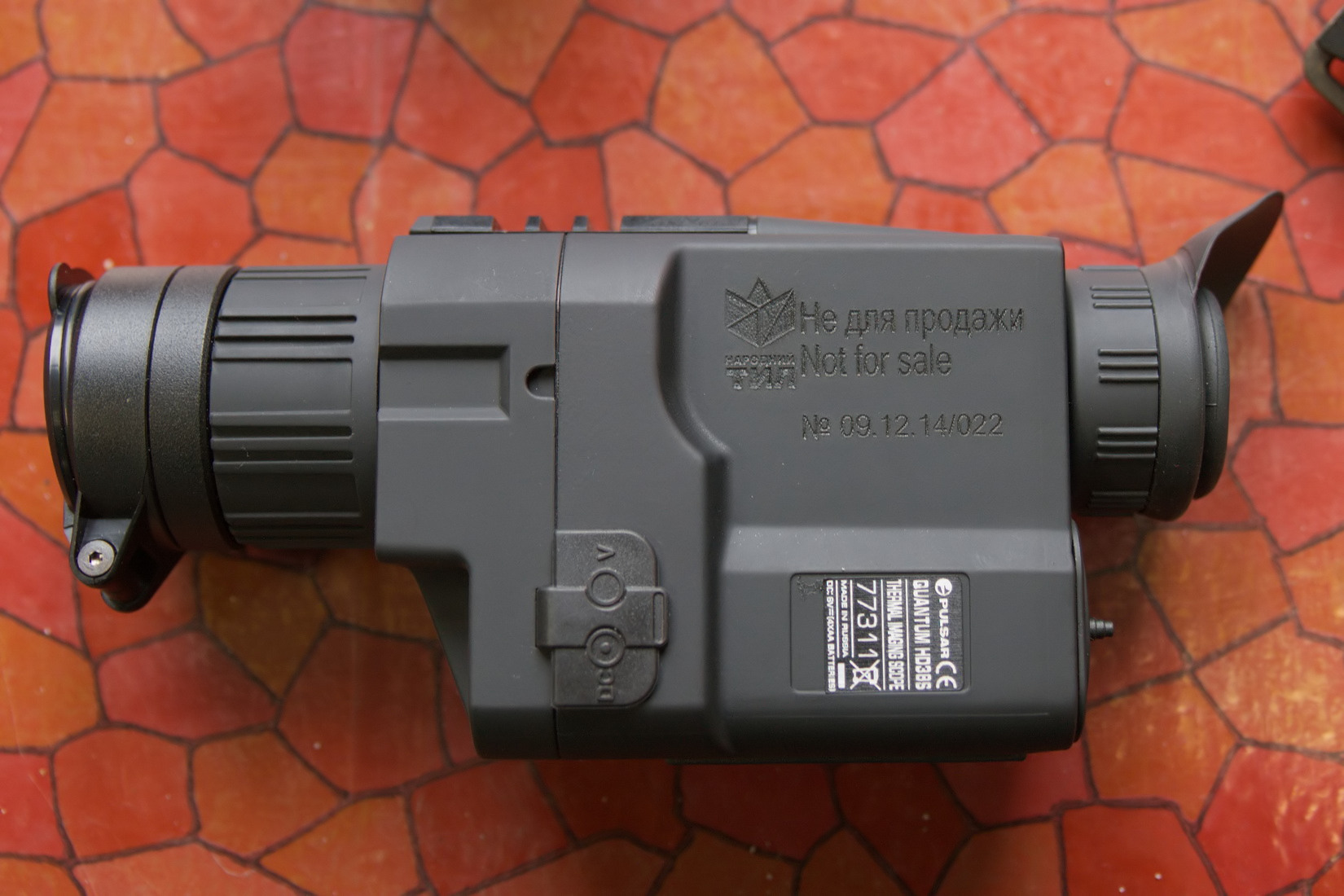
Thermographic camera supplied by the volunteer group National Home Front. Marking "Not for sale" is seen.

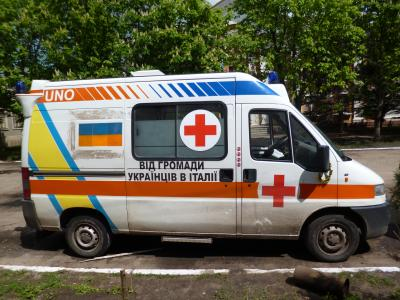
Ambulance donated to Ukrainian forces by Italian Ukrainians.

The Russo-Ukrainian War gave rise to a civil volunteer movement which provides diverse support to Ukrainian soldiers fighting in Donetsk and Luhansk oblasts.

This movement partially emerged from the volunteer movement which helped participants of Euromaidan, and has allied movements specialized in providing help to injured and internally displaced people, as well as conducting searches for soldiers who are missing in action or killed in action.

== History ==
At the beginning of the war, the Ukrainian army was badly prepared for the fighting, and the government was unable to equip it properly in a short time; even food and uniforms were in short supply. Such weakness of post-crisis state facing external intervention forced active strata of society to take care of the army themselves. Many of these people previously volunteered on Euromaidan, and this experience helped the movement significantly.

In several months, some volunteer initiatives grew from groups in social networks into powerful crowdfunding projects which supplied the army with costly equipment like thermographic cameras, unmanned aerial vehicles, spaced armour and so on. Some of these groups achieved high effectiveness and transparency. According to the rating by Ukrainian Philanthropists Association, several of them were the most efficient and transparent Ukrainian charitable projects, and according to historian Andrew Wilson, the transparency standards of some of these organizations "shamed the Ukrainian state". On the other hand, cases of swindlers who disguised themselves as volunteers were also uncovered.

In the autumn 2014, the government began engaging in considerable collaboration with the volunteers. Several well-known activists received positions in governmental structures, including Ministry of Defence, where they work on improving army supply and in other fields. Some of them became assistants and advisors to the minister and the president. In October, a Council of Volunteers was founded at the ministry.

== Activities ==
The volunteers' aid to Ukrainian military units includes:

- Everyday necessities and medical supply (mainly in the first months of the war) such as: food, medicines (including individual medical kits and equipment of field hospitals), clothes (including uniform and ghillie suits), heaters, generators, motor transport and spare parts, mobile shower cubicles and laundries, blindages etc.
- Military equipment: camouflage nets, bulletproof vests, combat helmets, walkie-talkies, unmanned aerial vehicles (including some created by volunteers themselves), night vision devices, thermographic cameras, sights and suppressors for the guns, artillery rangefinders, repairing of optical devices and weapons, etc. Volunteer projects also include the development and introduction of electronic systems of artillery data exchange and management of gunfire, as well as software for calculating the settings of tank shooting.
- Equipping various vehicles with spaced armour, repairing and improving motor transport and sometimes even aircraft and ships.
- Training of servicemen, including divers, sappers and snipers.

There are also allied volunteer movements which:

- provide medical help to injured people and equip hospitals;
- help internally displaced people from Donbas and Crimea to find new home, work, and adapt to their new homes;
- search for people who are missing in action or killed;
- work for liberation of captives.

Major volunteer organizations work on the basis of crowdfunding, collecting money through systems of non-cash payments and publishing the lists of contributions and purchases on the Internet.

According to an estimate of a noted volunteer, the founder of Come Back Alive Vitaliy Deynega, over 2 years of the war (until April 2016), volunteers collected more than ₴1 billion (about US$50 million) for the needs of the Ukrainian army. One third of this money was gathered by big volunteer organizations.

== Structure ==
The movement is active all over the country, except in areas not controlled by the government. It consists of thousands of organizations and individual volunteers. Their precise number is impossible to determine; it is permanently changing, and many volunteers do not publicize their work. The activity of the movement peaked in periods of the most intense war. According to an estimate of well-known volunteer David Arakhamia (May 2015), about 14,500 people and over 2500 organizations are engaged in regular and systematic volunteer activity.

The most powerful volunteer organizations include People's Project, National Home Front, Come Back Alive, Phoenix Wings, Combat-UA, Army SOS and others.

According to a sociological survey conducted in September 2014 (after five months of the war), one third of Ukrainian citizens had sent money on the bank accounts opened for the army by Ministry of Defence, and one quarter had sent money to the volunteers. The movement involves many different people and kinds of activity: even schoolchildren of Minor Academy of Sciences of Ukraine suggested numerous models of military equipment in their competitions of scientific and technical projects.

The Ukrainian diaspora participates in the movement significantly. Groups in the US, Canada, European and other countries collect money, buy medical supplies and other goods, organize cultural events and support the movement in other ways.

In October 2014, a Council of Volunteers was founded at the Ministry of Defence. It is intended for army supply, repair of hardware, purchase of equipment, improvement of military medicine and correction of various flaws in the ministerial work. Next month, Association of People's Volunteers of Ukraine was founded. Its goal is concentrating volunteers' experience and proposal of ideas to the Ministry. The Association comprises about 30 volunteer organizations and delegates its members to the council.

== Public and governmental appreciation ==
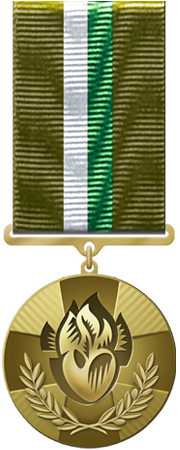
Decoration of the President of Ukraine "For Humanitarian Participation in the Anti-Terrorist Operation".

According to several sociological surveys conducted in 2014–2016, the civil volunteers enjoy a high degree of public confidence among all non-state (as well as state) institutions of Ukraine. 60-70% of people trust them mainly or entirely. Confidence in the church is usually slightly lower, and the army, volunteer battalions and non-governmental organizations are next in the rating. For example, a poll in February 2016 showed that 71% people trusted the volunteers, while the army and NGOs enjoyed 49% support, local authorities 42%, police 34%, parliament 8%, and courts 5%.

Many civil volunteers are awarded with Ukrainian state awards, including order of Bohdan Khmelnytsky, order of Princess Olga, order For Courage, order of Merit, medals "Defender of the Motherland", "For Saving Life", "For Labour and Victory", "For Assistance to the Armed Forces of Ukraine", premium weapon and clocks. In February 2016, a special president's award for volunteers "For Humanitarian Participation in the Anti-Terrorist Operation" was founded.

Many non-governmental organizations, including churches, award the volunteers with their own prizes. Well-known examples of such awards include the order "People's Hero of Ukraine" which is given by a commission of known servicemen and civil volunteers headed by George Tuka, medal of Ukrainian Orthodox Church of the Kyivan Patriarchate "For self-sacrificingness and love to Ukraine" and others.

In 2015–2016, many streets in Ukrainian cities and villages (including Chernihiv, Kharkiv, Poltava, Vinnytsia and Zhytomyr) were renamed "Volunteers' Street" or "Street of Volunteers" after the civil volunteer movement.
