= Nikolay Malynka =

Ukrainian painter, creative artist and sculptor

Mykola Malynka
- Born: Mykola Malynka; 16 February 1913; Lysniaky, Poltava Governorate, Russian Empire (now Ukraine)
- Died: 14 December 1993 (aged 80); Yahotyn, Kyiv Oblast, Ukraine
- Education: Kyiv Art Institute, Moscow’s Grekov Studio of Battle-Scene Artists
- Known for: Painting, Creative Artistry, Sculpture
- Notable work: Oak on the Coast of Supii(1940)Arcan, the Gutsul’s Dance(1957), On Upper Reaches of Carpathians (1959), The Stacks under Snow (1961), Kobzars (1980), The Sunflowers (1992)
- Style: Socialist realism, Impressionism

Mykola Malynka (Ukrainian: Микола Малинка ‘Mykola Malynka’; February 16, 1913 – December 14, 1993) was a Ukrainian painter, creative artist, and sculptor. He was among those who studied and worked in the Soviet Union where Socialist Realism became a state policy, but is often considered a representative of Ukrainian impressionism as well. Focused on the dramatic depictions of Soviet and Ukrainian history, Mykola Malynka produced canvases of Ukrainian Cossack's quest for peace and freedom, portrayed prominent personalities of the past and present day, composed a brief history of his homeland - Yahotyn county of the Kyiv Oblast. Later, when Gorbachev's policy of Glasnost effectively ended state censorship, he released artworks depicting Ukrainian national tragedies, such as the forcible collectivization and the Holodomor of 1933, which took millions of Ukrainian lives.

== Early life ==
Mykola Malynka was born in small village, Lysniaky, and spent his childhood side by side with picturesque beauty of historical Poltava Governorate (Guberniia) of Dnipro Ukraine (with time, Lysniaky became a part of the county-seat Yahotyn of Kyiv Region).

Since early childhood, he has painted his surroundings. It seemed nobody took seriously a young talent except a local artist and photographer L. Briummer, who persistently advised him to take professional courses. Instead, under parental pressure, Mykola Malynka entered, in 1929, the horticultural school but soon dropped out. Then, he became a student of the book department of the Kharkiv cooperative technical college. The city was a significant cultural center of Soviet Ukraine. The young man read a lot, visited museums and exhibitions, met prominent people and gradually came to a final decision to become an artist.

In autumn 1933, Mykola Malynka enrolled at the Kyiv Art Institute, where he studied fine art and graphics for several years. His studies were interrupted when he was drafted into the army and assigned to a unit in Moscow. While serving there, he continued his artistic training at the fine art studio that later became known as the Grekov Studio of Military Artists. The studio focused on producing artists who depicted the history and activities of the Red Army. Malynka studied under several Soviet artists, including Khrystophor Ushenin, Vasyli Svarog, Yevhen Katsman, and Aleksandr Gerasimov. In 1939, the Soviet newspaper Pravda described Malynka as one of the studio’s stronger students, noting his understanding of colour and composition.

His education was supplemented with Grekov Studio's team expeditions to the Caucasian Region of the country which resulted in several artworks of the socialist realism style. Thus, the gallery of the future artist was started (and overtime increased in size), and first recognition soon followed: Caucasian theme canvases by Nikolay Malynka were exhibited at the Central House of the Soviet Army and honored with the certificate of the heroic deed (gramota) of the Moscow Military District.

== WWII (1939-1945): Personal impact and career ==
The wartime brought destruction in Europe's fallen countries, and political confusion for many of Mykola Malynka's countrymen. At this time, Malynka's temporary location was city of Kosiv, which is part of Ivano-Frankivs’k Region in the west of Ukraine at the present time. Following the order of Soviet authorities, he was in charge of creating a local School of Applied Arts. Meanwhile, the artist's spirit was captured by the beauty of Carpathians, rich ethnos, folklore and memories of long ago. Later, in postwar times, he will produce several masterpieces sunken in Carpathians spirit, such as “Arcan, the Gutsul’s Dance” (1957), “On Upper Reaches of Carpathians” (1959), “The Gutsul’s fair” (1970) and many others.

Shortly before the German occupation, Malynka returned to his homeland, the Yahotyn county of Kyiv Region; because of two members of the family who were sick, his family required him to stay by its side. Released from the draft due to his own illness, he worked at the local railway station. But with Nazis in town, he wasn't able to continue his work. Many intellectuals, including Malynka and his family, which completely depended on him, survived two long years under Nazis, working hard at their private vegetable patches.

One day he was imprisoned but was fortunate enough to escape from a freight train headed to Germany. When German forces were driven out of the area (fall of 1943) by the Red Army, he became enlisted in 209th battalion of the 8th Air Army and found himself on the front lines of the 2nd Ukrainian Front. Malynka's postwar life was typical for Soviet intellectuals. To make a living for his family, he painted Soviet slogans, placards, posters, etc. At any cost, he tried to be incorporated into mainstream cultural postwar process but had no luck. Meanwhile, a small-town-artist made several efforts to brush into canvas wartime memories. The picture “Babyn Yar” and several others were exhibited in Kyiv, the capital of Ukraine. Soon after, in 1949, he became a member of All-Soviet Union of Artists and, in a few years, of Kyiv Artist Society (which became later a part of All-Union Art Foundation). Those Kievans significantly influenced his style and shaped his artistry in a new way. Soon Malinka found himself at a stylistic turning point: features of socialist realism disappeared and his impressionistic style began to develop.

His best pieces entered all-Union and all-Ukraine exhibitions. At one of these exhibitions the picture “Arcan, the Gutsul’s Dance” was bought by the Ministry of Culture of Ukraine; another similar work, “On Upper Reaches of Carpathians” (1959), was taken to Australia by an art collector. It was a big achievement.

== Famous people painted ==
- Petro Konashevych-Sahaidachny - Hetman of Registered Cossacks (1616–1622)
- Bohdan Khmelnytsky - Hetman of Ukraine (1648 — 1657)
- Petro Doroshenko - 4th Hetmans of Ukrainian Cossacks (1665 – 1676)
- Ivan Mazepa - Hetman of Cossack Ukraine (ca. 1639 -1709)
- Pavlo Polubotok - Hetman of Cossack Ukraine (ca.1660 -1724)
- Kyrylo Rozumovs’kyi - Hetman of Cossack Ukraine (1728-1803)
- Taras Shevchenko - Ukrainian poet-democrat, artist, philosopher and humanist (1814-1861)
- Katheryna Bilokur - self-taught artist, National Artist of Ukraine (1900 -1961)

== Legacy ==
Mykola Malynka was one of the artists of rural origin who produced great art. His works have contributed to the international recognition of Ukrainian art.

Malynka left behind more than 300 paintings, sketches, drawings of realist and impressionist style, mostly oils and partially watercolors. Majority are displayed in museums and galleries of his homeland – Yahotyn and villages of the Yahotyn county; some are spread worldwide, including Ukraine and its capital Kyiv, as often happens with an art of a great significance.

Some of them present good educational material, such as “The Soviet Tanks T-34 Forcing Desna River at Liutizh Area” (which is a good example of dynamic painting learned and polished in Grekov Studio) or panoramic panels, on a topic of prehistoric village primitive life, which are exhibited at the Dobranichevka Archeological Museum, of Yahotyn County. Notable historical city of Pereiaslav, of Kyiv Region, has in its possession another Malinka's famous work of the same matter - “Kobzars”; reproductions of this artwork became a part of Woscob Private Art Gallery (Pennsylvania, USA) and Yahotyn Art Gallery. Some “little pearls” from landscape series – “The Summer” (1963) and “The Stalks under Snow” (1961) – are long gone to Switzerland's Zürich collection. There are also Australia, the Netherlands, and other foreign countries in the listings.

Mykola Malynka's performance in artistry and Ukrainian cultural rebirth was honored, in 1990, with a title “The Honorable Citizen of Yahotyn City”. As a tribute to Malynka's humble and highly talented personality, Ukrainian National Television Company UT-1 aired in 1993 a short biographical documentary.
