= Yustyn Pigulyak =

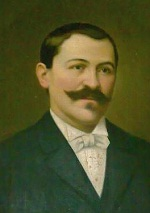
Self-portrait (1885)

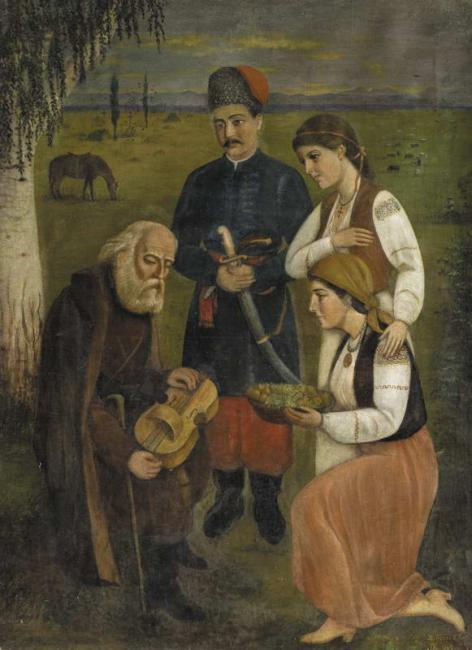
Memories of Ukraine

Yustyn Hryhorovych Pihulyak (Ukrainian: Юстин Григорович Пігуляк; 2 June 1845, Mamaivtsi, Chernivtsi Raion - 2 June 1919, Chernivtsi) was a Ukrainian painter, portraitist and public figure in Bukovina in Austria-Hungary.

== Biography ==
He was born to the family of a rural deacon. After finishing elementary school, on the advice of a teacher, his father enrolled him at a gymnasium in Chernivtsi. There, he showed an aptitude for drawing. This led to lessons at the Academy of Fine Arts, Vienna. For his senior "thesis" painting, he presented a copy of The Three Graces by Rubens, that was judged to be equal in technique to the original.

In 1874, he returned to Chernivtsi and became a drawing teacher at the German-language Realschule. He remained there until his retirement in 1906. Many of the students later recalled that he often broke the rules and spoke to them in Ukrainian.

His wages were insufficient to support a large family, so he devoted much of his personal time to painting portraits. Most of them involved wealthy foreigners, but he also took time to paint well-known Ukrainian figures.

He also participated in public and social activities. Together with his brother, Erotey, a noted writer, he was a long time member of the "Ruthenian Conversation", an educational-cultural society. For a time, he served as its treasurer. He also sang in the local Ukrainian choir.

Later, he became a member of the Bukovina Council. In 1918, he supported the movement to unite Northern Bukovina with the West Ukrainian People's Republic, rather than have it become part of Romania.

The subsequent occupation by Romania, and the persecution of his friends and family, caused his already frail health to deteriorate and he died in 1919.

His works have not fared well. In 1913, those he sent to the All-Ukrainian Art Exhibition in Kiev disappeared in transit. In 1940, many of his paintings on display at the People's House in Lviv were lost when the collection was liquidated and transferred to other institutions. A huge number were lost or destroyed during the Romanian Occupation.
