= Olha Haidamaka =

Ukrainian artist (born 1990)

- Ольга Гайдамака
- Born: 28 November 1990 (age 35); Kyiv, Ukraine
- Education: Kyiv National University of Technologies and Design
- Occupation: Artist

Olha Haidamaka (Ukrainian: Ольга Гайдамака, born 28 November 1990, Kyiv, Ukraine) is a Ukrainian artist. Laureate of the International Art Arkhip Kuindzhi Prize (2023).

== Biography ==
Olha Haidamaka was born on 28 November 1990 in Kyiv.

She studied at the Leontovych School of Arts in Kyiv. She graduated from the Kyiv National University of Technologies and Design.

== Creativity ==
In some of Olha Haidamaka's paintings, one can recognize famous Ukrainians, including: Onuka, Solomiya Krushelnytska, Olha Sumska, Bohdan Stupka, Nataliia Sumska, and Olha Freimut.

She illustrated a large amount of fiction. Her works are kept in private collections in Ukraine, Canada, and the U.S.

== Exhibitions ==
=== Solo exhibitions ===
- 2016 – Dusha Ukrainy, Taras Shevchenko Literary and Memorial House-Museum, Kyiv;
- 2018 – Dukhovnyi spadok, Art Hall of the Institute of Philology of Taras Shevchenko National University of Kyiv, Kyiv;
- 2019 – Dukhovnyi spadok, Art Space "Derevo zhyttia", Kyiv;
- 2019 – Shliakh do ridnoho, Obukhiv Folk Art Center, Obukhiv;
- 2020 – Embassy of the United States, Kyiv;
- 2020 – Shliakh do ridnoho, Boryspil State Historical Museum, Boryspil;
- 2021 – National Bank of Ukraine, Kyiv;
- 2022 – Osonnia, Chernihiv Regional Art Museum named after Hryhorii Halahan, Chernihiv;
- 2023 – Kvituvannia, Art Gallery, Kyiv;
- 2023 – Kvituvannia, Space4 business center, Rivne.

=== Group exhibitions ===
In 2015–2023, she participated in group exhibitions.
