= Igor Gubskiy =

Ukrainian artist (1954–2022)

- Ігор Губський
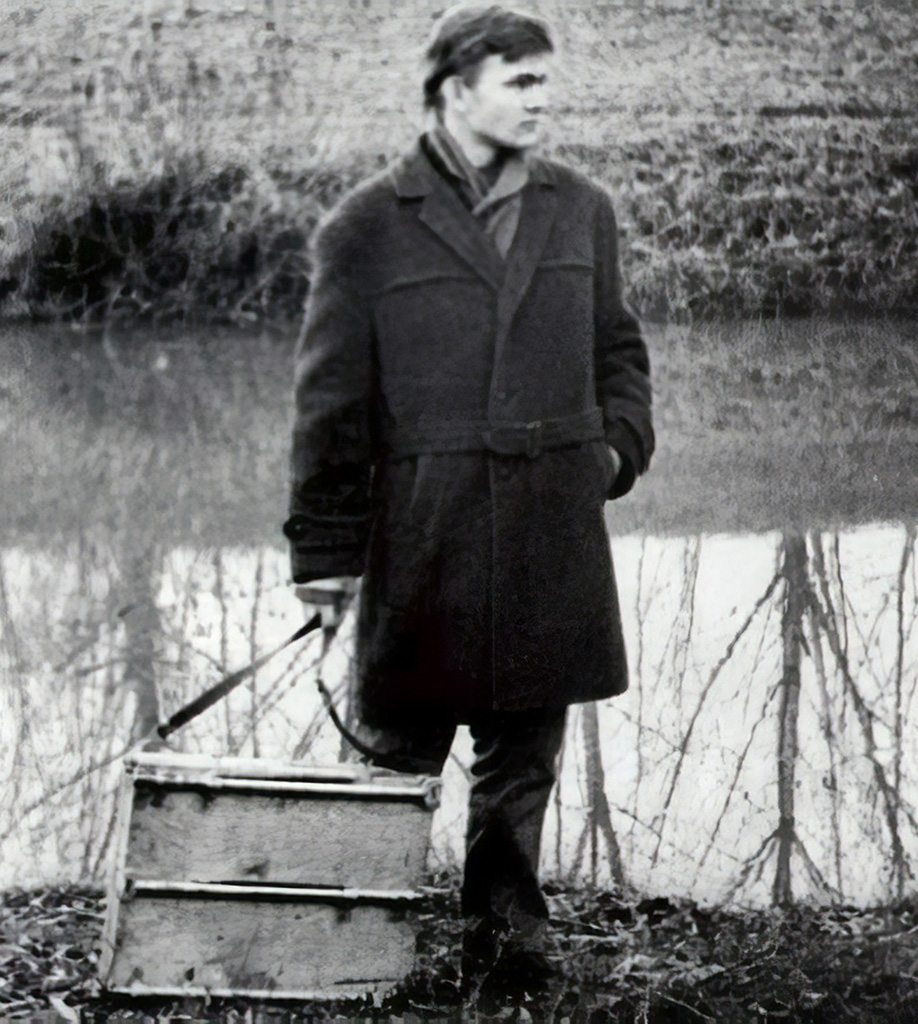
- Gubsky in 1976
- Born: 11 July 1954; Kadiivka, Voroshilovgradskaya Region, Ukrainian SSR
- Died: 8 February 2022 (aged 67)
- Education: Kyiv State Art Institute, faculty of painting (1973–1979)
- Known for: Painting
- Notable work: "Art and life" 1985"The watchman" 1987
- Style: Realism, Modernism
- Website: www.igubskiy.com

Igor Gubskiy (11 June 1954 – 8 February 2022) was a Ukrainian artist, rated 4A in the United Art Rating with individual style and relevant price recommendation. Gubskiy is one of the few artists noted by State Tretyakov Gallery, as a bright representative of the Ukrainian school of the 20th century, together with Tatyana Yablonskaya and Andriy Kotska. State Tretyakov Gallery, Moscow, Russian Federation.

Gubskiy's works are held in the National Art Museum of Ukraine, State Tretyakov Gallery (Moscow, Russian Federation), Malmö Art Museum (Sweden), Gorlovka Art Museum, Sumy Art Museum, Lugansk Art Museum, and private collections in Ukraine, Britain, Canada, Germany, Israel, The Netherlands, Sweden and the United States (New York City and Chicago).

== Early period ==

Igor Gubskiy was born on June 11, 1954, in the small town of Kadiivka, Voroshilovgradskaya Region. His father, Ivan Gubskiy, was an artist, and his mother, Lyudmila Gubskaya, was a housewife. He spent his childhood in Kadievka, and later moved with his parents to Voroshilovgrad.

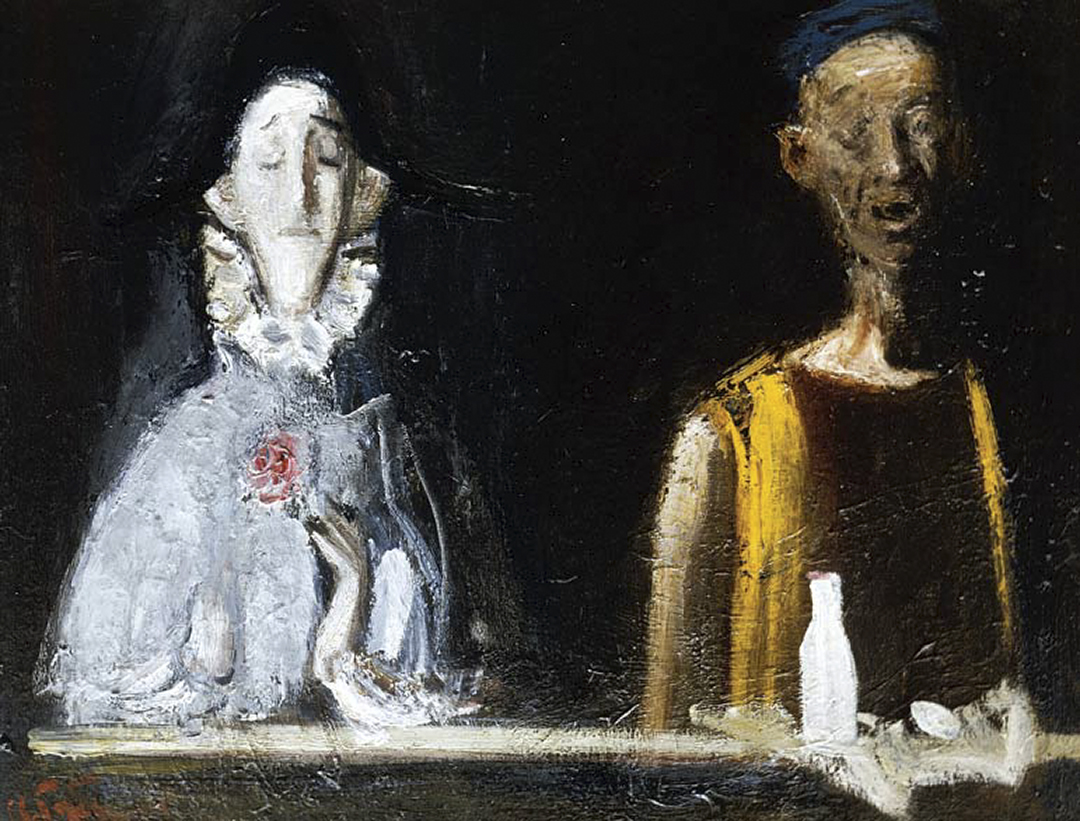
Art and life, 1985, Oil on Canvas. Christie's in 1990.

Beginning in 1969, Gubsky studied art in Voroshilovgrad Art School; he graduated with honors in 1973 and received a specialty of art and drafting teacher.

In 1973, after graduating from the Art School, he enrolled in Kyiv State Art Institute, faculty of painting. After the second course, Gubskiy studied in Victor Puzyrkov's workshop.

In 1981, after military service, Gubskiy studied in Sergei Grigoriev's workshop for three years.

The artist participated at Christie's, Phillips, and his artworks "Art and Life" (1985), "Urgent order" (1987), "Nap between battles" and many others were sold out at auctions.

=== Chronology ===
1974 – started to take part in local, national and all-union exhibitions
1987 – awarded honorary diploma of the academy of Arts of the USSR
1987 – started to be exhibited internationally (Sweden, Syria, Norway, (Germany), Japan, etc.)
1988 – the artwork "Rebellion" was bought by the National Art Museum of Ukraine
1990 – solo exhibition in Malmö, Sweden. All 22 artworks were sold out, one of 22 represented artworks was bought by State Malmö Art Museum.
1990 – participation in Christie's auction (all works were sold out).
1990 – participation in the Phillips's auction (all works were sold out).
1991 – the artwork "Watchman" was bought by State Tretyakov Art Gallery, Moscow.
1994 – exhibition in Ukraine National Museum of History, Kyiv, Ukraine.
Starting from 1999 – a permanent exhibition in "Yana" Gallery, Kyiv, Ukraine.

== Period of stagnation and returning ==
Since 1994, Gubskiy has painted infrequently due to personal reasons. He began to paint again starting in 2008. The first significant artwork Gubskiy painted after such a long period of stagnation was "The Old Woman". It took almost a year to complete this work. The artist started to paint efficiently. During this period, "Harlequins" and "Jews" become the key series of his artworks. The paintings of that period were regularly sold out by private collectors at Ukrainian auctions.

=== Chronology ===
2004 – was excluded from National Union of Ukrainian Artists
2008 – solo exhibition in "Tadzio Gallery", Kyiv, Ukraine
2009 – solo exhibition in "Persona Gallery", Kyiv, Ukraine
2009 – solo exhibition in International Art Fair IV "Art-Kyiv 2009"
2010 – solo exhibition "The Women" in Art Fair "Interior Art", Museum of Spiritual Treasures of Ukraine[uk].
2010 – solo exhibition "The City" in International Art Fair "Fine Art Ukraine 2010"
2011 – solo exhibition in Moscow Art Fair XVI "ART MANEGE 2011", Central Exhibition Hall Manege, Moscow, Russian Federation
2011 – 2013 – solo exhibition in Art Forum "Fine Art Ukraine", Mystetskyi Arsenal, Kyiv, Ukraine
2011 – exhibition in Moscow International Art Salon XVI CHA-2011. The Artist. The City"
2012 – exhibition in Moscow International Art Salon XVII "CHA-2012. The Roads "
2013 – exhibition in Moscow International Art Salon XVIII "CHA-2013. The Process "
2014 – exhibition in Moscow International Art Salon XIV "CHA-2014. The Connection of Times"
2014 – solo exhibition in Fine Art Gallery "Manufacture", Kyiv, Ukraine
2016 – exhibition in Lera Litvinova Gallery.

== Expert assessments ==
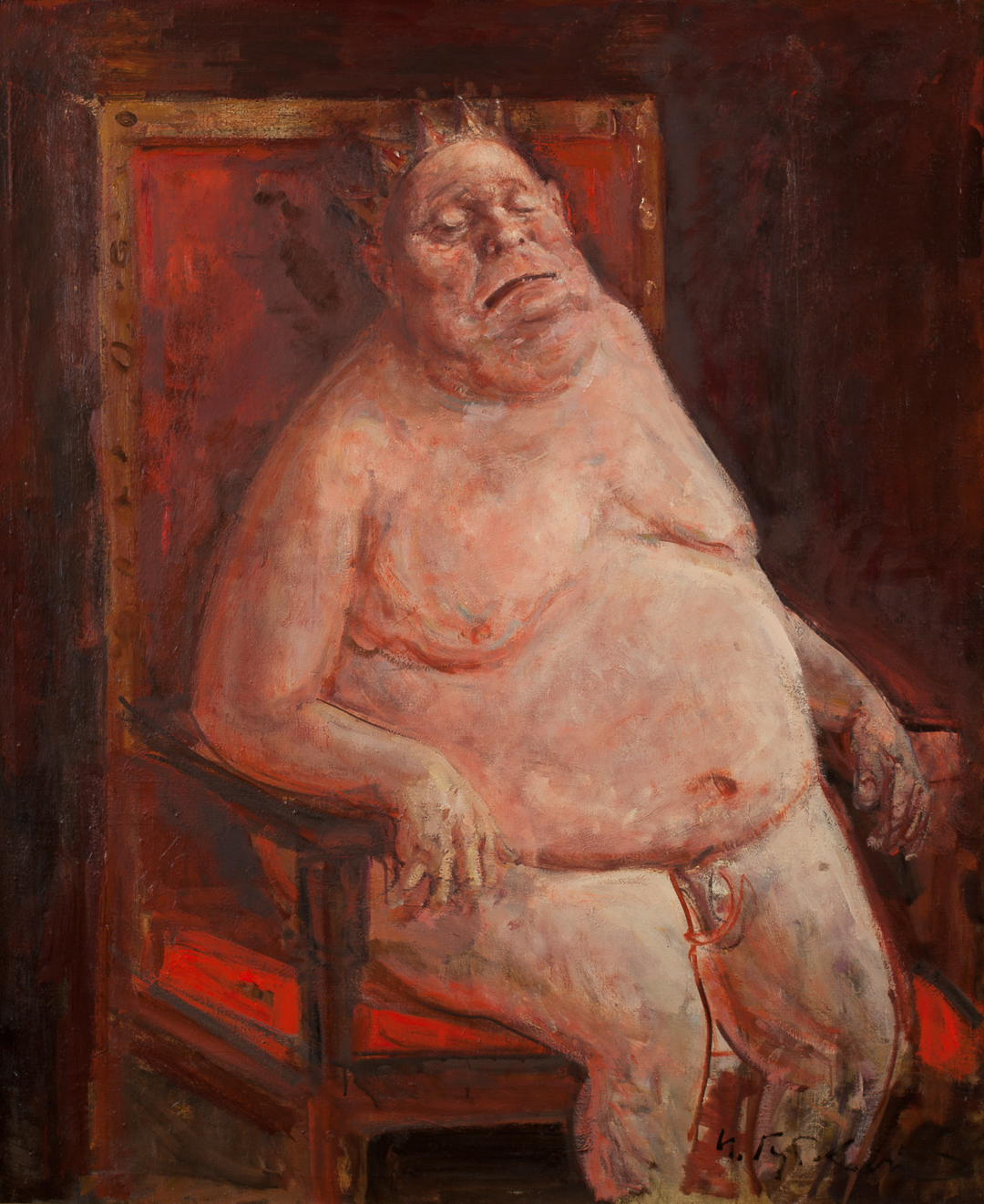
Saddled with Power, 2014, Oil on Canvas

The large part of Gubskiy's artworks is portraits. To this genre, the artist remains paradoxical faithful in modern times. The style of his artworks continues the traditions of the psychological portrait of classical and pre-avant-garde art. The artistic and technical practices of Gubskiy's works are reminiscent of the picturesque world of Diego Velázquez's paintings, the expressive world of Francisco Goya's paintings, and the dramatic world of Rembrandt's paintings. Gubskiy thoughtfully transforms the technical findings and techniques of Nikolay Feshin and Corneliu Baba in his artworks.

The art historian Roman Zvinyatskovskiy about the works that were represented at the exhibition in Malmö:

The people in Igor Gubskiy portraits are not fantastic figures. They are examples of ordinary people, maybe a little bit strange, from the artist's childhood, that made the strongest impressions on him. The artist often selects his motives from the so-called society of the lower strata, where he finds universal human and aesthetic values. Igor Gubsky does not seek to emphasize this in his paintings deliberately, but nevertheless, the result is evident. For me, Igor Gubskiy's art is "aristocratic democracy". This term, of course, contains two words that are opposites of each other, but this contrary characterizes the artist's art in the best way.

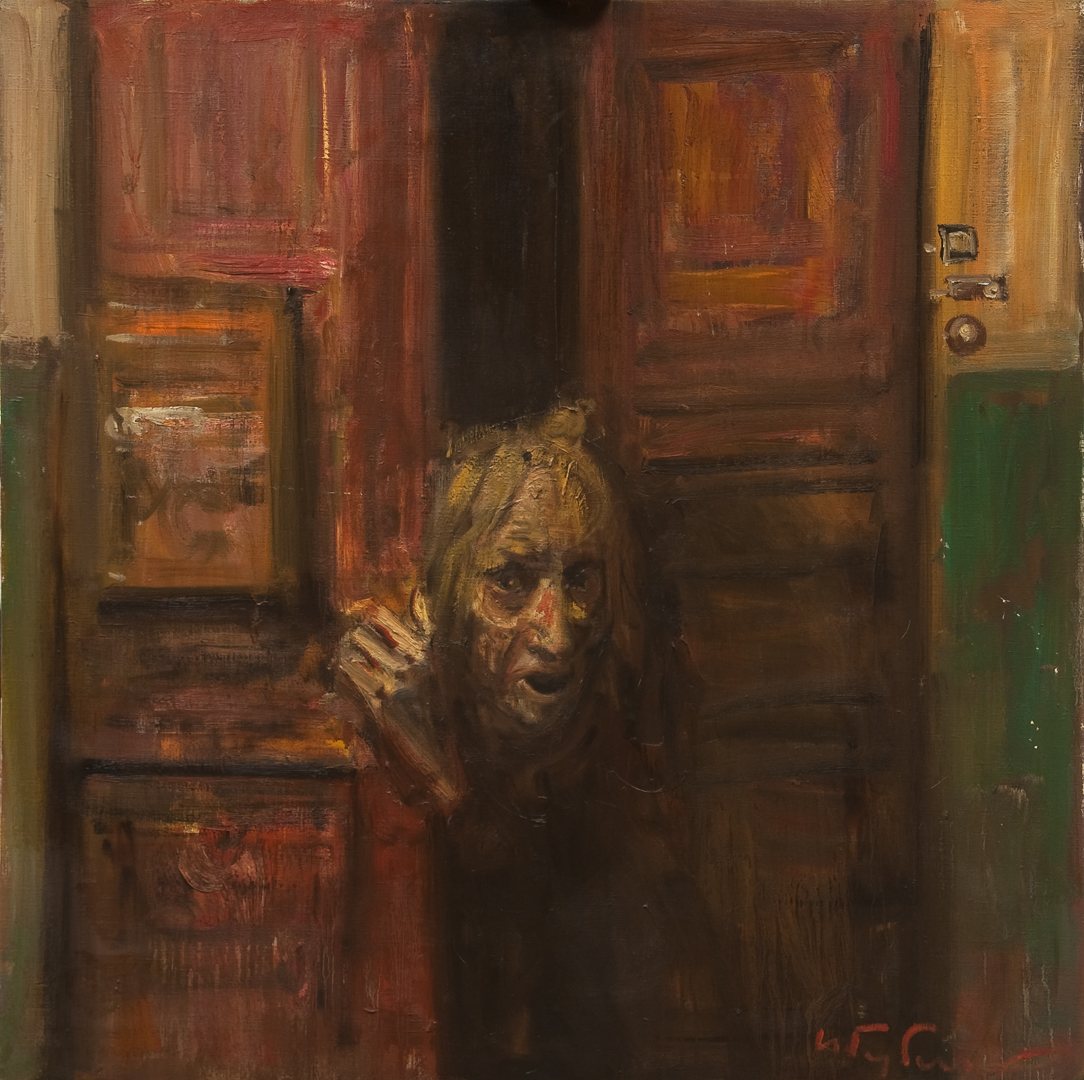
Who's there? 2009, 100 cm х 100 cm, Oil on Canvas

Ukrainian art critic Olesya Avramenko wrote:

Igor Gubskiy is an artist with a steady hand and a precise eye, who brings life to his paintings with a few dynamic strokes. His works are full of life and trembling. He is the genius master who can brilliantly translate natural impressions into sharp, expressive, recognizable images. The artist skillfully and effortlessly knows how to create ordinary but vividly expressive images, which is an unprecedented thing even for notorious realist painters.

== Personal life and death ==
Gubskiy died on 8 February 2022, at the age of 67.
