= Victor Deysun =

Ukrainian abstract expressionist painter

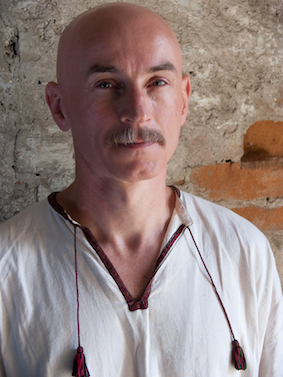
- Born: July 22, 1962; Kamianets-Podilskyi, Ukrainian Soviet Socialist Republic, Soviet Union
- Known for: Painting
- Movement: Abstract expressionism
- Website: https://viktordeisun.com

Victor Mykolayovych Deysun (born 22 July 1962 in Kamianets-Podilskyi, Ukrainian Soviet Socialist Republic) is a Ukrainian abstract expressionist painter.

== Early life and education ==
Deysun was born on July 22, 1962, in the city of Kamianets-Podilskyi.

== Artistic career ==
Deysun graduated from Kyiv State School of Arts and later from Lviv Academy of Arts. His teachers included Arkadiy Milkovitsky, Volodymyr Cherkasov, Peter Kravchenko, Yuriy Fedorovych Yurchik. He is a member of the National Union of Artists of Ukraine. He is also a member of the BJ-Art artistic group. His paintings are kept in the private collections in Ukraine, Russia, Poland, Hungary, Germany, Canada, United States, Israel, France, Great Britain, China, and in museum collections such as the Lviv National Museum, Poltava Museum of Local Lore, Krementchuk Museum of Local Lore, Kamianets-Podilskyi art gallery. His works are sold at auction Phillips.

== Main one-man exhibitions ==
- 2014 – "Drawings on the fence", Mystetska Zbirka art gallery, Kyiv, Ukraine
- 2013 – "Red and Black", painting, installation, Mystetska Zbirka art gallery, Kyiv, Ukraine
- 2013 – Viktor Deysun, Carlos Garcia Laos, Museum of Modern Art of Ukraine, "Fragmentation", Kyiv, Ukraine
- 2012 – Kunstamt Art Gallery, Tübingen, Germany
- 2012 – "Hogging Off a Tiger", painting, Mystetska Zbirka art gallery, Kyiv, Ukraine
- 2011 – "Optimalism", painting, Mystetska Zbirka art gallery, Kyiv, Ukraine
- 2010 – Kamianets Podilskiy art gallery, Kamianets Podilskiy, Ukraine
- 2008 – Gryfon art gallery, Kyiv, Ukraine
- 2007 – Gallery "36", Kyiv, Ukraine
- 2006 – Coffee shop Antresol, Kyiv, Ukraine
- 2002 – Gryfon art gallery, Kyiv, Ukraine
- 2002 – Dialog art club, Odesa, Ukraine
- 2001 – Kavaleridze museum-workshop gallery, Kyiv, Ukraine
- 1998 – Solo exhibition of paintings, Local lore museum, Kremenchuk, Ukraine
- 1994 – Gallery of the Slavutych arts center, Kyiv, Ukraine
- 1993 – Solo exhibition of paintings and installation, Exhibition hall of the Union of Artists of Ukraine, Kremenchuk, Ukraine
- 1992 – Lviv National Museum, Lviv, Ukraine

== Group exhibitions ==
- 2015 – Group exhibition "MAKE ART NOT WAR", Mystetska Zbirka art gallery, Kyiv, Ukraine
- 2015 – Ukrainian Fashion Week
- 2014 – Group exhibition "Ukraine. Archetype of freedom", Novomatic Forum, Vienna, Austria
- 2013 – Auction exhibition, 10.12.13, Under the influence, Auction House Phillips, London, Great Britain
- 2013 – IX Art Kyiv Contemporary, "Warm up Ukraine", Mystetsky Arsenal, Kyiv, Ukraine
- 2013 – Arts and crafts exhibition, expocenter, city of Changchun, Province Jilin, China
- 2013 – "Winter-tide" group exhibition, Mystetska Zbirka art gallery, Kyiv, Ukraine
- 2012 – "Cities of the World" group exhibition, Mystetska Zbirka art gallery, Kyiv, Ukraine
- 2011 – Fine Art Ukraine, Mystetsky Arsenal, Kyiv, Ukraine
- 2010 – Pre-show exhibition, the Auction House "Epoch", Kyiv, Ukraine
- 2010 – Gogolfest, Dovzhenko Film Studios, Kyiv, Ukraine
- 2006 – "World of Primer" exhibition, National museum, Lviv, Ukraine
- 2003 – Tokai gallery, city of Tokai, Hungary
- 2001 – Tendenz art Galerie, Paderborn, Germany
- 2001 – Project-01 "Spring Wind", open air, Poskotyna hill, city of Kyiv, Ukraine
- 2001 – Picturesque Ukraine-2001, Union of the Artists of Ukraine, city of Kyiv, Ukraine
- 2000 – Autumn salon – Vysoky Zamok-2000, city of Lviv, Ukraine
- 2000 – 2000 years under the star of Bethlehem, city of Odesa, Ukraine
- 1999 – V International art festival, city of Kyiv, Ukraine
- 1995 – Pan-Ukraine-95, city of Dnipropetrovsk, Ukraine
- 1990 – "Impreza", International exhibition, city of Ivano-Frankivsk, Ukraine
- 1997 – Autumn salon-97, Union of the Artists of Ukraine, city of Kyiv, Ukraine
- 1995 – Picturesque Ukraine- 95, Union of the Artists of Ukraine, city of Kyiv, Ukraine
- 1994 – Spring Exhibition −94, Union of the Artists of Ukraine, city of Kyiv, Ukraine
- 1993 – "Flowers of Hope", Union of the Artists of Ukraine, city of Kyiv, Ukraine
