= Zinaida Viktorzhevska =

Ukrainian painter (1905–1985)

- Зінаїда Вікторжевська
- Born: Зінаїда Власівна Вікторжевська; Zinaida Vlasivna Viktorzhevska; 7 January 1905 [O.S. 25 December 1904] Kamianets-Podilskyi, Podolia Governorate, Russian Empire
- Died: 8 November 1985 (aged 80); Kyiv, Ukrainian SSR, USSR
- Education: Kyiv Art Institute, 1930
- Occupations: Artist; painter

Zinaida Vlasivna Viktorzhevska (Ukrainian: Зінаїда Власівна Вікторжевська; 7 January 1905 [O.S. 25 December 1904] – 8 November 1985) was a Ukrainian and Soviet artist, painter and member of the Union of Soviet Artists of Ukraine.

== Biography ==
Viktorzhevska was born on 7 January 1905 [O.S. 25 December 1904] in Kamianets-Podilskyi, Podolia Governorate (present-day Kamianets-Podilskyi Raion, Ukraine).

From 1923 to 1924 Viktorzhevska worked at the Berezil Theatre 4th theater workshop. In 1929, Viktorzhevska was an artist at a dolomite processing plant in Artemivsk (present-day Bakhmut).

In 1930, Viktorzhevska graduated from the Kyiv Art Institute where she studied under Fedir Krychevsky. Following graduation Viktorzhevska briefly worked as a teacher at the Luhansk labor school.

From 1930 to 1933, Viktorzhevska worked as a director and animator at the Kyiv Film Factory (Ukrainian: Київської кінофабрики) animation workshop.

On 8 November 1985 Viktorzhevska died in Kyiv, Ukrainian SSR (now Ukraine) aged 80.

== Legacy ==
A posthumous solo show of Viktorzhevska's work was held in 2003 at the Taras Shevchenko National Museum.
