= Andriy Kotska =

Andriy Andriyovich Kotska
- Born: 23 May 1911; Ungvár, Kingdom of Hungary, Austria-Hungary
- Died: 3 September 1987 (aged 76); Uzhhorod, Ukrainian SSR, Soviet Union
- Citizenship: Czechoslovakia; USSR
- Style: Oil painting

Andriy Andriyovich Kotska (Russian: Andrey Andreyevich Kotska; 23 May 1911 – 3 September 1987) was a Ukrainian Soviet painter. He was honored Art Worker of the Ukrainian SSR (1971) and People's Artist of the Ukrainian SSR (1982).

== Biography ==
In 1931 he graduated from the public drawing school in Uzhgorod. He was a pupil of Adalbert Erdeli and Iosif Bokshay.

He continued his studies at the department of monumental painting at the Academy of Fine Arts in Rome, from which he graduated in 1942.

He was a member of the Union of Artists of Ukraine since 1946. Since 1977 he was Member of the Board of the Union of Artists of the USSR and a member of the Presidium of the Board of the Union of Artists of the Ukrainian SSR.

Participated in art exhibitions since 1932. The most resonant exhibitions are in Moscow (1964), Uzhhorod (1981), solo in Moscow (1983), solo in Trebišov (Czechoslovakia, 1984).

He died in 1987 in Uzhhorod.

== Creative life ==
The works of A. Kotska are original in style and are distinguished by impeccable coloring. His style is easily recognizable. A kind of visiting card of the artist is a series of female portraits "Gutsulok" and "Verkhovinka".

In Kotska's landscapes, the world becomes orderly and organized. The tops of the mountains round out and become like waves merging with a distant land. The houses stand on the slopes of the mountains in such a way that it seems: not by the will of the artist, but by man, the order of their placement was established on the ground. "Spring in the Ashes" (1966) is a small lyrical picture. where a certain muted color is organically combined with various bright colors. A small mountain village has already met spring, gardens have blossomed, the earth is covered with greenery. Even the mountains, depicted in barely lilac and blue-pink colors, have become spring. Either from the sun's rays, or from the vegetation that has blossomed. The leitmotif of the picture is everything blooms and is reborn. Another picture of the artist, "Landscape" (1970) – with red and copper roofs of houses, blue mountain peaks, white snow and yurba of people who apparently went out on Sunday to take a break from hard work. The cycle of life, the movement of air, people, nature - all this creates a unique flavor, emphasized by the realism of the image.

During 2006–2007 several of his works were stolen from museums and private collections. The value of the master's work is also evidenced by the fact that from year to year the prices for his paintings are growing at a rapid pace. Only in the last 2–3 years they have increased by more than 100%, reaching tens of thousands of hryvnias.

== Legacy ==
- The memorial museum in Uzhhorod is named after him.
- In Uzhhorod, on the house where the artist lived, there is a memorial plaque in honor of the painter.

== Selected works ==
- 1930 - Fair, Mariyka, Schoolchildren, Khlopchik;
- 1930s - "Winter in the village of Tikha", "Uzhhorod", "Perechin Bazaar", "Dodom", "Proceedings";
- 1933 — “Winter. A week in the village of Tikha”, “Days”;
- 1935 - "Verkhovintsi", "Portrait of a girl from the village of Tikhiy";
- 1937 - "The White of the Church";
- 1939 - "At the village", "For the call";
- 1940 - "Still life with lobster";
- 1944 - "Portrait of a girl";
- 1948 - "Tetyana Yablonska";
- 1951 - "Marichka", "Slovak girl", "Old Kolgospnik", "Portrait of a Woman";
- 1952 - "Girl from Kolochavi";
- 1956 - "Verkhovinka", "Church in the village. Uzhok”, “Hirsk panorama”;
- 1958 - "Polonina Rognieska";
- 1960 - "Hutsul's Autumn", "Mother", "Narechen", "Girlfriends", "Synevyrske Lake", "Osinnі Farbi";
- 1960s - "Osinniy lis";
- 1966 - "Smaragdova Spring";
- 1967 - "Spring", "Hutsulks from the village of Bogdan";
- 1968 - "Named";
- 1969 - "Chabani";
- 1970 - “Girlfriends”, “Hutsulskaya is named”, “In the Hutsulshchyna”;
- 1970s - "Verkhovyna in Red Khustin", "Holy in Verkhovyna";
- 1973 - "Winter";
- 1974 - "Lisorub I. Plesha";
- 1976 - "Vesnyanka";
- 1979 - "At the Carpathians";
- 1980s - "Tulips in the garden."

== Literature ==
- Biksei L. An ideal realized through an image. 95th anniversary of the birth of A. Kotsky (Ukrainian)
- Myshanych, V. Andrii Kotsky's 95th birthday was celebrated in his museum [Text] / V. Myshanych // Uzhhorod. — 2006. — May 27 — P. 12. (Ukrainian)
