= Kostyantyn Markovych =

Ukrainian painter, iconographer, graphic artist (born 1968)

- Костянтин Петрович Маркович
- Born: 20 September 1968 (age 57); Lviv
- Education: Ivan Trush Lviv School of Applied and Decorative Arts, Lviv Institute of Applied and Decorative Arts
- Occupations: Painter; iconographer; graphic artist
- Awards: Merited Artist of Ukraine; Sviatoslav Hordynskyi Prize

Kostyantyn Markovych or Kostiantyn Markovych, Kost’ Markovych, Kostko Markovych (Ukrainian: Костянтин Петрович Маркович; born 20 September 1968) is a Ukrainian painter, iconographer, graphic artist. Son of the famous graphic artist Petro Markovych. On his mother's side, Vira is the grandson of the Patriarch of the Ukrainian Autocephalous Orthodox Church Dymytrii (Volodymyr Yarema). Member of the National Union of Artists of Ukraine (1999), Ukrainian Union of Icon Painters (2012). Merited Artist of Ukraine (2016).

== Biography ==
Kostyantyn Markovych was born on 20 September 1968 in Lviv.

In 1987, he graduated from the Ivan Trush Lviv School of Applied and Decorative Arts, and in 1993 from the Lviv Institute of Applied and Decorative Arts (teachers: Yevhen Lysyk, Karlo Zvirynskyi, Volodymyr Ovsiichuk, Serhii Babkov).

From 1993, he worked as a lecturer at the Department of Drawing and Art Painting at the Ivan Trush Lviv College of Decorative and Applied Arts. From 1998 to the present day, he has been working at the Department of Sacred Art at the Lviv National Academy of Arts: from 2005, he was a private docent, and from 2018, he became an docent.

== Works ==
He works mainly in the genre of sacred art, creating in such techniques as icon painting, mural painting, mosaic, and sgraffito. He is the leader of the iconographic group "Favor", with which he has been implementing the developed projects of temple polychromy from 1996. He worked in many (more than 20) churches in Ukraine, Romania, Poland, Slovakia, and Canada. He participated in many international plein airs of icon painting, in particular, during 2010–2024 he took part in the International plein air of icon painting in Nowica (Polish: Międzynarodowe warsztaty ikonopisów w Nowicy). Other creative interests: pastels, book graphics, fonts.

Author of several personal exhibitions in Lviv, Kyiv, and other cities of Ukraine.

Kost Markovych has a deep understanding of the centuries-old traditions of sacred art. He adheres to the established rules of ancient Byzantine-Rus' iconography, but at the same time adds his own creative vision and original interpretation to his compositions. His style is characterized by austerity, purity, and the sublime, transcendent sound of the images. Although Markovych's icons retain their spiritual, aesthetic, and formal tradition, they are also contemporary works. They are characterized by a non-standard interpretation of canonical subjects. Markovych often adds quotes from the Holy Scriptures to his images, skillfully written in Cyrillic scripts. The execution of these inscriptions testifies to his high professionalism: sophisticated graphics and well-chosen text enrich the compositional and rhythmic structure of the icon and significantly deepen its spiritual content. The artist thoughtfully uses the Christian symbolism of colors, avoiding sharp contrasts. His colors are subtly harmonized and subordinated to the content of the work.

In addition, Markovych works scientifically, researching the iconography of church wall paintings, Ukrainian iconography of the 15th-17th centuries. In 2020, he wrote the textbook "Kompozytsiia ikony, Syntez zmistu i formy" (co-authored with Taras Lesiv). He compiled and published a two-volume monograph of his grandfather, Patriarch Dymytrii, "Ikonopys Zakhidnoi Ukrainy XVI — poch. XVII st." (for which he received the Sviatoslav Hordynskyi Prize of the Lviv Regional State Administration in 2018).

Among the important works:

- The Icon of the Incarnation in the courtyard of the Dormition Church in Lviv (1994);
- Series of paintings on glass "The Passion of Christ" (1995–1997);
- Icons for the iconostasis, a cycle of hanging compositions and polychromy of the Church of the Nativity of the Virgin Mary in Stebnyk, Drohobych Raion (1995–1999, group "Favor")
- Iconographic cycle "Nativity" (1999–2000);
- Icons – "Holy Ukrainian New Martyrs" (1998), "Holy Martyr Mercury", "Holy Martyr Panteleimon" (1999, both in the Assumption Church of Lviv);
- Paintings of Ukrainian churches in Romania: The Exaltation of the Holy Cross in Sighetu Marmației, 1996–1997; St. Volodymyr in Lugoj, 2001–2004; Saints Peter and Paul in Krasna. Krasna village, 2002-2006 (group "Favor");
- The mosaic icon of the Mother of God Odyhytria (2000, St. Volodymyr's Church in Vynnyky);
- Polychrome of the St. Volodymyr and St. Olha church in Lviv (designed by architect Myron Vendzylovych), 2002–2011 (group "Favor");
- Icons for the iconostasis of the [[|Intercession Cathedral, Rivne]] in Rivne (2005–2006, "Favor" group)
- Design and artistic supervision of the mosaic triptych for the facade of the Ukrainian Church of the Intercession of the Virgin Mary (Melbourne, Australia, 2008);
- Polychrome of the Church of St. Andrew the Apostle in Khoruzhivka, Sumy Oblast (2007–2009, group "Favor");
- The Throne Icon "Laying of the Robe of the Virgin Mary" (monastery on the Holy Mountain, Zolochiv Raion, Lviv Oblast, 2009);
- Polychrome of the Church of St. Volodymyr in Novyi Rozdil (2010-2012; group "Favor");
- Iconographic cycle "Way of the Cross" and polychrome of the Church of St. Paraskeva in Shevchenkove, Ivano-Frankivsk Oblast, 2014-2019);
- Painting of the Church of St. Elijah in Yelykhovychi, Zolochiv Raion, Lviv Oblast (2011–2020, group "Favor");
- Painting of the Church of the Transfer of the Relics of St. Nicholas (Rzeszów, Poland, 2013-2014, group "Favor");
- Facade decoration of the Church of St. Michael the Archangel, Pidhorodnie, Zolochiv Raion, using the sgraffito technique (2016–2019, group "Favor");
- Icons for the iconostasis of the Church of the Holy Martyrs Vera, Hope, Love and Sophia in Zolochiv (2020);
- Project of the iconostasis, mosaic compositions and execution of icons for the Church of the Cathedral of the Virgin Mary of the Monastery of Fr. Basilians in Briukhovychi, Lviv Oblast (2018-2023);
- Icons for the iconostasis and painting of the sanctuary of St. Joseph's Church in Oakville, Ontario, Canada (2022–2024).

== Awards ==
- Merited Artist of Ukraine (1 December 2016);
- Sviatoslav Hordynskyi Prize (2018).

== Bibliography ==
- Markovych Kostiantyn Petrovych / V. P. Badiak, L. V. Voloshyn // Encyclopedia of Modern Ukraine [Online] / Eds. : I. М. Dziuba, A. I. Zhukovsky, M. H. Zhelezniak [et al.] ; National Academy of Sciences of Ukraine, Shevchenko Scientific Society. – Kyiv : The NASU institute of Encyclopedic Research, 2018.
- Овсійчук В. Страсний цикл Костя Марковича // Успенська вежа. — 1997. — Ч. 6.
- Волошин Л. Інтерпретація традицій сакрального мистецтва у творчості Костя Марковича // Вісник Львівської національної академії мистецтв. — 2012. — Вип. 23. — С. 272—279.
- Волошин Л. Вдумлива інтерпретація традицій сакрального мистецтва у творчості Костя Марковича // Описане слово. Сакрал. малярство К. Марковича: Альбом. — Л., 2012. — 52 с.
- Жижкович В. Стінопис сучасних українських церков Румунії // Вісник Львівської академії мистецтв. — 2014. — Вип. 15.
- "Кость Маркович". Львівська національна академія мистецтв.
