= Mykhaylo Khmelko =

Russian painter

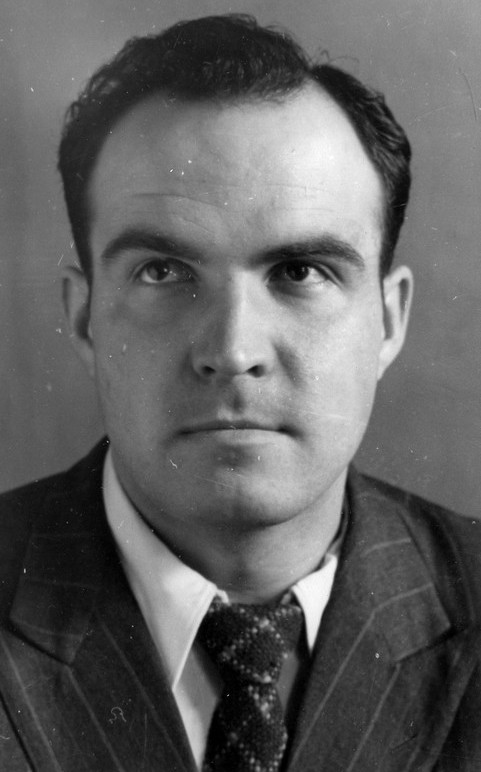
Image of Мykhailo Khmelko

Mykhailo Ivanovych Khmelko (Ukrainian: Михайло Іванович Хмелько, 23 October 1919 - 15 January 1996) was a Ukrainian painter, People's Artist of the Ukrainian SSR, and double Stalin prize winner.

== Biography ==
Mykhailo Khmelko was born in Kyiv. In 1943-1946, he studied at the Kyiv State Art Institute under Karp Trokhimenko. In 1948-1973, he was a faculty of the same institute.

Khmelko is known for his Socialist Realism paintings: Unification of the Ukrainian Lands (1939-1949), Drink A Toast for the Great Russian People (1947), Triumph of the Victorious Motherland (1949), Forever with Moscow. Forever with Russian people (1951). He is also the author of the diorama Medical Help in the Bohdan Khmelnytsky army of the Kyiv Museum of Medicine.

In the 1970s, he began to abuse alcohol, which led to his dismissal from the art institute. In 1986, he began working on his autobiography, but it remained a draft. With the beginning of perestroika, the demand for the artist's paintings of party and military figures disappeared, the artist was hardly experiencing the collapse of the USSR, and family problems began. This, as well as alcohol abuse, led to Khmelko's death on January 15, 1996, after a long illness.

Mikhail Khmelko. Forever with Moscow. Forever with the Russian People (Treaty of Pereyaslav). 1951

== Sources ==
- Mikhail Ivanovich Khmelko Kievskiye Vedomosti N73, 6 April 2007 (in Russian)
- M. Khmelko in Russian history in the mirror of visual arts (in Russian)
- Passion to Find and Give Zerkalo Nedeli N39 (260) 2 October 1999 (in Russian)
