= Russia Germans =

Russian Germans

- Flag of Russia Germans

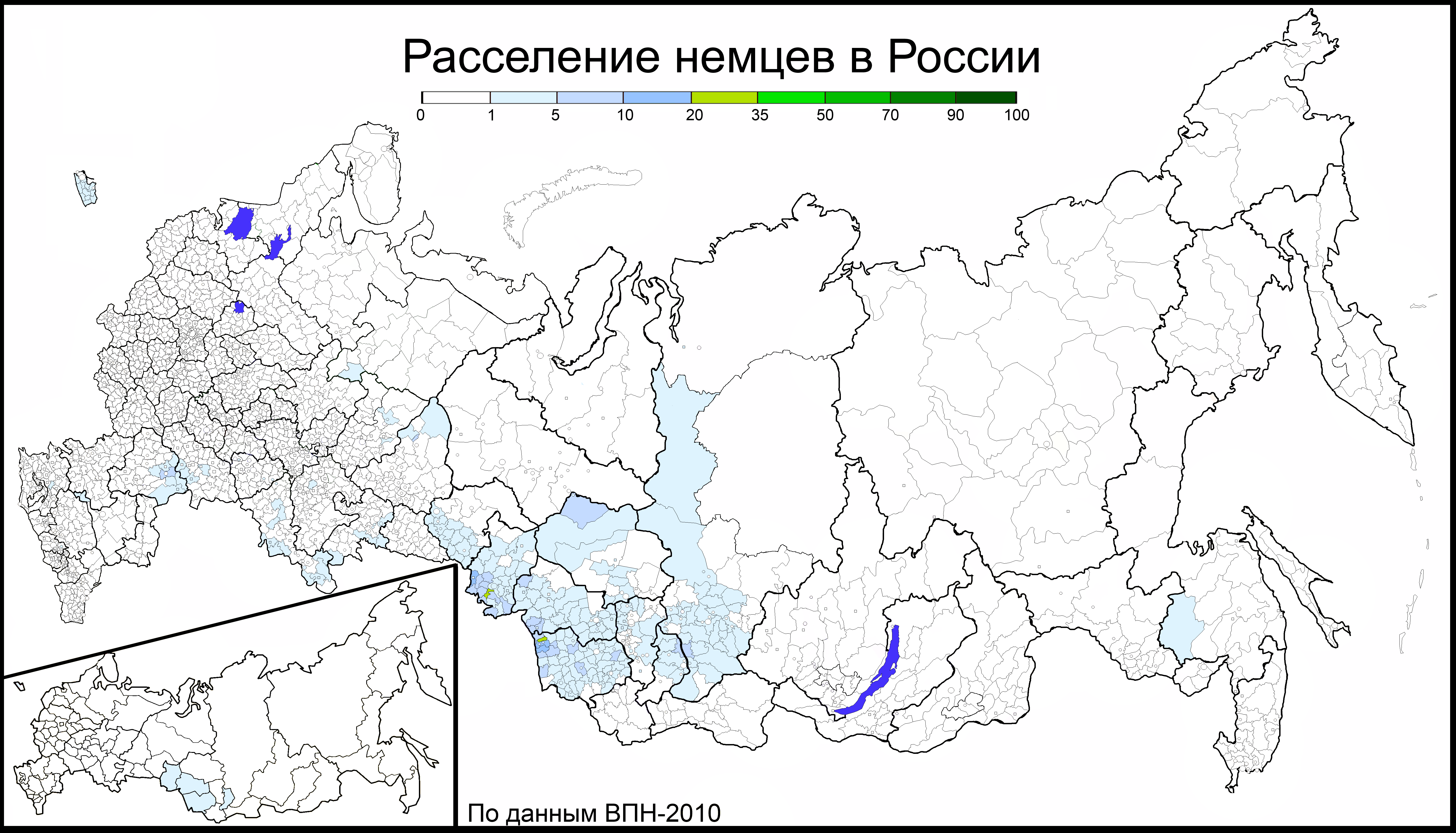
- Map of the distribution of Russia Germans in Russia in 2010

Regions with significant populations
- Russia: 394 000 (2010)
- Russian Soviet Federative Socialist Republic: 842 000 (1989)
- Union of Soviet Socialist Republics: 2 039 000 (1989)

Languages
- German, Russian, Mennonite Low German, Swabian German

Religion
- historically Protestant and Catholic, also and currently more Eastern Orthodox

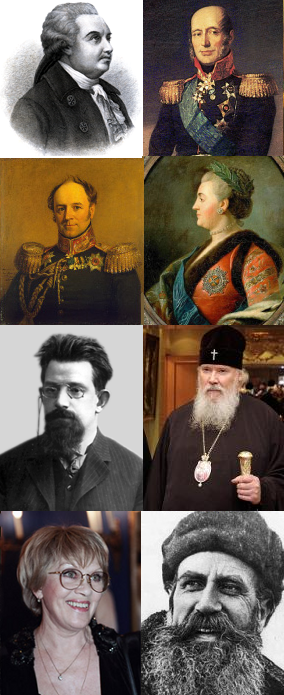
Famous Russian Germans: Denis Fonwisin, Michael de Tolly Alexander von Benckendorff, Catherine the Great, Peter Struve, Patriarch Alexei II Alisa Freindlich, Otto Schmidt

Russia Germans or Germans from Russia (German: Russlanddeutsche, literally "Russia Germans"; Russian: российские немцы, romanized: rossiyskiye nemtsy or русские немцы, literally "Russian Germans") are ethnic Germans or their descendants who were born in Russia or in the Soviet Union. The term Russlanddeutsche – literally "Russia Germans" in German – is often mistranslated as "Russian-Germans."

After the dissolution of the Soviet Union, many Russia Germans immigrated to Germany, benefiting from the German law that recognizes citizenship to ethnic Germans who arrived in the territory as late ethnic Germans resettlers (German: Spätaussiedler).

== Terminology ==
Russia Germans can receive a more specific name according to where and when they settled. For example, an ethnic German born in a village in Odesa is a Ukraine German, a Black Sea German and a Russia German (the former Russian Empire). Alternatively, the Germans of Odesa belong to the group of the Germans of Ukraine, of the Black Sea, of Russia, and, less specifically, of Eastern Europe.

The most populous division are the Volga Germans. More Russia German groups are Caucasus Germans, Petersburg Germans, Baltic Germans, Kazakh Germans, Volhynian Germans, Moscow Germans and Sibirian Germans. Not their ancestral regions divide them into these groups, but also their different cultures. Ukraine Germans are more influenced by Ukrainian culture and Caucasus Germans by Russian and Caucasus culture. The influence in culture got more intense over the years and Russia Germans started to mix their cuisine with typical eastern-european food and to use patterns of typical Russo-Ukrainian clothes in their own or wear them directly like for example Wyshywankas.

== Russia German resettlers in Germany ==
During the advance of the Red Army in the course of World War II, many Black Sea Germans, who had fallen under National Socialist dominion, were relocated by the Nazi SS to Warthegau. They received German citizenship ("administrative resettlers"), but after the end of the war they were forcibly repatriated to Russia. Only in the context of Ostpolitik could more than 70,000 Russian Germans move to Germany in the 1970s and 1980.

With the collapse of the Soviet Union, voluntary migration skyrocketed and the term "return" became common. Since middle of the 1980 more than 2.3 million have emigrated to Germany. The resettlers and late emigres who arrived after the dissolution of the USSR were comparatively well integrated; in 2010 the Swiss journal Neue Zürcher Zeitung called the will to integrate "exemplary", though views conflict on the social and cultural integration of Russia Germans. Men work more often than average in manufacturing and construction, and women often work in marginal employment. Overall, with all family members have taken together, the income distribution of Russia German households is similar to that of the non-immigrant population.

When the Russo-German relationship deteriorated after 2014, declining further since the 2015 start of the refugee crisis in Germany, many Russia Germans felt unfairly treated and unwelcome. Russia had begun to attack Western democracies with propaganda. In the Russian media often consumed by Russia Germans, a mood was set against Chancellor Merkel and neo-fascism was presented as Germany's main characteristic. In 2017, for the first time since 2004, the Federal Agency for Civic Education provided voting advice in Russian. Russian German families had not spoken German over fear of discrimination after the Second World War, but had never learned to form a free opinion, according to the Russia German journalist Ella Schindler. Some withdrew "into the well-known Soviet past" and familiar simple explanatory patterns offered by Russian television.

== See also ==
- History of Germans in Russia, Ukraine, and the Soviet Union
