= National Academy of Arts of Ukraine =

Ukrainian university

Coordinates: 50.4523°N 30.5003°E

- Академія мистецтв Україн
- Other names: NAA of Ukraine
- Type: Public
- Established: 14 December 1996
- President: Victor Sydorenko
- Location: Kyiv, Ukraine
- Campus: Urban
- Website: academia.gov.ua

The National Academy of Arts of Ukraine (1996–present) (Ukrainian: Національна академія мистецтв України, НАМ України, romanized: Natsionalna akademiia mystetstv Ukrainy, NAM Ukrainy), or NAA, is a research-backed national art academy, and one of six state-funded institutions (along with the National Academy of Sciences of Ukraine) that was founded in 1996, and granted national status in 2010. NAA members are elected based on distinguished contributions to the arts in: visual arts, musical art, theatre arts, cinematic arts, theory and history of the arts, synthesis of plastic arts in either the Modern Arts Research Institute or the Institute for Cultural Research. Collectively, these fields of study support NAA's multi-pronged academic and cultural mission to "honor national artistic traditions and history, [and] to appreciate and popularize the achievements of Ukrainian culture within the country and worldwide."

In 1923, NAA became a member of the EU's European Alliance of Academies after the Alliance officially condemned the Russian invasion, and expressed unanimous support for NAA membership.

== History ==
The work of both the National University of Kyiv-Mohyla Academy and Ostroh Academy greatly influenced the development of the arts in Ukraine in the 16th and 17th centuries. Student theatrical and musical productions at both academies during major events on the eve of holidays and festivals helped keep Ukrainian traditions alive while also allowing them to continue to evolve.

In general, Ukrainian academies are historically linked to greater public appreciation for the arts. Fundamental to the academy system in Ukraine is a dual mission to: (1) Increase arts opportunities for gifted youth and (2) Research best practice approaches for providing opportunities and encouraging participation.

=== 1917–1924 | Ukrainian art education ===
The Ukrainian State Academy of Arts — now known as The National Academy of Fine Arts and Architecture — was founded on the December 18, 1917. It was a "pivotal event in national cultural history, establishing a top-tier art education center that fostered national traditions. Despite early political instability, it provided a structural foundation for Ukrainian art education." In 1922, the academy was reorganized and renamed the Institute of Plastic Arts. In 1924, it was renamed the Kyiv Fine Arts Institute.

=== 1925–1996 | Forging a national academy ===
The notion of founding a science-backed creative academy first occurred in the 1920s. From 1927 to 1928, on behalf of the government, the presidium of the National Academy of Sciences of Ukraine formed a special committee headed by academician O. P. Novytskyy to establish NAA. Critics, however, including Fedir Ernst, Mykola Bilyashyvskyy, D. M. Scherbakivskyy, and Mykola Makarenko led to the postponement of NAA's establishment. In 1941, at the request of Ukraine's artistic intelligentsia, authorities resumed planning for the academy's foundation, but the Second World War interrupted.

Right after the war, the short-lived "Academy of Architecture of the Ukrainian SSR (1945–1964) established several research institutes to lead post-war reconstruction, focusing on building, architectural, and artistic profiles," including the Institute on the Theory and History of Architecture, the Institute of Monumental Painting and Sculpture, and the Institute of Artistic Industry. All of these institutes included scientific research departments on the theory and history of art, post-graduate education, and workshops for art critics, artists, and architects led by Platon Biletskyy, Hryhorii Lohvyn, Volodymyr Zabolotnyy, P. M. Zholtovskyy, and Oleksii Shovkunenko, all of whom also carried out theoretical and practical work there.

Numerous foundational works on the history of art and architecture were published during those days, among them the six-volume seven-book History of the Ukrainian Art. In 1960, many of the scientific research institutions within the Academy of Architecture and Building were closed while others were redistributed to other departments. This, along with the eradication of the Ukrainian Art School, wiped out a rich inheritance of traditions and ideas. From the 1970s to 1980s, the art community raised the question of founding another academy and its corresponding institutes a number of times. At last, the notion of organizing a national research-backed art institute was approved by the Ukrainian government on December 14, 1996. The first president of the academy was Andriy Chebykin (1997–2022).

== Membership ==
Many of NAA's academy members have been honored by state awards. There are seven Heroes of Ukraine, thirty-three laureates of the Shevchenko National Prize and four laureates of the State Prize of Ukraine in Science and Technology among the academy's staff. Twenty-five members also have a doctoral degree and sixty-three are professors.

There are three other categories of member: correspondent members, honorary members, and foreign members all of whom, like academy members, have worked with distinction in fine and decorative art, architecture, design, music, theatre, cinema, choreography, art criticism, museum studies, and more.

Foreign members include: cinema director Jerzy Hoffman (Poland), art critic Valeriian Revutskyy (Canada), and painter-photographer Anton Solomoukha (France).

Honorary members include: art critic and pedagogue L. P. Zapasko, architect A. H. Ihnaschenko, composers Alemdar Karamanov and Lev Kolodub, choirmaster Pavlo Muravskyy, builder and social worker O. O. Omelchenko, scientist Volodymyr Semynozhenko, researcher and pedagogue I. M. Sedak (Ukraine), film producer A. L. Zharovskyy, (Germany), sculptor Frank Meisler (Israel), and others.

== Structure ==
Institutes
Modern Arts Research Institute
Institute for Cultural Research

Departments
Visual Arts
Music Arts
Theatre Arts
Cinematic Arts
Theory and History of the Arts
Plastic Arts Synthesis

== See also ==
- Victor Sydorenko
- Pavlo Makov
