= Germans in Ukraine =

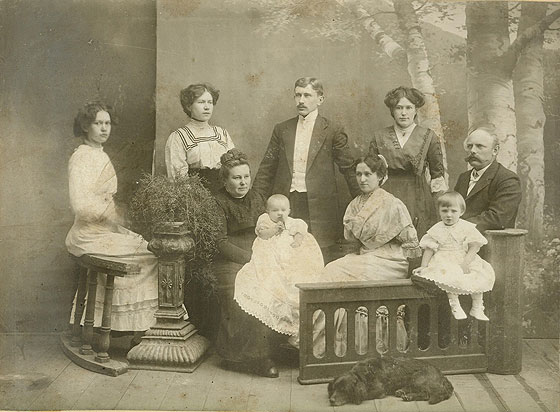
- A Mennonite family from Chortitza Colony

Total population
- 33,300 (2001)

Languages
- German, Ukrainian, Russian

Religion
- Protestantism; Roman Catholicism

Related ethnic groups
- Volga Germans; German minority in Poland

Historically, Germans in Ukrainian lands (German: Ukrainedeutsche; Ukrainian: Українські німці) used to be one of the biggest ethnic minorities in the country. The beginnings of German settlement in modern-day Ukraine date from the Middle Ages, but the majority of German population has been displaced as a result of World War II.

== History ==
=== Early German settlement ===
The earliest information about German presence in territories of today's Ukraine dates from the late 10th century, soon after the Christianization of Kievan Rus'. During the 11th and 12th centuries many German merchants, priests and travellers arrived to Rus' lands, settling in cities such as Kyiv, Volodymyr and Lutsk. The presence of German traders in Kyiv is mentioned in the Hypatian Chronicle.

Following the Mongol invasion of Rus', princes of Galicia-Volhynia started inviting German settlers in order to contribute to the rebuilding of their cities, as well as development of trade and crafts. In order to promote new settlement, newcomers were provided privileges such as freedom from some taxes and self-government according to Magdeburg Law. Starting from the second half of the 13th century, Germans settled in Kholm, Volodymyr, Lutsk, Lviv, Peremyshl, Yaroslav, Sanok and other cities. During that period, Germans served as heads of local government (vogt) in Volodymyr and Lutsk. In Galicia German settlement was actively promoted by prince Yuri II Boleslav.

In Transcarpathia German settlement came from the area of Spiš, and by the 13th century reached Uzhhorod, Mukachevo, Berehovo and Khust. By the 14th century German communes also existed in Tiachiv and Vyshkovo. Numerous privileges were provided to German settlers by Hungarian rulers of the area.

=== Late Middle Ages ===
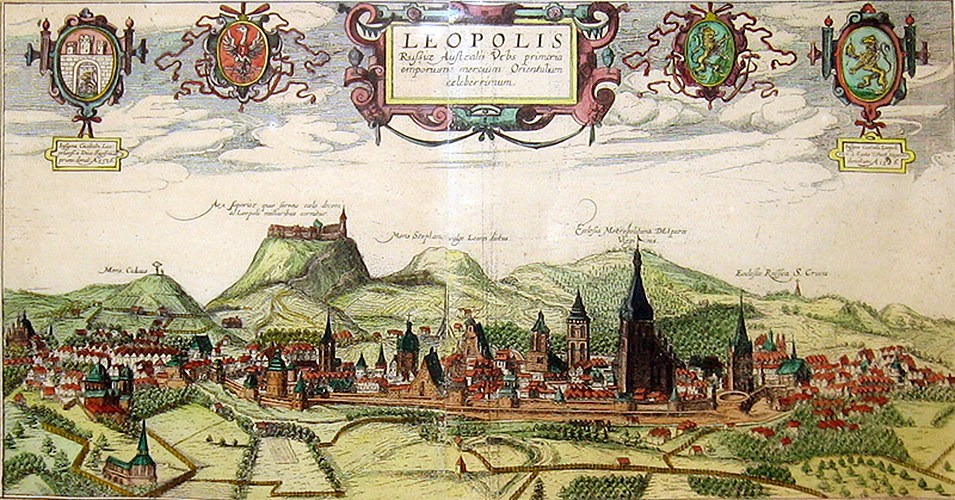
A 1618 panorama of Lviv by A. Hohenberg

Following the incorporation of Galicia by Poland, and Volhynia by Lithuania, German colonization in those regions increased in scale. Starting from 1352, the majority of members of local government in Lviv were elected from the number of Germans, and German became the official language of local administration. German colonies also emerged in Drohobych, Sambir, Halych, Kolomyia, Sniatyn and other cities. Starting from the late 14th century, German settlement spread to Podolia, and a German took the seat of Roman Catholic bishop in Kamianets. A number of Germans from Silesia also settled in rural regions, mostly in the Sian Lowland and near Lviv, receiving self-government according to German law.

Starting from the mid-15th century, German colonization slowed down. Beginning from that time, mostly specialists and craftsmen would arrive to Ukrainian lands from Germany, while the general urban population in Lviv and other locations previously dominated by Germans became Polonized. Many examples of local architecture of the period were influenced by German traditions, and German influence was significant in economic life and local government. Many loanwords from German appeared in the Ukrainian language, most of them belonging to the spheres of trade, crafts, construction etc. The 15th century also saw the beginnings of German settlement in Bukovina.

=== Early modern period ===
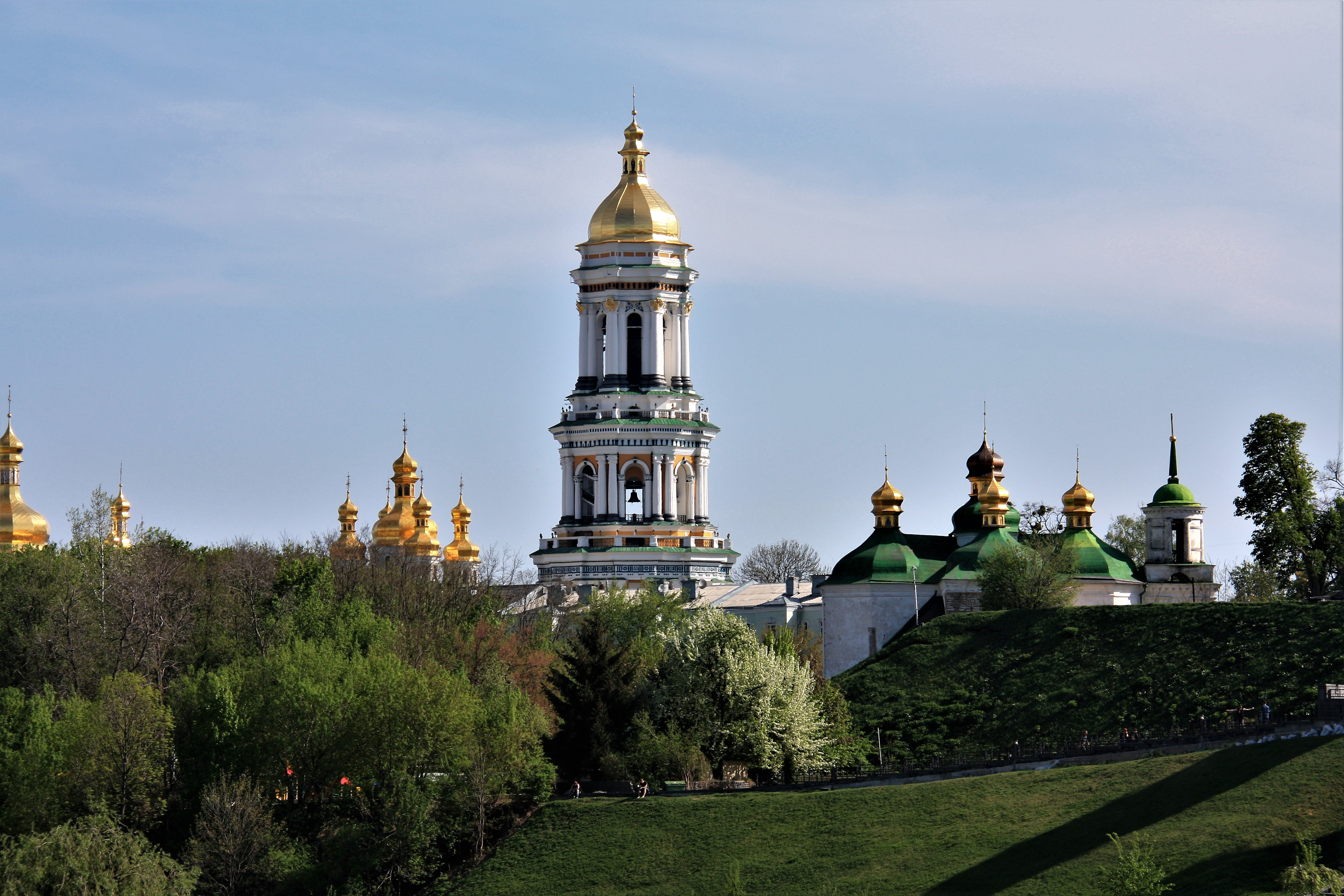
Great Lavra Belltower in Kyiv, erected by German architect Johann Gottfried Schädel in the mid-18th century

Many German mercenaries fought as part of the Polish army against Cossacks and Tatars, in particular during the 1651 Battle of Berestechko, where they played a decisive role in Polish victory. Starting from the 16th century, German merchants and industrialists, most of them from Danzig, appeared in Dnieper Ukraine. They rented large areas of land, especially in the area of Korostyshiv, and engaged in production of potash and tar.

During the period of Cossack Hetmanate, many German craftsmen were employed by members of Cossack starshyna. The hetman's government would also hire numerous German specialists, such as architects, doctors, military officers and teachers. German mercenaries served in the armies of hetmans Ivan Vyhovsky and Petro Doroshenko, but were also present in Muscovite units stationed in Ukraine. Following the Battle of Poltava, many ethnic Germans were present in units of Russian army garrisoned in Ukrainian lands. During the 18th centuries, German colonies were established in Kyiv and several other cities of the Hetmanate. Several German families became parts of local nobility after marrying into the ranks of Cossack starshyna.

In Right-bank Ukraine during the latter half of the 18th century many German colonists arrived on the invitation of local magnate landowners. Many of them were craftsmen employed in manufacturing. In 1763 Russian empress Catherine II issued a manifesto providing free land and numerous privileges to German settlers who would agree to settle in the areas of Volga and Dnieper, including parts of Left-bank Ukraine. In 1767, several German colonies were established in the area of Borzna, and in 1770 German settlers arrived to the vicinity of Krolevets. Following the liquidation of the Zaporozhian Sich, in 1789-1790 Mennonite settlers established colonies on Khortytsia and in several other locations of Zaporozhia.

=== 19th century ===
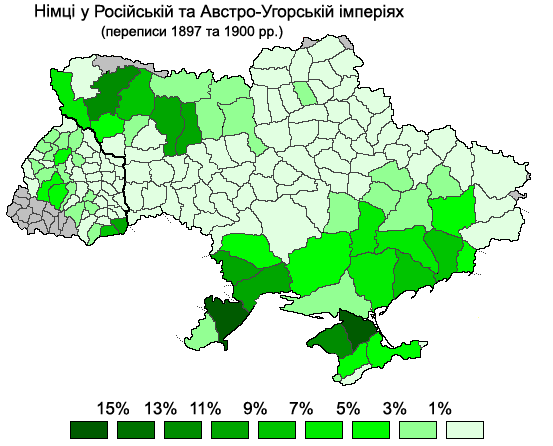
Percentage of Germans in Ukrainian lands in 1897-1900

==== Russian Empire ====
Another manifesto issued by Alexander I in 1804 started mass German colonization in Southern Ukraine, which had become part of the Russian Empire following the disbandment of Zaporozhian Host and expulsion of the Ottomans from those areas. Most settlers in the region stemmed from overpopulated southwestern German lands, such as Baden, Württemberg, Alsace, Palatinate and Rhineland, as well as from Danzig and East Prussia. By the mid-19th century major German colonies emerged in southern Bessarabia, Kherson, Ekaterinoslav and Taurida Governorates, as well as in the area of Taganrog. Some Germans also moved to Kuban and Northern Caucasus. By 1897, the German population of Bessarabia, Kherson, Ekaterinoslav and Taurida reached 345,000, or 4,2% of the total number of inhabitants. By 1911 that number had grown to 489,000, of whom 42,6% were Evangelical, 36,7% Catholic and 20,7% Mennonite.

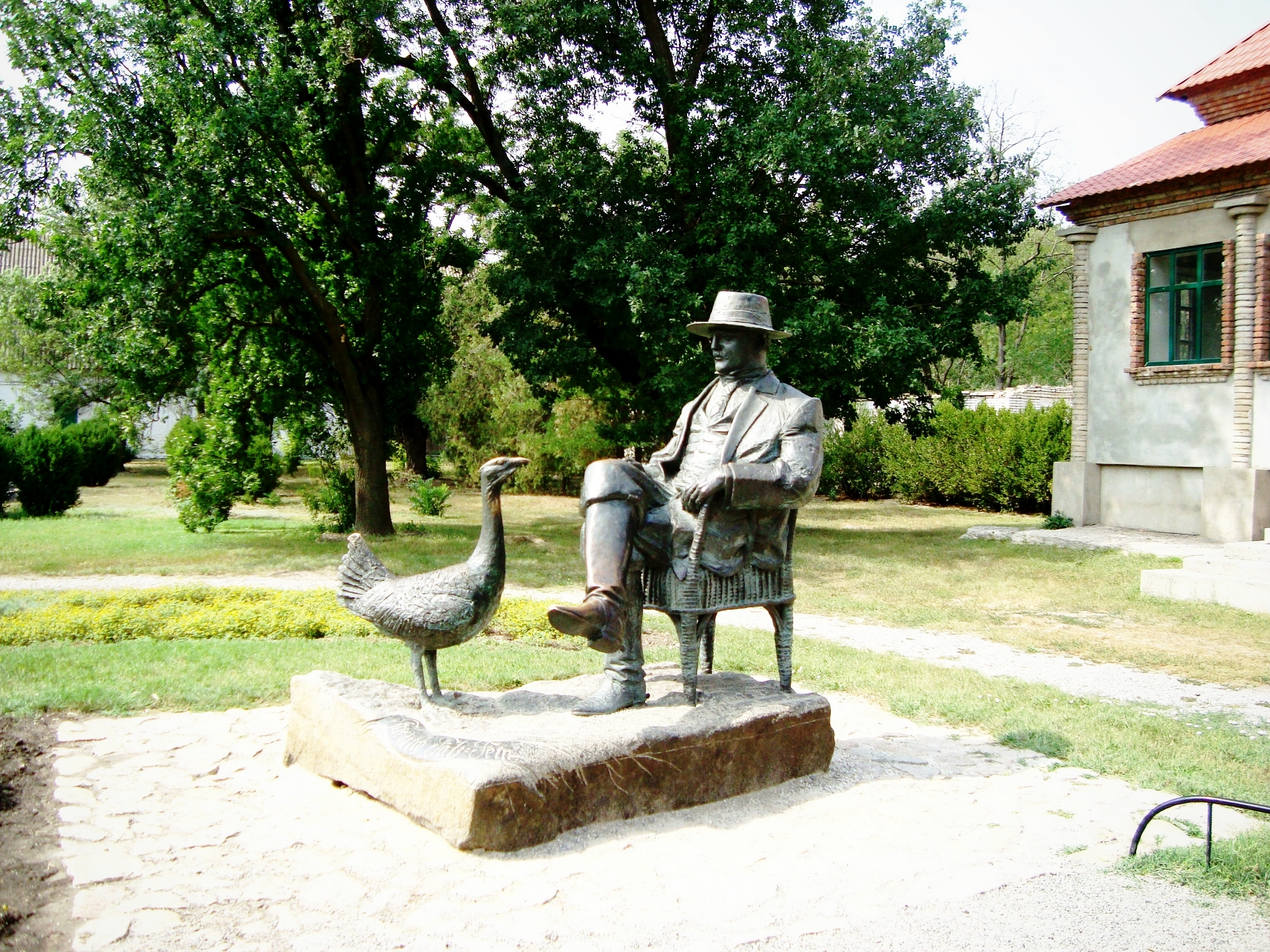
Monument to Friedrich Falz-Fein, the founder of Askania-Nova nature reserve

Starting from the late 18th century, new German settlement also started in Volhynia, but eventually most of the new arrivals moved from there to Southern Ukraine. As of 1860, 4,000 to 5,000 Germans resided in Volhynia. Following the abolition of serfdom, German colonization of the region became more active, as local landowners needed new workers; some Germans were also settled on lands confiscated from Polish nobility after the suppression of the January Uprising of 1863. New settlement became especially active after 1883, and by 1897 170,000 Germans resided in Volhynian Governorate. By 1914 that number exceeded 200,000, with more than half of that number being concentrated in the areas of Zhytomyr and Novohrad-Volynskyi. Significant number of Germans also arrived to the nearby Kholm Governorate.

In total, by 1914 the German population of Russian-ruled Ukrainian ethnic territory comprised 797,000 inhabitants, most of them concentrated in Southern Ukraine in Volhynia. Only around 54,000 Germans lived in other parts of Ukrainian lands under Russian rule. The majority of German colonies existed in rural areas, with the biggest ones being located in southern regions (for example Askania-Nova). Only around 10% of the German population lived in cities. As of 1897, the biggest number of urban residents of German ethnicity in Ukrainian part of the Russian Empire was registered in Odesa, where 10,000 ethnic Germans lived.

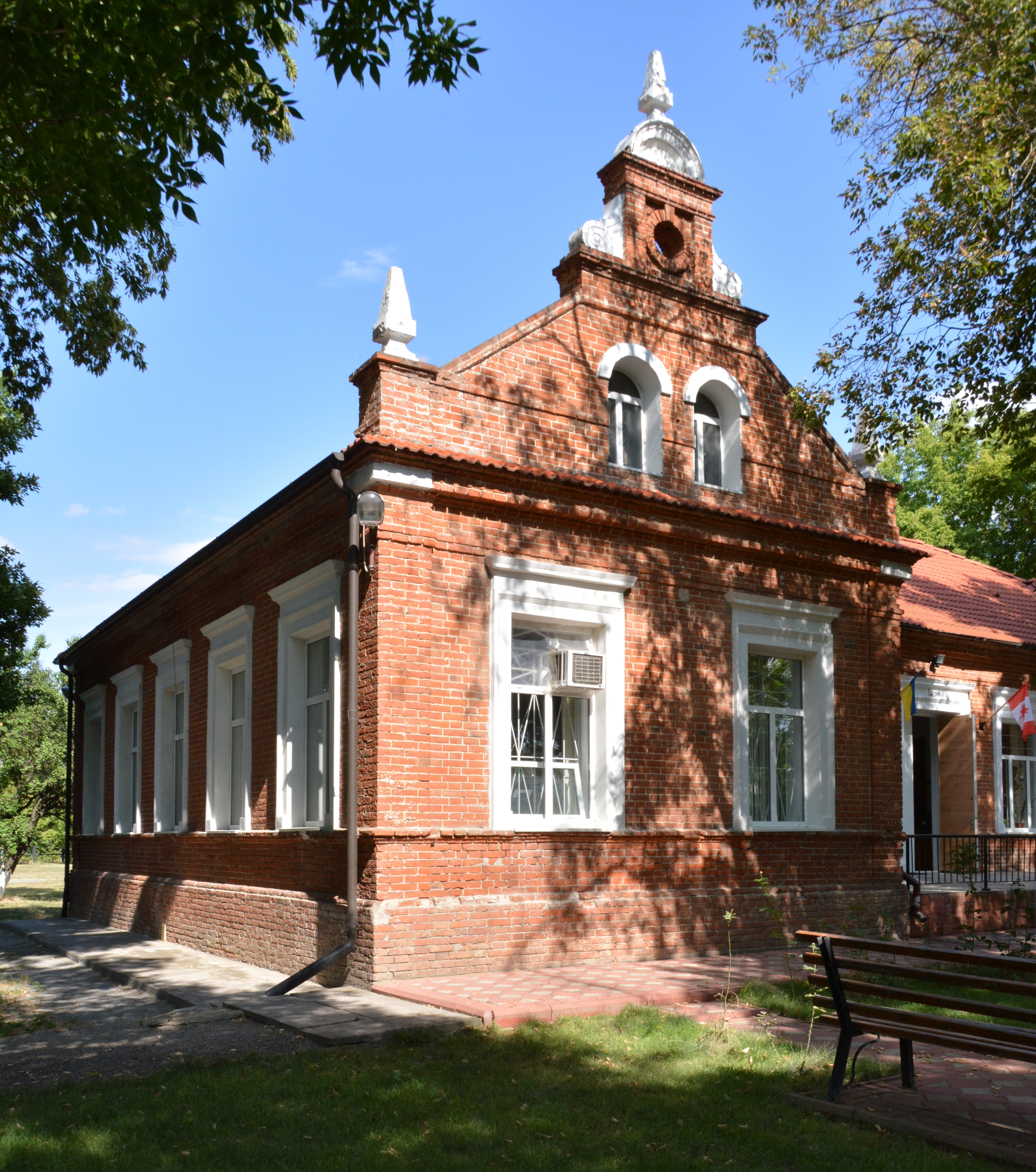
A women's gymnasium in Molochansk, historically known as the German colony of Halbstadt

In general, German colonies boasted a higher level of economic development and education as compared to surrounding settlements. Their inhabitants enjoyed a large degree of self-government and used German language in their schooling and administration. German colonies were directly subjected to the Interior Ministry through its local administrative representative in Katerynoslav (starting from 1818 in Odesa). However, following the Russian military reform of 1871 freedom from conscription and other privileges of German colonists were abolished, their self-government was limited, and after 1875 Russian was introduced as the language of administration and schooling in colonies. These measues led to the emigration of many Germans to Americas.

Despite this, German education was preserved at schools organized by religious communities, and after 1905 a number of private schools teaching in German were established. A German Realschule functioned in Odesa, where starting from 1863 a newspaper in German was being published. Most Germans continued to use their own dialects inside of their communities, despite also knowing Russian and Ukrainian. Only in cities some degree of Russification of Germans occurred. Contacts between German settlers and native Ukrainian population were limited mostly to labour relations and missionary activities. Many Germans took part in the industrial and scientific development of Ukrainian lands, and some also contributed to Ukrainian culture.

==== Habsburg Empire ====
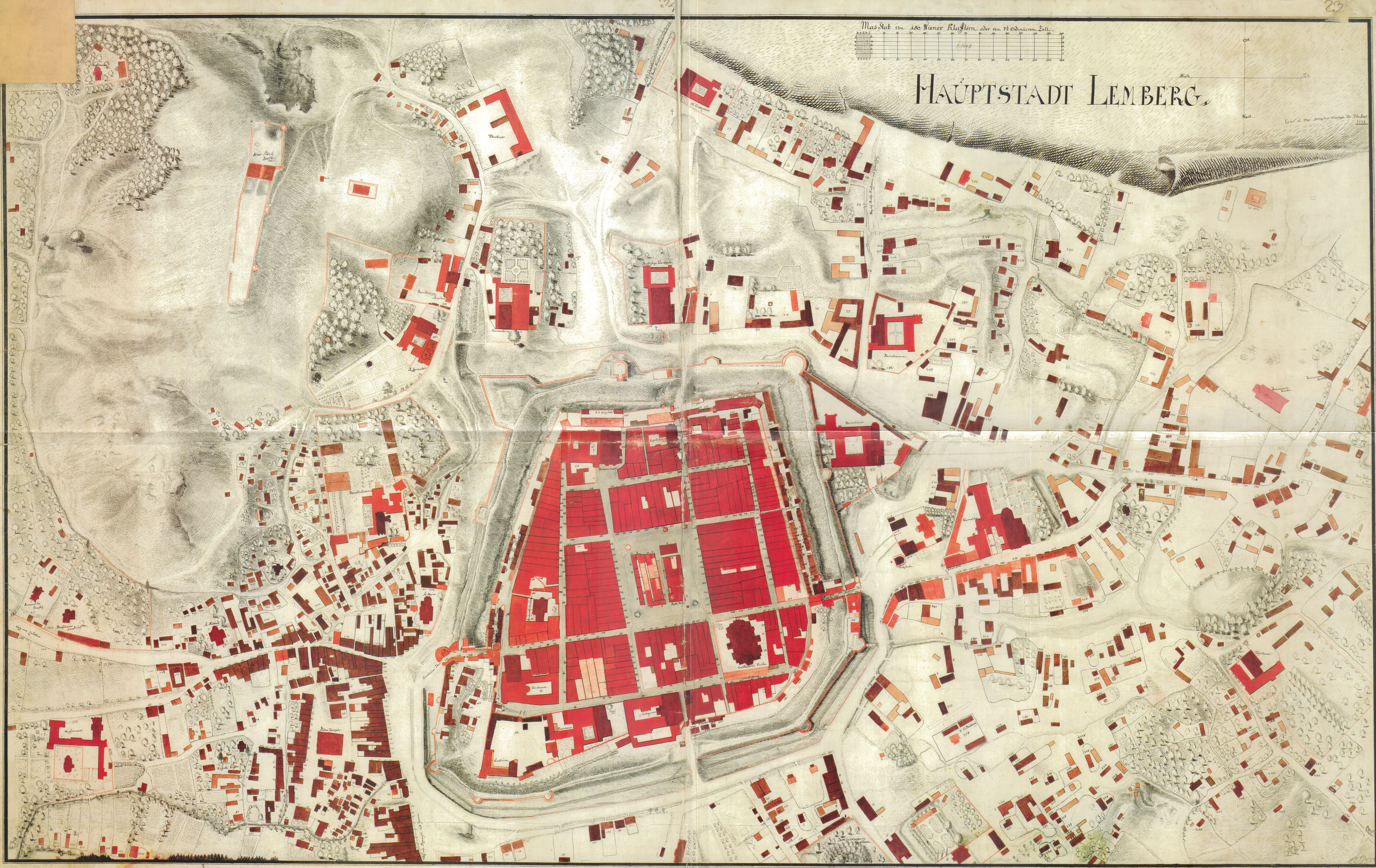
A 1777 plan of Lviv (Lemberg) produced during the early period of Austrian rule

In Austrian-ruled Galicia and Bukovina German settlement started soon after their annexation in 1772-1774 and aimed at Germanization of those areas. According to decrees of Maria Theresa and Joseph II, both Catholic and Protestant settlers received privileges such as freedom from military service and liberation from taxes. Despite this, rural overpopulation made migration to the newly annexed regions unpopular. In Galicia the majority of colonists stemmed from Baden, Württemberg, Hesse and Palatinate; starting from the early 19th century settlers from Egerland also started arriving. The majority of newcomers settled in Ciscarpathia and in the vicinity of Lviv. Many German bureaucrats arrived to the region under Austrian rule. Following the provision of autonomy to Galicia in 1861, Polish was introduced as the language of local administration, as a result of which many German officials left the region, while many others were Polonized. By 1914, 47,000 Germans inhabited Galicia, which comprised 0,9% percent of the whole population. Of them 5,900 resided in Lviv.

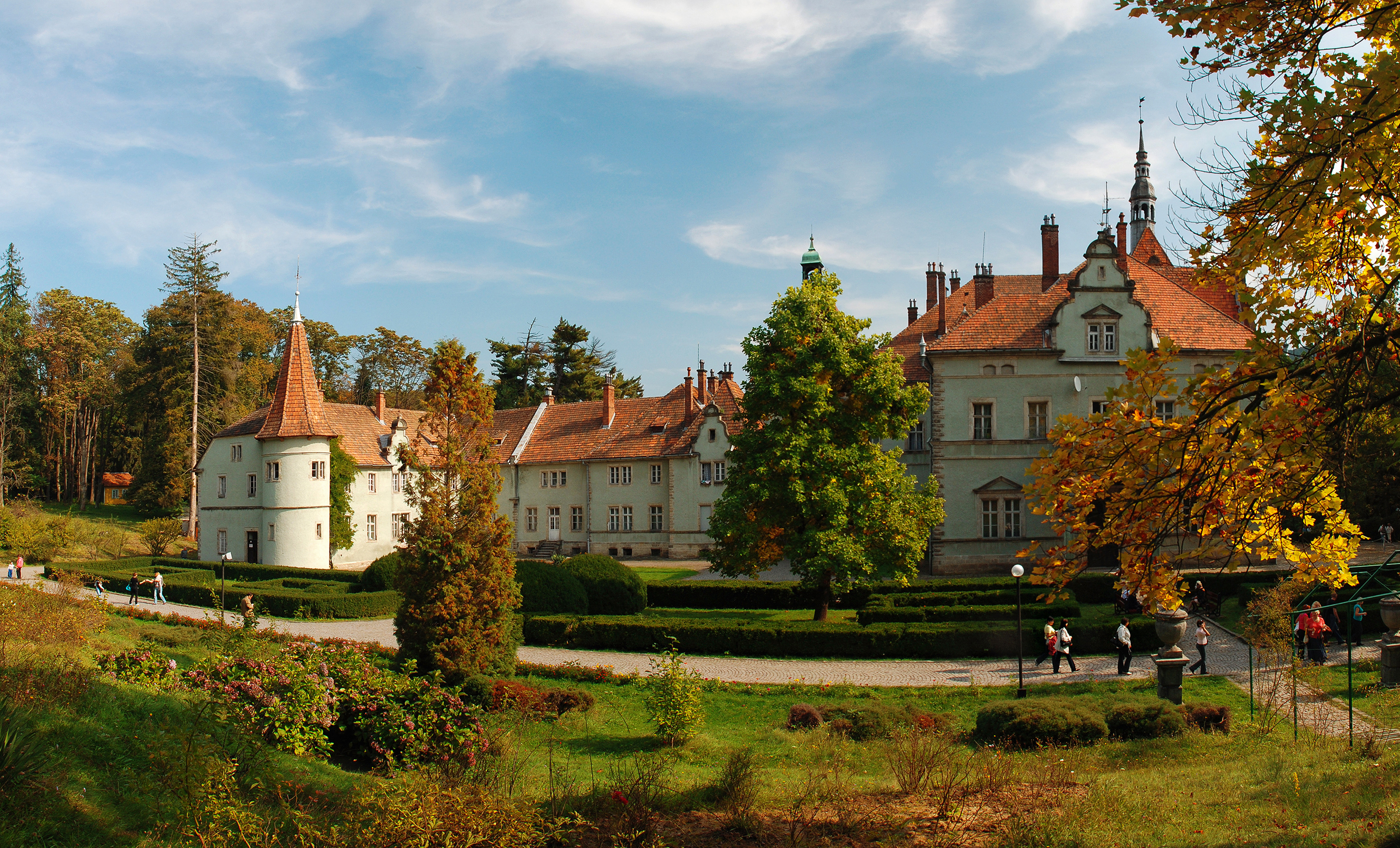
Schönborn Palace in Chynadiiovo, built by a descendant of a German noble family in the late 19th century

Compared to Galicia, German settlement was much more active in Bukovina, which had a lower population density and preserved German as the language of local administration until 1918. As of 1914, 21,000 Germans inhabited Northern Bukovina, which comprised 4,6% of the whole population. Of those, 14,000 lived in Chernivtsi or its suburbs. The visibly German character of the city during that period gave it the nickname "little Vienna".

In Transcarpathia German colonization had significamtly slowed down after the 16th century, and most German settlers gradually assimilated with local Slavs. A small number of German colonists arrived to the region during the 18th and early 19th centuries. By 1914 10,000 Germans lived in Transcarpathia, with most of them being employed in agriculture and forestry.

=== 20th century ===
==== First World War and Interwar period ====
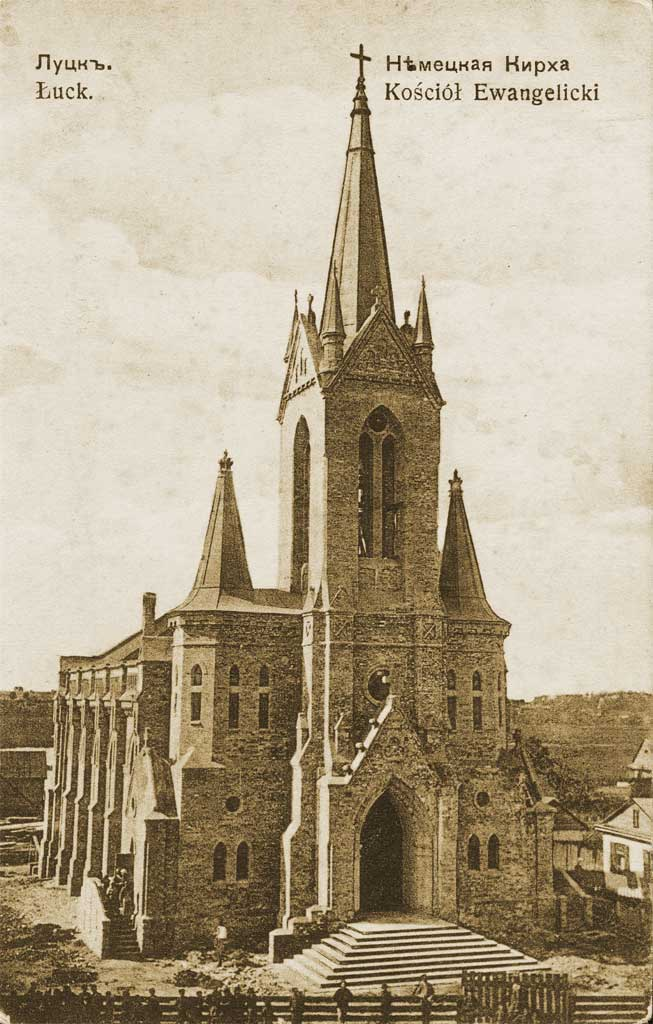
Lutheran Church in Lutsk, Volhynia, before World War I

The beginning of World War I brought great hardships to the German population of Ukrainian lands. In 1915 the Russian government issued two decrees, according to which Germans residing in Volhynia and Kholm Governorates were to be deported to Siberia and other remote areas; only a part of them could return after the end of the war. In the aftermath of the conflict, in 1919 many German colonists in Southern Ukraine suffered during the pogroms perpetrated by forces of Nestor Makhno. Additionally, in 1921-1923 a major famine engulfed the region. As a result, a significant part of ethnic Germans left Ukraine for Germany or emigrated to the Americas, while many of those who remained moved to cities.

The German community was generally indifferent to the Ukrainian struggle for independence in 1917–1920. Nevertheless, a number of ethnic German officers served in the ranks of Ukrainian People's Army and Ukrainian Galician Army. In West Ukrainian People's Republic, a representative of local Germans was a member of the Ukrainian National Council. In Bukovina the local German community supported the union with Romania.

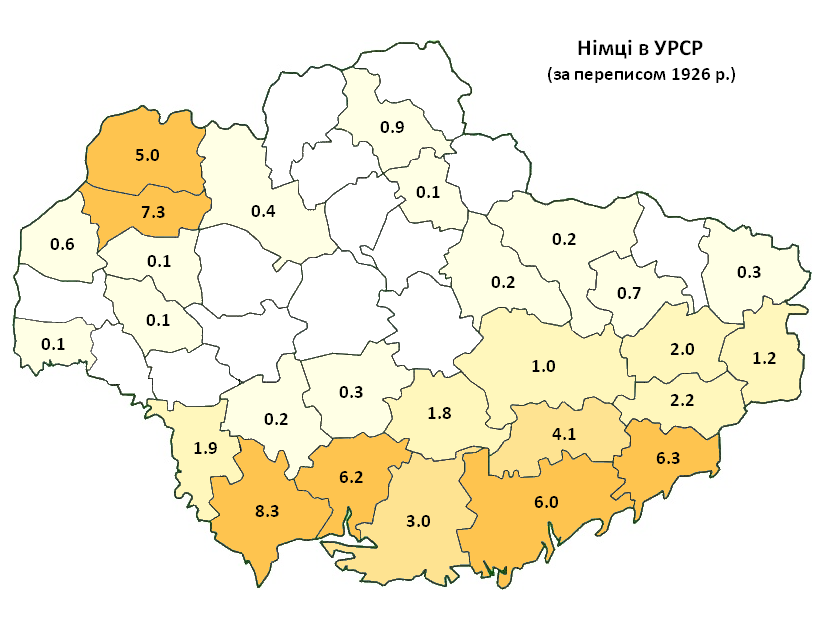
Percentage of Germans in areas of Ukrainian SSR as of 1926

According to the 1926 Soviet census, 394,000 ethnic Germans lived in the territory of Ukrainian SSR. In addition, 44,000 Germans inhabited Crimea, and 96,000 inhabited largely Ukrainian-populated lands in North Caucasus. In the Second Polish Republic 87,000 Germans lived in Ukrainian-majority areas according to the 1931 census. Additionally, 36,000 Germans lived in Romanian-controlled areas of Bukovina, and 12,000 lived in Czechoslovak-ruled Transcarpathia as of 1930.

In the Ukrainian SSR six German national districts and several dozens of village councils were established. German schools were created, books and newspapers were published in German language, and a German pedagogical institute functioned in Odesa. However, during the collectivization many Germans were proclaimed to be kulaks and persecuted. The situation was exacerbated by the famine of 1932-1933. Eventually, German churches were confiscated by authorities, and all national organs of local government disbanded. In 1936-1938 the majority of German intelligentsia, including priests, teachers and doctors was exterminated. More and more Germans were resettling from the country to major urban areas.

In Polish-controlled areas of Western Ukraine the German community was able to establish close ties with Germany, and sometimes cooperated with Ukrainians during elections to the Sejm and Senate as part of the Bloc of National Minorities. In Bukovina local Germans had their representatives in the Romanian parliament.

==== Second World War and aftermath ====
Historical German populations in modern-day borders of Ukraine
Year	Pop.	±%
1914	872,000	—
1926	514,000	−41.1%
1932	610,000	+18.7%
2001	33,000	−94.6%

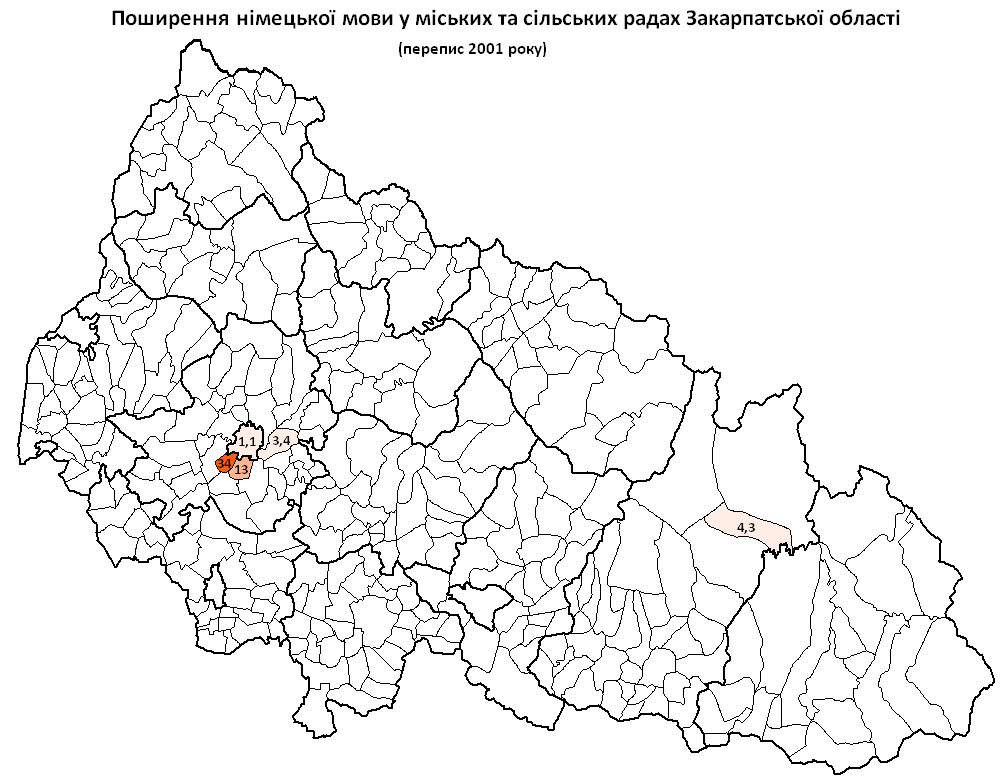
Percentage of German speakers in local councils of Zakarpattia Oblast as of 2001

Following the Soviet annexation of Eastern Galicia and Volhynia, all Germans living in the area were deported ("repatriated") to Germany according to a treaty signed between the Third Reich and USSR. The same fate awaited Germans of Bessarabia and Bukovina after the 1940 Soviet annexation.

After the start of German-Soviet War, in August 1941 Germans from Crimea and Left-bank Ukraine were deported to Northern Caucasus, and later to Kazakhstan. Most Germans in Right-bank Ukraine and steppe regions were able to stay, and received the status of Volksdeutsche from occupation authorities. Many of them served in police and paramilitary formations, which led to hostility from the locals.

During the retreat of German armies from Ukraine in 1943, German administration resettled 350,000 Germans from occupied areas to Western Poland (Warthegau), and later to Germany. Around 250,000 of them were eventually captured by the Soviet Army and deported to Northern Russia (Komi ASSR) or Central Asia, where they were employed in forced labour. In 1955 an amnesty in respect to deported Germans was declared by Soviet authorities, but they were still forbidden to return to previous places of residence. As a result, the German community in Ukraine de facto ceased to exist, and no information about the number of ethnic Germans residing in the country was presented by official Soviet statistics.

The majority of ethnic German populations in the villages of Ust-Chorna (Königsfeld) and Nimetska Mokra (Deutsch-Mokra) in Tiachiv Raion of Zakarpattia Oblast were able to return to their settlements after forced deportation during the Second World War, and adopted Soviet citizenship. Many of them continued to work in forestry, but starting from the 1970s emigration to Germany became a popular choice among the community's members. Since the 1990s, the majority of local Germans have relocated to Germany. Currently, only a few speakers of German reside in the villages.

=== Modern Ukraine ===
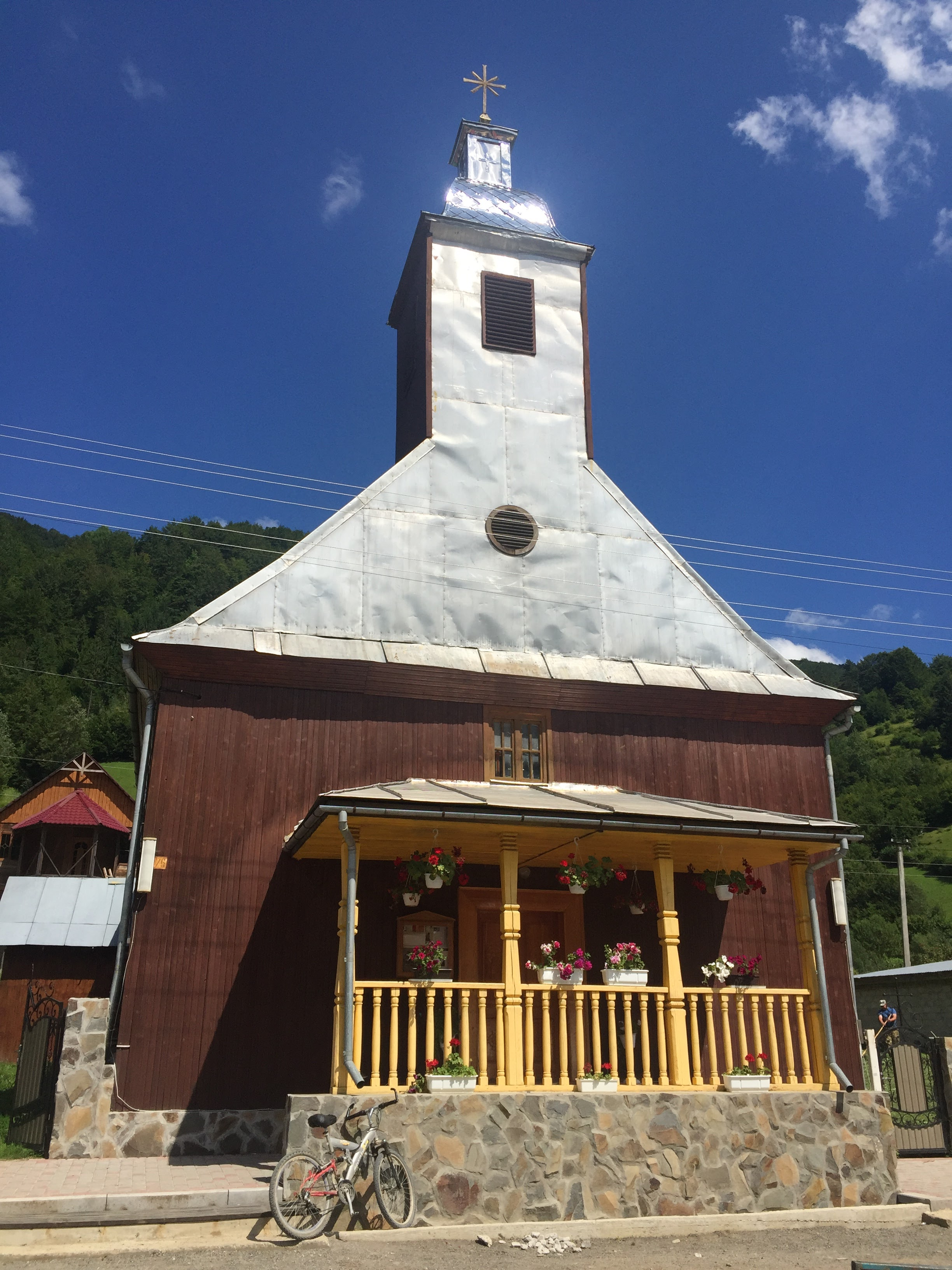
Church of Saint John of Nepomuk in Nimetska Mokra (Deutsch-Mokra)

Following the dissolution of the Soviet Union, organizations of Germans stemming from Ukraine started organizing trips to objects of German heritage in the country, and also engaged in projects aimed at developing local communities.

After the proclamation of Ukrainian indepenence, societies for support of German culture were organized in Zakarpattian towns of Svaliava (Schwalbach) and Chynadiiovo. Activists of the organization have organized gathering of German songs from descedants of settlers in surrounding villages. The German community in the region is served by two Catholic priests, who organize religious services in German language. Along with religious celebrations common with the Ukrainian majority, they also mark specifically German feasts such as Fasching, Mother's Day and Kirchweih. The local German dialect is commonly known among its speakers as "Swabian". A program of Goethe-Institut promotes the learning of German language among youth of German descent in the region.

In 2017 memorial signs commemorating the 500th anniversary of Protestant Reformation were installed in several villages of Liuboml Raion in Volyn Oblast, where the ethnic German group of Holenders had historically resided.

== Historical German populations in Ukraine ==
- Black Sea Germans
- Bukovina Germans
- Carpathian Germans
- Crimea Germans
- Galician Germans
- Holenders
- Russian Mennonites
- Volhynian Germans

== Notable people of German ethnicity in Ukraine ==
- Innocent Giesel, Eastern Orthodox clergyman
- Gottfried Johann Schädel, architect
- Johann Georg Pinsel, sculptor
- Bernard Meretyn, architect
- Alexander Pol, industrialist
- Georgy Pfeiffer, mathematician
- Willibald Besser, botanist
- Ernst Rudolf von Trautvetter, botanist
- Ivan Schmalhausen, biologist
- Nikolai von Bunge, economist
- Fedir Ernst (Theodor Ernst), art historian
- Yuriy Klen (real name Oswald Burghardt), poet
- Olha Kobylianska, writer (German ancestry on her mother's side)
- Karl Emil Franzos, writer
- Ivan Levynskyi, architect (German ancestry on mother's side)
- Uliana Kravchenko (real name Julia Schneider), poet
- Leopold von Sacher-Masoch, writer
- Alfred Schamanek, military officer
- Teodor Shteingel (Theodor von Steinheil), archaeologist and diplomat
- Mykola Porsh, politician and diplomat
- Alexander Schlichter, revolutionary
- Eugenia Bosch, revolutionary
- Antin Kravs (Anton Kraus), military officer
- George Shevelov (born Yuri Schneider), linguist
- Erich Saling, gynaecologist and obstetrician
- Vlodko Kaufman, painter
- Olha Freimut, TV presenter (German ancestry on mother's side)
