= Olha Bench =

Ukrainian musicologist

Olha Hryhorivna Bench (Ukrainian: Ольга Григорівна Бенч; born 14 March 1955), also known as Shokalo-Bench, is a Ukrainian conductor, musicologist, candidate of art studies (1990), associate professor, professor, Honored Artist of Ukraine (1998), People's Artist of Ukraine (2010), Deputy Minister of Culture and Tourism of Ukraine (now Ministry of Culture and Information Policy) (2005–2010), Consulate General of Ukraine in Pryašev (Slovakia) (2010–2015).

== Early life and education ==
Olha Bench was born on 14 March 1955 in the village of Gutysko, Ternopil Oblast, Ukrainian SSR. She received secondary and musical education in the schools of Truskavets. From 1972 to 1976, Bench studied at the Drohobych State Music School. From 1976 to 1981, she studied at Mykola Lysenko Lviv National Music Academy, then from 1984 to 1987 in assistantship-internship and postgraduate studies at the Ukrainian National Tchaikovsky Academy of Music. Bench interned at the National Opera of Ukraine. In parallel, from 1981 to 1984, she was a teacher in the orchestral conducting department at the Kharkiv State Institute of Culture. In 1990, she received the academic title of Candidate of Art Studies.

== Career ==
In 1991, Bench founded and led the chamber choir "Ukrainian Singing," which voiced the films The Thicket and Journey to the Lost Past (about the musical and cultural traditions of the Severia). The choir also successfully performed at the European Culture Month in Krakow in a cultural and public event, "Let's save Ukrainian churches in Poland" (1992) and a government concert at the First and Second World Forums of Ukrainians (1992; 1997).

From 1987 to 2005, Bench was an associate professor and professor at the Ukrainian National Tchaikovsky Academy of Music. Then, from 2005 to 2010, she was Ukraine's Deputy Minister of Culture and Tourism. From 2010 to 2015, Bench was the General Consul of Ukraine in Pryševo (Slovakia).

Since 2014, she has been working as a guarantor of pedagogical and artistic directions at the Catholic University in Ružomberok (Slovakia). In 2018, Bench was elected rector of the Kyiv Academy of Arts. In 2018, she was included in the encyclopedia "Britishpedia" for developing Ukrainian-Slovak relations in the section "Prominent persons of the Czech Republic and Slovakia."

== Works ==
Bench is the author of more than 100 publications, including monographs:

- Pavlo Muravskyi. The phenomenon of one life. — Kyiv: Dnipro, 2002. — 663 p. — ISBN 966-578-108-1.
- Ukrainian choral singing. Actualization of customary tradition: Education. study guide higher education closing — Kyiv: Editorial office of the magazine "Ukrainian World," 2002. — 440 p. — ISBN 966-7586-05-7.

== Awards and honors ==
- Honorary Diploma of the Cabinet of Ministers of Ukraine (1999);
- Order of St. Nicholas the Wonderworker III degree (2005);
- Honorary award of the Ministry of Culture and Tourism of Ukraine "For achievements in the development of culture and arts" (2006)
- Certificate of Honor of the Mayor of Kyiv "For significant personal contribution to the development of culture and high professionalism" (2006);
- Order of Queen Anna Yaroslavna (2008);
- Laureate of the award named after M. V. Lysenko for scientific activity (2008);
- Laureate of the award of the National All-Ukrainian Music Union (2008);
- Winner of the All-Ukrainian Award "Woman of the 3rd Millennium" in the "Rating" nomination (2010);
- Diploma of the Ministry of Foreign Affairs of Ukraine (2013);
- "Pride of Truskavets-2017" award, nomination "Ambassador of Truskavets-2017" (2017);
- Medal "For Sacrifice and Love of Ukraine" on the occasion of the state commemorative date of the Baptism of Kyiv Rus-Ukraine (2019).
