= Zhanna Kolodub =

Ukrainian pianist and composer (1930–2025)

- Жанна Колодуб
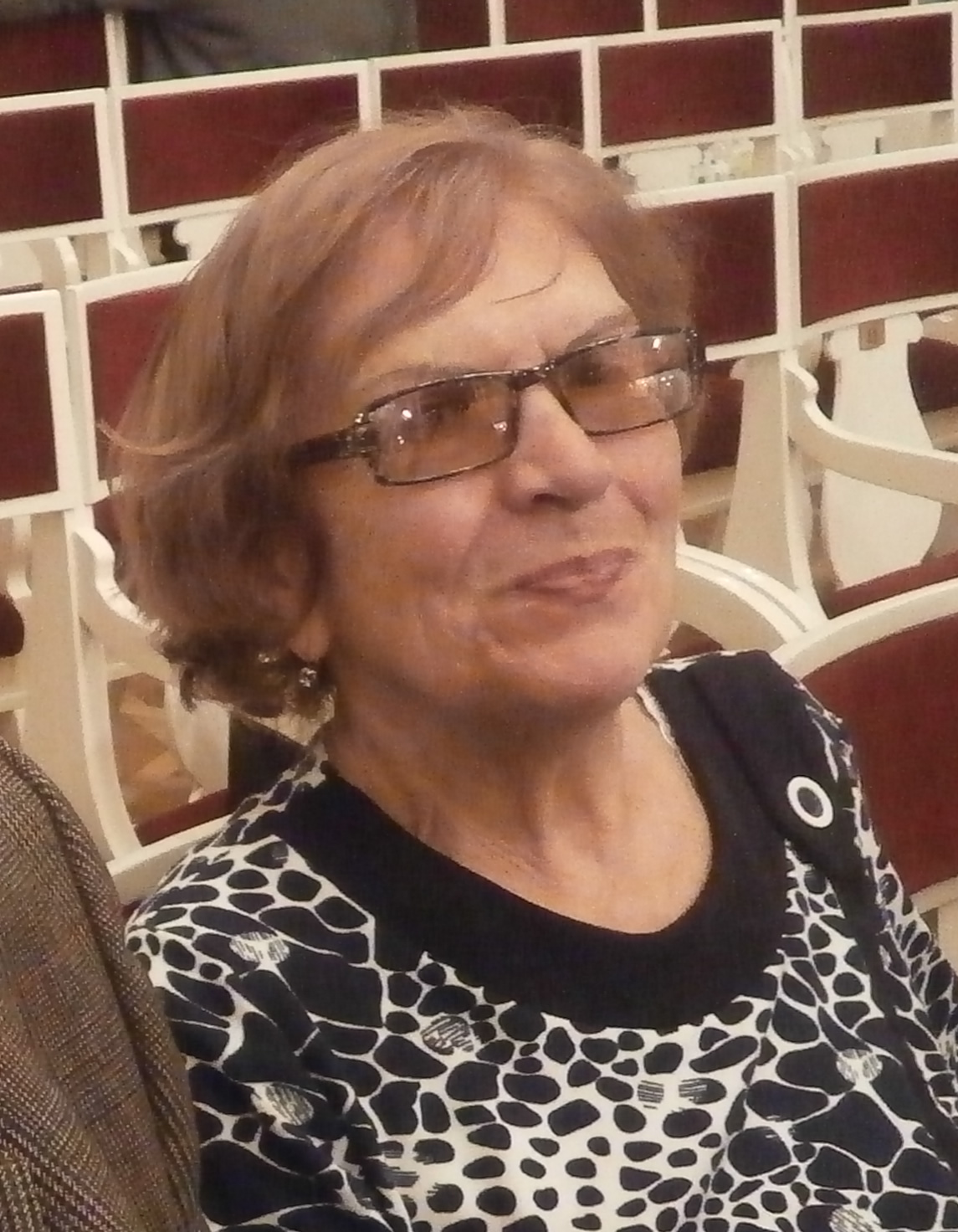
- Kolodub in 2015
- Born: 1 January 1930; Vinnytsia, Ukrainian SSR, Soviet Union
- Died: 28 August 2025 (aged 95); Ukraine
- Occupations: Composer; academic teacher
- Organizations: Ukrainian National Tchaikovsky Academy of Music; National Union of Composers of Ukraine
- Title: Merited Culture Worker of Ukraine
- Spouse: Lev Kolodub
- Awards: People's Artist of Ukraine

Zhanna Yukhymivna Kolodub (Ukrainian: Жанна Юхимівна Колодуб; 1 January 1930 – 28 August 2025) was a Ukrainian composer and teacher, beginning as lecturer at the Kyiv Conservatory in 1952 and as professor from 1997. Her major compositions are ballets and orchestral works; she also wrote vocal compositions, chamber music, piano works and film scores. Her work has been described as having "fearless emotionalism and melodic clarity". She headed the Commission for Musical and Aesthetic Education of Children and Youth of the National Union of Composers of Ukraine.

== Life and career ==
Kolodub was born in Vinnytsia on 1 January 1930, into a family of musicians. She composed her first work at age five. She studied violin and piano at Kyiv's Gliere School of Music, graduating in 1949. She studied piano further at the Kyiv Conservatory with Konstantin Mikhailov, graduating in 1954. At age 24, she decided to pursue composition seriously; she studied it with Boris Lyatoshynsky and her future husband, Lev Kolodub.

At the conservatory she became a lecturer of piano in 1952, then associate professor (1985) and finally professor (1997), teaching more than 300 students. In 1995, after Ukraine's independence, the conservatory became the Ukrainian National Tchaikovsky Academy of Music. She was a member of the National Union of Composers of Ukraine, becoming deputy chair of its Commission for Musical and Aesthetic Education of Children and Youth, and later chair of that commission. She was a corresponding member of the National Academy of Arts of Ukraine in 2009.

In 1996, she was named a Merited Culture Worker of Ukraine. She is the laureate of the Mykola Lysenko Prize (2002), the International Academic Rating of Popularity and Quality "Golden Fortune" (2002), the Victor Kosenko Prize (2004), and the International Competition of Works for Great Instruments (Rivne).

On 5 March 2009, the title People's Artist of Ukraine was bestowed on Kolodub for a significant personal contribution to the socio-economic and cultural development of Ukraine, public activity, long-term conscientious work, related to International Women's Day on 8 March. In 2010 she received the gold medal from the National Academy of Arts of Ukraine.

Kolodub died on 28 August 2025, at the age of 95.

== Work ==
Kolodub's major compositions are the ballets Snow Queen and Adventures of Vesnianka, the orchestral piece Lyrical Scenes of Kiev, Pictures of Nature for chamber orchestra, works for string orchestra, piano music, a wind quartet and other chamber music especially for winds. Vocal compositions include choral music, musicals, songs and film scores. Her work has been described as of "fearless emotionalism and melodic clarity". A reviewer of a recording of her Concertino for oboe and piano noted: "Beginning and ending in a pastoral mood –although at the end the music is more "knowing", more mature, because of what has happened in the middle – it contains a section of more animated and angular music. The composer never looses sight of how to communicate with her audience and this is a most satisfactory work".

Many of her works were published, some in the United States, Canada, the United Kingdom, and Germany.

- Adventure on the Mississippi, musical based on Mark Twain’s Adventures of Huckleberry Finn, 1971.
- Children's Album: Early intermediate Piano Solos. Mississauga, Ont.: F. Harris Music, 1997.
- Children's Games: 13 pieces for Piano. NY: Associated Music Publishers, 1977.
- Concertino for oboe and strings. Harbach Music Publishing (HMP, formerly Vivace Press), 1995.
- Concertino for oboe and piano, arrangement by the composer. HMP, 1995.
- Two Dance Suites, 1961, 1965.
- Dances of the People: Piano Works from Ukraine, for solo piano. Pullman, HMP, 1996.
- Lyrical Scenes of Kiyv, 1976.
- Märchenhafte Volkslieder. Oberhausen: Sternscher Musikverlag, 2001.
- Merry Girls, musical comedy, 1968.
- Nocturne & Poem for flute and piano. Basel: Terem Music, 2021.
- Piano Concerto. Kyiv: Muzychna Ukraïna, 1974.
- Poema, for solo organ. Pullman, HMP, 1997.
- Pryhody divchynky vesni︠a︡nky: balet. Kyiv: Muzychna Ukraïna, 1972.
- Sимфоніета для смрунногооркесмру / Symfonieta dli︠a︡ strunnogo orkestru. Kiiv: МузичнаУкраіна, 1971.
- Streit: für zwei Flöten. Oberhausen: Int. Sternscher Musikverlag, 2000.
- Suite for orchestra.
- Suite für Glockenspiel und Klavier. Oberhausen: Int. Sternscher Musikverlag, 2005.
- Three Fragments, for solo oboe. Edited by Cynthia Green Libby. Vivace Press, 2005.
- Toccata-Poem for solo piano. HMP, 2005.
- Thumbelina, ballet for children based on Hans Christian Andersen'’s story.
- Ukrainian Suite for flute, oboe, clarinet (B♭& A), horn in F & bassoon. [Strathmashie]: Phylloscopus Publications, 2001
- Vokalʹni tvory = Vokalʹnye proizvedenii︠a︡. Kyiv: Muzychna Ukraïna, 1980.
