= Victor Sydorenko =

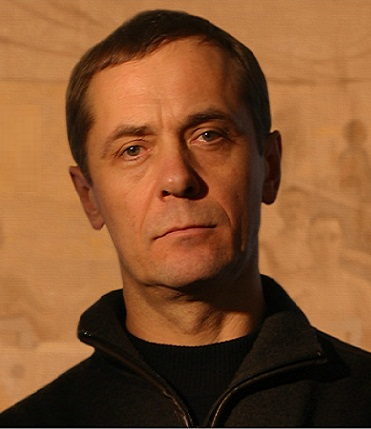
Victor Sydorenko

Victor Sydorenko (Ukrainian: Сидоренко Віктор Дмитрович; born 31 December 1953) is a painter, curator, teacher, an author of objects and photocompositions and also scientific and publicistic texts. Since 1997 he has been a member and the vice-president of Ukrainian Academy of Arts. In 2001 Sydorenko headed Modern Art Research Institute of Ukrainian Academy of Arts.

== Biography ==
Sydorenko was born Taldy-Kurgan, Kazakhstan, then part of the USSR. At the age of 8, he took an interest in the painting and at the age of 10, in photography.

After completing his secondary education and doing his military service Sydorenko entered Kharkov Art-Industrial Institute (the Kharkov State Academy of Design and Arts) from which in 1979 he graduated with the degree with distinction. The student of the professor, the winner of The USSR State Prize, B.Kosarev, in 1981 he became the post-graduate student of the creative workshops of the Art School of the USSR. (The supervisor of studies – the academician, the professor, the member of academy of arts of the USSR, the Winner of The USSR State Prize, S.Grigorev) At the same time Victor worked as an art director of the film The Anatomy of the miracle, director V.Ivanov).

Sydorenko's pathway from realism to neoavant-gardism is represents the freedom of creativity of the last generation that grown and was working at a totalitarian regime. In the project "Levitation" (2008–2009), the artist gives an advantage to the optical illusive game which is created by dense and viscous red colour and by the space with large-format picturesque planes and installation. Man's figures stretched out and soaring in air, are forcing to lose reference points and coordinates, and even yourself.

== Awards ==
- 1996, Kyiv, Ukraine. The winner of "Golden section" at Art festival.
- 2000, Kyiv, Ukraine. The winner of "the Gold Palette» on "Millennium-opening day".
- 2003, Kyiv, Ukraine. Golden Medal of Ukrainian Academy of Arts.
- 2005, Magdebourg, Germany. The author of the best project of V International Festival of Arts.

== Biennials ==
- 2003 – "Millstones of time", the personal project at 50th International exhibition of the modern art in Venice. The author and the curator of the project.
- 2007 – "The poem about an internal sea", the Ukrainian project at 52nd International exhibition of the modern art in Venice. The co-curator.

== Collections ==
- National Art Museum of Ukraine
- Kharkiv Museum of Fine Arts, Ukraine
- Krasnograd Museum of Regional Studies, Ukraine
- Stakhanov Museum of History and Fine Arts, Ukraine
- Museum of Contemporary Art KIASMA, Helsinki, Finland
- Ministry of Culture and Arts of Ukraine
- Ismayil Art Gallery, Ukraine
- Yale University, School of Art, United States

== Bibliography ==
- Н.Мусієнко. Аутентифікація – крок до само ідентифікації (N. Musienko. Authentification - a step to self-identification) //Курсив (The italics) . No.2. 2009.
- Н.Булавіна. Футурама Віктора Сидоренка (N. Bulavina. The futurama of VIctor Sydorenko) // Fine Arts. No.1. 2009.
- О.Тарасенко. На границе двух реальностей (O. Tarassenko. On the border of two realities) // Ukrainian Art Today. К. 2008.
- Olivier Jean. Millstones of Time. Traverse-video 2007. La Re-visite. 2007. Toulouse.
- Eastern Neighbours. Utrecht. 2006.
- Millstones of Time Faster than History. Contemporary Perspectives on the Future of Art in the Baltic Countries, Finland, Russia. Helsinki. «KIASMA». 2004.
- О.Сидор-Гибелинда. Творимая легенда (O. Sidor-Guibelinda. The legend which is being created) // Политик-Hall (Politic-hall). 2004.
- Elaine W. Ng. The 50th Venice Biennale. Leonardo reviews. 2003.
- Michael Kimmelman. Cramming It All In at the Venice Biennale// The New York Times. 2003.
- Паралійський Є. Художні серії про наше життя (E. Paraliyskiy. Art series about our life) // Літературна Україна (Literary Ukraine). 1998.

== See also ==
- Ukrainian Academy of Arts
- Modern Art Research Institute of Ukrainian Academy of Arts
