= Lev Kolodub =

Ukrainian composer and teacher (1930–2019)

- Ukrainian: Левко́ Микола́йович Колоду́б
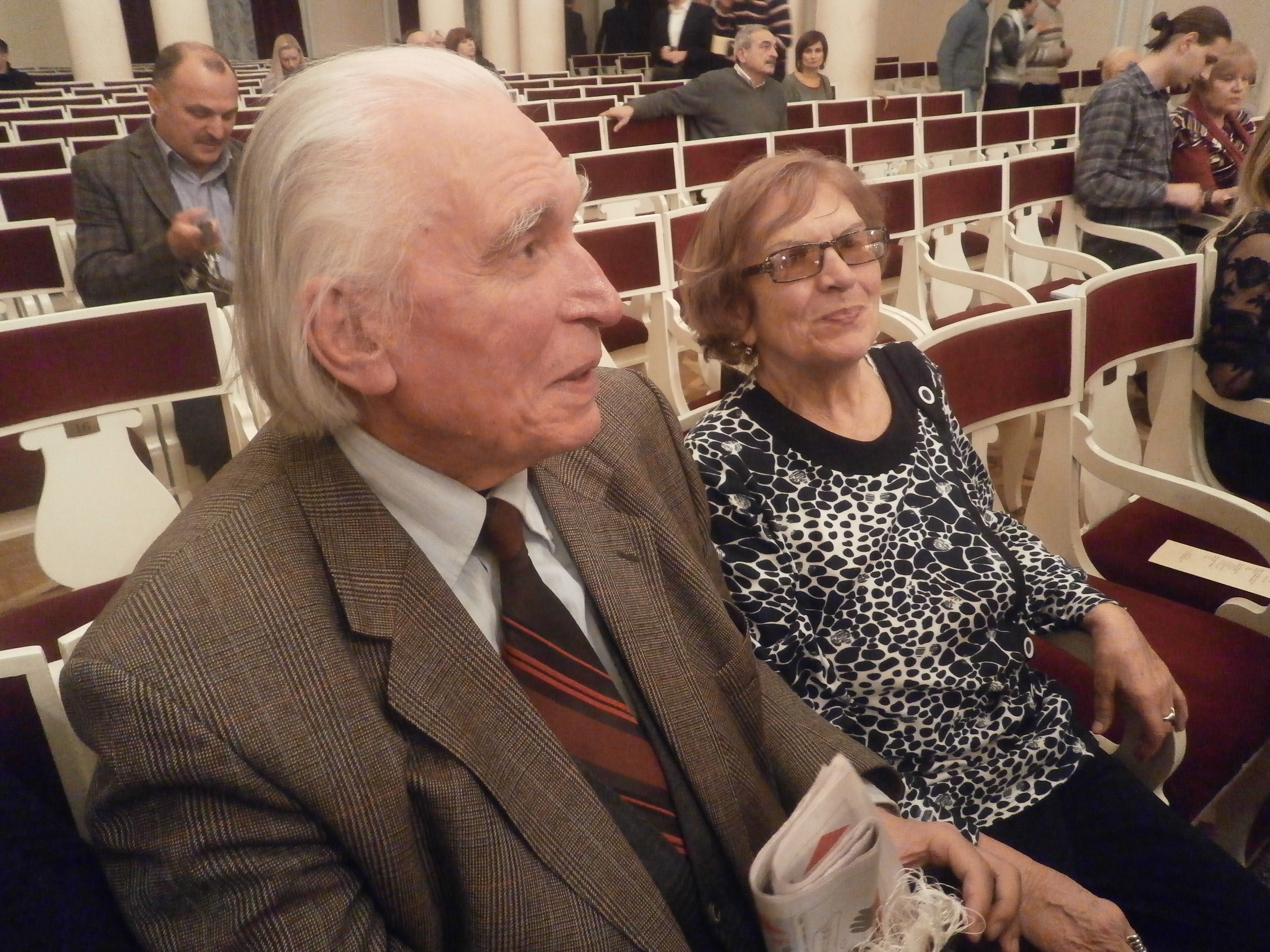
- Kolodub and his wife, Zhanna, in 2015
- Born: 1 May 1930; Kyiv
- Died: 23 February 2019 (aged 88); Kyiv
- Education: Kharkiv Conservatory
- Occupations: Composer; Academic teacher
- Organizations: Kyiv Conservatory; National Union of Composers of Ukraine
- Awards: People's Artist of the USSR; Shevchenko National Prize; Order of Lenin

Lev (Levko) Mykolaiovych Kolodub (Ukrainian: Левко́ Микола́йович Колоду́б; 1 May 1930 – 23 February 2019) was a Ukrainian composer and teacher, Honored Artist of Ukraine (1973), People's Artist of Ukraine (1993), recipient of the Shevchenko National Prize (2010), and head of the Ukrainian Music Foundation (1988—1994) Kyiv branch of National Union of Composers of Ukraine (1994—1999).

== Biography ==
Lev Kolodub was born on 1 May 1930 in Kyiv. His mother was an opera singer, and her grandmother was a music teacher. He studied at the Kharkiv Secondary Specialized Music Boarding School as a clarinetist and later at the Kharkiv Conservatory as a composer. After graduating from the conservatory in 1954 he worked in Kyiv.

From 1958 to 1960 he taught music theory at the Kyiv Theater Institute, and from 1966 he taught at the Kyiv Conservatory, from 1985 as professor. In 1997 he headed a recently established Music Information Technology Department of the Kyiv Conservatory.

From 1994 to 1997 he was the chairman of the Kyiv branch of the National Union of Composers of Ukraine.

He was from 1997 a corresponding member and from 2005 an academic of the Academy of Arts of Ukraine.

Lev Kolodub was married to Zhanna Kolodub, a Ukrainian composer and pianist.

He died on 23 February 2019 in Kyiv at the age of 88.

== Legacy ==
The creative legacy of Levko Kolodub includes 4 operas, 4 operettas, 2 ballets, 12 symphonies, numerous concertos for wind instruments with orchestra, as well as chamber music and music for cinema. Pieces for wind instruments hold a special place and have been highly appreciated by Ukrainian musicians. His symphonic music is based in Ukrainian folklore and usually carries some kind of an agenda. The 9th, 10th and 11th symphonies were awarded with the Shevchenko National Prize. Although he was never part of the avant-garde movement of the 1960s, he was a composer of interesting and colourful music and always a superb craftsman.

=== Selected works ===
Operas

- A Duma about Turbay (Дума про Турбаї, 1951) (Note: "A Duma about Turbay": about the peasant Turbay Rebellion)
- Awakening (Пробудження, 1976)
- Unrequited Love (Незраджена любов, 1985)
- Poet (Поет, 1988)

Operettas

- Merry Girls (Веселі дівчата, co-authored with Zhanna Kolodub, 1968)
- Adventures in Mississippi (Пригоди на Міссісіпі co-authored with Zhanna Kolodub, 1971)
- City of Lovers (Місто закоханих, 1969)
- I love you (Люблю тебе, 1975)

Symphonies

- Symphony № 1, 1958.
- Symphony-Duma № 2, "Shevchenko's images", 1964.
- Symphony № 3, "Symphony in the style of the Ukrainian Baroque", 1980.
- Symphony № 4, "Symphony '86", 1986.
- Symphony № 5, "Pro memoria" (Memory of the victims of terrible disasters in Ukraine), 1990.
- Symphony № 6, "C major and A. Schoenberg", 1999.
- Symphony № 7, "Metamorphoses", 2000 (2nd edition - 2003)
- Symphony № 8, Pryluky (for young performers), 2003.
- Symphony № 9, "New Feelings", 2004.
- Symphony № 10, "According to the sketches of young years", 2005.
- Symphony № 11, New Shores, 2007.
- Symphony № 12, "Zeitheist" ("Spirit of Time").

Concertos for solo instruments and orchestra

- 2 concertos for horn and orchestra (1972, 1980),
- 2 concertos for trumpet and orchestra (1982, 1996),
- 2 concertos for trombone and orchestra (1986, 1997),
- Concerto for 2 violins and orchestra (1988),
- 2 concertos for violin and orchestra (1992, 2000),
- 2 concertos for clarinet and orchestra (1995, 2004),
- Concerto for bassoon and orchestra (1997),
- Concerto for oboe and orchestra (1997),
- Concertino for 2 French horns (Ukrainian, 1982),
- Concertino for the tube (Epic, 1986),
- Concertino for 4 saxophones (1985),
- Concertino for oboe (2001)
