= Anton Solomoukha =

Ukrainian-French artist (1945–2015)

Anton P. Solomoukha
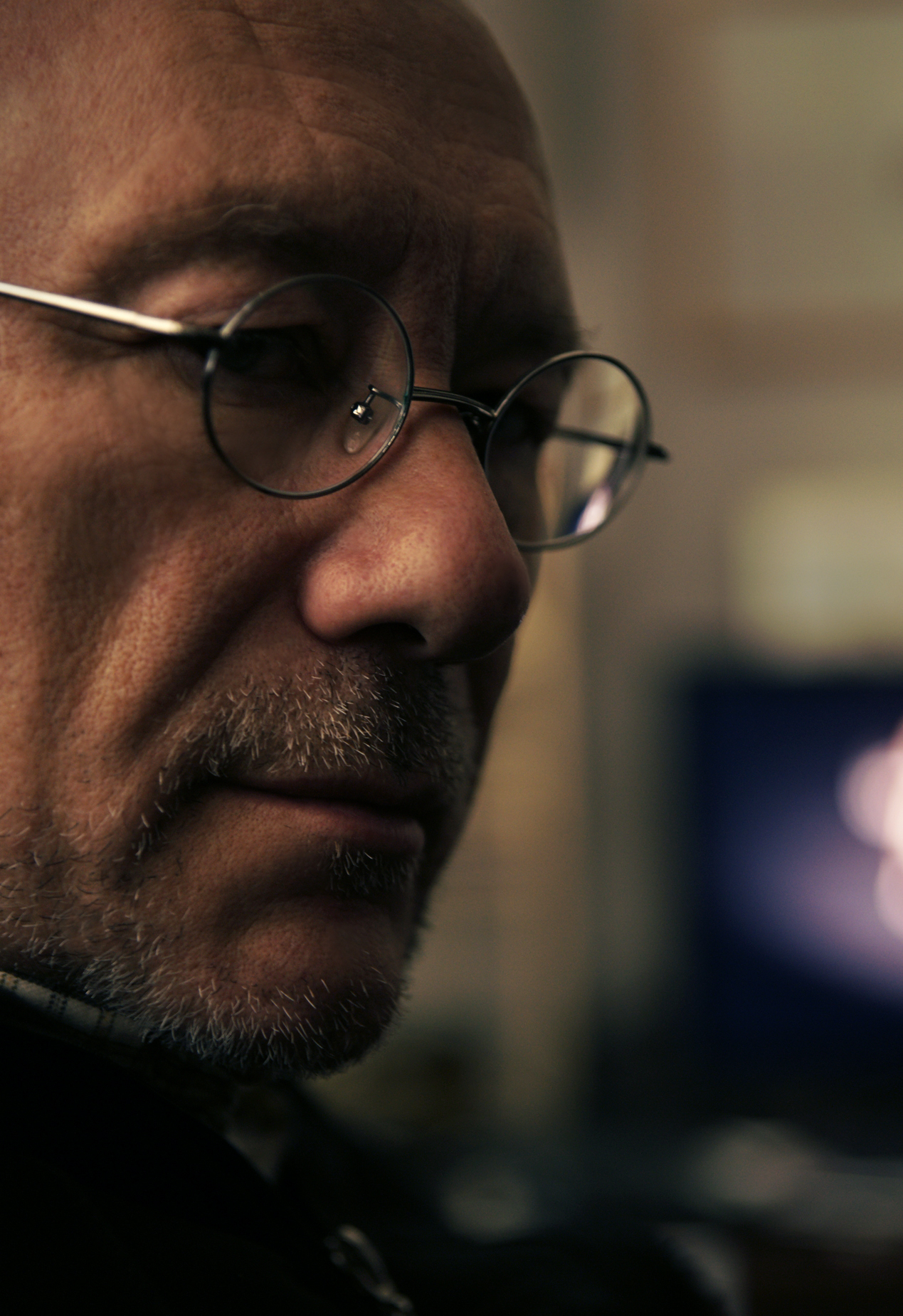
- Solomoukha in 2001
- Born: 2 November 1945; Kyiv, Ukraine
- Died: 21 October 2015 (aged 69)

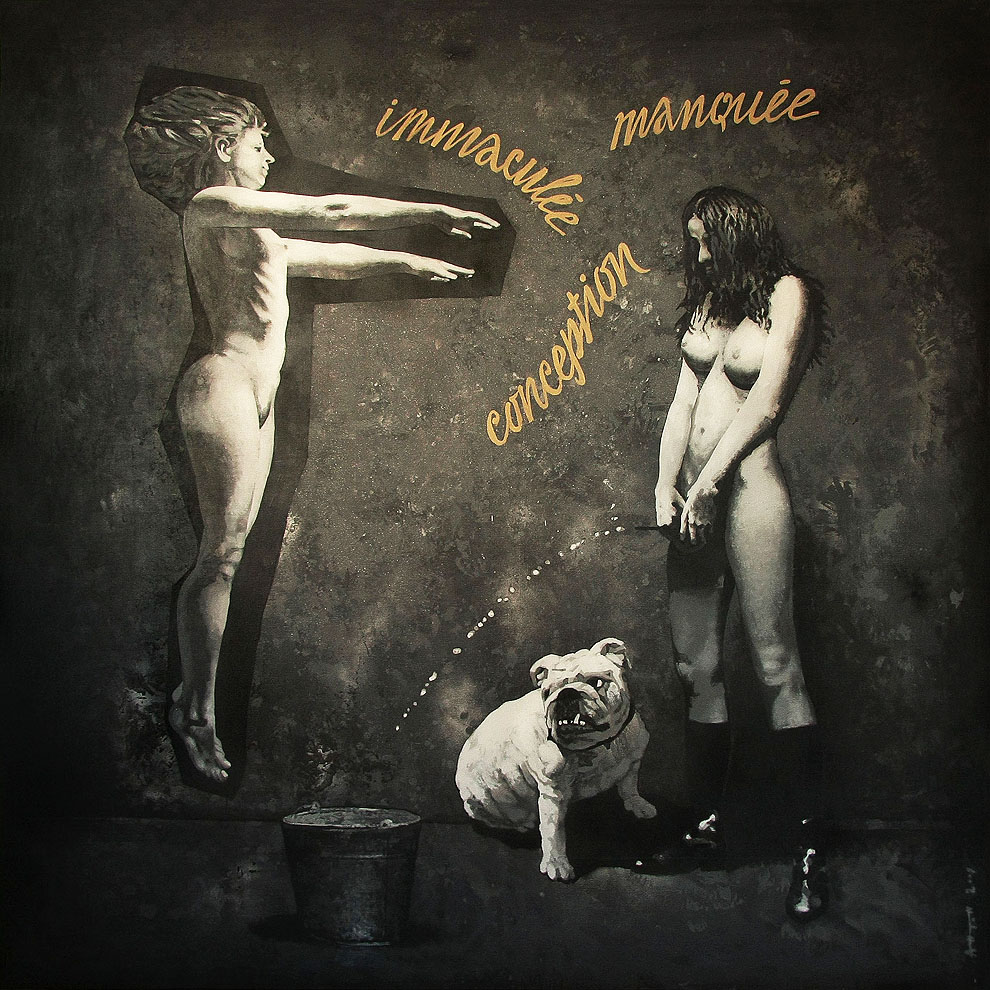
The Myths and the Limits. Failed Immaculate Conception. 179x179cm.

Anton (Anatole) P. Solomoukha (Ukrainian: Антон Соломуха 2 November 1945 – 21 October 2015) was a Ukrainian-born French artist and photographer, and a foreign member of the Ukrainian Academy of Arts. From 1980, he specialized in narrative figuration. After 2000, he developed photo projects and is known as the inventor of a new form of expression in contemporary photography: “Photo painting”. In it, he associates the photographic image with pictorial research in tableaux frequently requiring a multitude of models.

== Biography ==
Solomoukha was born in Kyiv, Ukraine (then part of the USSR). His father, Pavel Davidovich Solomoukha, was a veteran of the Second World War. In 1943, following the liberation of Ukraine, he was given the job of recruiting and organizing the training of teachers in a department under the Secretariat of Nikita Khrushchev, who later became the first secretary of the Communist Party of the Soviet Union. His mother, Galina von Krigin, was a teacher.

After completing his secondary education and doing his military service, Solomoukha entered the Faculty for the Restoration of Icons in the Kyiv School of Fine Art. It was here that he familiarized himself with philosophy and religion. In 1971, Solomoukha was admitted to the studio workshop of the academician T. Yablonska, and in 1973, he obtained a diploma as a 'Monumentalist' painter.

Between 1975 and 1978, his dissident creative expression attracted the attention of political censors, and he was summoned to appear before the KGB on several occasions.

In 1978, he succeeded in immigrating to France.

== Work ==
=== Painting ===
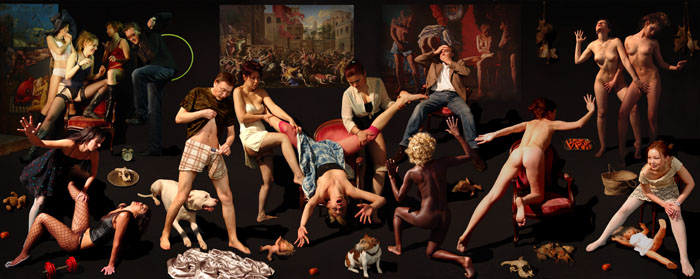
Petit Chaperon Rouge visite le Grand Louvre. 72x180. 2008. Nicolas Poussin. Rape of the Sabine Women

Between 1978 and 1980, Solomoukha began a period of experimentation with various techniques and types of aesthetic formulas. A trip to the United States in 1978–1980 proved to be a decisive moment in his artistic career. In 1980, he exhibited in New York City, Boston, Cleveland, Washington, and Philadelphia. In 1981, 1982, and 1983, he was invited by violinist Gidon Kremer to be the stage designer at the Lockenhaus Chamber Music Festival in Austria. In 1985, his project "Les Grands Mythes" drew the attention of Cologne gallery owner Thomas Krings-Ernsta, and Solomoukha exhibited there regularly until 1989. In 1988, two paintings were acquired by Cologne's Ludwig Museum for its French Collection.

=== Photography ===
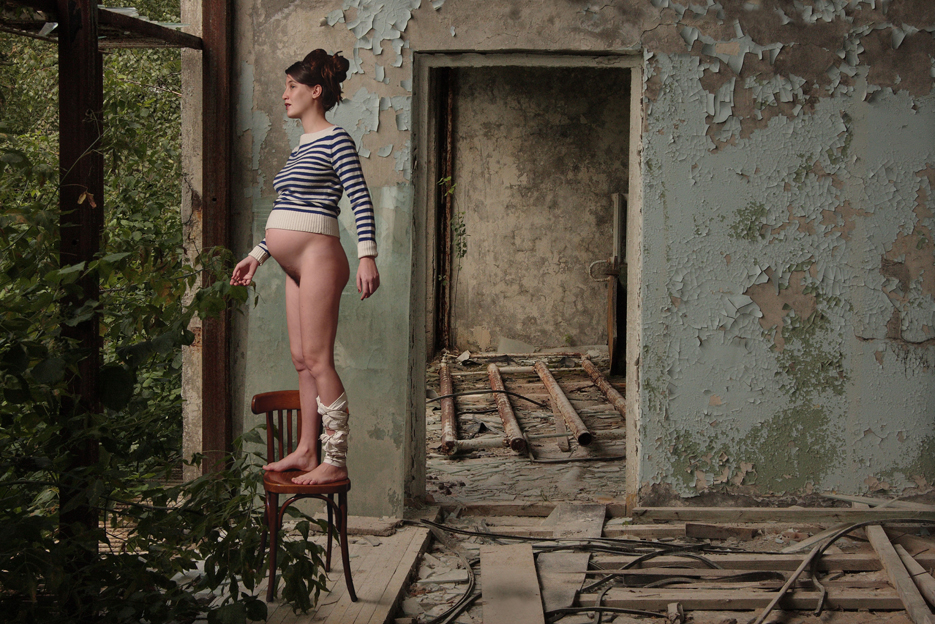
Mona Lisa di Antonio Maria (Antonmaria) Gherardini del Giocondo

In the 1990s, Solomoukha became interested in photography. In 1990, he was acquainted with Robert Doisneau, and in 1995, he began working with Henri Cartier-Bresson.

In 2009, Solomoukha continued to refer to classical art in his project "Little Red Riding Hood visits Chernobyl".
