= House of the Gospel, Lutsk =

House of the Gospel
- Baptist Church "House of the Gospel" in Lutsk
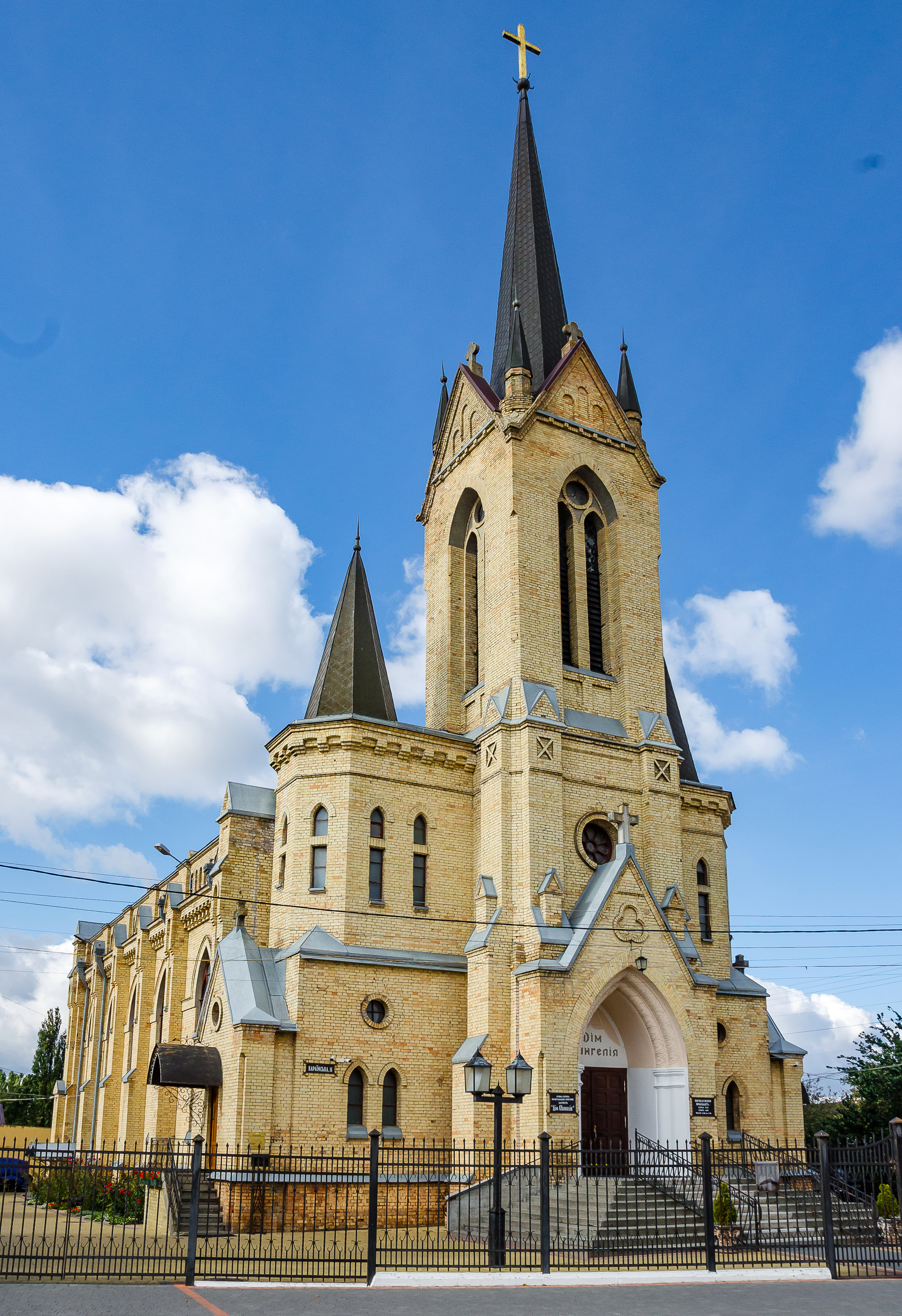
- House of the Gospel
- 50°44′17″N 25°18′57″E
- Location: Lutsk
- Country: Ukraine
- Denomination: Evangelical Baptist Union of Ukraine
- Website: Kirche in Lutsk

History
- Status: active
- Consecrated: 1907

Architecture
- Architect: Christian Beutelspacher
- Style: Gothic Revival architecture
- Years built: 1905–1907

Immovable Monument of Local Significance of Ukraine
- Official name: Будинок пастора (House of the Gospel)
- Type: Architecture
- Reference no.: 2399-Вл

House of the Gospel in Lutsk, Ukraine, is a Baptist church. It is located in "Old Lutsk", the historical and architectural part of the city.

The Church was built in 1907 for the city's Lutheran community. From the time it was built, it was the principal place of worship for the Germans living in Volyn. The church fell into decline as a result of the Second World War. From the 1950s to the 1980s, the church was used as an archive. Restoring the church in 1990s, the Baptist community of Lutsk became the new owner of the church after Church Restitution in Ukraine in the early 1990s. The spire of the Lutheran Church is the most significant feature of the church's architecture.

== History ==
In the 18th century, the Carmelite Catholic church of the Virgin Mary was built on the site. In 1741, Anatol Bazalski donated 19,000 zloty for the church and for the Carmelite community from the village of Borokhiv. The church was built in the Baroque style. The walls and ceiling were adorned with frescos. Damaged by fire, the church was rebuilt in 1764. After being totally gutted by fire in 1845, the building lay in ruins for a period until the debris was removed, leaving small fragments of the walls and the foundations.

Following annexation to the Russian Empire in 1795, Volyn was colonised by Germans thanks to the encouragement of the Russian government which sought to extend agriculture and industry. The German colonies grew rapidly in the 1870s and 1880s. As most Germans were Lutherans, permission to build a new church was sought from the Lutsk authorities who made the site of the former Carmelite church available.

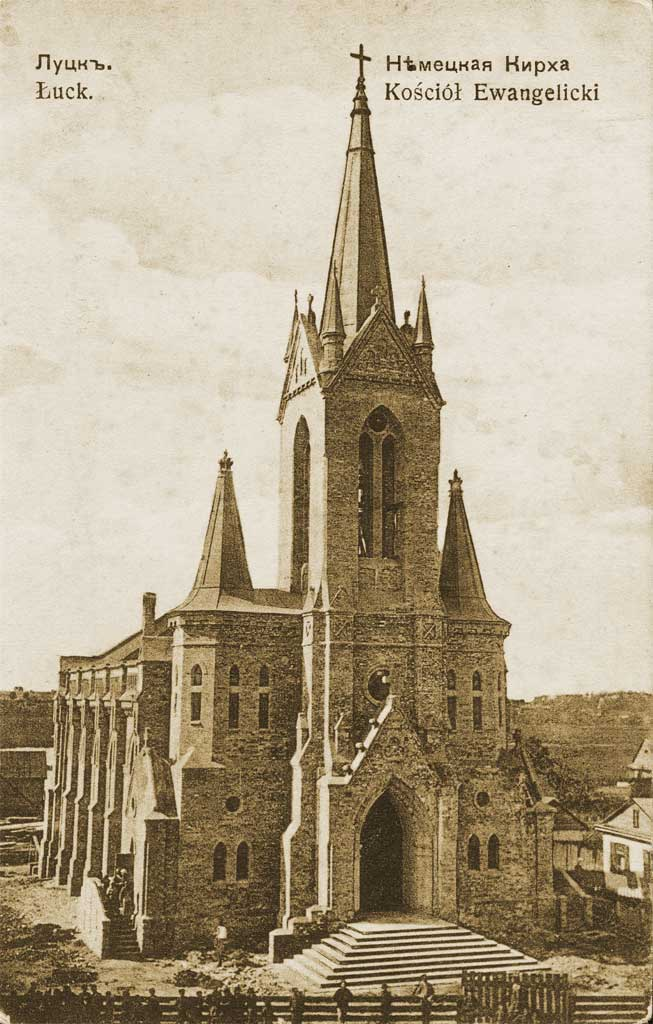
Church before WWI

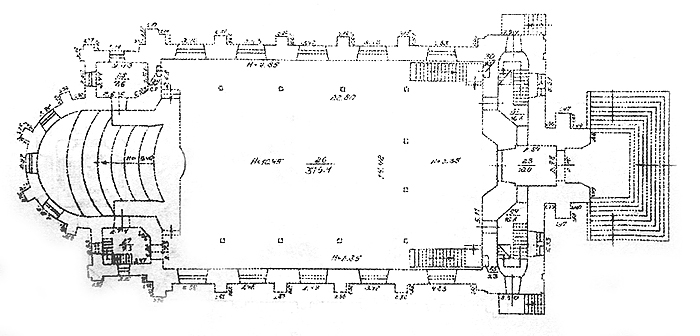
Plan

Initially, Lutsk and Torchyn competed to have the new church. Although Torchyn had hundreds of Germans, the church administration preferred Lutsk as it was closer to the administrative institutions and to the railway. Construction of church to the design of architect Christian Beutelspacher began on 25 June 1905 in the idiom of Gothic Revival architecture. With the help of members of the Lutheran community, the building was completed 15 months later.

A large bell from the German city Bochum was placed in the central tower. An organ with 16 registers from the Austrian firm (Gebrüder Rieger was installed. The church's single nave was brightly illuminated with high lancet windows. The three altar windows were decorated. Bertel Thorvaldsen's picture of Christ filled the central window. Work on decorating the interior continued until 1911.

In 1914 Sigismund Loppe (born on 12 February 1872) was the adjunct pastor of the Lutheran congregation of Lutsk.

The church was damaged in the First World War. In 1921, A. Kleindienst became the new pastor. In accordance with the Peace of Riga, Volyn became part of the Second Polish Republic. Volyn Voivodeship was restored. The Lutheran adjuncture of Lutsk was confirmed by the Polish Lutheran consistory of Warsaw In 1927, the rectory and school were built near the church. In 1929, Ignacy Mościcki, president of the Second Polish Republic, visited the church.

The Soviet and German authorities agreed to evict German colonists from Volyn during the Second World War. The Lutheran Church was therefore left without a congregation. In 1951, it was reconstructed as an archive. The tall spire was destroyed by a hurricane in 1960 and the roof was gutted by fire in 1972. Some architectural features were removed.

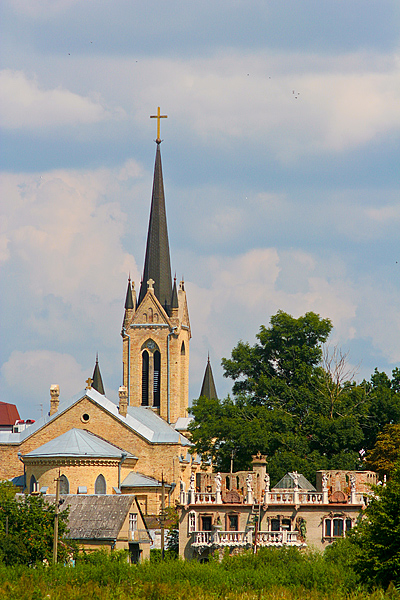
Church and Holovan house

Restoring the church in 1990s, the Baptist community of Lutsk became the new owner as a result of the terms of the Church Restitution in Ukraine. The dusty brickwork was cleaned and war damage was repaired. The community restored the spire and installed a cross on the central bell spire. Interior restoration included a new altar, carved furniture, balconies and a pulpit. The bricked-up windows of the apse were restored. New stained glass windows were designed by Olexandr Yurchenko.

== Architecture ==
The church was built in a non-plastered Neogothic style using yellow bricks 27х13х7 cm made by "Łuczanin", a local brickworks. The building consists of a single nave with a bell tower above entrance portal|. The pulpit stands to the left of the altar. The altar itself is located in an apse while an amphitheatre structure accommodates the choir. There is no longer a pipe organ. The entrance consists of a portal with a lancet profile with a steep pediment. The height of central spire is 24 m. It is visually supported by lower lateral spires located above the narthex. The tall bell tower and spire are an important feature of the old town.

== Gallery ==
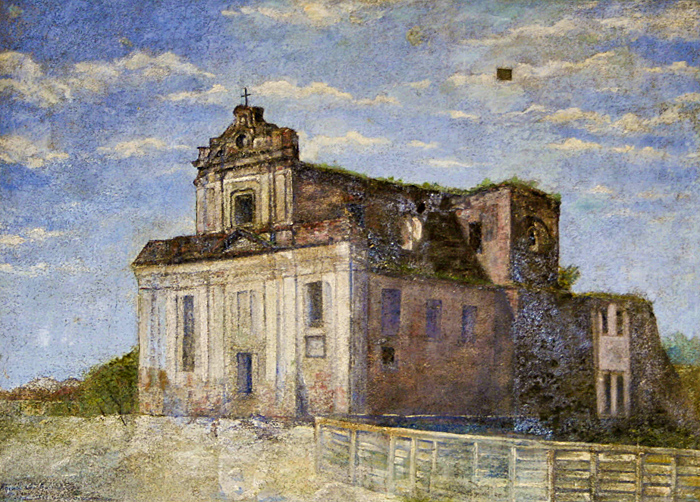
Carmelite church. Painting from the cathedral

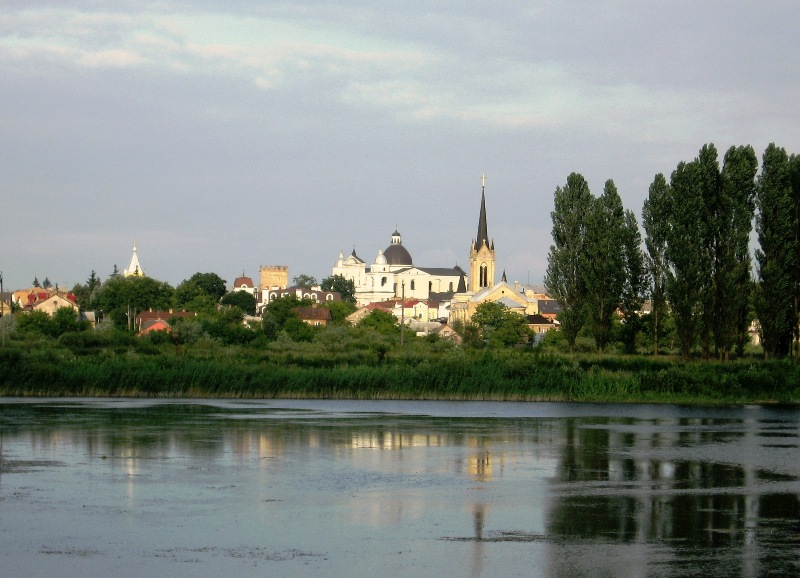
Lutsk old town

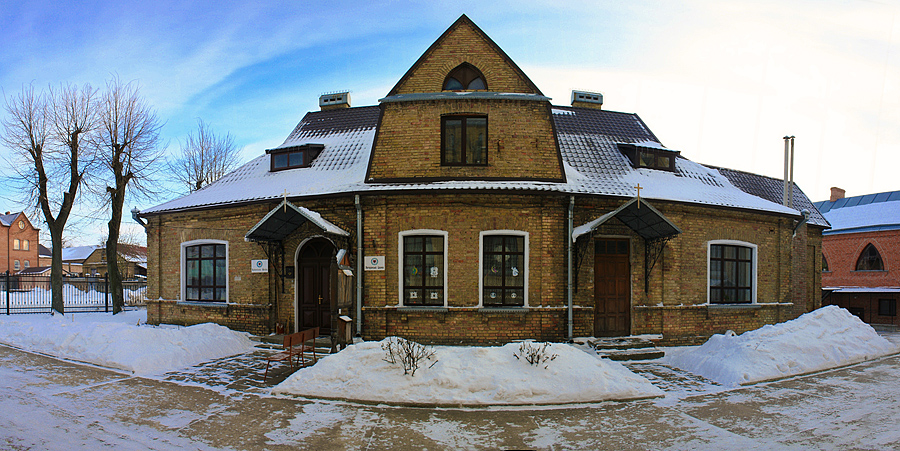
Rectory

== Sources ==
- Baptist Church «House of the Gospel» in Lutsk
- Kneifel, Eduard: «Die evangelisch-augsburgischen Gemeinden in Polen 1555–1939», Selbstverlag des Verfassers, Vierkirchen 1971
- The Society for German Genealogy in Eastern Europe
- Костюк М. Євангелічно-лютеранська церква в Луцьку: історико-архітектурний нарис. – Луцьк, 2010 ISBN 978-617-517-033-5
