= Fedir Ernst =

Ukrainian art historian (1891–1942)

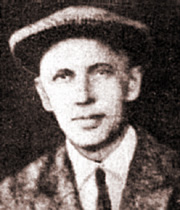
Fedir Ernst

Fedir Ernst (Ukrainian: Федір Ернст; born Theodor Richard Eduard Ernst, 9 November (O.S. 28 October) 1891 - 28 October 1942) was a Ukrainian art historian, museologist and cultural activist. Among his most notable works is a tour guide around Kyiv published in 1930. He was a member of Shevchenko Scientific Society, Historical Society of Nestor the Chronicler, Ukrainian Society of Plastic Arts., All-Ukrainian Archaeological Society of the Ukrainian Academy of Sciences.

== Biography ==
Fedir (Theodor Richard Eduard) Ernst was born on 28 October (9 November according to the new style) 1891 in Kyiv, then part of the Russian Empire in a family of German colonists. In 1900-1909 he attended a gymnasium in Hlukhiv. In 1909-1910 Ernst studied at the philosophical faculty of Berlin University, and in 1910-1914 he studied art history at the University of Kyiv. During this time he worked at the library and art gallery of the Academy of Arts, and co-operated with a number of magazines, creating a paper on the architecture of Kyiv in the 17-18th centuries.

In Kyiv Ernst was close to the circle of Ukrainian Hromada members Mykola Biliashivskyi and Dmytro Doroshenko and took part in meetings of revolutionary societies. Due to his ethnic origin, after the start of the First World War he was exiled to Chelyabinsk in Siberia, and could only return to his native city after the February Revolution of 1917. During the Ukrainian Revolution Ernst worked at the General Secretariate of Education.

Under the Soviet rule in the 1920s, he became a professor of the Archaeological Institute and the Institute of Arts in Kyiv and took part in the commissions to organize a number of museums, among them the Municipal Painting Gallery and the Museum of Arts of the Academy of Sciences (now Khanenko Museum). Ernst also took part in the restoration works at the Saint Sophia Cathedral. In 1926-1930 he headed the regional inspectorate for protection of cultural monuments. In 1929 he became a member of the commission on exchange of valuable objects of culture between Soviet Ukraine and Soviet Russia

After the beginning of Stalinist repressions, in 1933 Ernst was fired from the Ukrainian Historical Museum, where he had worked for 11 years, arrested and accused of "counter-revolutionary activities". On 29 May 1934 the scientist was sentenced to three years of penal labour at the construction of the White Sea-Baltic Canal. During his sentence, Ernst founded the White Sea-Baltic Canal Construction Museum in Povenets and took part in the creation of Moscow-Volga Canal Construction Museum in Dmitrov. After the end of his sentence, Ernst was banned from returning to Ukraine and settled in Kazakhstan, where he worked as deputy director of Kazakh National Gallery in Alma-Ata. From 1938 to 1941 he worked at the State Arts Museum of Bashkiria in Ufa. During this time, his wife Tamara was arrested. On 16 July 1941 Ernst himself was arrested in Ufa on accusation of spying for Nazi Germany. On 28 October 1942 he was executed.

== Notable works ==
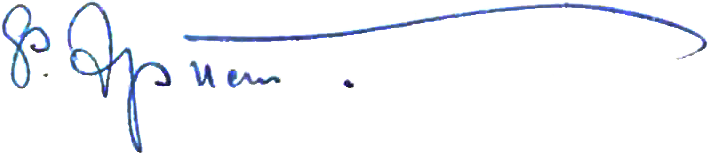
Ernst's signature

- Kyiv Architects of the 18th century (Київські архітекти 18 в., 1918)
- Ukrainian Art of the 17th-18th centuries (Українське мистецтво 17 — 18 вв, 1919)
- Ukrainian Portrait Painting of the 17th-20th centuries (Український портрет 17 — 20 вв., 1925)
- Heorhiy Narbut: Posthumous Exhibition of Works (Георгій Нарбут. Посмертна виставка творів, 1926)
- Kyiv architecture of the 17th century (Київська архітектура 17 в., 1926)
- Kyiv and its Outskirts (Київ та його околиця..., 1926)
- Ukrainian Painting of the 17th-20th centuries (Укр. малярство 17 — 20 ст., 1929)

== Memory ==
Fedir Ernst was posthumously exonerated. Today he is considered to be one of the founders of art history in Ukraine. In 1995 a street was named after him in Kyiv.
