= Erich Saling =

German gynaecologist and obstetrician (1925–2021)

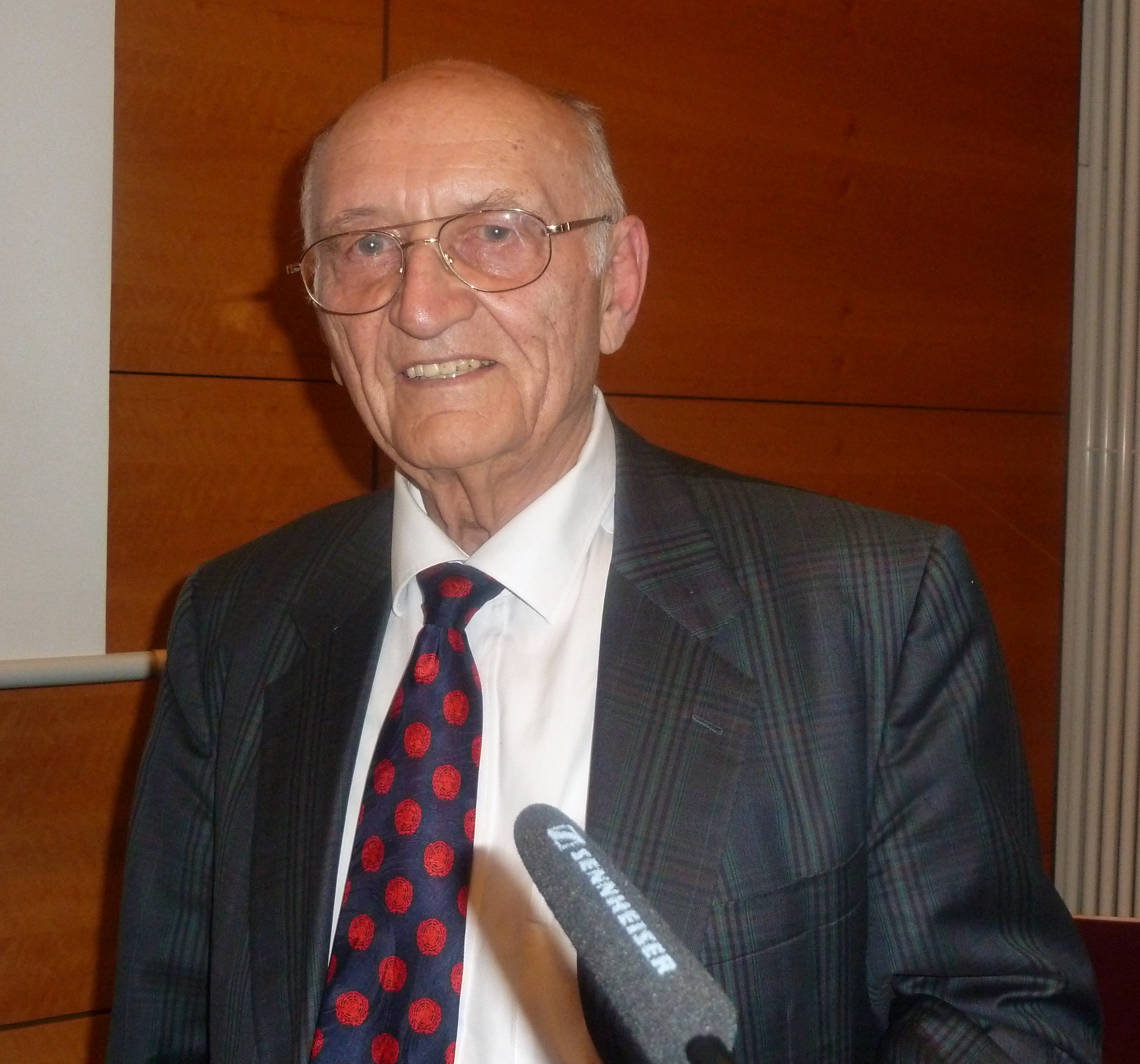
- Saling in 2011
- Born: 21 July 1925; Stanislau, Poland
- Died: 6 November 2021 (aged 96)
- Occupations: Pioneering obstetrician University professor
- Spouse: Hella Weymann (1925–2006)
- Children: Peter (1954); Michael (1955)
- Parent(s): Heinrich Saling; Emma Hoffmann

Erich Saling (21 July 1925 – 6 November 2021) was a pioneering German gynaecologist and midwifery professional. Many sources identify him as "the father of perinatal medicine": one even identifies him as the originator of the term "perinatal medicine". He was involved in a number of "firsts", among which the most frequently cited occurred in 1960 when he used blood gas analyses to assess the effectiveness of resuscitation procedures in respect of new-born infants. In 1961 Saling teamed up with K. Damaschke to develop a high-speed approach to testing for perinatal blood-oxygen levels and foetal blood analysis.

== Life ==
Erich Saling was born in the city known, at that time, as Stanislau, at that time a multi-ethnic city in Poland. (In 1939 the city and surrounding region became the Ukrainian Soviet Socialist Republic.) His father, Heinrich Saling, worked in forestry as a regional manager. It seems to have been from his father that Erich Saling inherited or learned a valuable set of hands-on craft skills. His mother, born Emma Hoffmann, had been born in Stanislau region, albeit during the nineteenth century when it was part of the Austrian province of Galicia (Eastern Europe). The family were registered as Protestants.

Saling passed his "Abitur" (school leaving exam) in or before 1943, which in normal times would have opened the way to university admission, but the times were far from normal. Between 1943 and 1945 he was conscripted for military service. In 1945 he enrolled as a medical student at the University of Jena, which after 1945 found itself administered as part of the Soviet occupation zone (relaunched in October 1949 as the Soviet sponsored German Democratic Republic / East Germany). Between 1945 and 1952 he studied at Jena and at Berlin. (Note: Sources are defiantly silent or ambiguous over whether the Berlin University at which Erich Saling studied between 1945 and 1952 (except when he was studying at Jena) was the so-called (till 1945) Friedrich Wilhelm University founded in 1810, which was in the part of Berlin that was included in the Soviet occupation zone or the Free University of Berlin founded in 1948, "with American support", in the part of the city that during the 1950s became known as West Berlin. He may have been a student at both institutions in succession. In any event, at some point between 1945 and 1952 he must have moved from "East Berlin" to "West Berlin".)

In 1952 Erich Saling married fellow-physician Hella Weymann. This was also the year in which Saling obtained his professional "Approbation" in Berlin, receiving his doctorate from the Free University of (West) Berlin that same year. His doctoral dissertation concerned "Syphilis as a cause of premature births and miscarriages" ("Lues als Abort- und Frühgeburtsursache"). At the end of 1952 he embarked on his mandatory hands-on probationary posting ("Pflichtassistentenzeit") at the City Hospital (as the "Vivantes Clinic" was known at that time) in Berlin-Neukölln. He continued to be based in Neukölln between 1954 and 1958, working as an assistant hospital doctor while training in Gynaecology and Midwifery at the (then separate) Neukölln Women's Clinic.

In 1958 Saling qualified in the specialisms of Gynaecology and Midwifery. During the post-war period these were not fashionable specialisms among junior doctors, and Saling had demonstrated a certain level of stubborn persistence in getting to this point. At the same time he embarked on what became a new life-long research programme in various complementary and over-lapping forms of perinatal medicine. While still in the final phase of his training period he had applied his hands-on craft skills to constructing a simple machine that could both blow oxygen into the lungs of new-born infants and suck out mucus from their breathing systems. He also "discovered the foetus as a patient", deserving of treatment, rather than simply as an after-effect of pregnancy. His expression of that attitude, subsequently mainstream, would have given many more traditionalist colleagues pause for thought. His radical attitudes in this respect were on public display in his first book "Das Kind im Bereich der Geburtshilfe" (loosely, "The Child in the context of obstetrics"): he was acutely conscious that "the period around an individual's birth is the most dangerous stage of life". Saling never got weary of reiterating this truth as he expanded his teaching activities, which, according to his many fans in the field, prior generations of doctors had a tendency to ignore.

In 1963, again from the Free University of Berlin, Saling received his habilitation degree, which confirmed his eligibility for a life-long academic career which, in Saling's case, would be combined with his role as a distinguished and exceptionally inventive hospital physician. This time his dissertation concerned "The balance of gases in the blood and the base-acid balance of the foetus in an undisturbed birth" . (Note: "Die Blutgasverhältnisse und der Säure-Basenhaushalt des Feten bei ungestörtem Geburtsablauf") That was followed in 1968 with an extraordinary ("außerplanmäßig") professorship. (Note: This form of professorship provided for a level of flexibility in respect of teaching scheduling that would not normally have been compatible with a standard "full professorship".) It was not until 1976, however, that he was appointed head of the Free University's Institute for Perinatal Medicine and head of Obstetrics at the Neukölln City Hospital. In 1987 he was appointed C-4 professor (senior professor) in Perinatal Medicine at the Free University. Following reunification and the ensuring restructuring of university medicine in Berlin Erich Saling became University Professor for Perinatal Medicine for the greatly expanded Charité hospital network. In 1991, however, having passed the age of 65, he retired from his career in the university hierarchy, succeeded in his university professorship by Klaus Vetter. His contributions to medical research in the field of obstetrics were not quite an end, however.

In 1993 he founded the "Erich Saling Institute for Perinatal Medicine", a Nonprofit organization based in Berlin and described in its own publicity as "a supra-regional consultation center with emphasis on the prevention of preterm births .... [and contributing in a number of other ways] significantly to the improvement of prenatal care".

== The pioneer ==
Erich Saling repeatedly developed new methods of early problem identification and treatment procedures designed to reduced infant mortality and preterm birth levels. In 1958, for instance, he catheterized the aorta of a new-born infant directly following birth and developed a new method for faster placental blood transfusion with early cord cutting. It was in 1960 that he first used blood gas analyses to assess the effectiveness of resuscitation procedures for new-born infants. In 1961 he teamed up with K. Damaschke to develop a high-speed approach to testing for perinatal blood-oxygen levels and foetal blood analysis. This was the first time that direct diagnostic access to a foetus in the womb had become available.

In 1962 Saling developed the "Fruchtwasserspiegelung" (amnioscope), enabling vulnerable late-stage foetuses to be identified and, where necessary, appropriate interventions to be performed. In 1965 he introduced clinical-biological condition diagnoses that were performed on new-born babies immediately following birth. In 1972 he succeeded in performing a directly postnatal Esophagogastroduodenoscopy. In 1978 he introduced continual vaginal disinfectant measures in order to avoid ascending infections in the event of amniorrhexis during later-stage pregnancy. That was also the year in which, together with his colleague U. Blücher, he came up with a device for monitoring premature labour in the home from a distance - in this case a hospital or clinic - using a telephone. In 1981 he developed the "Frühe Totale Muttermund-Verschluss" (FTMV), (Note: The Erich Saling Institute describes and then translates the description into English as "early total operative occlusion of the external os uteri".) a new method for the avoidance of recurring miscarriages and premature births. In 1984, together with U. Blücher and J. Rothe, Erich Saling created microphone recordings of the acoustic background context of the Uterus during childbirth. In 1989 Saling developed a pre-term birth prevention programme suitable for routine application. Then in 1993, shortly after his retirement from the Free University, he launched a self-care action for pregnant women keen to avoid late-stage abortions and pre-term births. In 1999/2000 he developed a new method for patients to determine for themselves the pH-value of vaginal secretions, using an "Indicator Coated Panty Liner".

Although it is to be hoped that the previous two paragraphs will provide a reasonable insight into the nature and extent of the innovations ascribed to Erich Saling, they are not intended to be comprehensive. The Berlin-based "Erich Saling-Institut für Perinatale Medizin e. V." has placed a longer schedule of Saling's perinatal "firsts" online, however.

== Personal life ==
Erich Saling's marriage to Hella Weymann (1925–2006) in 1952 was followed by the births of their sons Peter (1954) and Michael (1955). There are also six grandchildren and, at the last count, seven great-grandchildren. Peter is a gynaecologist and Michael is a businessman.
