= Mykola Biliashivskyi =

Ukrainian archaeologist, ethnographer, and art historian (1867–1926)

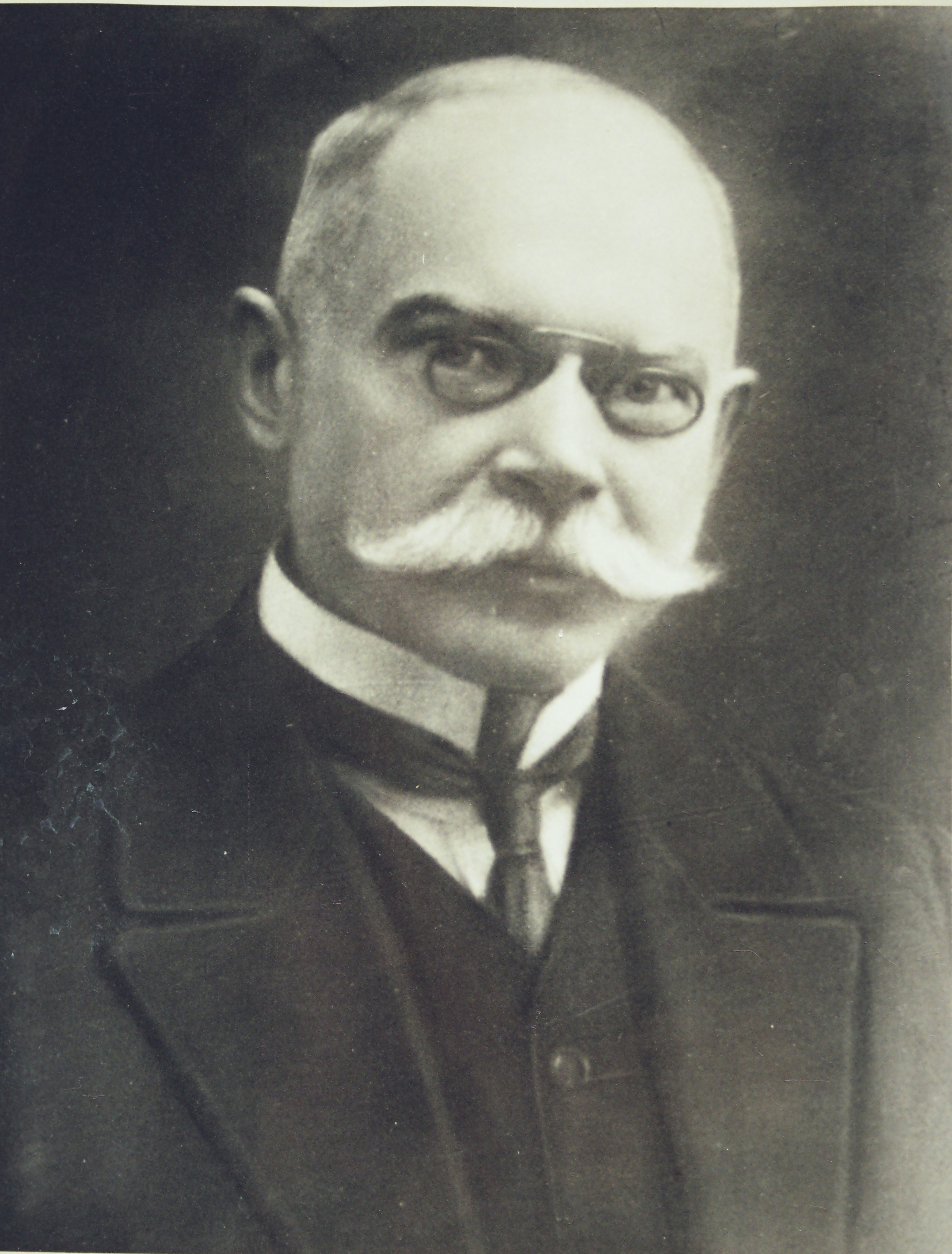
Biliashivsky in 1912

Mykola Fedotovych Biliashivskyi (Note: Sometimes transliterated as Biliashivsky) (Ukrainian: Микола Федотович Біляшівський; 24 October 1867, Uman – 21 April 1926, Kyiv) was a Ukrainian archaeologist, ethnographer, and art historian. He was a member of the All-Ukrainian Academy of Sciences and the Shevchenko Scientific Society.

== Biography ==
Biliashivskyi was born in Uman. In 1890 he took part in an archaeological expedition near Kaniv, and later excavated remains of Slavic settlements and burials in Volhynia. In 1904 Biliashivsky studied Trypillian settlements in Borysivka near Kyiv. As a museum organizer, he created the museum of baron Shteingel in Horodok. Between 1902 and 1923 he headed the Historical Museum in Kyiv. In 1899-1901 and again in 1903-1905 he edited the magazine Archaeological Chronicle of South Russia.

In 1906 Biliashivsky was elected to the State Duma, where he represented the Ukrainian Club. During the First World War the Russian Academy of Sciences tasked him with protecting valuable cultural objects in Galicia and Bukovyna. In 1917 he became head of the Central Committee for Protection of Historical and Artistic Valuables in Ukraine.

== Notable works ==
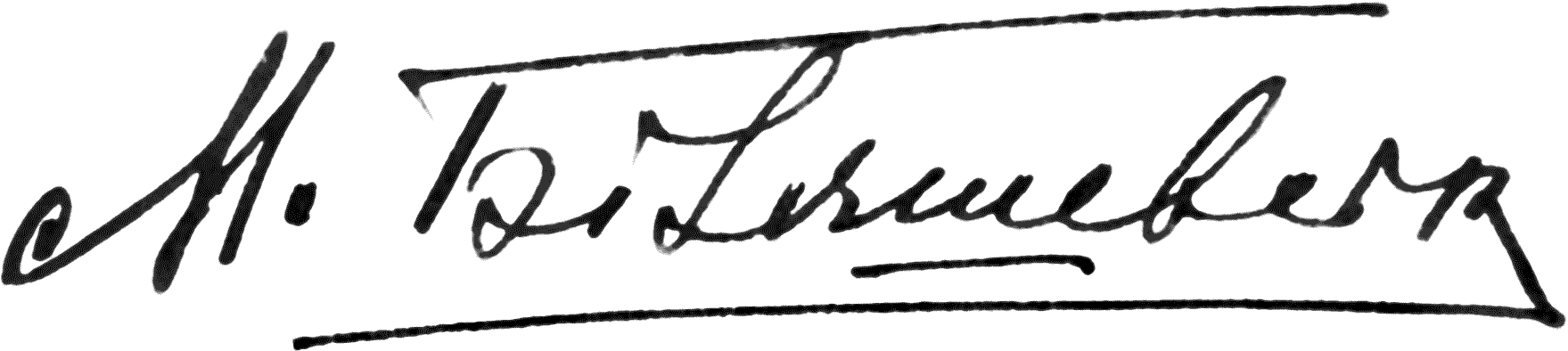
Biliashivsky's signature

- Burial in Ostronia Tract (Могильник в урочище Остроня, Kievskaya Starina, 1888)
- Traces of the Prehistoric Human on the Banks of Dnieper near Kyiv (Следы первобытного человека на берегах р. Днепра вблизи Києва, Materials of the 8th Archaeological Congress)
- Kniazha Hora (Kievskaya Starina, 1890)
- Borysivka Hillfort (Short Messages of the All-Ukrainian Archaeological Committee, 1925)

== See also ==
- Fedir Ernst
