= Volhynian Germans =

Ethnic Germans who settled in Volhynia

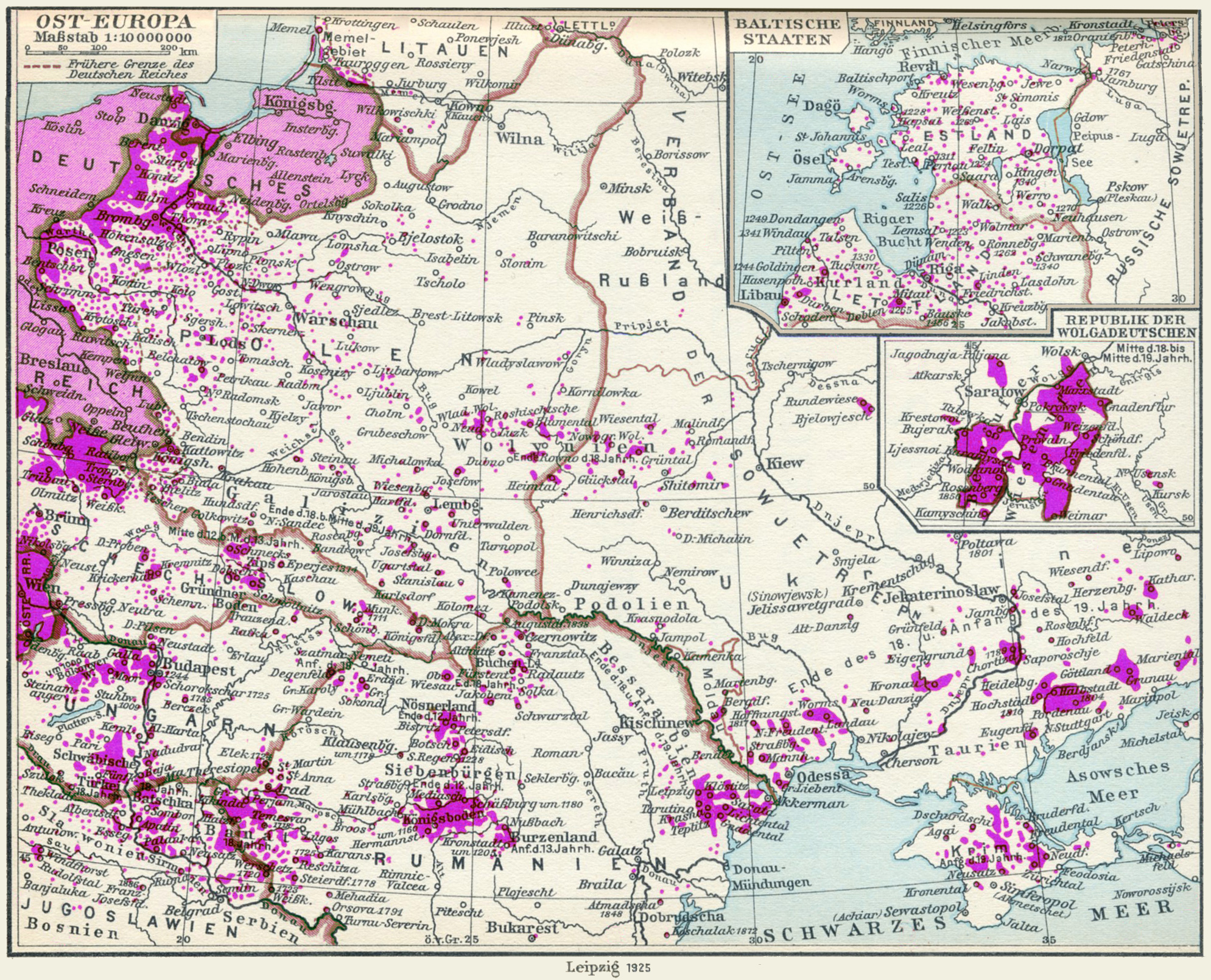
1925 map of German settlements in Eastern Europe, with Volhynian Germans in the center of the map

Volhynian Germans (Ukrainian: Волинські німці) were ethnic Germans who settled in the Volhynia region of the Russian Empire, now part of northwestern Ukraine, from the early 19th century onwards. Their migration was primarily encouraged by Polish landlords seeking to develop agricultural land. The majority of these settlers originated from Congress Poland, with others coming from regions such as East and West Prussia, Pomerania, Posen, Württemberg, and Galicia. Unlike German communities in other parts of the Russian Empire, Volhynian Germans were dispersed across over 1,400 Villages, rather than residing in concentrated colonies. By the turn of the 20th century, their population had grown to approximately 200,000.

== History ==
The settlement of Volhynian Germans in the Volhynia region began in the late 18th and early 19th centuries. Initially, German craftsmen and merchants had settled in the area as early as the 13th century, contributing to the region's cultural development. However, significant colonization efforts commenced in 1816, with the establishment of the first permanent German settlement at Koretz. Subsequent waves of migration occurred in the 1830s and 1860s, driven by factors such as land shortages in their homeland and the encouragement of Polish landlords seeking to develop agricultural land. By 1900, the German population in Volhynia had reached approximately 200,000.

== See also ==
- Germans in Ukraine
