= Nimetska Mokra =

Nimetska Mokra Німецька Мокра
- Village
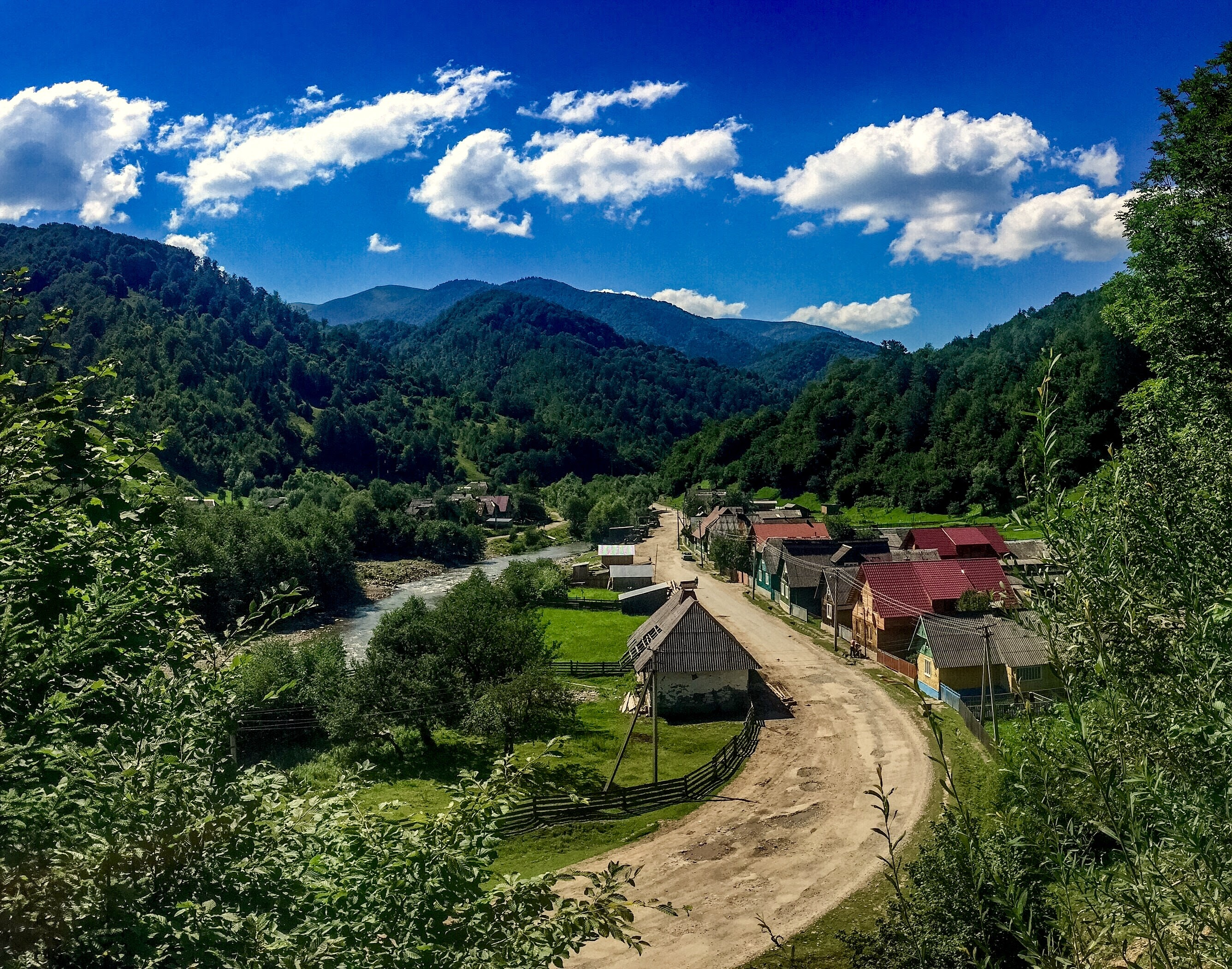
- Interactive map of Nimetska Mokra
- Location within Ukraine Location within Zakarpattia Oblast
- Coordinates: 48°22′37″N 23°50′42″E
- Country: Ukraine
- Oblast: Zakarpattia Oblast
- Raion: Tiachiv Raion
- Hromada: Ust-Chorna settlement hromada

Population (2001)
  - Total: 540

Nimetska Mokra (Ukrainian: Німецька Мокра; German: Deutsch Mokra; Hungarian: Németmokra), from 1946 until 2016 called Komsomolsk Ukrainian: Комсомольськ) is a village in the Tiachiv Raion of Zakarpattia Oblast, Ukraine. As of 2001, its population was 540.
