= Pavlo Muravskyi =

Soviet conductor (1914–2014)

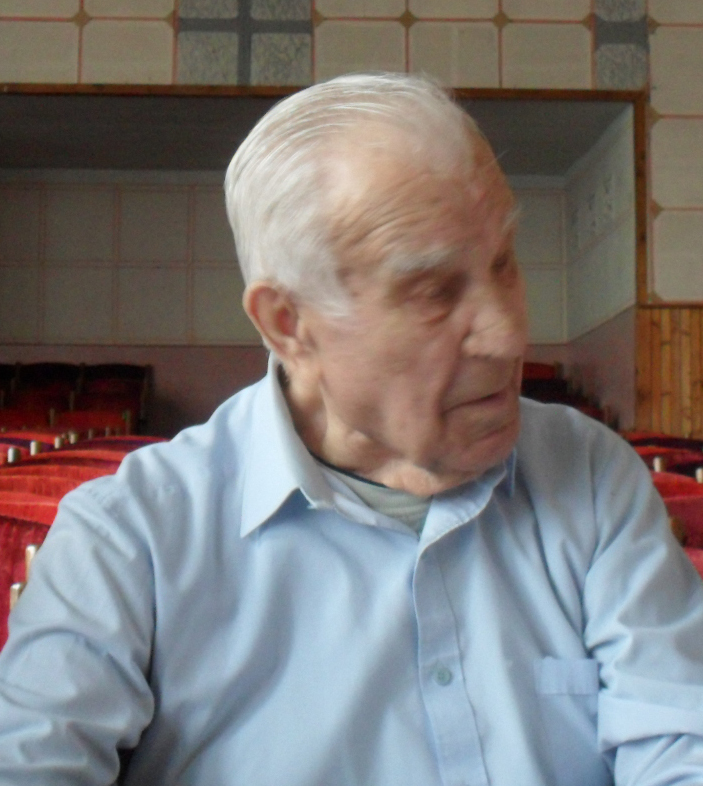
Muravskyi in 2011

Pavlo Ivanovych Muravskyi (Ukrainian: Павло Іванович Муравський; 30 July 1914 – 6 October 2014) was a Soviet and Ukrainian choir conductor and pedagogue.

== Life and career ==
Pavlo Muravskyi was born in 1914 in Dmytrashkivka village. In 1941, he graduated from the Ukrainian National Academy of Music named after Tchaikovsky. He was a band-master at "Dumka" cappella from 1940 to 1941 as well as from 1946 to 1948. From 1949 to 1955, he taught at Lviv Conservatory and again continued his professional activity at the "Dumka" cappella from 1964 to 1969. He died in Kyiv on 6 October 2014, and was buried in the Baikove Cemetery.

The 95th anniversary of Muravskyi's birth and the 75th anniversary of his creative and pedagogical activity were held in December 2009.

== Awards ==
- Hero of Ukraine (March 23, 2009)
- People's Artist of the Ukrainian SSR (1960)
- Shevchenko National Prize (1979)
- Honorary title of the President of Ukraine (September 20, 1994)
- Order of Merit, 2nd class (December 22, 1999)
- Order of Merit, 1st class (July 30, 2004)
- Order of the Red Star (October 14, 1945)
- Order of the Patriotic War, 2nd class (April 6, 1985)
- Order of the Red Banner of Labour (June 30, 1951)
- Medal "For the Victory over Germany in the Great Patriotic War 1941–1945"
- Medal "In Commemoration of the 1500th Anniversary of Kiev"
