= List of Ukrainian artists =

A partial list of notable artists born or active in Ukraine, arranged chronologically with artists born in the same year arranged alphabetically within that year.

== Born before 1800 ==
- Ivan Rutkovych (c.1650-c.1708), icon painter
- Dmitry Levitzky (1735–1822), portrait painter
- Anton Losenko (1737–1773), painter
- Ivan Martos (1754–1835), sculptor
- Vladimir Borovikovsky (1757–1825), painter

== Born 1800 to 1849 ==
- Ivan Soshenko (1807–1876), painter
- Apollon Mokritsky (1810–1870), painter
- Taras Shevchenko (1814–1861), painter, poet
- Kostyantyn Trutovsky (1826–1893), painter
- Alexander Litovchenko (1835–1890), painter
- Wilhelm Kotarbiński (1848–1921), painter
- Arkhip Kuindzhi (1842–1910), landscape painter
- Volodymyr Orlovsky (1842–1914), landscape painter
- Ilya Repin (1844–1930), painter
- Nikolai Yaroshenko (1846–1898), painter
- Leonid Pozen (1849–1921), painter, sculptor

== Born 1850 to 1899 ==
- Nikolai Dmitriyevich Kuznetsov (1850–1930), painter
- Ivan Pohitonov (1850–1923), painter
- Kyriak Kostandi (1852–1921), painter, scholar
- Serhii Vasylkivsky (1854–1917), painter
- Opanas Slastion (1855–1933), graphic artist
- Ivan Seleznyov (1856–1936), painter
- Serhiy Svetoslavsky (1857–1931), landscape painter
- Marie Bashkirtseff (1858–1884), painter, sculptor
- Anton Vasyutinsky (1858–1935), painter, designer
- Mykola Samokysh (1860–1944), painter
- Mykhaylo Berkos (1861–1919), landscape painter
- Mykola Pymonenko (1862–1912), painter
- Ivan Yizhakevych (1864–1962), painter, writer
- David Ossipovitch Widhopff (1867–1933), painter, poster artist
- Pyotr Nilus (1869–1943), painter, writer
- Ivan Trush (1869–1941), painter
- Seraphima Blonskaya (1870–1947), teacher, painter
- Mykola Burachek (1871–1942), Socialist Realism painter
- Vasyl Krychevsky (1873–1952), painter, architect
- Oleksandr Murashko (1875–1919), painter
- Mikhaylo Parashchuk (1878–1963), sculptor
- Boris Vladimirski (1878–1950), painter
- Fedir Krychevsky (1879–1947), painter
- Kazimir Malevich (1879–1935), painter
- Alexander Bogomazov (1880–1930), painter
- Arnold Lakhovsky (1880–1937), painter, sculptor
- David Burliuk (1882–1967), Futurist painter
- Aleksandra Ekster (1882–1949), painter, designer
- Isaak Brodsky (1883–1939), painter
- Alexis Gritchenko (1883–1977), painter
- Vadym Meller (1884–1962), artist, theatre designer
- Oleksii Shovkunenko (1884–1974), painter, teacher
- Sonia Delaunay (1885–1979), cofounder of the Orphism movement
- Wladimir Burliuk (1886–1917), book illustrator
- John D. Graham (1886–1961), painter
- Heorhiy Narbut (1886–1920), graphic designer
- Olga Rozanova (1886–1918), painter
- Alexander Archipenko (1887–1964), sculptor, graphic artist
- Chana Orloff (1888–1968), sculptor
- Victor Palmov (1888–1929), painter
- Nathan Altman (1889–1970), stage designer, book illustrator
- Alexander Osmerkin (1892–1953), painter, graphic artist
- Josif Bokshaj (1891–1976), painter
- Louis Lozowick (1892–1973), painter, printmaker
- Nina Genke-Meller (1893–1954), artist
- Mykhailo Andriienko-Nechytailo (1894–1982), painter, stage designer
- Emmanuel Mane-Katz (1894–1962), painter
- Vasyl Yermylov (1894–1968), painter, designer
- Alexander Khvostenko-Khvostov (1895–1967), artist, stage designer
- Yefim Golyshev (1897–1970), painter, composer
- Vladimir Bobri (1898–1986), illustrator
- Abraham Mintchine (1898–1931), painter
- Grigoriy Dovzhenko (1899–1980), muralist

== Born 1900 to 1949 ==
- Kateryna Vasylivna Bilokur (1900–1961), folk artist
- Manuil Shechtman (1900–1941), painter
- Mykola Hlushchenko (1901–1977), artist
- Donia Nachshen (1903–1987), illustrator and poster artist
- Misha Reznikoff (1905–1971), painter
- Fyodor Pavlovich Reshetnikov (1906–1988), painter
- Ivan Cherinko (1908–1948), painter and co-founder of Sh. Rustaveli Turkmen Art School
- Mychajlo Dmytrenko (1908–1997), painter
- Maria Prymachenko (1908–1997), folk artist
- Sergey Lunov (1909–1978), graphic artist
- Michael Kmit (1910–1981), painter
- Fedir Manailo (1910–1978), artist
- Felix Lembersky (1913–1970), painter
- Boris Nesterenko (1914–1988), painter
- Hanna Shabatura (1914-2004), painter
- Jacques Hnizdovsky (1915–1985), painter, printmaker
- Peter Kapschutschenko (1915-2006), sculptor
- Nikolai Getman (1917–2004), painter
- Yevhen Yehorov (1917–2004), graphic artist
- Tetyana Yablonska (1917–2005), painter
- Mykhaylo Khmelko (1919–1996), painter
- Fyodor Zakharov (1919–1994), painter
- Pyotr Ilyich Bilan (1921–1996), painter and illustrator
- Eugene Garin (1922–1994), seascape painter
- Vladimir Sosnovsky (1922–1990), landscape painter
- Liuboslav Hutsaliuk (1923–2003), painter, graphic artist
- Evgeniy Chuikov (1924–2000), landscape painter
- Anatoliy Nasedkin (1924–1994), painter
- Valentin Galochkin (1928–2006), sculptor
- Michael Matusevitch (1929–2007), painter
- Halyna Zubchenko (1929–2000), painter, muralist
- Leonid Mezheritski (1930–2007), painter
- Emma Andijewska (born 1931), poet and painter
- Oksana Zhnikrup (1931–1993), ceramicist
- Mykhaylo Chornyi (born 1933), genre painter
- Boris Ginsburg (1933–1963), painter and graphic artist
- Myroslava Kot (1933–2014), applied arts
- Mikhail Turovsky (born 1933), painter, writer
- Mykola Lebid (1936–2007), painter, graphic artist, designer
- Oles Semernya (1936–2012), Ukrainian naïve painter
- Ivan Marchuk (born 1936), painter
- Sychev, Stanislav I. (1937–2003), painter
- Mykola Ivanovych Tseluiko (1937–2007), painter, textile artist
- Roman Bezpalkiv (1938–2009), painter
- Eduard Gudzenko (1938–2009), painter
- Oleg Minko (1938–2013), painter, teacher
- Mykola Shmatko (1943–2020), sculptor
- Anton Solomoukha (1945–2015), painter, photographer
- Borys Fedorenko (1946–2012), painter
- Mickola Vorokhta (born 1947), painter
- Alexander Aksinin (1949–1985), printmaker, painter
- Oleksa Shatkivsky (1908–1979) painter, printmaker

== Born 1950 to present ==
- Viktor Kryzhanovsky (1950–2016), painter
- Yevgeniy Prokopov (born 1950), sculptor
- Nikolai Bartossik (born 1951), painter, monumental artist
- Volodymyr Harbuz (born 1951), painter, graphic artist
- Nicholas Zalevsky(born 1951), painter, graphic artist
- Olena Golub (born 1951), painter, digital artist
- Les Podervyansky (born 1952), painter, playwright
- Sergei Sviatchenko (born 1952), visual artist
- Borys Buryak (born 1953), painter
- Vasiliy Ryabchenko (born 1954), painter, graphic artist, photographer, author of objects and installations
- Victoria Kovalchuk (1954–2021), graphic artist
- Alexander Kostetsky (1954–2010), painter, graphic artist
- Viktor Burduk (born 1957), sculptor
- Matvei Vaisberg (born 1958), painter, graphic artist and book designer
- Alexandr Guristyuk (born 1959), painter
- Roman Turovsky-Savchuk (born 1961), painter, composer
- Oleksandr Miroshnikov (born 1962), stone-carver, jeweler
- Ihor Podolchak (born 1962), filmmaker, visual artist
- Marina Skugareva (born 1962), painter
- Glib Vysheslavsky(born 1962), painter, new media artist
- Oleg Kharch (born 1963), painter, collage, street artist
- Temo Svirely (born 1964), painter
- Max Vityk (bort 1964), painter
- Giennadij Jerszow (born 1967), sculptor
- Vlada Ralko (born 1969), painter
- Yelena Yemchuk (born 1970), painter, photographer
- Aljoscha (born 1974), artist
- Alisa Margolis (born 1975), artist
- Boris Krylov (born 1976), sculptor
- Anna Ivanovna Petrova (born 1962), muralist
- Mykhailo Kolodko (born 1978), sculptor
- Anastasiya Markovich (born 1979), painter
- Alexander Milov (born 1979), artist and sculptor from Odesa
- Andrey Babchynsky (born 1980), painter Odesa
- Olesya Hudyma (born 1980), painter
- Anatolii Sloiko (born 1980), artist and curator
- Katerina Omelchuk (born 1982), painter
- Stepan Ryabchenko (born 1987), new media artist, sculptor, architect
- Nahirna22 artist collective
- Sestry Feldman, identical twin street artists

== See also ==
- List of Ukrainian painters
