= Miroshnykov =

Miroshnykov or Miroshnikov is a surname of Ukrainian origin. It is a patronymic surname literally meaning "son of miller (miroshnyk)". Notable people with the surname include:

- Daniil MiroshnikovBelarusian professional footballer
- Mikhail Miroshnikov (1926–2020), Russian physicist
- Oleksandr Miroshnikov, Ukrainian artist, stone-carver and jeweler

== See also ==
- 12214 Miroshnikov, a minor planet
