= Ivan Cherinko =

Ukrainian artist (1908–1948)

- Черінько Іван Іванович (Ukrainian)
- Born: Ivan Ivonovich Cherinko; August 4 (July 22 (O.S.)), 1908
- Died: October 6, 1948 (aged 40); Ashgabat, Turkmenistan
- Style: Classical Turkmen fine art
- Spouse: Yevgenia Adamova (1913–1991)

Ivan Ivanovich Cherinko (Черінько Іван Іванович (Ukrainian), 1908–1948) was a Ukrainian artist who moved to Turkmenistan, after visiting Ashgabat in 1933 and finding the city beautiful and picturesque. He was among the Russian-trained artists who came to Turkmenistan and created works of art the captured the nature and culture of the republic. He founded the Union of Artists of Turkmenistan in the 1930s and co-founded the Sh. Rustaveli Turkmen Art School. In 1945, he was named an Honored Art Worker of the Turkmen Soviet Socialist Republic (Turkmen SSR, 1925–1991).

== Early life and education ==
Cherinko was born on July 22, 1908, in the village of Den'hi, which is now the Zolotonosha Raion in the Cherkasy Oblast of Central Ukraine. From 1926 to 1931, he studied art at the Kyiv Art Institute under M. D. Bernshtein and B. F. Uits.

== Career ==
He was among a group of artists who had studied with Russian masters and graduated from Russian art schools that came to Turkmenistan in the 1930s. They established classical Turkmen fine arts, utilizing colorful folk art, utilizing their training in traditional fine arts of Russia. He premiered in an exhibition in 1934, and his works are considered significant examples of Turkmen painting. Cherinko studied the culture and the lives of the Turkmen people and sought to capture the nature of their inner worlds. His portraits, landscapes, and historical compositions reflected the charm and traditional culture of the country. He painted the portraits of order-bearer collective farmer Nurjemal Ersaryeva and National Artist Alty Karliev. His paintings, The Smithy (1928), The Bey: The Powers That Be (1940), The Daring Horseback Riders (1944–46), and Spring in Bagir (1947) reflect the social transformations that Soviet Turkmenia experienced in the first half of the 20th century. His works are among the collection of the Turkmen Museum of Fine Arts. In 1945, he became an Honored Art Worker of the Turkmen SSR.

Cherinko founded the Union of Artists of Turkmenistan in the 1930s, when fine arts gained momentum within Turkmenistan. In 1938 and from 1945 to 1948, he chaired the administrative board of the Union. He established himself among students, alumni, and teachers of the Eastern Shock-School of Arts. Cherinko and Sergei Beglyarov established an art school in Aşgabat named after Shota Rustaveli. From 1933 to 1936, and again from 1938 to 1940, he taught at the Sh. Rustaveli Turkmen Art School, where he promoted the method of socialist realism.

== Personal life ==
Cherinko married a friend and student Yevgenia Adamova (1913–1991). She was born in Livny, Oryol region of Russia and moved to Turkmenistan with her parents in 1932. Best known for Nevertheless, I will study and Turkmen mothers to Motherland, her works are also among the collection of the Turkmen Museum of Fine Arts. He died on October 6, 1948, in Ashgabat during the 1948 Ashgabat earthquake, which killed between 10,000 and 100,000 people.

== See also ==
- List of Ukrainian artists
