= Max Vityk =

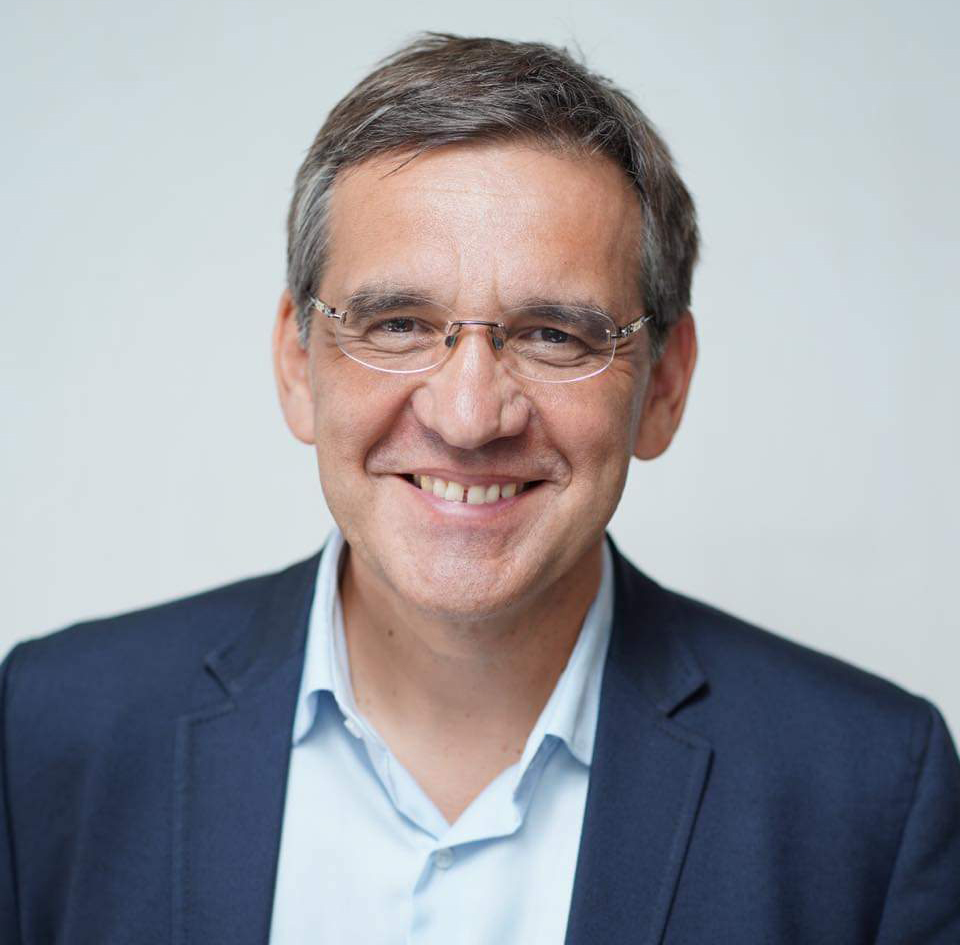
- Born: May 27, 1964 (age 62)

Max Vityk (born May 27, 1964 in Lviv, Ukraine) is a Ukrainian-American geologist, senior executive, and artist. Renowned for his expertise in geological sciences and operational leadership, Vityk has also gained recognition for his innovative art inspired by geology and mythology.

== Early life, education and geology career ==
Born in Lviv, Ukraine, in 1964, Vityk was surrounded by culture from a young age particularly since his father was an opera singer. A close family friend mineralogy professor Volodymyr Kalyuznyi introduced the youngster to geology, describing the origins of life in the strata of rock and leading Vityk to his future profession. From 1982-1989, Vityk received MS degree in geology at University of Lviv and a PhD degree in geochemistry from the Institute of Geology and Geochemistry, also in Lviv. Following graduate school, from 1989 to 1997 he conducted post-doctoral studies and faculty work first at the Department of Physics and Astronomy of Calgary University and later at the Geology Department of Virginia Polytechnic Institute in Blacksburg, Virginia. During this time Vityk publishes a series of scientific articles in leading international professional journals: Contributions to Mineralogy and Petrology; American Mineralogist; Economic Geology; Tectonophysics. From 1997 to 2005 Vityk worked as geologist at ExxonMobil (mostly in the USA), from 2005 to 2019 he worked at Shell PLC (globally) and from 2020 he is employed by Naftogaz Group in Ukraine. In 2019 Vityk also took position of adjunct professor at Virginia Polytechnic Institute.

== Geology career ==
=== ExxonMobil (1997-2005) ===
Vityk began his career with ExxonMobil in Houston, where he specialized in research and business development. He contributed to large-scale global exploration projects, employing geochemistry, seismic analysis and advanced geophysical technologies to locate and develop hydrocarbon resources. His work at ExxonMobil provided him with extensive technical experience in global energy research and operations.

=== Shell (2005-2019) ===
At Shell, Vityk progressed to leadership roles in exploration and production, managing projects in Ukraine, former Soviet Union, across Europe, North America, Brazil and the North Africa. In Egypt he led onshore exploration in Western Desert, making several big discoveries.

=== Naftogaz of Ukraine (2020-present) ===
As a senior executive at Ukrgazvydobuvannya (UGV) of Naftogaz of Ukraine, Vityk in 2020 took on position as Director of Strategic Projects, and later in 2021 as Director for Exploration and Development. He led efforts to modernize exploration and production capabilities of the company, and delivered record-breaking results in exploration and development drilling during the Russian-Ukrainian war to increase gas production four times compared to pre-war. His work demonstrated that Ukraine still offers significant opportunities for increasing gas production, provided modern technologies, approaches, and professional personnel are utilized. Moreover, the increase gas production during the war served as a symbol of national resilience and sovereignty.

== Art career ==
=== Houston (1997-2005) ===
Vityk started painting during late nineties to explore both figurative and abstract art, inspired by American expressionism and his geological knowledge. Vityk’s first art studio was settled in the garage of his house in the suburb of Houston where he lived from 1997 until 2005. Artists that were inspirational for Vityk - Paul Klee, Piet Mondrian, Yves Klein, Barnet Newman and Willem de Kooning - but it was Jackson Pollock who captured him most. Vityk traveled to New York to visit the NYC Museum of Modern Art’s Pollock collection after seeing Ed Harris’s film Pollock. Seeing the work at MOMA was vital for Vityk, who says he began to seriously paint under Pollock’s influence. One of Vityk's earliest Houston series (2001-2003) shows the strong influence of early Pollock in their crude graphic line. The works combine decorative folk pattern and the bright color of Ukrainian traditional craft.

Vityk admits to a life-long interest in art. As a self-taught painter, he experiments freely, moving back and forth between figurative work, which he began with, and later abstraction. Even in the earliest works, small format oil paintings of landscapes and flowers, he worked in heavily texture layers: betraying the geologist’s vision in the complexity and layers of surface patterns. Vityk received no formal artistic training, but during his international geological assignments, he showed interest in the culture of the nation where he lived and worked, visiting art galleries and museums and interacting with local artists.

=== Ukraine (2005-2012) ===
In 2005 Max Vityk moved back to Ukraine where he lived and worked until 2012. In Ukraine he purchased a lake house with art studio in Zasupoyivka village located 100 km east from capital Kyiv, where several important Ukrainian artists have studios. Since declaring independence in 1991, Ukraine has struggled to develop an identity independent of Russia and the Soviet Union. Artists, writers, musicians and others found the ancient symbols of Ukrainian folk art powerful as metaphors for reclaiming their history. Folklore, embroidery, native song and dance, and regional arts have grown immensely in popularity

In 2007 he had his first solo show entitled “Geology of Painting” at the Da Vinchy gallery in Kyiv. The earlier Vityk’s works show a strong folk Ukrainian influence, most clearly in the small series done in 2011 titled Hutsul, which was painted in Zasupoyivka. Vityk references the Hutsul decorative patterns of embroidery produced in the Carpathian Mountains which are traditionally geometric and brightly colored.

Influences of urban architecture, graffiti art, and heavy surface textures reminiscent of cave paintings can be seen in Vityk's Sin City (2006-2011), Transformers (2010) and Hallucination in Zasupoyivka (2009-2020) series. The works explore themes that deal with the relationship between traditional Ukrainian crafts and legends and the modern world. The figurative works often feature rough, cracked surfaces and a sense of three-dimensional, becoming increasingly abstract over time. In 2009, the “Triptych” Kyiv gallery exhibited works from the minimalist “Silver & Black” series, painted in Zasupoyivka. The series was used by Vityk to explore color and texture.

The “Hallucinations in Zasupoyivka” series - one of the most important Vityk’s body of works, emerged at the beginning of the 2010s from the artist’s enchantment with a mystical beauty of central Ukraine, which also made an impression and influenced the paintings of Ukrainian artist important to Vityk – Anatoliy Kryvolap. Selected paintings from the “Hallucination” series were first exhibited at Art Kyiv in 2011, and later followed by solo shows at the Harry F. Sinclair House of the Ukrainian Art Institute in New York (2014), ArtsMart Gallery in Cairo (2016), National Museum Kyiv Art Gallery and Museum of Ukrainian Diaspora in Kyiv (2023).

=== The Netherlands (2012-2015) ===
In 2012 Vityk moved to the Netherlands where he lived and worked until 2015. His studio was settled in the village of Wassenaar on the North Sea coast a few kilometers from The Hague near the horse racing venue known as Duindigt. Paintings from the “Duindigt” series were strongly influenced by Western and Eastern mysticism.

Although Vityk is an American citizen and a global figure, his upbringing in Ukraine plays an important role in his interest in, and interpretation of abstraction. As a geologist, working in the industry around the world, he does not think in national terms, logical for such scientists, who see the world in time periods and rock layers that have no relation to geographic or political boundaries. That does not mean that Vityk’s work never addresses social and political issues in his art. His large scale figurative “Warriors of Light” paintings that he started in the Netherlands in 2014 refers directly to the revolutionary events in Ukraine and in the Arab world. Selected painting of Warriors of Light were first displayed at Scope Art Show in Basel (2014) and Cairo Biennale (2015). First exhibition of the entire series took place at the ArtMarts Gallery in Cairo (2016), followed by solo shows at the Harry F. Sinclair House at the Ukrainian Art Institute in New York (2017) and several museum solo exhibits, including The International Museum Art & Since in MacAllen, Texas (2020), Kyiv National Art Gallery (2023), Poltava Art Museum (2023) and University of Lviv (2023). Nancy Moyer, Professor Emerita of Art, UTRGV writes about Vityk’s exhibition at McAllen museum: “Walking into Max Vityk exhibition, the gallery becomes a cave of paintings, a majestic inner earth that dwarfs us through its visual power and fills our senses with its importance. There is definitely a spiritual element at work here.”

In the Netherlands Vityk started another set of large canvases entitled “The FL” series. These large flower paintings were inspired by the surreal emotions of the iconic bon fires that guarded Revolutionary Euromaidan in Kyiv. In the Netherlands Vityk also created a small series of paintings from 2014-2015, Fragments. Appearing like primitive archeologic finds, these are painted on cardboard, a material that warps and disintegrates in a cycle reminiscent of geologic processes.

In the Netherlands Vityk started in depth exploring geology based abstract painting. In the “Lava” series (2013-2014), Vityk plunges fully into abstraction as a way to discuss the violent interaction of volcanic forces. Most of the series is formatted vertically with color dripping down like stalactites. In this series he is developing new “outcropping” technique by mixing enamel and sealing foam to make the work highly three dimensional, strikingly effective in expressing movement which paradoxically took place over millions of years. Vityk then adds a color scheme correlating with geologic events, white in particular evoking cycles of ice ages.

In another science-inspired Energy series (2013) Vityk explores solar, wind and renewable bio-energy as well as the oil and gas of his professional study of sedimentary rocks. The Energy series is inspired by the five elements of energy. The strong colors of his monochromes visualize space, transformation, water and air, sun and growth, the basis for our whole universe, from animate to inanimate, from particle to atom. The project Energy has been designed for Shell PLC and was on permanent display at Shell headquarters in The Hague from 2013 until 2020, and from 2021 until present is on display in the headquoters of Naftogas of Ukraine in Kyiv.

=== Cairo (2015 - 2018) ===
In 2015 Vityk moved to Cairo, Egypt where he lived and worked until 2018. Geology based abstract paintings The Outcrops - is probably the most important art series painted by Vityk in Egypt.

Vityk’s geology based art experiments with mixing media have, from the beginning, shared the textural roughness and complexity of artists such as the Italian Alberto Burri and the Japanese Kazuo Shirago. Vityk’s colored stratigraphic canvases, reflecting his deep interest in theories of form and color, show some distance correlation with stripe paintings by the Swiss-German Paul Klee, American Gene Davis and Ukrainian Anatoly Kryvolap. The figurative work of Willem de Kooning, with its gestural brush work and suggestion of violent movement strongly correlates with Vityk’s highly textured surfaces. He is not alone as a geologist-artist (the Danish modernist Per Kirkeby comes to mind), but as a scientist/artist in the 21st century, Vityk represents a distinctly new avant-garde generation of science-based abstract expressionists.

Painting from The Outcrops series were inspired by those areas of the earth’s bedrock exposed through erosion and manmade road cuts. In The Outcrops, Vityk charts the entire geologic timescale of the Earth using his “outcropping” technique of foam and enamel paint. This combination of different materials creates textures reminiscent of living rock formations. As one of the new generation of abstractionists, Vityk brings a thematic focus to the scale and layered paint of the New York School painters. His color system creates a symbolic layering of geologic time, from the white of ice ages to the blues and greens of life emerging from the seas and moving on to land.

Selected painting from The Outcrops were first exhibited Art Context in New York (2017), followed by solo shows at the Harry F. Sinclair House at the Ukrainian Art Institute in New York (2017), and international Museum of Art & Science Museum in McAllen, Texas (2018). In 2023 Vityk started a road show with this series at Ukrainian universities. First university solo entitled “History of Planet Earth” took place at the art gallery of Poltava University in Poltava, shortly followed by a solo entitled “Earth Spirit” at the Sheptyckyi Art Center of the Ukrainian Catholic University in Lviv (2023). Later Vityk further developed geology-based theme in his abstract series “Ore”, “Magma” and “Bedrocks”.

In Cairo Vityk also continued working on ”The Warriors of Light” series. Of the twelve 200x300 cm paintings, the first six canvases were painted in his studio in the Netherlands and the last six were painted in Cairo. As a result, there are subtle differences between the first and last six works, the most pronounced in 'Desert Guardian', 2016, which reveals the Arab aesthetics Vityk experienced in Egypt.

=== Arizona (2018-2020) ===
In 2018 Vityk moved to Arizona where he lived and worked until 2020. His studio was settled in Sedona - small town in the mountains 190 km north from Phoenix.

In Sedona Vityk brings his geology based painting to a new level to create a stylish monochromes series entitled Red Rocks. These works were created by integrating the “outcropping” technique that he used in previous geology based paintings with natural ochre and iron oxide pigments to reflect the colors of the surrounding rock formations.

=== Ukraine (2020-present) ===
In 2020 Max Vityk moved from Arizona to Kyiv, Ukraine where he is currently works and lives. In 2022 with a start of Russian invasion of Ukraine Vityk was immediately immersed into the tragedy of war and his art becomes a part of Ukrainian cultural resistance. Starting 2022 he is participating in numerous solo and group exhibitions around the country. His first war time solo show The Warriors of Light was opened in Kyiv on October 2, 2022 at the National Museum Kyiv Art Gallery. A week later, on October 10 Russian army launched a massive missile attack on the main cultural institutions of Ukraine. The building of the National Museum Kyiv Art Gallery and Vityk’s exhibition were damaged. The exhibition was reopened in April 2023 after museum reconstruction.

Starting 2023 Vityk’s exhibitions are traveling around the country with 7 solo and 4 group shows at Ukrainian museums, galleries and universities. In September 2023 University of Lviv opens a major show of Vityk works along with large charity event to support the Ukrainian army. At the exhibition opening Maksym Kozytskyi, head of Lviv Regional State/Military Administration said: "Every individual who is now protecting our territorial integrity and the entire generations who have done this long before us - are also the Warriors of Light. We must remember who made it possible for us to live and attend such events. It is our duty to honor everyone we have lost and to support those who are now at the front lines”.

== Selected solo exhibitions ==
- Mirage and Reality, Museum of Ukrainian Diaspora, Kyiv, Ukraine. 2023-2024
- Max Vityk: Warriors of Light, Lviv National University. 2023-2024
- Max Vityk: Spirt of the Earth, Sheptyckyi Art Center of Ukrainian Catholic University, Lviv, Ukraine. 2023
- The Warriors of Light, Poltava Art Museum, Poltava, Ukraine. 2023
- The Warriors of Light at Pidhirtsi Castle, Museum of Pidhoreckyi Castle, Ukraine. 2023
- History of Planet Earth, Poltava Polytechnic University, Poltava, Ukraine. 2023
- Hallucinations in Cairo, Triptich Art Gallery, Kyiv, Ukraine, 2023
- The Warriors of Light, National Museum Kyiv Art Gallery, Ukraine. 2022-2023
- Warriors of Light, International Museum of Art and Science, McAllen, USA. 2021
- Max Vityk: Paintings, Ukrainian Institute of America, New York, USA. 2021
- The Outcrops, International Museum of Art and Science, McAllen, USA. 2018
- Max Vityk: Warriors Of Light/The Outcrops, Ukrainian Institute of America, New York, USA. 2017
- Max Vityk: Retrospective, ArtsMart Gallery, Cairo, Egypt. 2016
- A Journey, Ukrainian Institute of America, New York, USA. 2014
- Energy Project, Shell Headquarters, The Hague, The Netherlands. 2013
- Max Vityk: The Retrospective, Contemporary Art Center M17, Kyiv, Ukraine. 2012
- Max Vityk: Retrospective, Lviv Municipal Art Center, Lviv, Ukraine. 2010
- Silver and Black, Triptich Gallery, Kyiv, Ukraine. 2009
- Max Vityk: Paintings, Bottega Gallery, Kyiv, Ukraine. 2008
- Geology of Painting, Da Vinci Gallery, Kyiv, Ukraine. 2007

== Illustrations ==
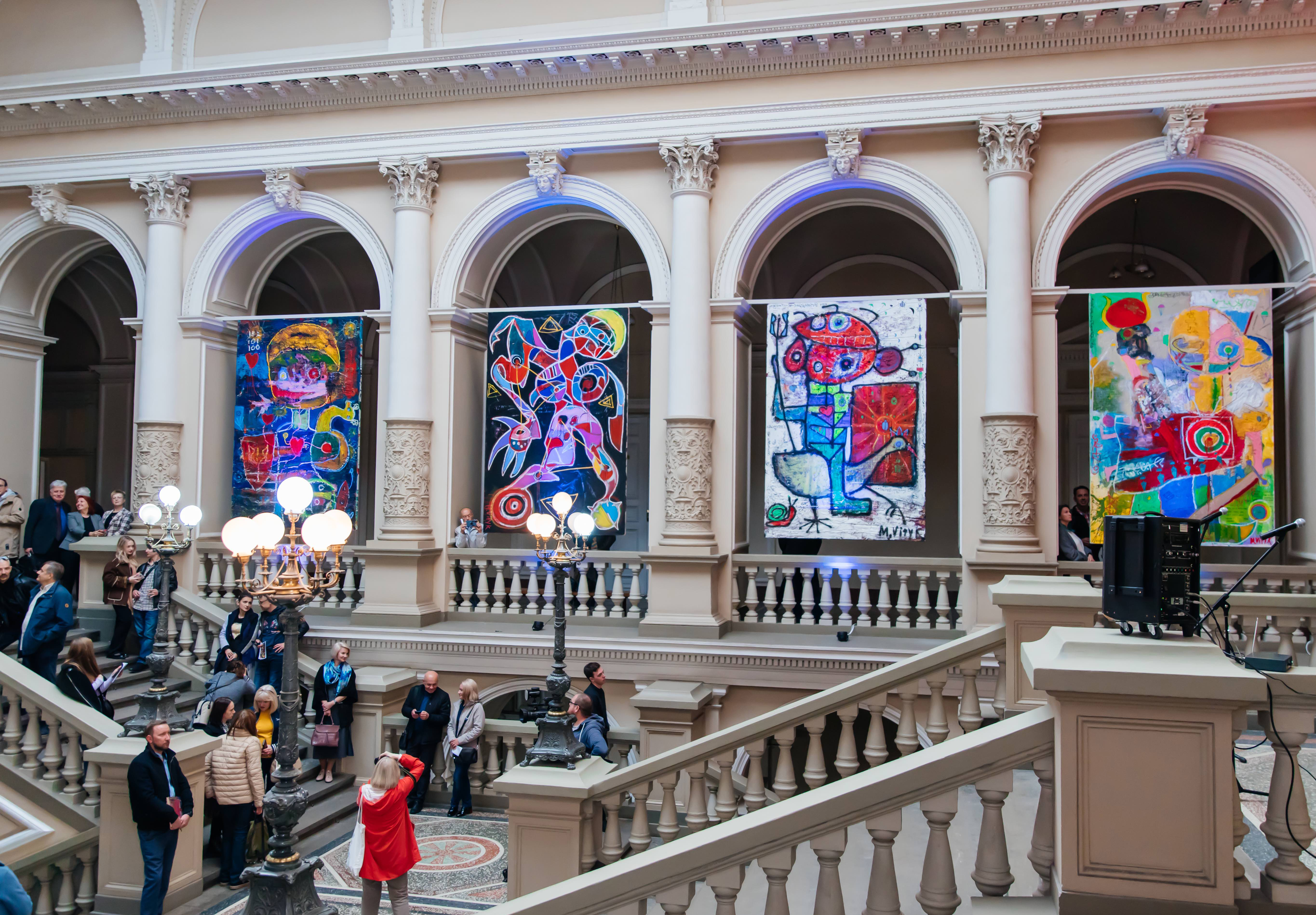
Max Vityk Warriors of Light paintings exhibited in the main Hall of Lviv National University. 2023-2024

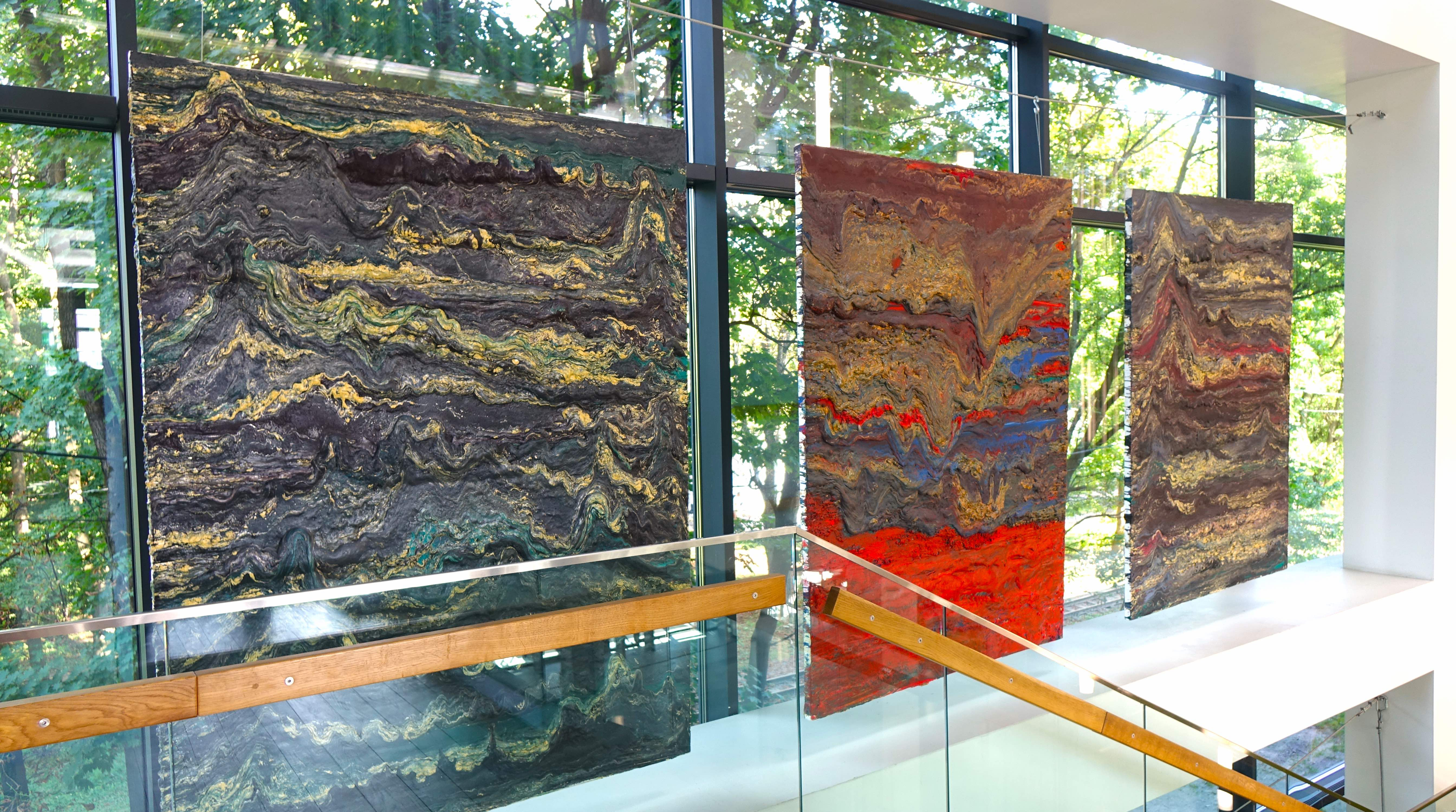
Max Vityk exhibition “Spirt of the Earth” at Sheptyckyi Art Center of Ukrainian Catholic University, Lviv, Ukraine. 2023

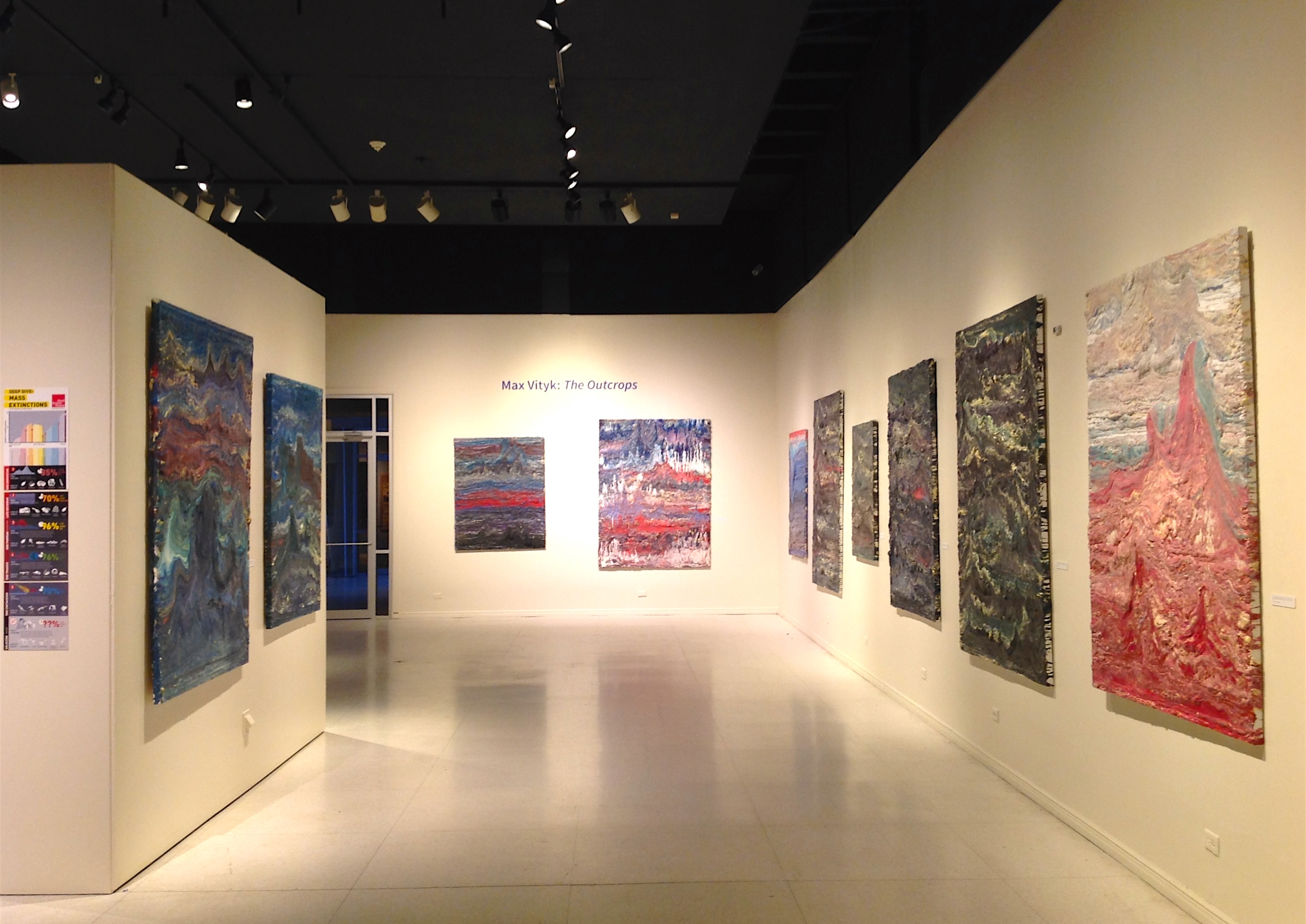
Max Vityk exhibition “The Outcrops” at International Museum of Art and Science, McAllen, USA. 2018

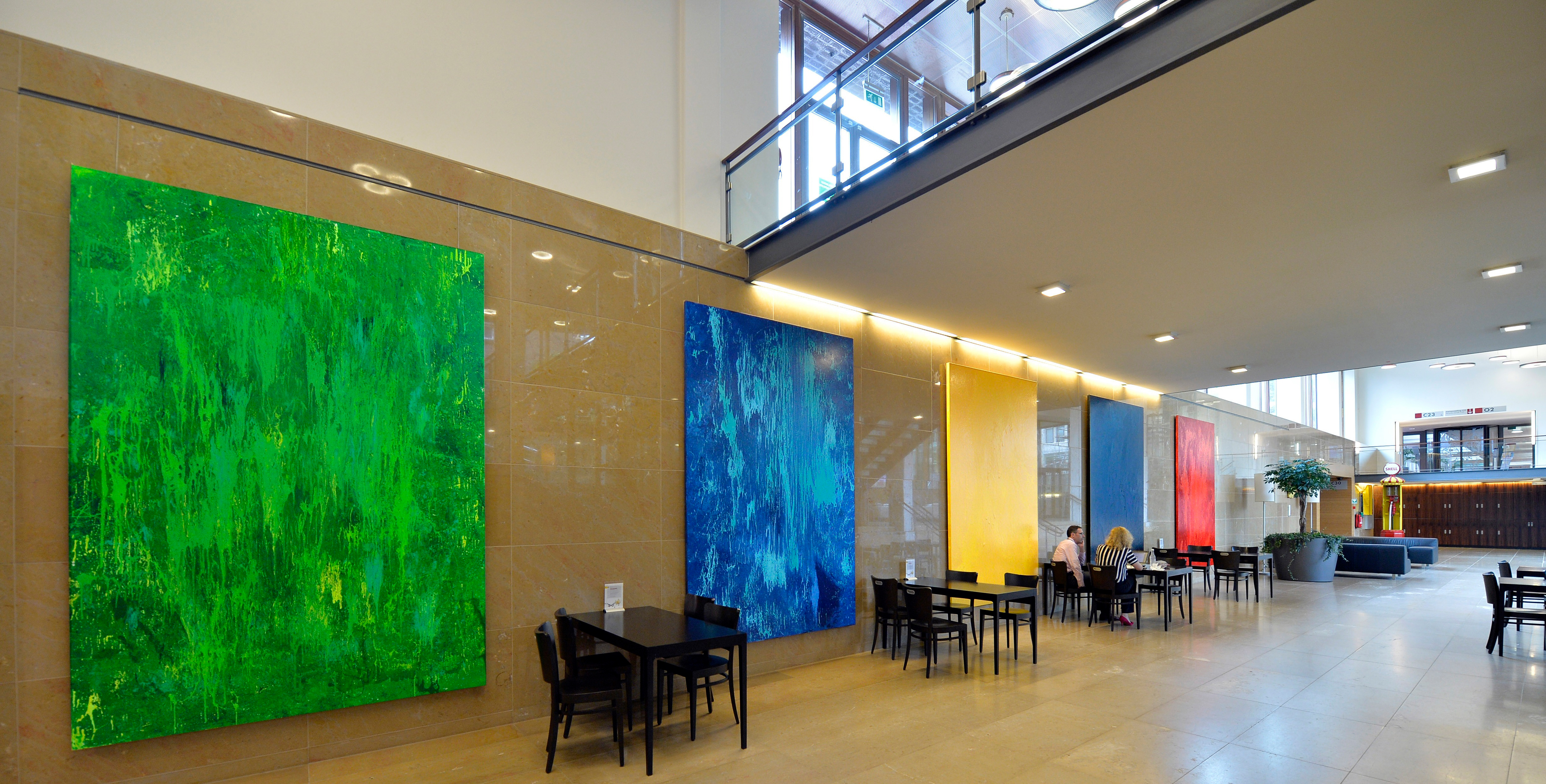
Max Vityk Energy Project at Shell Headquarters, The Hague, The Netherlands. 2013

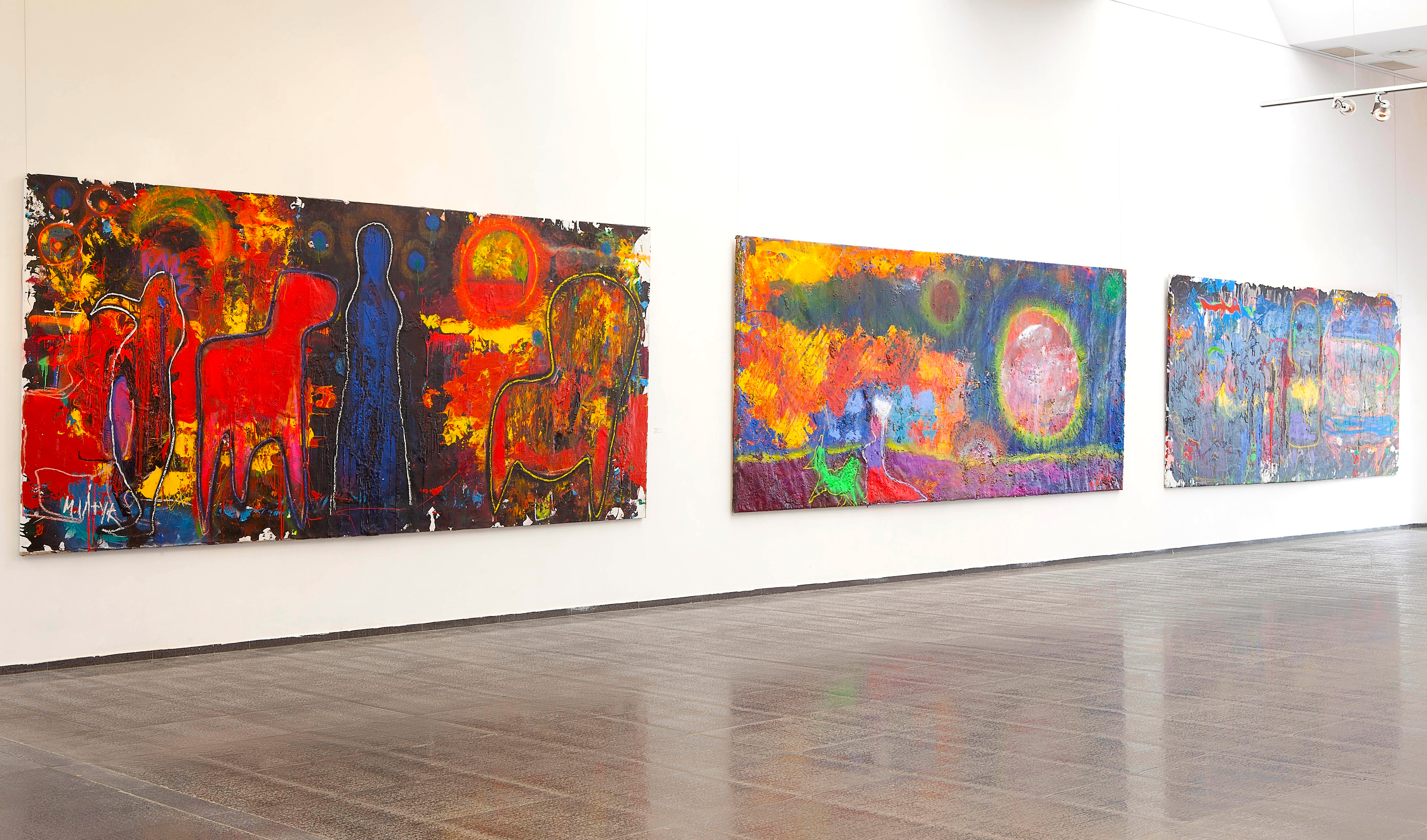
Max Vityk exhibition “The Retrospective” at Contemporary Art Center M17, Kyiv, Ukraine. 2012
