= Mikhail Bernshtein =

Russian painter

Mikhail Davidovich Bernshtein
- Born: 28 January 1875; Rostov-on-Don, Russian Empire
- Died: 9 May 1960 (aged 85); Leningrad, USSR
- Education: Imperial Academy of Arts
- Known for: Painting, Teaching
- Movement: Realism

Mikhail Davidovich Bernshtein (Russian: Михаил Давидович Бернштейн) (28 January 1875, Rostov-on-Don – 9 May 1960, Leningrad) was a Soviet painter and art educator, who lived and worked in Leningrad, a member of the Leningrad Union of Soviet Artists, professor of the Repin Institute of Arts, who played an important role in the formation of the Leningrad School of Painting.

== Biography ==
Mikhail Bernshtein was born on 28 January 1875 in Rostov-on-Don. He studied painting and drawing in London (1894–1899), Munich, Paris (1899–1901), visited Italy. In 1901-1903 Bernshtein studied at the Imperial Academy of Arts, where he was a student of Ilya Repin.

Since 1902 Mikhail Bernshtein begins to participate in art exhibitions. In 1907-1916 he taught in Saint Petersburg, where he hold private art school. He was married to artist Catherine Turova. In 1916-1924 he taught at art school in Zhitomir, in 1924–1932 at the Kyiv Art Institute. In 1932-1948 Bernshtein taught drawing in the Repin Institute of Arts in Leningrad. He wrote several articles and tutorials on drawing, as well as the book «Problems of teaching drawing». In 1948-1950 he taught also in Vera Mukhina Institute of Industrial Art.

In 1930-1940 Mikhail Bernshtein made a great contribution to the system of Soviet Art education and artistic training of highly qualified young artists. During the Great Patriotic War his son Sandro went to the front as soldier and was missing.

== Pupils ==
- Evgenia Baykova
- Piotr Belousov
- Ivan Cherinko
- Alexander Debler
- Vera Ermolaeva
- Mikhail Kozell
- Vladimir Lebedev
- Sarra Lebedeva
- Felix Lembersky
- Nikolai Mukho
- Mikhail Natarevich
- Lev Orekhov
- Sergei Osipov
- Maria Rudnitskaya
- Gleb Savinov
- Nadezhda Shteinmiller
- Elena Skuin
- Alexander Sokolov
- Vladimir Tatlin
- Nikolai Timkov
- Yuri Tulin
- Piotr Vasiliev
- Anatoli Vasiliev
- Vecheslav Zagonek
- and others

== See also ==
- Leningrad School of Painting
- List of 20th-century Russian painters
- List of painters of Saint Petersburg Union of Artists
- Saint Petersburg Union of Artists

== Sources ==
- Бернштейн М. Проблемы учебного рисунка. Л., 1940.
- Художники народов СССР. Биобиблиографический словарь. Т. 1. М., Искусство, 1970. С.383.
- Александр Иванович Савинов. Письма. Документы. Воспоминания. Л., Художник РСФСР, 1983. C.45, 47, 49, 50, 67, 87, 151, 154, 287.
