= Miroshnyk =

Miroshnyk or Miroshnik is a Ukrainian language occupational surname literally meaning "miller". Notable people with the surname include:

- Hryhorii Miroshnyk, Ukrainian footballer
- Meg Miroshnik, American playwright
- Rodion Miroshnyk (born 1974), Ukrainian politician, now Luhansk separatist
- Roman Miroshnyk, Ukrainian footballer
- Viktor Miroshnik (1937–2016), head of Kazakh SSR KGB
