= Nahirna22 =

Ukrainian artist ccollective

Nahirna 22 is an association of Ukrainian artists operating within the premises of the Kyiv Institute of Automation in Kyiv, Ukraine. The group is composed of young contemporary artists working across painting, installation, sculpture, photography, textile arts, and experimental media. Nahirna22 regularly organizes open-studio days, exhibitions, collaborative workshops, and cultural events.

Nahirna22 gained international attention after its studios were damaged twice by Russian drone strikes in 2025, prompting media coverage and solidarity from the global arts community. The community's artists rebuilt following both attacks.

== History ==
The collective formed organically within the former premises of the Kyiv Institute of Automation (KIA), where unused industrial rooms and technical workshops became ad-hoc studios for young artists. Over time, the space evolved into a cohesive artistic community known as Nahirna22, after its address.

By 2019, the group had institutionalized its public presence with the first annual Open Workshop Day, an event in which residents opened their studios to visitors, curators, students, and collectors. The initiative grew into a recurring cultural tradition and helped establish the collective as a recognized center of independent art in Kyiv.

=== Damage during the Russian invasion of Ukraine ===
During the ongoing Russian invasion of Ukraine, the Nahirna22 studios suffered significant damage in two separate drone strikes.

A Russian drone hit the building in August 2025, shattering windows, damaging artworks and equipment, and temporarily displacing artists. The incident was covered in Ukrainian and international art media, which highlighted the vulnerability of independent cultural spaces during the war and artist's resilience. Nahirna22 immediately reopened to the public following the attack and hosted its Open Workshop Day.

In November 2025, the studios were hit again during a wave of drone attacks on Kyiv. The Art Newspaper and other outlets reported that artworks were destroyed, studios flooded with debris, and artists injured. The second attack prompted public fundraising and increased media attention to the risks facing Ukrainian cultural infrastructure.
