= Poltava Art Museum =

Coordinates: 49.5896°N 34.5554°E

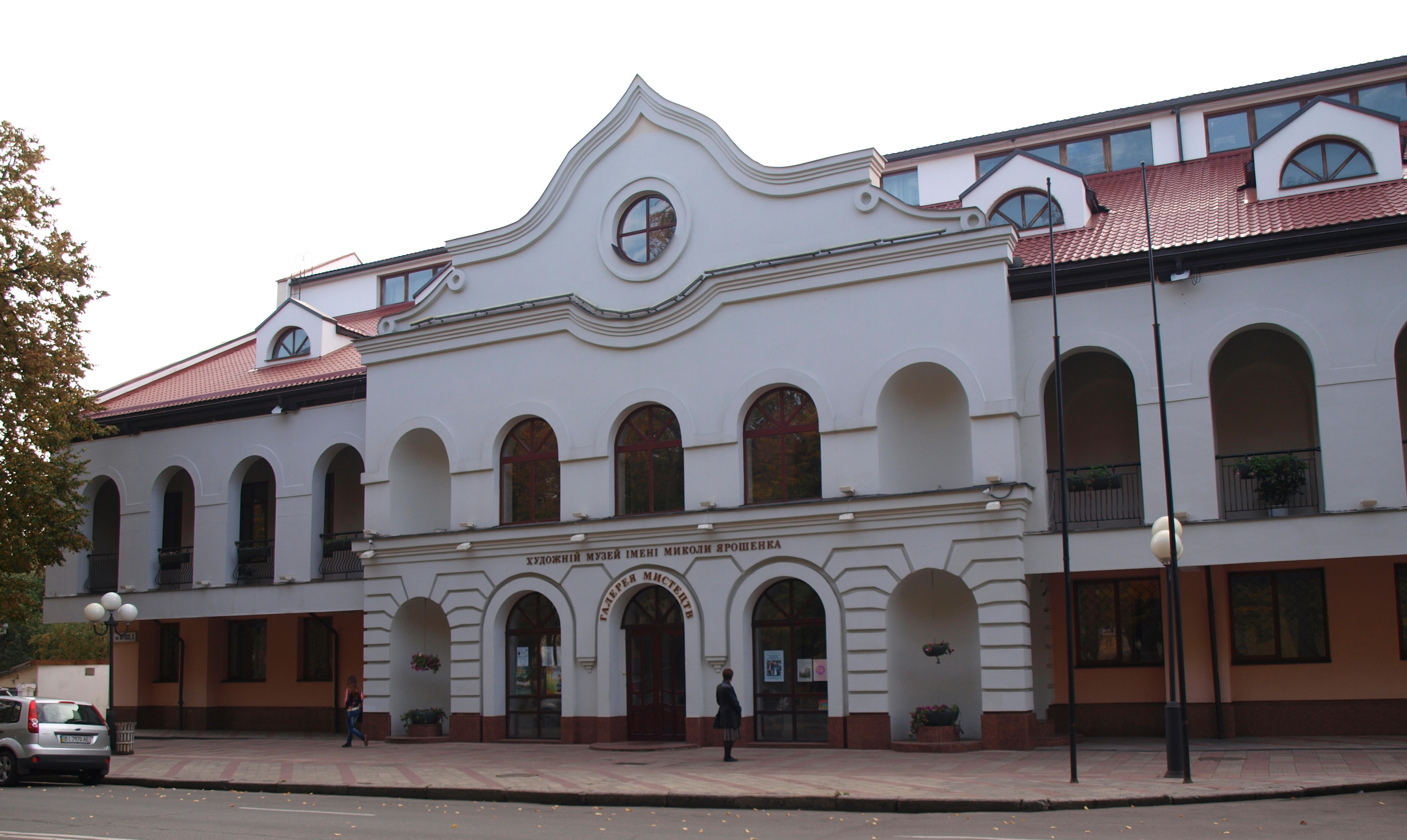
Poltava Art Gallery (Nikolai Yaroshenko Art Museum), Yevopeiska Street, Poltava

The Poltava Art Museum (Ukrainian: Полтавський художній музей) is a public art gallery in Poltava, Ukraine which contains many works of native and foreign art and a rich ethnographic collection.

== History ==
Today’s collection of the museum was started in 1917, when Nikolai Yaroshenko, a painter who belonged to the Association of Itinerants (‘Peredvizhniki’), donated his art collection to his native city. As well as 100 paintings and 23 sketchbooks created by Yaroshenko himself, his collection included works by his friends and colleagues who took part in the Itinerant Art Exhibitions: Ivan Shishkin, Vasily Polenov, Vladimir Makovsky, Ilya Repin, Vasily Maksimov and others.

The Museum was opened to the public on April 27, 1919. Originally it was officially an art gallery, not a real museum. Its founder Mikhail Rudynsky, who later became a famous Ukrainian archaeologist and museologist, called it “The Museum of Arts”.

It was decided to establish a city museum after Poltava region’s Historic and Artistic Monuments Protection Committee was created in the city. The artistic objects from the nationalised estates of the Kochubeys (in Dykanka), the Galagans (in Sokyrnytsi), the Kapnists (in Obukhivka), the Repnins (in Yahotyn) were now in public ownership. The museum was located in the mansion which had belonged to the landowner Bolyubash. It had been built in 1912 (the design was by the famous architect Aleshin) in a quiet corner of Poltava at 11, Spasskaya street.

In a year and a half, the museum became an art department of the present Local History Museum. From 1934, after liquidation of the museum had been proposed, it was relocated in the building of the Local History Museum, where it occupied nine rooms on the ground floor. On March 7, 1939, the Council of People's Commissars decreed its independent status as a regional art museum.

Shortly before the war, the collection numbered about 30,000 museum pieces. During the Nazi occupation, nearly all the objects that had been on display were ruined and lost. Only the evacuated treasures of the museum survived. The museum records were lost too. Nowadays, it is only due to the museum guide by Rudynsky that we can imagine how great the losses were: a rich collection of Western European paintings by Giovanni Battista Tiepolo, Peter Paul Rubens, Melchior d'Hondecoeter, Adriaen van Ostade, Élisabeth Louise Vigée-Le Brun and others, works by Ukrainian painters of the 17th-18th centuries, the best pieces by Russian artists of the 19th-20th centuries, to name but a few. In November 1944, when Poltava was still all ruined, the Art Museum resumed its work.

In 1951, the museum returned to its original building that had been restored. After the war, the staff of the museum did their best to make up the lost collection. Now, including the 4,187 objects that survived in the war, it numbered over 9,000 museum pieces. However, the building, somewhat hastily repaired, was in bad technical condition (as it was stated in 2000). The City Council resolved to move the museum to the building of the Art Gallery in Frunze Street. There, the exhibition takes up two separate suites of rooms on the ground floor.

== Modern period ==
After the relocation, the chronological arrangement of the exhibition remained unchanged. The suite on the left houses Western European art: paintings, sculptures, porcelain. Unique are the works by Lucas Cranach the Younger, Van Ravesteyn, Clara Peeters, Melchior d’Hondecoeter, Marcello Bacciarelli, Jean-Baptiste Greuze, Francesco Guardi and others. On the right, there are works by Ukrainian and Russian artists, samples of church utensils of the 17th-18th centuries, sculptures, furniture.

Two rooms are allocated for Yaroshenko’s works. Of special interest is his self-portrait twinned with that of his wife. Also of note are his Caucasian landscapes, portraits of his contemporaries, studies for his famous pictures.

Nowadays, the museum has taken full advantage of the new location, in particular of the large exhibition room. Large-scale art exhibitions of the works stored in the museum are periodically held, thus making it possible for the citizens to better learn the treasures their museum possesses and for the museum to promote its collection and art in general.
