= Viktor Burduk =

Russian sculptor

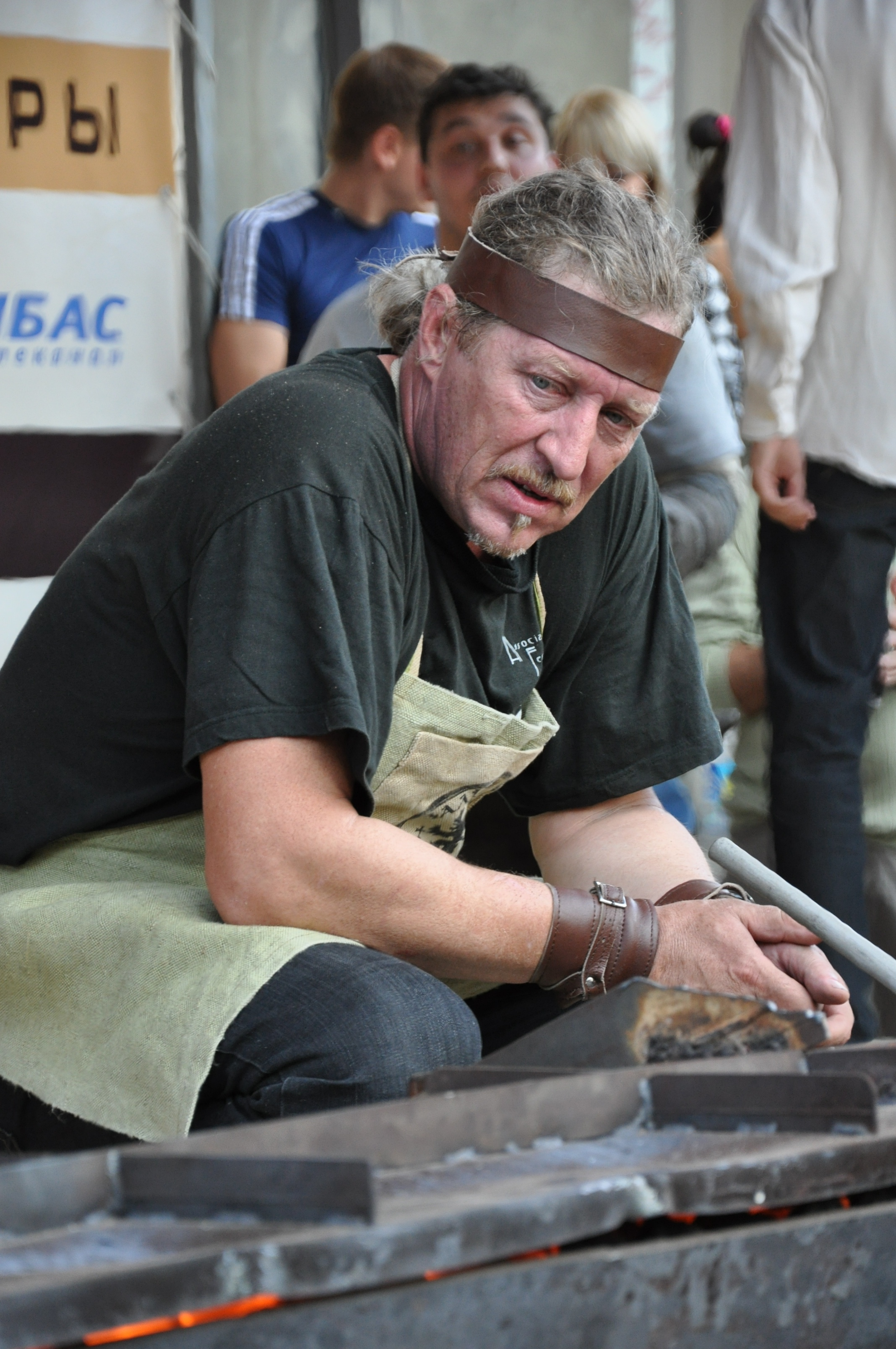
- Burduk at the 12th Forged Figures Park festival
- Born: November 10, 1957 (age 68); Baltiysk, Kaliningrad Oblast, USSR
- Known for: Sculpture

Viktor Ivanovich Burduk (born November 10, 1957, in Baltiysk, Kaliningrad Oblast, USSR) is a Russian artist. Honoured Artist of Ukraine, director of the Ukrainian Handcrafted Wrought Iron and Forge Company “Hefest”, the head of Ukraine Blacksmiths Art Masters department in Donetsk since 2009, the head of Donbas Blacksmiths Guild, Donetsk representative at the Ring Of The European Cities Of Iron Works and the head of Donbas Darts Association. He is a project author of the Forged Figures Park and hotel “Ispanskiy dvorik” and the participant of Millennium World Exhibition in Hannover in 2000.

== International Blacksmith Arts Festival and the Forged Figures Park ==
Forged Figures Park project is taking a special part in the art life of Victor Burduk. It's not only a unique park but also a place for sightseeing in Donetsk. Forged Figures Park is the name and the venue of one of the biggest international blacksmith arts festivals in Ukraine. First festivals, called "Rose of Donetsk" were a part of Donetsk City Day celebrations. Then in 2001 under the aegis of the Donetsk City Council, Victor Burduk founded the Forged Figures Park in the public garden of the City Council building. As Donetsk is called "the city of a million roses" the first sculpture of the Forged Figures Park was the flower too. Festivals are annual and held in September.
Actually during more than ten years there was created an open-air museum of blacksmith arts. Over one hundred works of various styles and sizes crafted by blacksmith masters from all over the world are presented there.

In 2016 he and other blacksmiths from the unrecognised Donetsk People's Republic installed a sword made from brass cases of fired ammunition.

== “Ispanskiy dvorik” ==
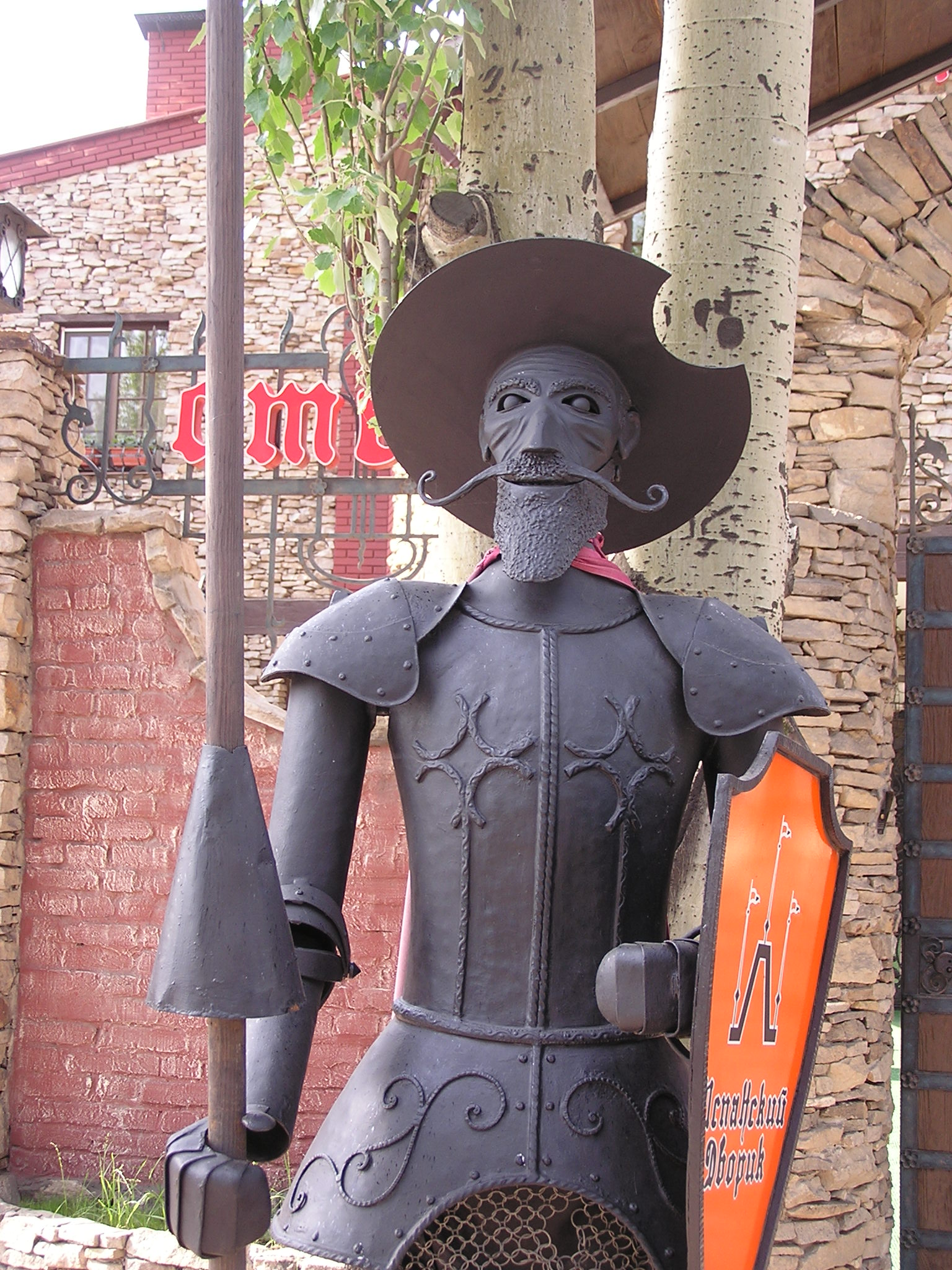
Don Quixote's wrought sculpture on the entrance to "Ispanskiy dvorik" hotel

Another important project of Viktor Burduk is a boutique hotel in Donetsk called “Ispanskiy dvorik” (en. Spanish patio) with 12 key rooms and a restaurant. Hotel interior and furniture design are full of blacksmith art and technologies. There is a lot of handicraft and unique design and it took him only two years to build and open this hotel

== Darts ==
In 1998 Darts Federation in Donetsk region asked Viktor Burduk to make a challenge cup for Journalist league. The cup is a tankard stylized like a three darts which hit a target. Winner teams etched their names on darts fletching. The team of Forge Company “Hefest” took part in competition and became a winner five times. As there were a lot of women teams in the competition Viktor Burduk decided to start a woman cup called “Wrought Rose”. “Wrought Rose” looks like a rose stalk that goes into a dart hit the target.
In 2003 a new cup for the professional players called “Wrought Dart” was founded. It is stylized like a one-meter dart standing on a target. This target is also a place for the name of the winner.
In 2004 darts tournament became an international one. In 2008 the tournament took place in a salt mine in Soledar at a depth of 300 meters.
In 2010 under the Donbass Darts Association request Viktor Burduk a new cup was created. New cup is a small copy of the Earth with schematic map of Ukraine and the dart stocked into the Donbass region. Parallels and meridians are made in the style of desk for the darts game. Viktor Burduk took part in that tournament and won it twice in 2009 and 2010.
