= Nikolai Bartossik =

Ukrainian-American painter (born 1951)

- Микола Григорович Бартосік
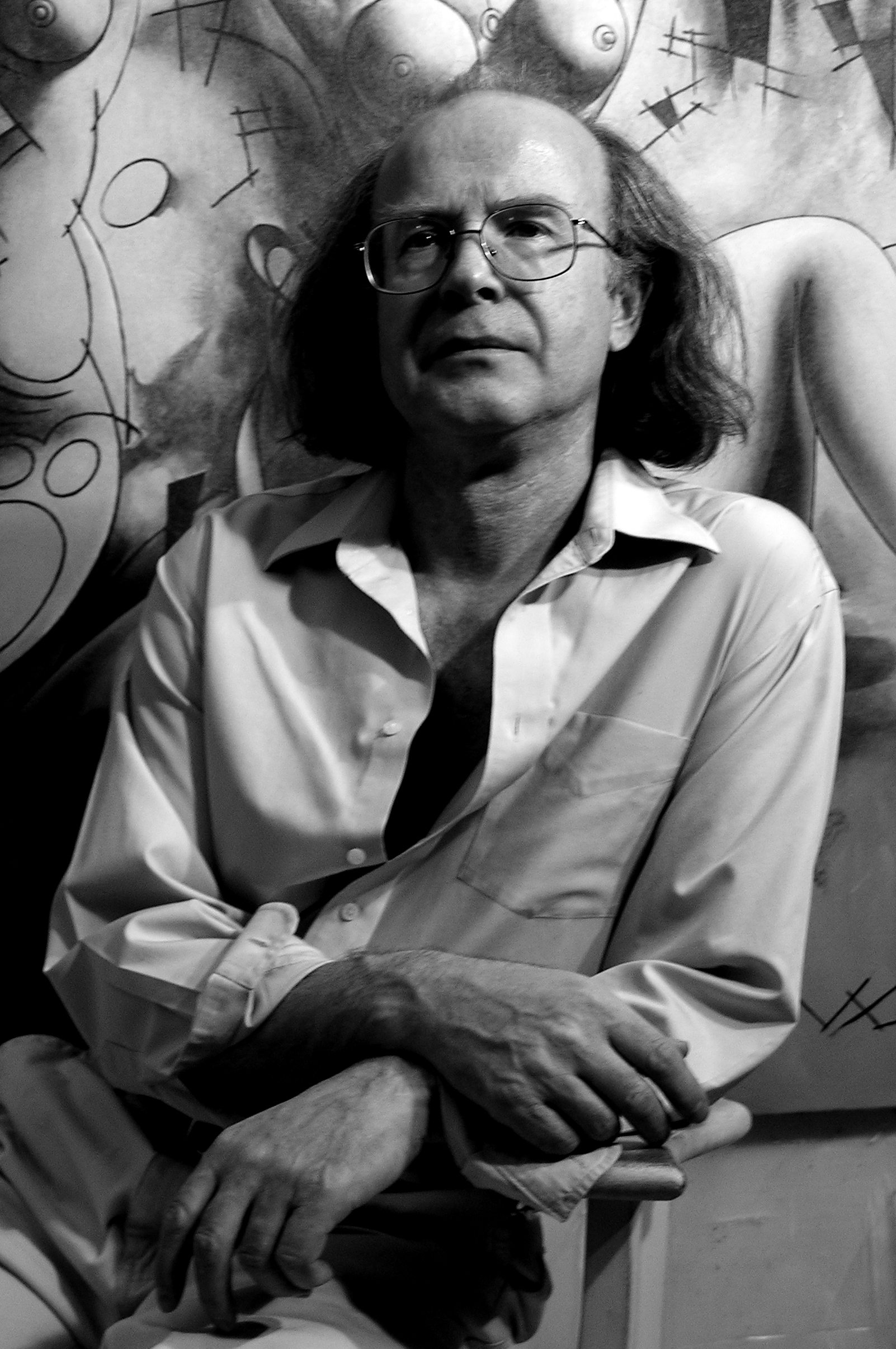
- Born: April 5, 1951 (age 75); Polkivnyche (Ivanky), Mankivka Raion, Cherkasy Oblast, Ukrainian SSR
- Died: 2 March 2023; New York
- Education: Kyiv State Institute of Decorative and Applied Art and Design, Kharkiv State Academy of Design and Arts
- Known for: Painting
- Website: http://www.bartossik.art

Nikolai Bartossik (Ukrainian: Микола Григорович Бартосік) (born April 5, 1951) – 2 March 2023, New York) – was a Ukrainian-American contemporary painter and monumental artist.

== Personal background ==
Nikolai Bartossik was born on April 5, 1951, in the Polkivnyche (Ivanky) Mankivka Raion (currently Uman Raion) in Cherkasy Oblast, Ukraine.

He graduated in 1970, from the Kyiv State Institute of Decorative and Applied Art and Design. In 1975, he graduated from the Kharkiv State Academy of Design and Arts. He immigrated to New York in 1995.

== Professional background ==
Bartossik has been a member of the National Union of Artists of Ukraine since 1993, and a member of the United Scenic Artists of America since 1998. He worked at the Kiev Monumental and Decorative Art Association from 1976 to 1995, where he worked in collaboration with artist Ernest Kotkov, creating three-dimensional compositions, including:

- "Awakening" and "Let The Sun Always Shine" – sculptures made of iron and concrete covered with mosaics (1981, Varash, former Kuznetsovsk, Rivne region, Ukraine) Project architect – F. Y. Khudyakov.
- "Meteorite" – sculpture up to 15 m of iron and concrete covered with a mosaic of glazes, marble and specially made "module" of stainless steel (1983, Dnipropetrovsk, Ukraine), architects of the project: Yuriy Khudyakov, Victor Sudorgin.
- "Lybidska" Metro Station – composition of light line with brass elements extending the full length of the station and ends with the central panel in the end station made of brass, marble, brass stars and lights. Also, lighting design by official platform and the door track on the wall made of brass. The station was opened on December 30, 1984, Kyiv, Ukraine. Architects: Valentyn Ezhov, Anatoliy Krushynkyi, Tamara Tselikovska with Oleksiy Panchenko, artists Ernest Kotkov, Nikolai Bartossik.
- "By The Sources" – sculpture mede of copper and concrete (1986, Kyiv, block – Vyhurivschyna–Troyeshchyna, Ukraine) architects of the project: Mykola Kyslyi, Grygoriy Gurenkov.

(Decorative Soviet era decoration pictured below is due to be removed due to 2015 decommunization laws.)

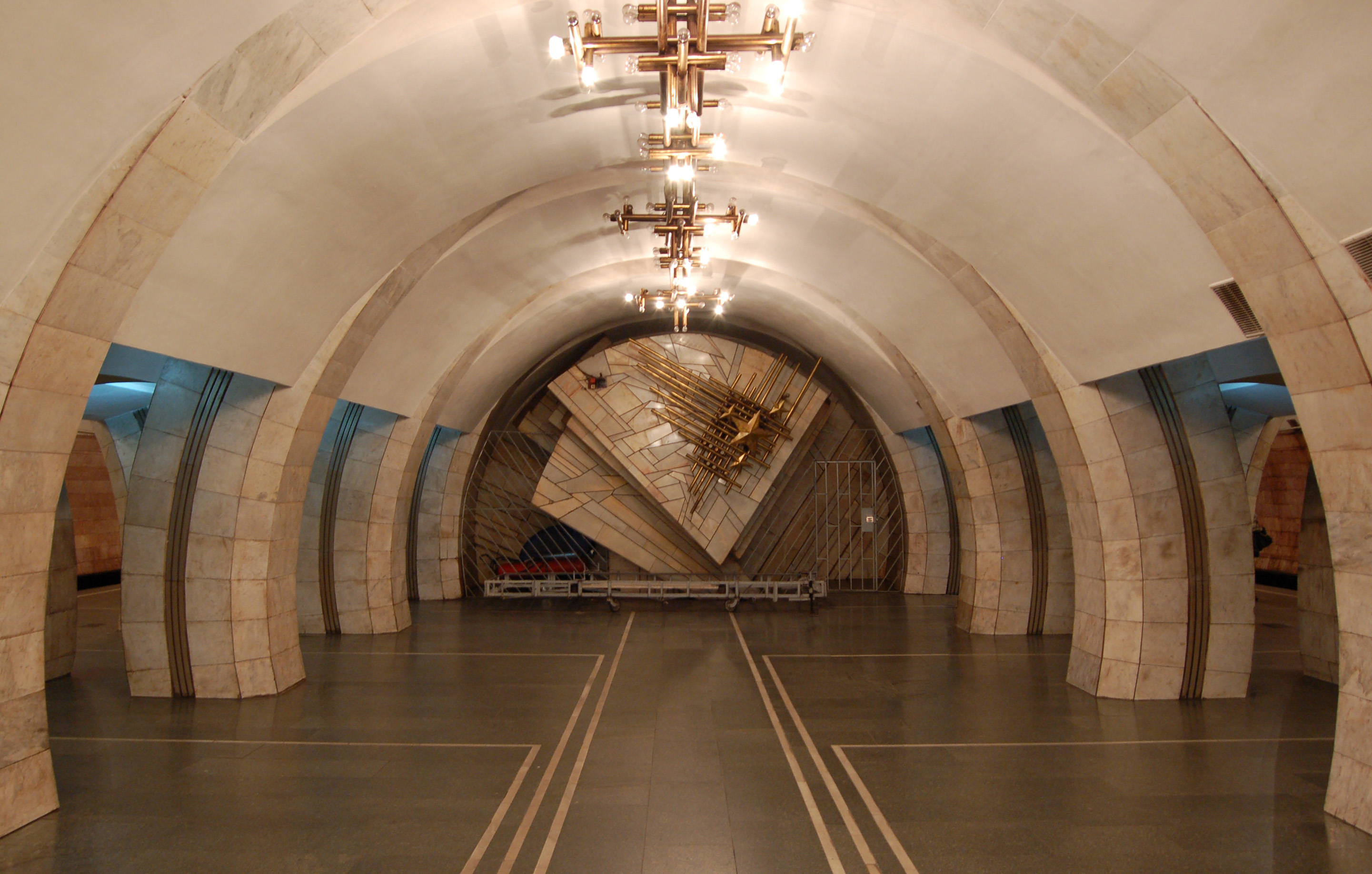

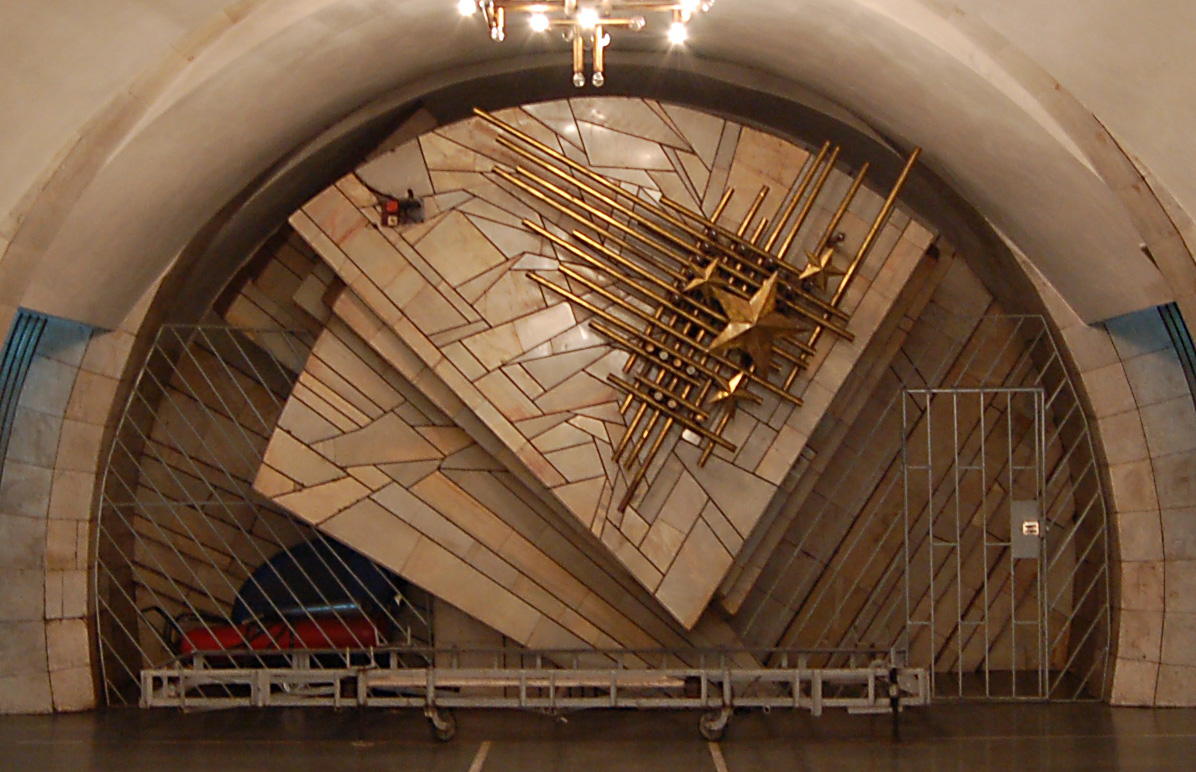

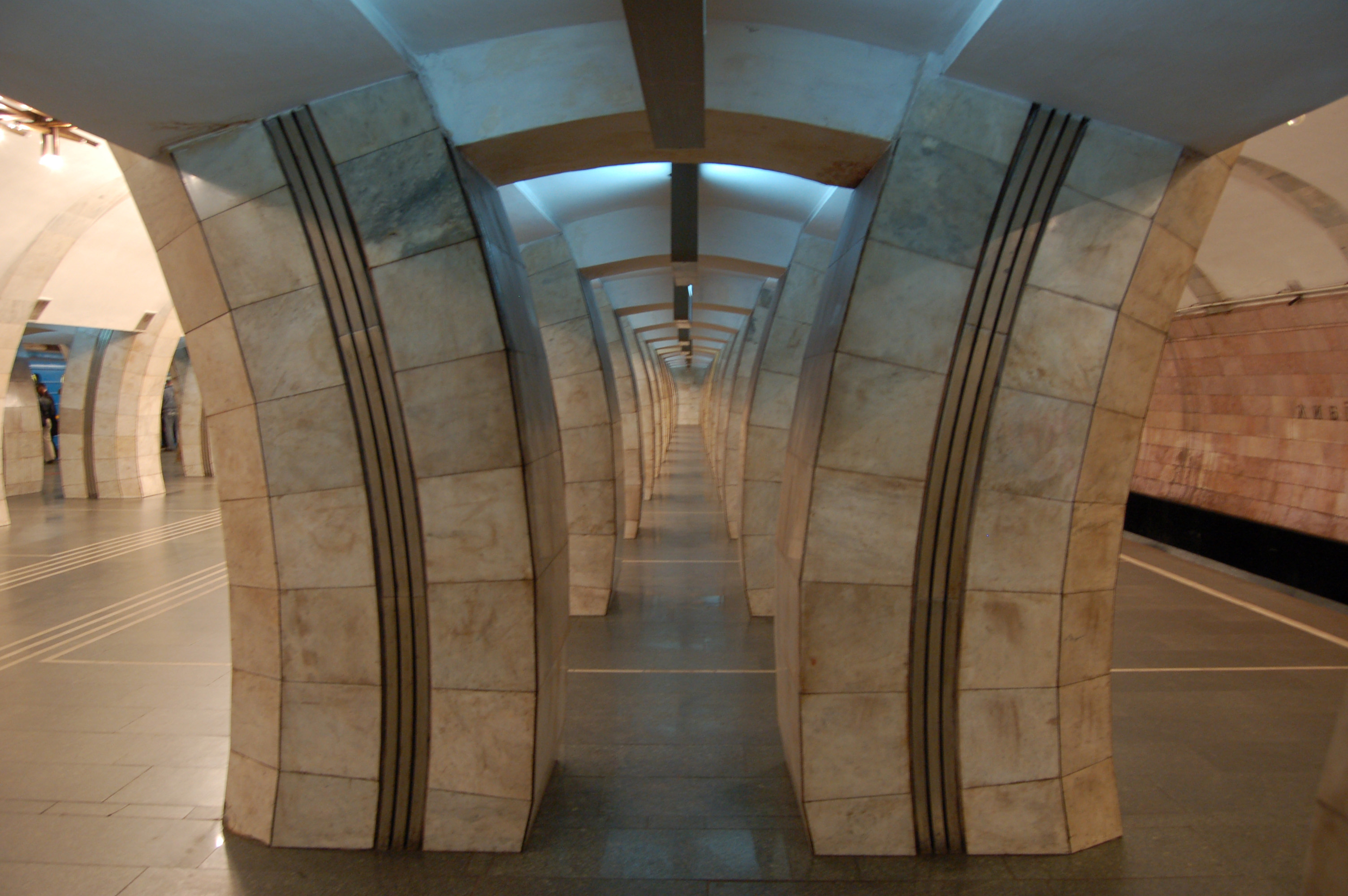

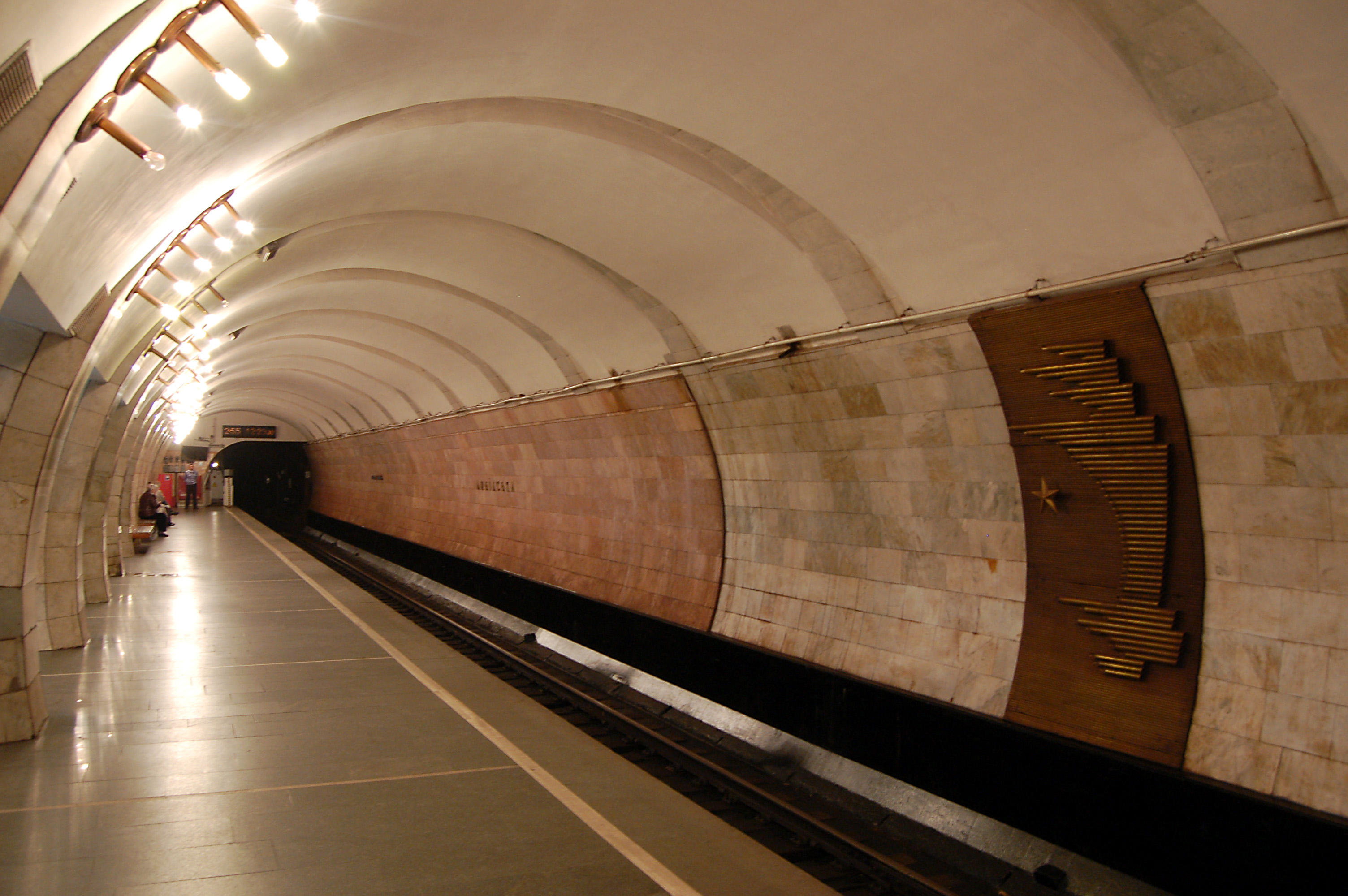

== Publications ==
Works published in books:

- Художники України. Творчо-біогр. альбом-довідник. Вип. 4. (Київ, 2006) (in Ukrainian)
- The Sculpture Reference (USA, 2005)
- Енциклопедія сучасної України (Київ, 2003) (in Ukrainian)
- Художники України. Вип. 1. (Київ, 2000) (in Ukrainian)
- Encyclopedia of Living Artists, 11th Edition. (USA, 1999)
- New Art International (USA, 1998)
- Монументально-декоративне мистецтво в архітектурі України (Київ, 1988) (in Ukrainian)

== References and sources ==
- Художники України: Живопис. Графіка. Скульптура. Декоративно-ужиткове мистецтво: Творчо-біогр. альбом-довідник / авт.-упоряд. С. Журавель. — Київ: Видавець Журавель С. В., 2006. — C. 22–23. — (Серія «Творча Україна»; вип. 4). (in Ukrainian)
- The Sculpture Reference, Arthur Williams, USA, 2005
- Encyclopedia of Living Artists, 11th Edition, ArtNetwork, USA, 1999. — ISBN 978-0940899339
- New Art International // Jeremy Sedley, Eugenia Burklyn, Natalie Gains, JoAnn Chemberlain, Gary Alexander, J. S. Kauffmann, USA, 1998
- Монументально-декоративне мистецтво в архітектурі України, Велігоцька Н. І. 1988 (in Ukrainian)
- Енциклопедія сучасної України. — Т. 2 : «Б-Біо» // Ред. кол: Дзюба І. М., Жуковський А. І. та ін. — Київ: НАН України; Ін-т енциклопедичних досліджень НАН України; Наукове товариство ім. Шевченка, 2003. — 872 с. — ISBN 966-02-2681-0. (in Ukrainian)
- Художники України: Живопис. Графіка. Скульптура. Декоративно-прикладне мистецтво: Творчо-біографічний довідник / Ред.: І. Бугаєнко, С. Журавель. — К.: — 2000. — Вип. 1 (in Ukrainian)
