= Anna Ivanovna Petrova =

Ukrainian artist (born 1962)

Anna Petrova
- Born: September 15, 1962 (age 63); Simferopol, Crimea, University of Painting, Sculpture and Architecture named after I.E. Repin
- Notable work: Mosaic "Resurrection " Church of the Resurrection Foros; Mosaic "Resurrection " and " Alexander Nevsky " in the Chapel of the museum complex 35 coastal battery in Sevastopol; Painting "Christmas" Peter and Paul Church in Kiev; painting the ceiling " Constellations." Resort merchant by Pyotr Gubonina (restoration of the sanatorium " Gurzufsky "

Anna Petrova (born September 15, 1962) is an artist-monumentalist who has made a significant contribution to the creation, recreation and restoration of the historical and religious monuments of the Crimea.

== Biography ==
She was born in Simferopol. in Ukraine, which was then a part of the Soviet Union. Her father, Petrov Ivan Semenovich, was a painter-batalist and her mother, Petrova Nina Petrovna, was a sculptor.

- Has a bachelor's degree in Crimean Art College from 1978 to 1984.
- Has a master of arts degree, with specialization of the monumental art in the class of professor A.A. Mylnikov at the Imperial Academy of Arts from 1984 to 1990

== Public collections ==
- Simferopol Art museum. Ukraine
- Museum historical memorial complex "35th Coastal Battery" Sebastopol. Ukraine
- Museum Foundation "Dragon" State of Taiwan, Russian art collection.
- Museum Podolsky district, Kiev, Ukraine.
- Kunstshtatsion City Museum Fulda, Germany.

== Bibliography ==
- 2013 - The New Florence Biennale ethics dna of art. ISBN 9788895962290
- 2012 - "Issues of restoration works of monumental marble sculptures by the example of household Vorontsov Palace " almanac Crimean international scientific readings.
- 2010 - " Museums and exhibition Invisible Shadows" magazine " Antiques » № 6 (44). Kiev.
- 2009 - "Shoot Beatrice " magazine " Antiques » № 10 (36). Kiev.
- 2008 - " Questions restoration" almanac Thirteenth Crimean art history reading. Simferopol.
- 2007 - «Navdušenje udeležencev likovne kolonije» Sabina Lokar. Dnevnik 19.07.2007- Article 15 Ljubljana, Slovenia. «Fuldaer Zeitung» November 27. Germany.
- 2004 - Magazine "Our » № 9. Dnepropetrovsk. «SYDÖSTRAN» June 8. Karlskrona, Ronneby. Sweden. «BLT» June 8. Blekinge, Sweden. «BLT» May 6. Blekinge, Sweden. «BLT» September 17. Blekinge, Sweden. «Hunfelder Zeitung» № 120.Hunfeld, Germany. " Ukrainian Mistetstvo » (art in Ukraine) № 3. Kiev.
- 2003 - Exhibition Catalogue «Kunst der Halbinsel Krim». Germany. «Fuldaer Zeitung» «Hunfelder Zeitung» № 60. Germany.
- 2002 - magazine " 24 carat » № 11. Kiev. "The Republic of Crimea » № 6.
- 2000 - magazine " 24 carat » № 4 (6). Kiev. "The truth of Ukraine » № 133. Kiev. " Crimean news » № 60 ( 2064 ) " 24 carat " magazine № 3 (5). Kiev. from 1997 to 2004 - design books from publishing house "SONAT" Simferopol.
- 1996 - «Rhein-Neckar Zeitung» 19.12.96
- 1993 - on stamps in the series " Russian art " in the state of Taiwan.
- 1989 - Exhibition Catalogue " Crimean Bookplates 30 years." Crimean ekslibrist club. Simferopol Art Museum.
- 1988 - Catalogue of the exhibition "Painting Mozhdysk ancient." Soviet Art from the Academy: Drawings and paintings by the outstanding young artists from the I. E. Repin Institute, Leningrad, the historic art academy of the Soviet Union. By: Boris Ugarov David B. Lawell M. Stephen Doherty Gregory Hedberg (Foreword) Russell Wilkinson (Preface) B000JUXI4G. Publisher: New York Academy of Art - 1988 (Academy of Art in New York).
- 1984 - Exhibition Catalogue "Simferopol and Simferopol townspeople"
