= Sergey Lunov =

Sergey Lunov (other spellings: Sergei Luniov, Lunyov, Lunev) (Ukrainian: Сергiй Омелянович Луньов; Russian: Сергей Емельянович Лунев; 4 November 1909 – 7 February 1978) was a Ukrainian painter, graphic artist and watercolorist.

Sergey Lunov was born on 4 November 1909 in the small village of Kekino, now in Sumy Oblast in Ukraine in a family of a teacher. In Sumy Luniov attended the art studio of the Ukrainian artist, poet and teacher N. H. Onatsky during the 1920s. S. Lunov completed his formal education in painting at Kharkiv Arts College (1928–32), where he studied art under Aleksey Kokel and V. A. Riftin. Member of the Union of Artists of the USSR since 1958. The artist presented his works in many mixed and private exhibits within the USSR and abroad: Czechoslovak Socialist Republic (1971); Soviet Federal Republic of Yugoslavia (1971); Mexico (1972); the People's Republic of Hungary (1975). Personal exhibitions in Kharkiv: 1960, 1963, 1965, 1975, 1990, 1999, 2009. Kiev: 1965, 1996. Moscow: 1973. Middletown, Ohio, USA: 1993. Cincinnati, Ohio, USA: 1994. Berlin, Germany: 1995

The private exhibit of Sergey Lunov's works dedicated to the 100-year anniversary of the artist took place in the Kharkiv Art Museum in November–December 2009.

Two volume book album about S. Lunov's life and art work was published in 2009–2011.

== Bibliography ==
- Contemporary Ukrainian Watercolors "Mystetstvo" publishers, 1978, Kyiv (Ukrainian: Сучасна Українська Акварель, "Мистецтво", 1978, Київ)
- Contemporary Soviet Watercolors "Sovetsky Khudozhnik" publishers, 1983, Moscow (Russian: Современная Советская Акварель, "Советский Художник", 1983, Москва)
- Sergey Lunov, Volume 1, 2009, Kharkov ISBN 978-966-8603-96-9 (Ukrainian: Сергiй Луньов, книга перша, 2009, Харкiв)
- Sergey Lunov, Volume 2, 2011, Kharkov ISBN 978-617-578-040-4 (Ukrainian: Сергiй Луньов, книга друга, 2011, Харкiв)
