= Katerina Omelchuk =

Ukrainian artist (born 1982)

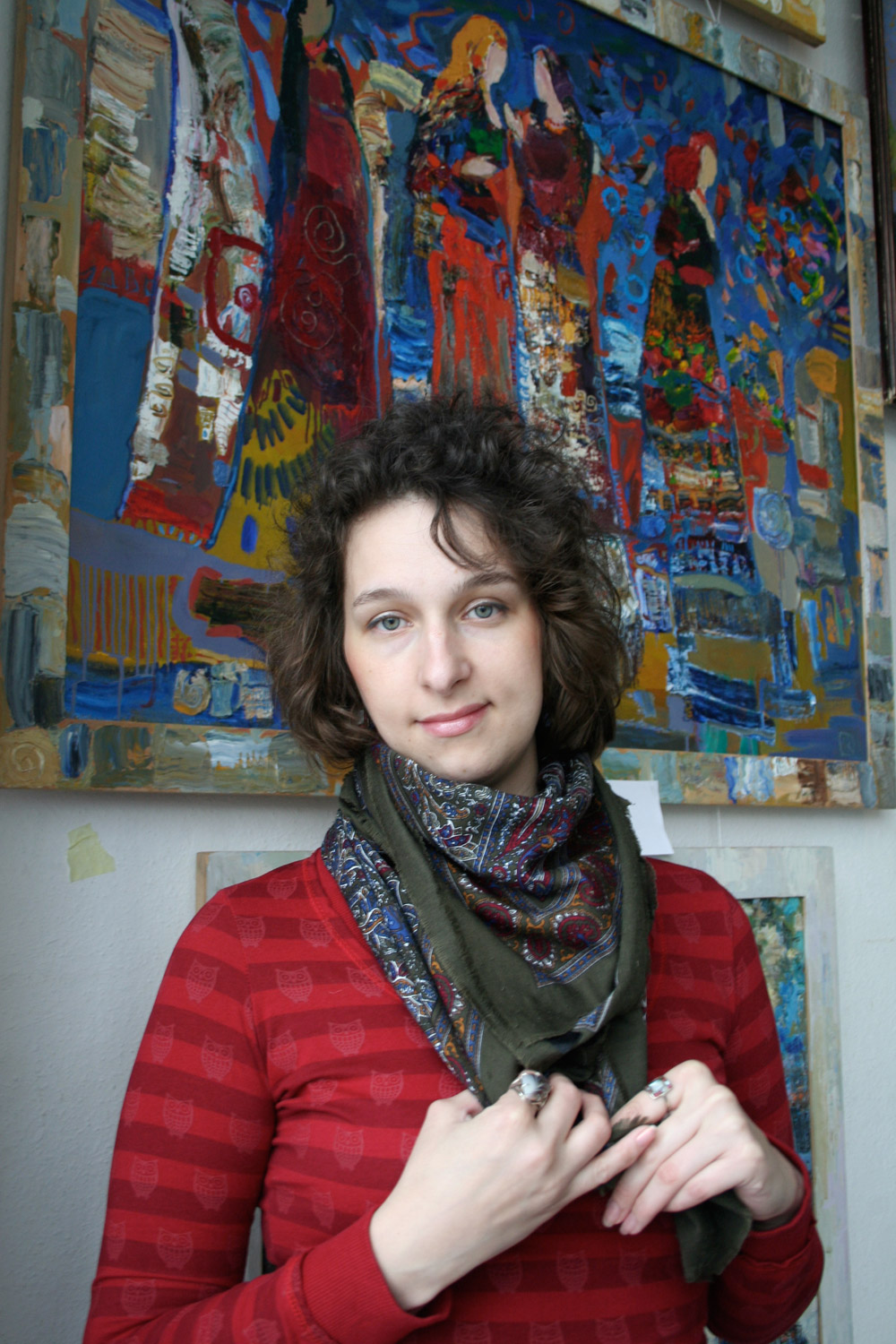
- Ukrainian fine artist
- Born: Katerina Volodymyrivna Omelchuk; March 17, 1982 (age 43); Ukraine, Kyiv
- Education: Ukrainian National Academy of Fine Arts and Architecture
- Known for: painting
- Movement: Figurative symbolism, landscape
- Awards: Member of National Painters Union of Ukraine.
- Website: omelchuk.com

Katerina Volodymyrivna Omelchuk (Ukrainian: Катерина Володимирівна Омельчук), (March 17, 1982) is a Ukrainian painter and a member of The National Painters Union of Ukraine.

== Life ==
Omelchuk was born in 1982. She paints landscape, still life, portrait, as well as in the style of figurative symbolism. Works by Omelchuk are in private collections in Ukraine.

== Education ==
- 1992 — 2000 Shevchenko State Artistic Secondary School. Teachers of art Goncharenko J. E., Davidova T. V.
- 1996 — 1998 studied at the studio of art design at Kyiv State University of Culture and Art. Achieved a diploma of ‘Artistic-design Studio Manager' and got a profession tutor of artistic design.
- 2000 — 2006 studied at National Academy of Fine Arts and Architecture on painting restoration faculty.
- 2004 — member of a youth association attached to the National Painters Union of Ukraine.
- 2008 — member of National Painter's Union of Ukraine.

Whilst studying in academy Katerina participated in creative plein-air and master classes under the artistic direction of G. M. Yagodkin and I. J. Melnichuk, as well as attending the art studio of V. I. Zabashta. Among the teachers in particular have influenced the formation of creative personality painting masters such as: Alexander Sheremet, Heinrich (Genadiy) N. Yagodkin, Natalia Vyatcheslavovna Zozulia, Vasily Ivanovich Zabashta and Igor Yulianovich Melnichuk.

== Creative activity ==
Her first exhibition was in 2000 which took place in the city of Kyiv. Won prizes of creative youth forum in Kyiv in the nomination «Paintings, drawings, sculpture» in (2005–2008). The participant of more than 40 Ukrainian, international and personal art exhibitions. Among which the most significant:

- Art event «Kyivska suite» sponsored by a Grant of the President of Ukraine, NSHU, Kiev (2005).
- International Exhibition of Artists of Ukraine and Italy «Under the wing of the Holy Archangel Michael», Kyiv – Rome (2006).
- International Art Lvovskiy Autumn Salon «High Castle – 2008», the Palace of Fine Arts, Lviv.
- Ukraine-wide triennial «Painting – 2007», organized by the National Union of Artists of Ukraine in Kyiv (2007).
- «Ukraine from Tripolya to modernity» (2008), NSHU, Kyiv.
