= Yevhen Yehorov =

Ukrainian artist (1917–2005)

Yevhen Pavlovych Yehorov
- Євген Павлович Єгоров
- Born: May 17, 1917; Lyman, Donetsk Oblast, Ukraine
- Died: May 4, 2005 (aged 87); Kharkiv, Ukraine
- Education: Kharkiv State Academy of Design and Arts
- Notable work: Coat of arms of Kharkiv
- Awards: Honored Artist of Ukraine

Yevhen Pavlovych Yehorov (Ukrainian: Євген Павлович Єгоров; 17 May 1917 – 4 May 2005) was a Ukrainian graphic artist, painter, and professor, and an Honored Artist of Ukraine.

== Biography ==
Yevhen Pavlovych Yehorov was born in Lyman, Donetsk Oblast, Ukraine on May 17, 1917, in the family of a railway worker.

In 1939, he volunteered to fight with the Red Army, participating in the Winter War. During World War II, he fought as part of the Soviet 8th Tanks Corps, fighting in the Fourth Battle of Kharkiv, Battle of Stalingrad, Battle of Kursk, Warsaw Uprising, and the Battle of Berlin. He returned to Ukraine disabled, and kept a piece of the Reichstag building as a souvenir on the wall of his workshop.

He attended the Kharkiv State Academy of Design and Arts, where he was mentored by Aleksey Kokel. After graduating in 1949, he began working at the university in the department of drawing.

In 1958, he became a member of the National Union of Artists of Ukraine. The following year, he was made associate professor and head of the department of drawing at the Kharkiv State Academy of Design and Arts. Throughout his career, he held a number of exhibitions of his work, including in Kharkiv in 1957, 1967, 1972, 1977, and 1987, in Kyiv in 1969, 1972, and 1987, and in Harbin, China in 1997.

In 1974, he was promoted to the position of professor at the university.

He died in Kharkiv in 2005, at the age of 87.

== Legacy ==
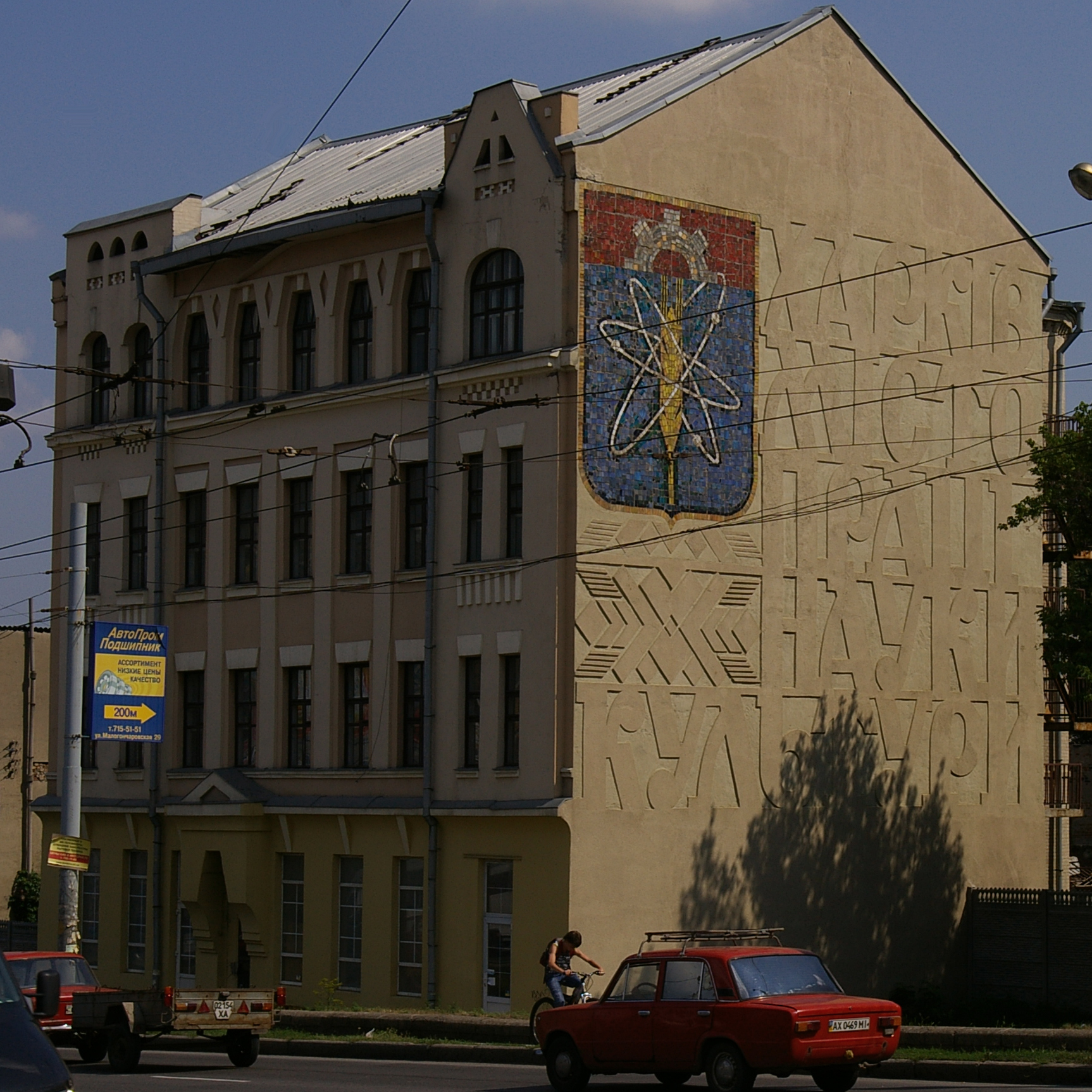
A building in Kharkiv with a mural displaying the coat of arms designed by Yehorov in 2009

Many of Yehorov's works are still visible today. In 1968, Yehorov designed the coat of arms of Kharkiv, which remained in use from 1968 to 1995. Although modified after Ukraine gained its independence, the coat of arms continues to enjoy significance as a symbol of Kharkiv today.

Some of Yehorov's drawings continue to be displayed in the museum of the Kharkiv State Academy of Design and Arts.

In 2006, the Kharkiv State Academy of Design and Arts installed a memorial plaque commemorating Yehorov's accomplishments as an artist and a professor at the university.
