= Eduard Gudzenko =

Ukrainian expressionist artist

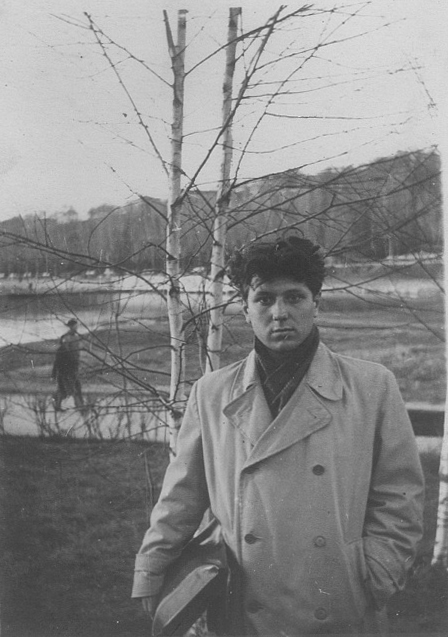
Eduard Gudzenko in 1961

Eduard Gudzenko (1938–2006) was a Ukrainian expressionist artist. He was largely unknown to the general public during his lifetime, due to the unconventional style and subject matter, which diverged from official expectations. Gudzenko was rediscovered in the 2000s.

== Biography ==
Gudzenko was born in Cherkasy, Ukraine in 1938. During his lifetime, Gudzenko's attempts to exhibit his work were criticized, both by official authorities and by colleagues in the shop. Later, the artist was accused of Jewish cosmopolitanism, in particular, for the work "Self-Portrait in a Yarmulke", exhibited in the Cherkasy Gallery in 1980. Gudzenko had only one personal exhibition, in 1987.

His career became known only after his death through the promotion of admirers of his work who organized his first personal exhibition in 2007 (a year after his death) in his hometown at the Cherkasy Art Museum. In 2008, his works were shown in Kyiv.

In 2014-2015, Russian connoisseurs of fine arts were able to get acquainted with the works of the Ukrainian artist for the first time. This became possible thanks to the exhibition of his works, which were presented to the general public in the Marble Hall of the Russian Museum, in St. Petersburg. In 2017, a solo exhibition was held in the halls of the art gallery of Zurab Tsereteli, the department of the Russian Academy of Arts, in Moscow. The retrospective exposition presented more than 70 works. The exhibition consisted of several thematic blocks and covered the artist's work from early sketches of the late 1950s, graphic sketches, to his latest canvases of the early 2000s. On meter canvases landscapes and still lifes, portraits, genre scenes and decorative fantasies.

Art historians note that for the works of this provincial artist such features are inherent, such as - a broad brush, a pasty brushstroke, an open color. His works are fundamentally different from ethnographic painting and from the official art of that period.

== Reception ==
Alexander Yakimovich ( Doctor of Arts, Art historian, and full member of the Russian Academy of Arts ) :

"Looking at his paintings and drawings, one would be hard put to guess that the person who created them had such a hard life. In his works Gudzenko appears to be a free artist in the very same sense as was posited by the Renaissance artists. The artist, inexorably greedy for visual impressions, was passionately emotional and ready to splash onto a canvas his impressions and experiences. The artist’s eye was designed in such a way that he saw drama and comedy and tragedy in combinations of color hues; he saw irony and sarcasm in the texture of a brushstroke, in combinations of forms. His soul and mind were directly connected to his eye, and his eye to his hand. The free and creative nature, as described in Goethe’s Faust, is a curious and mistrustful personality that looks intently at real life and reveals its hidden aspects to people. It has no fear, and refuses to consider standards, prohibitions, and canons of official ideologies as something binding."

== Exhibitions ==
=== Personal exhibitions ===
- 2007 - "Eduard Gudzenko. 1938-2006 », Cherkassy, Museum of Fine Arts, September 19 - September 29
- 2008 - "Eduard Gudzenko. 1938-2006 », Kyiv, National Union of Artists of Ukraine, March 13 - March 24
- 2014-2015 - "Eduard Gudzenko. 1938-2006 », St. Petersburg, Russian Museum, December 18 - February 16
- 2017 - "Eduard Gudzenko. 1938-2006 ", Moscow, Russian Academy of Arts, February 28 - March 26

=== Collective exhibitions ===
- 1966 - Republican exhibition of works by young artists of the Ukrainian SSR, Kyiv
- 1987 - Exhibition of works by young artists Yevgeny Nayden, Eduard Gudzenko, Sergei Sosulin in the Cherkasy organization of the Union of Artists of Ukraine of the Ukrainian SSR, Cherkassy. Published in catalog of Cherkassy, Oblpoligraizdat, 1987
- 2007, November 1–10 - exhibition at Art-Kyiv, in the gallery of the Charitable Foundation "Cultural Heritage and Contemporary Art", Ukrainian House, Kyiv,. Catalog "Art-Kyiv", Kyiv.

== Literature ==
- 2006 - Magazine National Society of Artists of Ukraine "Fine Arts". Article about Eduard Gudzenko by Alexander Nayden and Alexander Fedoruk
- 2008 - The magazine about antiques and collecting "Antiquary" 2008. Article by Oleg Sidor-Gibelinda
- 2008 - Magazine of the National Art Museum of Ukraine "Museum Patch". Article by Oksana Barshinova
- 2014 - "Eduard Gudzenko". 1938-2006, 264 pages. Publishing house - State Russian Museum, "Palace Edition" ISBN 978-5-93332-488-1

== Sources ==
- Выставка произведений Эдуарда Гудзенко (1938-2006)
- ВЫСТАВКА ПРОИЗВЕДЕНИЙ ЭДУАРДА ГУДЗЕНКО (1938-2006), Russian Academy of Arts
- Эдуард Гудзенко, Russian Museum

== Links ==
Eduard Gudzenko's official website
