= Boris Nesterenko =

USSR Union of Artists

Boris Nesterenko (Ukrainian: Нестеренко Борис Григорович) (7 August 1914 - 7 December 1988) was a member of the USSR Union of Artists, a participant of many art exhibitions and some foreign auctions. His works are on show in many of the Ukrainian and foreign museums, galleries and private collections.

== Biography ==
Boris Nesterenko was born in Pinsk (a town in the Russian Empire, the Republic of Belarus today). From 1921 to 1939, Pinsk was part of the Second Polish Republic. His father headed the Gomel steam engine repair workshops (founded in 1874 as the steam engine wagon repair workshops of Libau-Romny railway). The large family had nine children: the younger ones, twins Boris and Gleb, became artists. In 1934, they joined Vitebsk People’s Art School, the art school associated with such famous artists as Marc Chagall, and his teacher Yehuda Pen, Mstislav Dobuzhinsky, Kazimir Маlevich, Ivan Puni, Robert Falk and many other.

After graduating from the Art College in 1939, Boris Nesterenko entered the Leningrad Institute for Painting, Sculpture and Architecture on the recommendation of his teachers, but did not get a chance to study since he was called up for military service in the same year to serve as a tank commander. Subsequently he moved to the BSSR in a paratroop drop where he organized a partisan party and conducted sabotage efforts on the communications of the German fascist invaders. Boris Nesterenko was the commissar of a partisan detachment in Belarus, Baranovichi region.

After the war he worked as the Head of Regional Department of Arts in Baranovichi and was a member of the BSSR Union of Artists. In 1950 he moved to Kiev, and from that time on Ukraine became the main subject of his art and life. He participated in decorations of the All Union Agricultural Exhibition, worked for the Kiev Partnership of Artists and the Kiev Regional Branch of the Artistic Fund of Ukraine. The artist, participant of World War II, was awarded many orders and medals.

== Work ==
Boris Nesterenko was a professional two dimensional artist rated 3B (according to the United Art Rating, one of instruments of the civilized art-market formation) widely recognized by public and the art market. In his works, Boris Nesterenko combined elements of the traditional soviet, Ukrainian and Belarusian art schools, academic social realism and the so-called “soviet impressionism”.

He worked in different genres of the easel painting - including marine and municipal landscapes. He also painted old Kiev. Some of his subjects included scenes of Vydubichi, Kyiv-Pechersk Lavra, also cultural Sedniv, the location of the Art Centre of Ukrainian Artists. Many landscapes of Sedniv are depicted in works of a well-known Ukrainian painter Tetyana Yablonska. Apart from landscapes he painted a number of portraits in various genres such as historical (specifically, Leniniana), genre-art, life-genre, as well as social realism and soviet impressionism, in oils, tempera, and pencil. The chronology of his works covers 1950s to the 1980s.

Boris Nesterenko was the participant of many republican and all-union exhibitions. His works are in the collections of Donetsk Art Museum (“Partisan” 1971, “Evening Desna” 1972), Khmelnitsky Regional Museum (“In Hard War Years” 1974), Kramatorsk Art Museum ("Still Life" 1979) etc. His paintings are also found in private collections, galleries, and the collections of such institutions as universities, institutes, banks, libraries: “Dnepr Subway Station” 1964, “Foreman” 1972, “In the Artist̓̓’s Workshop” 1975, “Inspiration” (“Tchaykoffski Working“) 1976, "On Old Roads" 1977, “Fields Leftwards and Fields Rightwards” 1985, “Enchantress” 1986, "Dnepr Distances" 1987, “Dnipro High Water” 1987, “Our Plan Worked” 1988, etc. “Hard Tasks” 1956, “Guard”, and other paintings were sold in foreign auctions in France, Italy and other countries.

== Exhibitions ==
After the artist’s death, a personal exhibition of his picturesque paintings was held in Kiev House of Artists.

In the 90s, a lot of his works were taken abroad by gallerists and their whereabouts were lost forever. In the centennial of his birth, a retrospective exhibition of his works was arranged in the Ivan Kavaleridze Studio-Museum.
