= Mykola Tseluiko =

Ukrainian artist (1937–2007)

Mykola Tseluiko Микола Целуйко
- Tseluiko at work
- Born: Mykola Ivanovych Tseluiko; Микола Іванович Целуйко; 3 July 1937; Slatyne, Derhachi Raion, Kharkiv Oblast
- Died: 31 October 2007 (aged 70); Kherson
- Education: Lviv National Academy of Arts

Mykola Ivanovych Tseluiko (Ukrainian: Микола Іванович Целуйко, also 'Tseluyko'; 3 July 1937, Slatyne – 31 October 2007, Kherson) was a Ukrainian painter and textile artist.

== Early life ==
Tseluiko was born and spent his early childhood in Slatyne, Derhachi Raion, Kharkiv Oblast. Tseluiko was the third and youngest child in the family. After his father went missing in the World War II (1944), his family moved to Lviv, where they lived on Parkova (Park) Street.

== Studies ==
From 1959 to 1965, Mykola Tseluiko studied in the Lviv State Institute of Applied and Decorative Art (now Lviv National Academy of Arts), specializing in the artistic design of fabrics.

== Career ==
In 1965, Tseluiko moved to the Kherson Cotton Combine as a fabric pattern artist. He worked there for the rest of his life. He became a leading artist at the Combine, which was the largest textile factory in the USSR.

Tseluiko "created patterns for jacquard curtain and drapery fabrics making creative use of the Ukrainian folk art motifs and sketches from nature".

Under the Communist system, patterns could only be brought into production when they had been reviewed and approved by the artistic council first in Kyiv by the Ukrainian Institute of Light Industry, and then in Moscow by the All-Union Institute of Light Industry. These reviews were held three times per year. Tseluiko created "hundreds of square meters of sketches", and "hundreds of thousands of square meters of fabrics" were made by the Kherson Cotton Combine from his designs.

Tseluiko also taught and supervised students at the Lviv State Institute of Applied and Decorative Art. He became chief lecturer of Weaving and Design at the Kherson State Technological University. He taught Basics of Composition and Drawing and Textile Products Design.

== Style ==
Mykola Tseluiko painted with tempera and water-color on paper. Most of his works were painted from nature: he took a sketchbox, a board, and sheets of paper, and went sketching. He painted very quickly in a single session.

He often went on painting trips: he travelled, sketching and painting in the Crimea, the Carpathian Mountains, the Caucasus including Baku, Central Asia including Samarkand and Bukhara, the Baltic including Tallinn, Moldova, and Russia.

== Artistic heritage ==
Mykola Tseluiko’s creative heritage is not limited to his work as a textile artist. All his life he gathered ethnographic materials, which he subsequently used in developing fabric patterns; he wove thematic "Gobelin" tapestries, particularly the handmade carpets Tavrian Legend (1968), Flaming Years (1970), and the decorative panel Musician (1969) are mentioned in the Dictionary of Ukrainian Artists; and he created many tempera paintings.

Mykola Tseluiko died on 31 October 2007. He is buried in Kherson.

== Exhibitions and awards ==
- 1968 — 2nd Exhibition of Cotton Combine Artists, Kherson, Culture Palace for Textile Industry Workers.
- 1974 — 3d Republican Exhibition of Watercolor, Kyiv.
- 1975 — Republican Exhibition, New Samples of Folk Decorative Art for Mass and Serial Production, Kyiv.
- 1977 — International Industrial Exhibition of Fabrics, Leipzig (German Democratic Republic).
- 1978 — Honorary diploma of the Ministry of Light Industry of the USSR.
- 1981 — International Industrial Exhibition of Fabrics, Brno, (Czechoslovakia).
- 1981 — 1st prize at the Republican Competition Dedicated to Kyiv's 1500th Anniversary.
- 1987 — International exhibitions of textile products in Czechoslovakia, Libya, and France.
- 1987 — Anniversary personal exhibition, Kherson, Kherson Cotton Combine.
- 1997 — Anniversary personal exhibition, Kherson, Kherson Cotton Combine.
- 1999 — All-Ukrainian Exhibition of Amateur Pictorial Art, Kyiv, Ukrainian House.
- 2009 – Exhibition of tempera paintings by Mykola Tseluyko at the Andrey Sheptytsky National Museum of Lviv

Tseluiko also won several of the Textile Industry Scientific and Technical Community's competitions.

From the 1960s, the Kherson Cotton Combine produced most of the country's textiles. Tseluiko used to joke that wherever he visited, there was always an exhibition of his works on display.

== Bibliography ==
- M. Bazhan; V. Afanasiev; P. Biletskiy (1973). "Mykola Ivanovych Tseluiko". Dictionary of Ukrainian Artists. Kyiv, Ukraine: Kyiv: Main Office of Ukrainian Soviet Encyclopedia. p. 245.
- Ukrainian Art Studies-Kyiv: Naukova Dumka, 1968. Pages 115, 117.
- Modern Ukrainian Artists-Kyiv: Naukova Dumka, 1985. Pages 29, 51.
