= Alexandr Guristyuk =

Ukrainian painter

Alexandr Guristyuk is a Ukrainian painter.

== Biography ==
He was born on June 2, 1959, in the village Yaroshivka, Chernigov area of Ukraine, into a military family. He studied at art school for two years. He was expelled for bad behaviour.

Guristyuk has worked in art workshops at the Rivne organisation of the National union of artists of Ukraine since 1989.

He participated in regional and national art exhibitions from 1990. He had personal exhibitions in Rivne (1990, 1994, 1999, 2000, 2004, 2006, 2007), Lutsk (1996, 1998), Kyiv (2000, 2001, 2006), Lviv (2003), Lublin (Poland, 2004), and Preshov (Slovakia, 2006). He participated in the second international art open-air which was devoted to the Day of Preshov city, Slovakia (May 28 – June 9, 2006).

== Career ==
Alekzander Guristyuk has the creative arsenal of about 500 different-genre and differently-styled pictures. In recent years, he worked in a nativity style. Amongst his paintings, many are of female portraits.

He work in the genres of still-life, portrait, landscape, and genre composition.

In 1980 Guristyuk revolted against the system and "social circus" that is displayed in pictures "Head of the Set," "Members of the Rivne Party," "Night," "New Year's Hours," and "Feast." At the end of the 1990s, he the artist painted on ethnic and religion themes. He has worked in these styles to this day.

The main series: "Polissya", "Fables", "Christ".

The main pictures:

- "The Grandfather kisses the woman", a genre composition (1999)
- "Talalayivske tango", a portrait (2000)
- "The Uncle from Polissya", a portrait (2001)
- "A potato Holiday", a genre composition (2004)
- "Twelve", genre composition (2005)
- "Poyizdok", a genre composition (2005)

Guristyuk's pictures are in private collections in Ukraine, Poland, France, Germany, Portugal, Israel, Australia, and the United States of America.

== Exhibitions ==
- "My dear women" Rivne, (1990, 1994, 1999, 2000, 2004, 2006)
- The Exhibition in Lutsk (1996, 1998)
- "In a captivity of a dark background", Kyiv, gallery "Irena" (2000)
- National exhibition devoted to the 10th anniversary of the independence of Ukraine, Kyiv (2001)
- National exhibition devoted to the 15th anniversary of the independence of Ukraine, Kyiv (2006)
- National art exhibition "Colorful Ukraine", Lviv (2003)
- National art exhibition "Colorful Ukraine", Kyiv (2006)
- National art exhibition of "15 years of Chernobyl", Kyiv (2001)
- "The Narrow-gauge railway. 106 kilometres of Polissya", Rivne (2004)
- "Ocheret meni buv za kolisku", Morochne (2005)
- "Polissya" Lublin, (Poland, 2004)
- The exhibition in Preshov (Slovakia, 2006)
- Gallery "Zuza" opening, Rivne (2007)

== Literature ==
- "Catfish-serdjukova О" «For полоні dark тла»//the Directory of persons. виставки живопису O.Guristjuka in a galley ї «Ірена». К, 2000, 13-27 липня
- "Красько M". "Кітова Л" «Очерет мені був for колиску»//Волинь, 2005, 22 lindens
- "Райські" Небелиц і "Гурістюка" //City Life, N4 (21), 2006, квітень
- "Орлова Д". «Заморочки under the complete program»//the VIP, No. 26, 2005, on July 22
- «Treasures of light, darkness treasure»//the VIP, No. 23, 2006, on June 23
- "Ярчук About". «Від крилатих фалосів to богоподібних жінок»//Рівне a foreshortening, 2003, 17 липня
- «Небилиці in лицях від Гуристюка» //Рівне a foreshortening, No. 262, 2006, 19 жовтень
- «the Photo for нащадків або Полісся - forever!» //«Рівне a foreshortening», No. 207, 2005, 18 липня
- "Угринчук І". «Морочні пейзажі: Червоній і вкопані берізки» //Рівне Вечірн є, No. 52, 2005, 21 липня
- «Обличчя Полісся» //Рівне Вечірн є, No. 77, 2004, 21 жовт
- "Pidgora-Gvjazdovsky Я" "Exhibitions" //the Partner, No. 29-30, 17 июля - July 28, 2000
- «Пересувна виставка робіт рівненських художників« Очерет був мені for колиску... »»//Інформаційне agency «Західна інформаційна корпорація»
- "Suponina M." «Goats Have Human Brains ...»//What's on, No. 26, 2000 21 July - 24 August
- «Golden Oldies» Lublin, 2004, 1 December
- "Niemkiewicz K." «Polesie - wystawa»//Program festywalu Najstarsze pieśni Europy, Lublin 2-4 grudnia 2004
