= Sviatchenko =

Sviatchenko (Ukrainian: Святченко) is a Ukrainian and Russian surname. Notable people with the surname include:

- Alexei Sviatchenko (born 1999), Russian-Hungarian pair skater
- Erik Sviatchenko (born 1991), Danish footballer
- Sergei Sviatchenko (born 1952), Ukrainian-born artist
