= Vasiliy Ryabchenko =

Ukrainian artist (born 1954)

- Born: 23 July 1954 (age 72); Odesa, USSR
- Alma mater: K. D. Ushinsky South Ukrainian National Pedagogical University
- Known for: Painting, graphics, photographs, objects, installations
- Movement: expressionism, neo-expressionism, postmodernism
- Awards: "Golden Section" (1996)
- Website: www.vasiliyryabchenko.com

Vasiliy Ryabchenko (born 23 July 1954, in Odesa, USSR) is a Ukrainian painter, photographer, and installation artist. One of the key artists in contemporary Ukrainian art, and the "New Ukrainian Wave".

== Biography ==
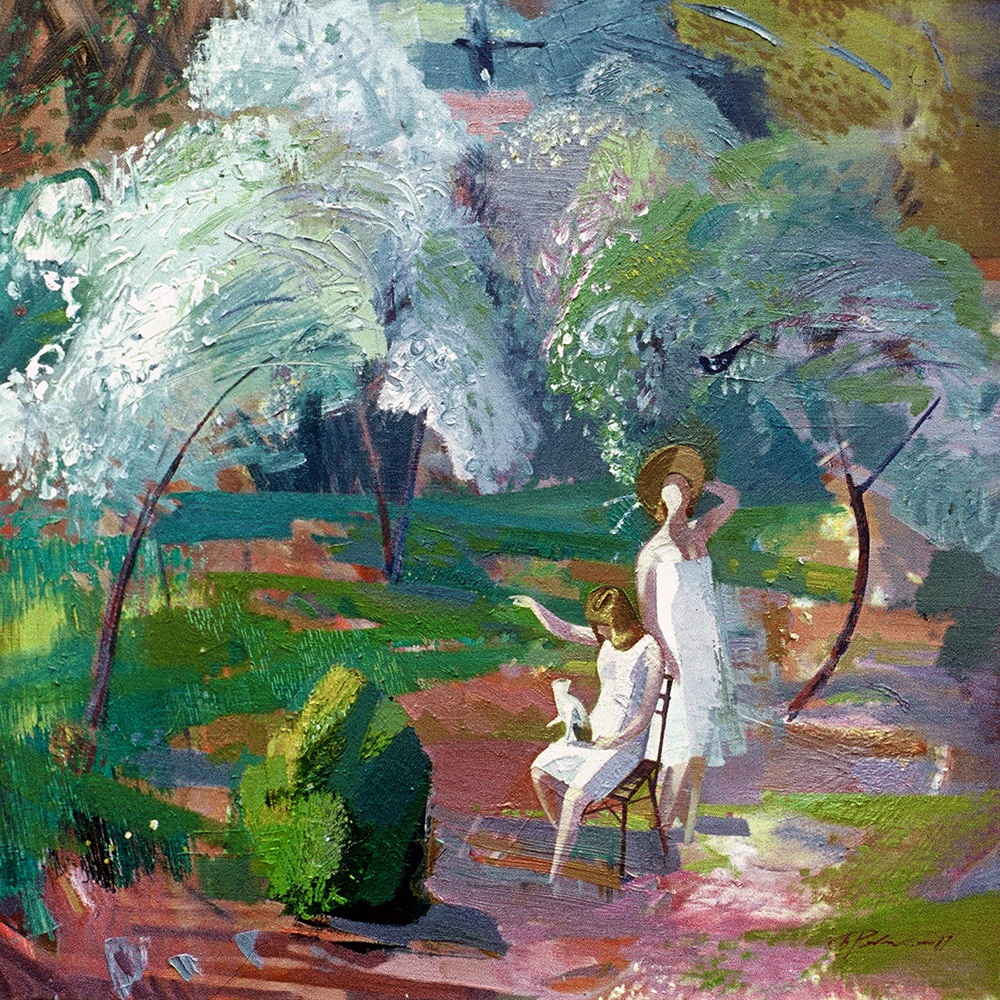
FloweringTime, 70 х 75 cm, oil on canvas, 1987

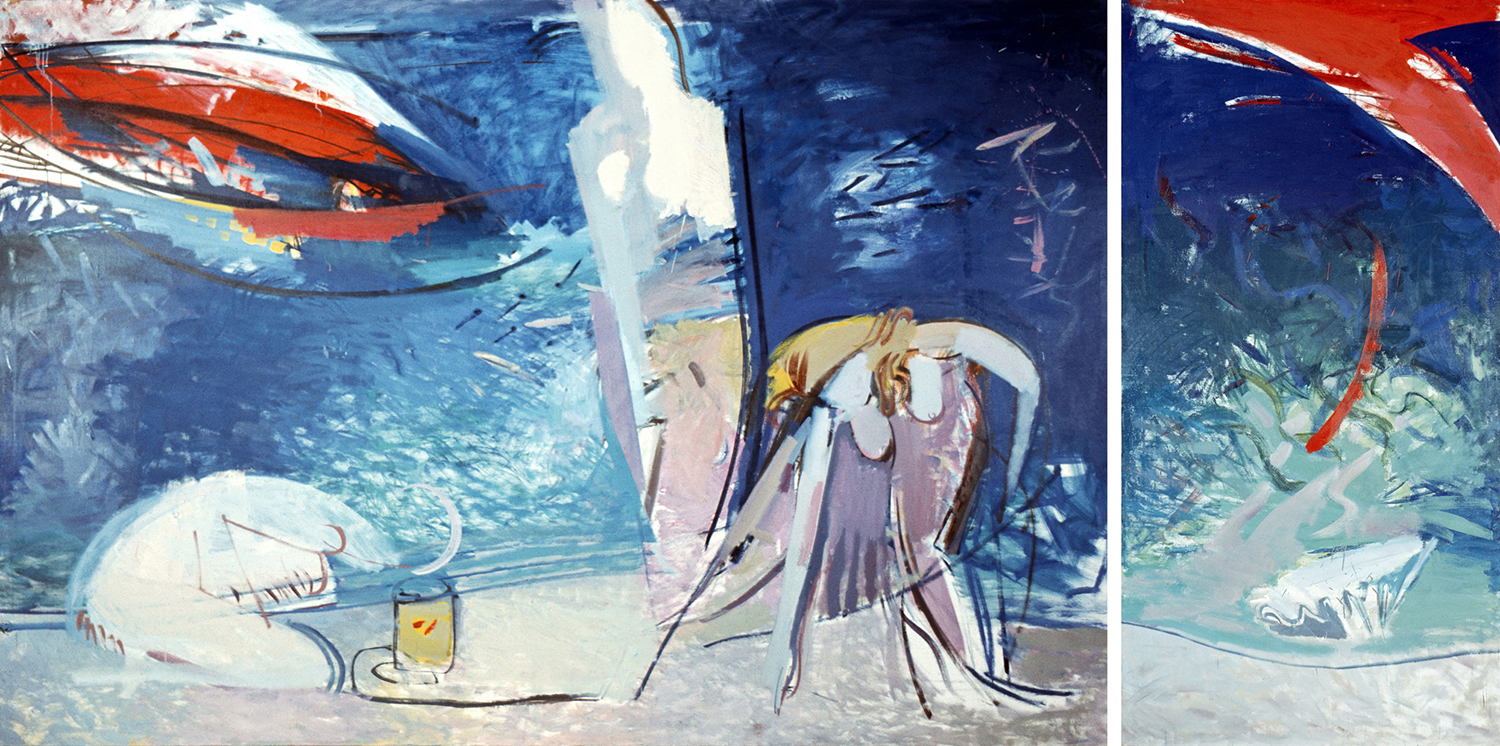
Coast of Unidentified Characters, 200 х 400 cm, oil canvas,1989

Vasiliy Ryabchenko was born on 23 July 1954, in Odesa in the family of a Soviet graphic artist Sergey Ryabchenko.

His art education started in 1966 at the Odesa Art School located on the territory of the Odesa Art College. In 1969, he entered the painting department of the Odesa Art College which was named after M. B. Grekov.

In 1974 – 1976, he was auditing courses at the Leningrad Higher School of Art and Design named after Mukhina in Leningrad. After returning to Odesa, he acquainted and made friends with Valentin Khrushch and others who would be known as the Odesa "nonconformists".

From 1978 to 1983, Vasiliy Ryabchenko studied at the South Ukrainian State Pedagogical University named after K. D. Ushinsky at the art and graphics faculty, where his teachers were Valery Geghamyan and Zinaida Borisyuk.

Since 1987, he is a member of the Union of Artists of the USSR, later the National Union of Artists of Ukraine. During this period, a group of artists from Odesa appeared: Sergey Lykov, Elena Nekrasova, Oleksandr Rojtburd, Vasiliy Ryabchenko. Known as the "Odesa Group". In the late 1980s, this group, which was not very popular among "official" environment of the Union of Artists and wasn't connected with the unofficial environment – these new "nonconformist", held two major high-profile exhibitions "After Modernism 1" and "After Modernism 2" in the space of a state institution, the Odesa Art Museum. The themes, plots of works, and large-scale formats marked the beginning of a new direction in the fine arts of Odesa. This period included paintings from Vasiliy such as: "Coast of Unidentified Characters" (1989), "Red Room" (1988), "Victim" (1989), "Death of Actaeon" (1989), Diptych "Catchers" (1989), "Method of Temptation" (1990) and others.

In between the two above-mentioned exhibitions, an exhibition, "New Figurations", was held at the Odesa Literary Museum, in which, young artists from Kyiv were involved. This was the beginning of the integration of the "Odesa Group" into the context of the all-Ukrainian art movement that was a current trend at that time. Vasiliy Ryabchenko's works which were displayed at that exhibition were: "Rejection of Grace" (1988) and "Love – not Love" (1988).

Vasiliy Ryabchenko, was among the first who started working in the genre of installation, and his very first work in this direction was "Swings for Stumps", for a project "Steppes of Europe" at the Ujazdowski Castle (1993), curated by Jerzy Onukh. Later on, he created a great number of installations: "The Great Bambi" (1994), "Dedication to Madame Recamier" (1994), "Princess" (1996), "Academy of Cold" (1998), and others.

Since the early 1970s, the artist was constantly experimenting with photography. At first, the main subjects were non-staged, still lifes from everyday objects. He followed that by photo fixation of improvisations involving different objects and the human body. In which he used "emptiness" and asymmetry, which was characteristic of the Eastern tradition. He used this style for a series of photographs, which were put together in the project "Naked Dream" (1995). For this project Vasiliy Ryabchenko received an award along with the title of "Best Artist of Ukraine" according to the results of the first all-Ukrainian art festival "Golden Section" in 1996. In the same year he founded a creative association "Art Laboratory".

== Work ==
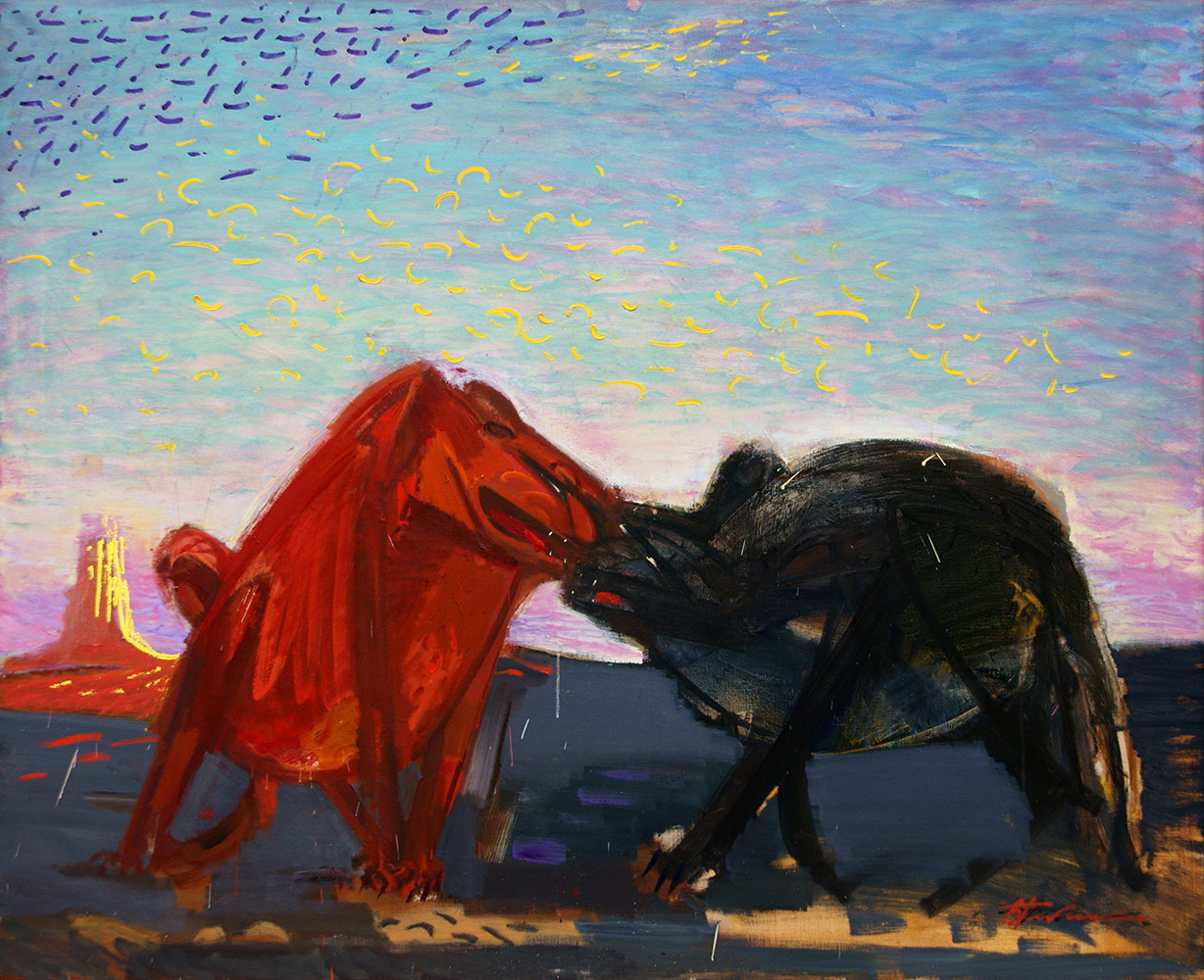
Deterrence, 140 х 170 cm, oil on canvas,1989

Vladimir Levashov identifies several periods in the work of Vasiliy Ryabchenko. The early works of the artist, dating back to the late 1970s – early 80s, are notable for a synthesis of "Western" and "Eastern" approaches to painting: an almost "English" aristocratic asceticism of the language, organically drifting towards the Chinese "dance of a brush", in other words restraint is balanced by freedom and lightness.

In the second half of the 1980s, Vasiliy Ryabchenko got interested in the ideas of the transavantgarde. Yet while in general, the Ukrainian transavantgarde gravitated toward the aesthetics of the baroque, Ryabchenko's works of this time can be described as "new rococo". The transavantgarde period of the artist is characterized by programmatic emptiness, well-balanced aestheticism, frivolous playfulness and mechanistic combinatorics. "Cats" is an example of the works of the second half of the 1980s, which is a story about two rival cats. In the next version, created when relations between the two superpowers were aggravated, which led to the collapse of the USSR, the plot changed its semantic context due to a change in size, color, painting style and the title – "Deterrence".

The "rococo line" can still be seen in Ryabchenko's subsequent works, right up to those created recently. However, they’ve become more emotional and slightly confusing, and a trace of irrationalism and anxiety appear in his paintings. Pastoral carelessness gradually gave way to reflection and growing drama.

Ukrainian art historian and art critic, Mikhail Rashkovetsky, said about Vasiliy Ryabchenko: “In his works Vasiliy Ryabchenko is a mediator of objective emptiness along the laws of beauty. Moreover, figurativeness does not diminish, but enhances this intention. To embody the vacuum, the artist multiplies the elegance of rocaille, the stylization of modernity and the luxury of the high-society baroque by the absolute deconstruction of mythological meanings.”

== Exhibitions ==
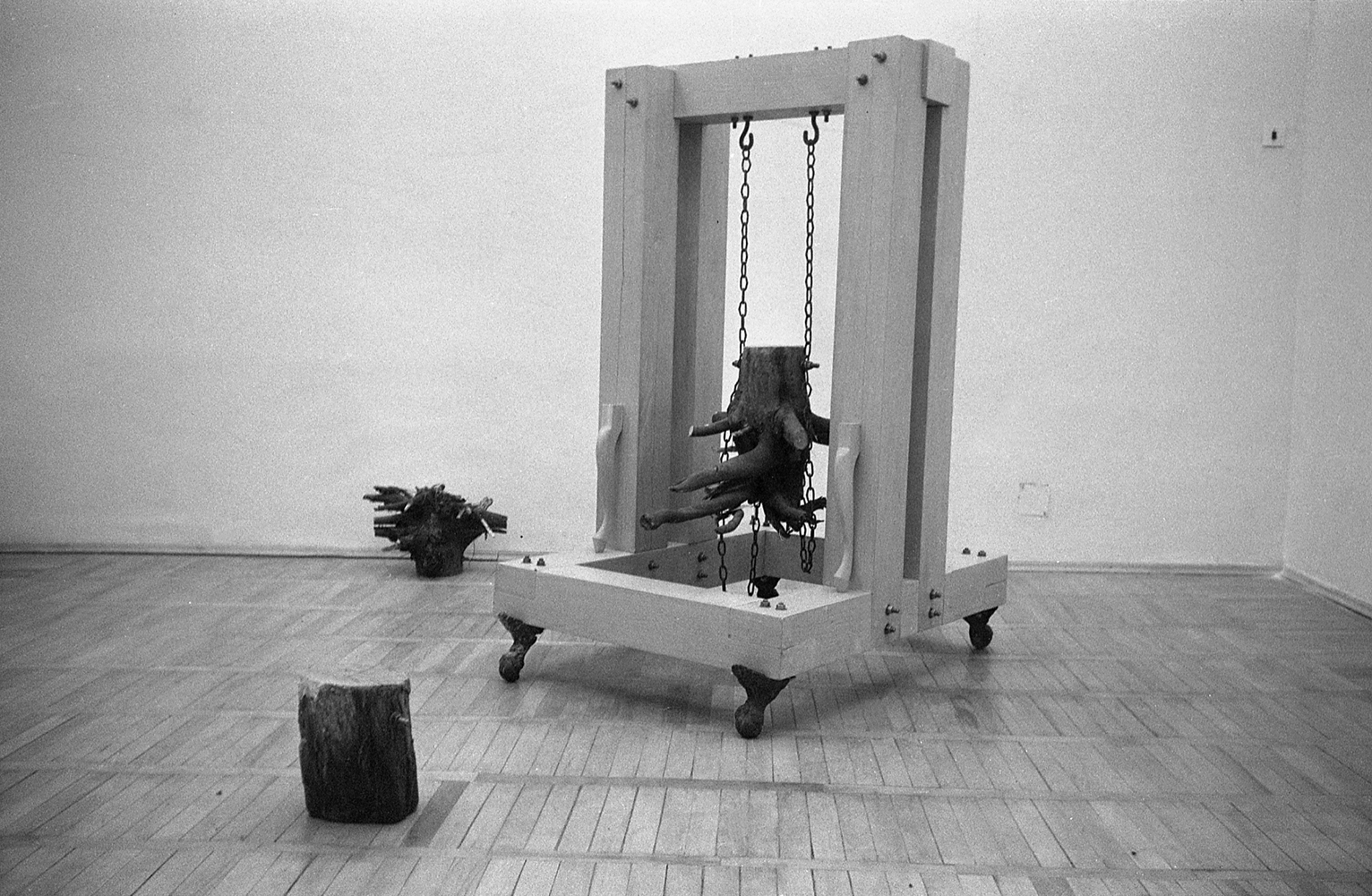
Swing for Stumps, 200 cm, installation, wooden constructions, stump, chain,1993

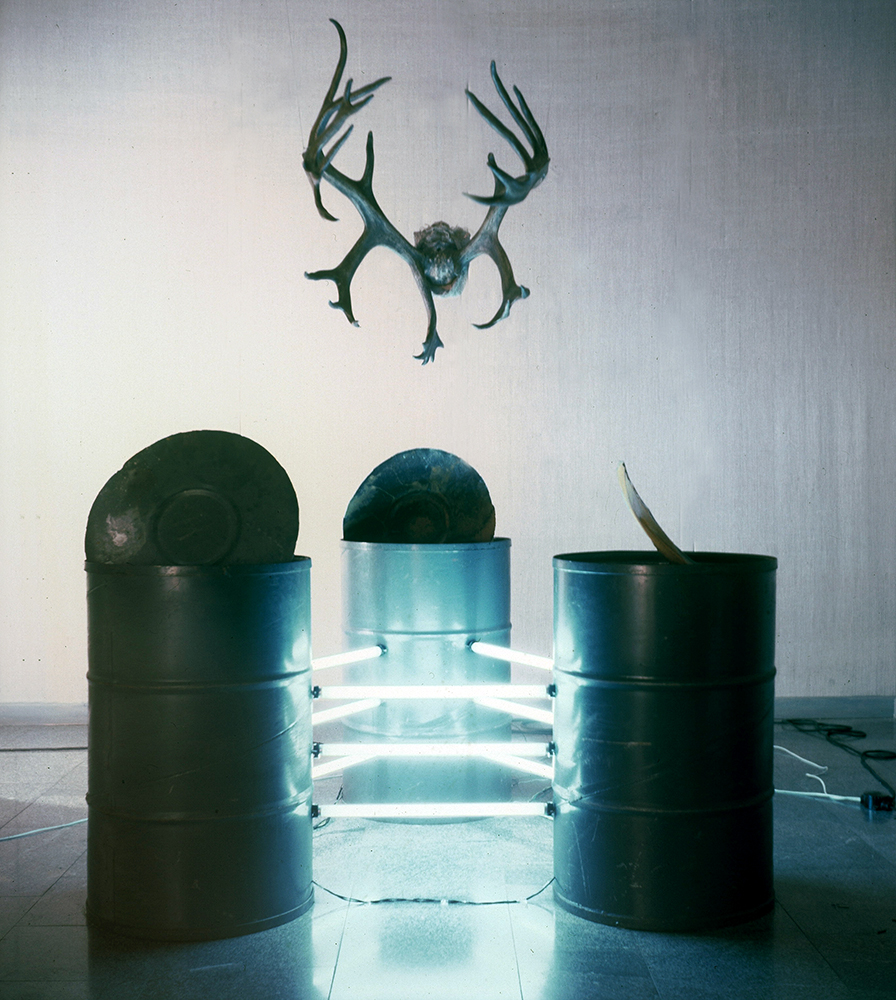
Big Bembi, installation, barrels, linear lamps, deer horns,1994

- 2022 | Unfolding Landscapes / Kunst(Zeug)Haus, Rapperswil-Jona, Switzerland
- 2022 | Unfolding Landscapes / Art & History Museum, Brussels, Belgium
- 2022 | Unfolding Landscapes / Art Centre Silkeborg Bad, Silkeborg, Denmark
- 2020 | Strange Time / Art Laboratory (online)
- 2017 | Outcasts Salon / Naval Museum, Odesa, Ukraine
- 2017 | Cold Faith / Invogue Gallery, Odesa, Ukraine
- 2016 | The Spirit of Tme / Zenko Art Foundation, Tatarov, Ukraine
- 2016 | Recipe for Utopia / Modern Art Research Institute, Kyiv, Ukraine
- 2016 | Dashing 90th / The Museum of Odesa Modern Art, Odesa, Ukraine
- 2016 | Ergo sum. Self-portraits exhibition / Dukat Gallery, Kyiv, Ukraine
- 2016 | Three Generations of Ukrainian artists in the Tatyana and Boris Grinev Collection / Yermilov Centre, Kharkov, Ukraine
- 2015 | Enfant Terrible. Odesa conceptualism / National Art Museum of Ukraine, Kyiv, Ukraine
- 2015 | Museum Collection. Ukrainian Contemporary Art 1985–2015 / Mystetskyi Arsenal, Kyiv, Ukraine
- 2014 | Ukrainian Landscape / Mystetskyi Arsenal, Kyiv, Ukraine
- 2013 | Odesa School. Tradition and Currency / Mystetskyi Arsenal, Kyiv, Ukraine
- 2012 | The Myth. Ukrainian Baroque / National Art Museum of Ukraine, Kyiv, Ukraine
- 2012 | Contemporary Ukrainian artists / Yermilov Centre, Kharkov, Ukraine
- 2011 | Independent / Mystetskyi Arsenal, Kyiv, Ukraine
- 2010 | TOP-10 Contemporary Artists of Odesa / Hudpromo Gallery, Odesa, Ukraine
- 2010 | Star Wars / Korobchinsky Art Centre, Odesa, Ukraine
- 2009 | Restart / Marine Art Terminal, Odesa, Ukraine
- 2009 | Ukrainian New Wave / National Art Museum of Ukraine, Kyiv, Ukraine
- 2008 | Odesa Contemporary Art / The Museum of Odesa Modern Art, Odesa, Ukraine
- 2008 | Exhibition dedicated to the 70th anniversary of National Artists Union of Ukraine / Central Artists House, Kyiv, Ukraine
- 2004 | Farewell to Arms / Mystetskyi Arsenal, Kyiv, Ukraine
- 2003 | First Collection / Central Artists House, Kyiv, Ukraine
- 2000 | Partial Eclipse / French Cultural Center, Belgrade, Yugoslavia
- 2000 | Positive Reaction / Odesa Museum of Western and Eastern Art, Odesa, Ukraine
- 1999 | Pinakothek / Ukrainian House, Kyiv, Ukraine
- 1998 | Month of Photography / Bratislava, Slovakia
- 1998 | Out-of-Graphics / Odesa Art Museum, Odesa, Ukraine
- 1998 | Coldness Academy / Odesa Art Museum, Odesa, Ukraine
- 1998 | Sides / Karas Gallery, Kyiv, Ukraine
- 1998 | Two Days and Two Nights / Contemporary Music Festival, Odesa, Ukraine
- 1998 | All-Ukrainian Youth Exhibition / Central Artists House, Kyiv, Ukraine
- 1997 | Photosynthesis / Exhibitions directorate of the National Artists Union of Ukraine, Kyiv, Ukraine
- 1996 | Phantom Opera / Young Spectator Theater, Odesa, Ukraine
- 1996 | Jam Look / Contemporary Art Center, Kyiv-Mohyla Academy, Kyiv, Ukraine
- 1996 | Golden section / Applicants Exhibition for the title "Best Artist of 1996", Ukrainian House, Kyiv, Ukraine
- 1996 | Commodity Fetishism / Ukrainian House, Kyiv, Ukraine
- 1996 | Naked Dream / Blanc Art Gallery, Kyiv, Ukraine
- 1996 | Family Album / Contemporary Art Center, Kyiv-Mohyla Academy, Kyiv, Ukraine
- 1996 | Synthetic Art Advertising / Karas Gallery, Kyiv, Ukraine
- 1996 | Batiscaf – 1 / International Symposium / Sailors Palace, Odesa, Ukraine
- 1996 | ART Festival Participant / Odesa Museum of Western and Eastern Art, Odesa, Ukraine
- 1996 | Two Days and Two Nights / Contemporary Music Festival, Odesa, Ukraine
- 1995 | Dr. Frankenstein's Study / Scientists House, Odesa, Ukraine
- 1995 | Blood Test / Exhibitions directorate of the National Artists Union of Ukraine, Kyiv, Ukraine
- 1995 | Kandinsky Syndrome / Local History Museum, Odesa, Ukraine
- 1995 | Two Days and Two Nights / Tirs Contemporary Art Center, Odesa, Ukraine
- 1994 | Free Zone / Odesa Art Museum, Odesa, Ukraine
- 1994 | Cultural Revolution Space / Ukrainian House, Kyiv, Ukraine
- 1994 | Terrible – amorous / Tirs Contemporary Art Center, Odesa, Ukraine
- 1994 | Traditions Continuation / Odesa Art Museum, Odesa, Ukraine
- 1994 | Lux ex tenebris / Tirs Contemporary Art Center, Odesa, Ukraine
- 1993 | Grafik aus Odesa / Municipal Gallery, Rosenheim, Germany
- 1993 | Random Exhibition / Tirs Contemporary Art Center, Odesa, Ukraine
- 1993 | Steppes of Europe / Ujazdowski Castle, Warsaw, Poland
- 1993 | Diaspora / Central Artists House, Moscow, Russia
- 1991 | Kunst aus Odesa / Galerie im Alten Rathaus, Prien am Chiemsee, Germany
- 1991 | The Glory and Modernity of Odesa / Yokohama, Japan
- 1991 | Ukrainian Pictorial Art of the ХХ century / National Art Museum of Ukraine, Kyiv, USSR
- 1990 | Babylon / Central Youth Palace, Moscow, USSR
- 1990 | After Modernism – 2 / Odesa Art Museum, Odesa, USSR
- 1990 | Avec Cézanne, avec Van Gogh pour la montagne Sant Victore... / Marseille, France
- 1990 | Soviart. Three generations of Ukrainian pictorial art of the 60-80s / Odense, Denmark
- 1990 | Soviart. Three generations of Ukrainian pictorial art of the 60-80s / Commerce and Industry Chamber, Kyiv, USSR
- 1989 | After Modernism / Odesa Art Museum, Odesa, USSR
- 1989 | New Figurations / Literary Museum, Odesa, USSR
- 1988 | All-Union Young Artists Exhibition / Manezh, Moscow, USSR
- 1973 – 1989 | participant of regional, republican, all-Union, foreign exhibitions

== Collections ==
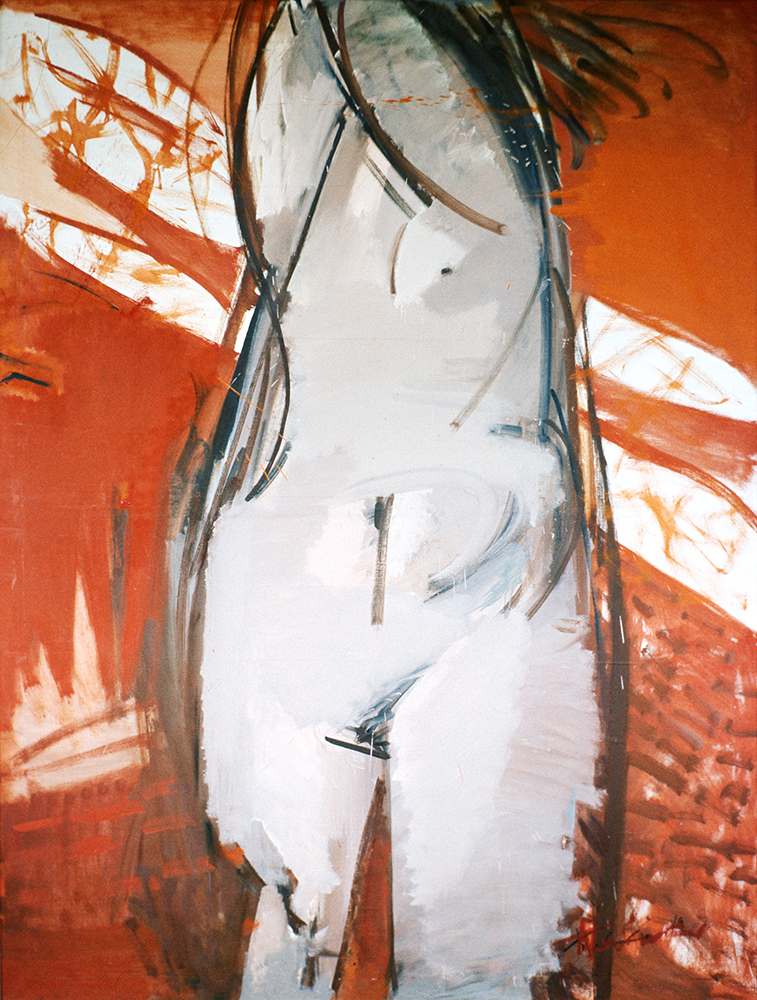
Daphne, 200 x 150 cm, oil on canvas,1989 (Odessa Art Museum Collection)

- Zimmerli Art Museum at Rutgers University (New Jersey, United States)
- Udmurt Republican Fine Arts Museum (Izhevsk, Russia)
- National Art Museum of Ukraine (Kyiv, Ukraine)
- Museum of Modern Art of Ukraine(Kyiv, Ukraine)
- Soviart Contemporary art Centre (Kyiv, Ukraine)
- Odesa Fine Arts Museum (Odesa, Ukraine)
- The Museum of Odesa Modern Art (Odesa, Ukraine)
- Nikanor Onatsky Regional Art Museum (Sumy, Ukraine)
- Chernihiv Regional Art Museum (Chernihiv, Ukraine)
- Ministry of Culture of Ukraine (Kyiv, Ukraine)
- Exhibitions directorate of the National Artists Union of Ukraine (Kyiv, Ukraine)
- Zaporizhzhia Regional Art Museum (Zaporizhzhia, Ukraine)
- Cherkasy Regional Art Museum (Cherkasy, Ukraine)
- The Korsaks’ Museum of Contemporary Ukrainian (Lutsk, Ukraine)

== Bibliography ==
- Steffy Antony, "Interpretation of Emotions Through Colors and Patterns used in "Red Room I" by Vasiliy Ryabchenko" / International Journal of Innovative Technology and Exploring Engineering (IJITEE) / ISSN: 2278-3075, Volume-8, Issue-7C2, May 2019
- Museum collection "Ukrainian Contemporary Art 1985–2015 from private collections" / Art Arsenal – Kyiv, 2015. – p. 52 – 53
- Contemporary ukrainian artist. – Rodovid, 2012. – p. 136 – 143
- Myth. Ukrainian Baroque / National Art Museum of Ukraine. – Kyiv, 2012. – p. 39, 161
- All-Ukrainian Triennial of Painting, Kyiv – 2010 / National Union of Artists of Ukraine. – 2010. – p. 37
- Ukrainian New Wave / National Art Museum of Ukraine. — Kyiv, 2009. — p. 164 – 171
- Visual art. From avant-garde shifts to the newest directions. The development of visual art of Ukraine of the XX-XXI century. — Modern Art Research Institute – Kyiv, 2008. — p. 119
- Modern art of the times of independence of Ukraine: 100 names. – Mysl. – 2008. – p. 536–539, p. 640
- Odesa Regional Organization of the National Union of Artists of Ukraine. – Grafikplus, 2006. – p. 117
- Farewell to arms / Art Arsenal. — Kyiv, 2004. — p. 67, 121
- Portfolio. The art of Odesa in the 1990s. Collection of texts / Soros Center for Contemporary Art-Odesa. – Odesa, 1999. – p. 13, 15, 22, 24–26, 36, 52–53, 60–65, 164–167, 294–301, 312
- Ukrainian art of the 1960s – 1980s. – Soviart. – Mammens Bogtrykkeri A / S. – p. 9 – 20. p. 88 – 89
