= Andrii Sahaidakovskyi =

Ukrainian painter

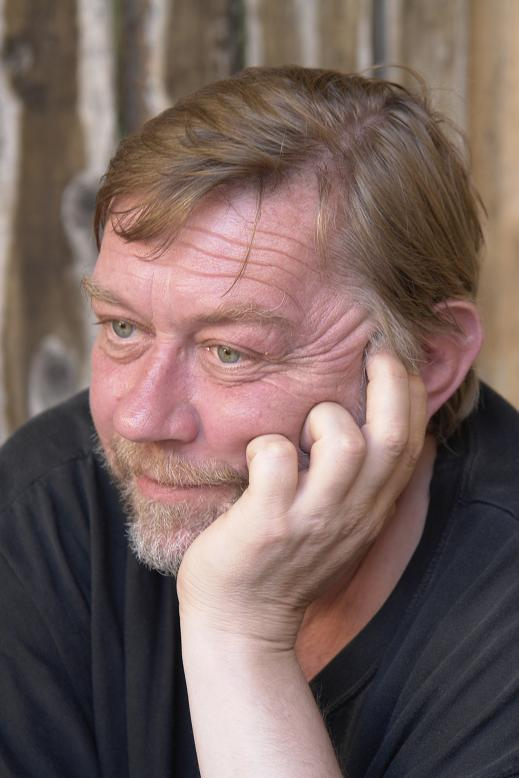
Andrii Sahaidakovskyi

Andriy Valerianovych Sagaidakovsky (born April 17, 1957, in Lviv) is a Ukrainian artist, participant of the Ukrainian New Wave. He works in the field of painting and practices unusual techniques, such as painting on rugs. Andriy is one of the most ironic contemporary Ukrainian artists, who finds unusual perspectives on everyday topics.

== Solo exhibitions ==
- 1992 - Warsaw, "Laboratoriya" Gallery.
- 1997 - Lviv, "Dzyga" Art Center.
- 1999 - Kyiv, "Yavna tayemnytsya." Center for Contemporary Art.
- 2001 - Lviv, Museum of the History of Religion.
- 2006 - Lublin, "Terytoriyi."
- 18.09.2020 - 24.01.2021 - Kyiv, Art Arsenal, "Andrii Sahaidakovskyi. Scenery. Welcome!"

== See also ==
- Mystetskyi Arsenal National Art and Culture Museum Complex

== Sources ==
- Сусак В. Андрій Сагайдаковський // Реанімація. Проект. Альбом Львівської галереї мистецтв. — Львів : Львівська галерея мистецтв, 2007. — С. 46.
- Скляренко Г. Про складність простих речей: Андрій Сагайдаковський // Сучасне мистецтво України. Портрети художників. — Київ : ArtHuss, 2016. — С. 213–228. — ISBN 978-617-7110-17-9.
