= Ukrainian New Wave =

Movement in Ukrainian arts

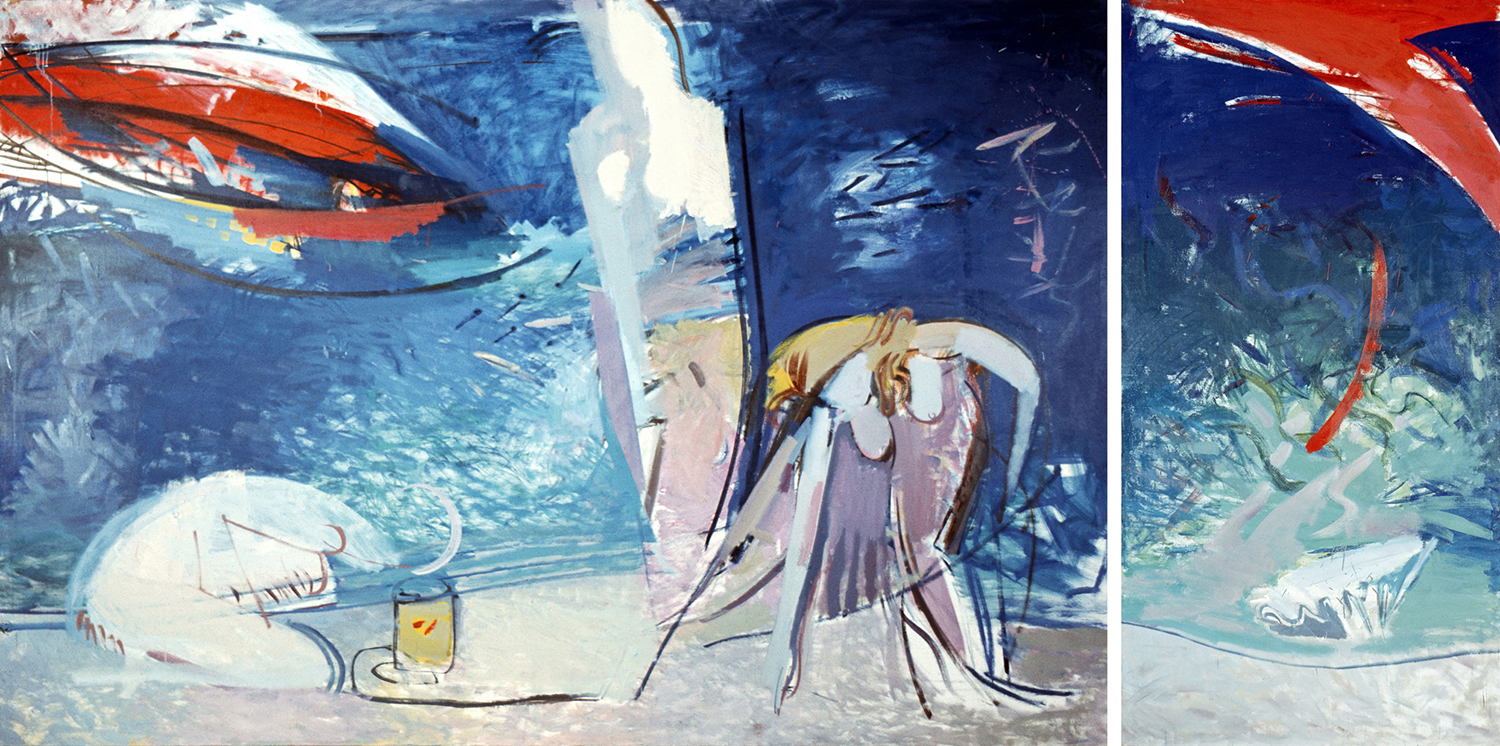
Vasiliy Ryabchenko. "Undecipherable characters shore", 200 х 400 cm, canvas, oil, 1989.

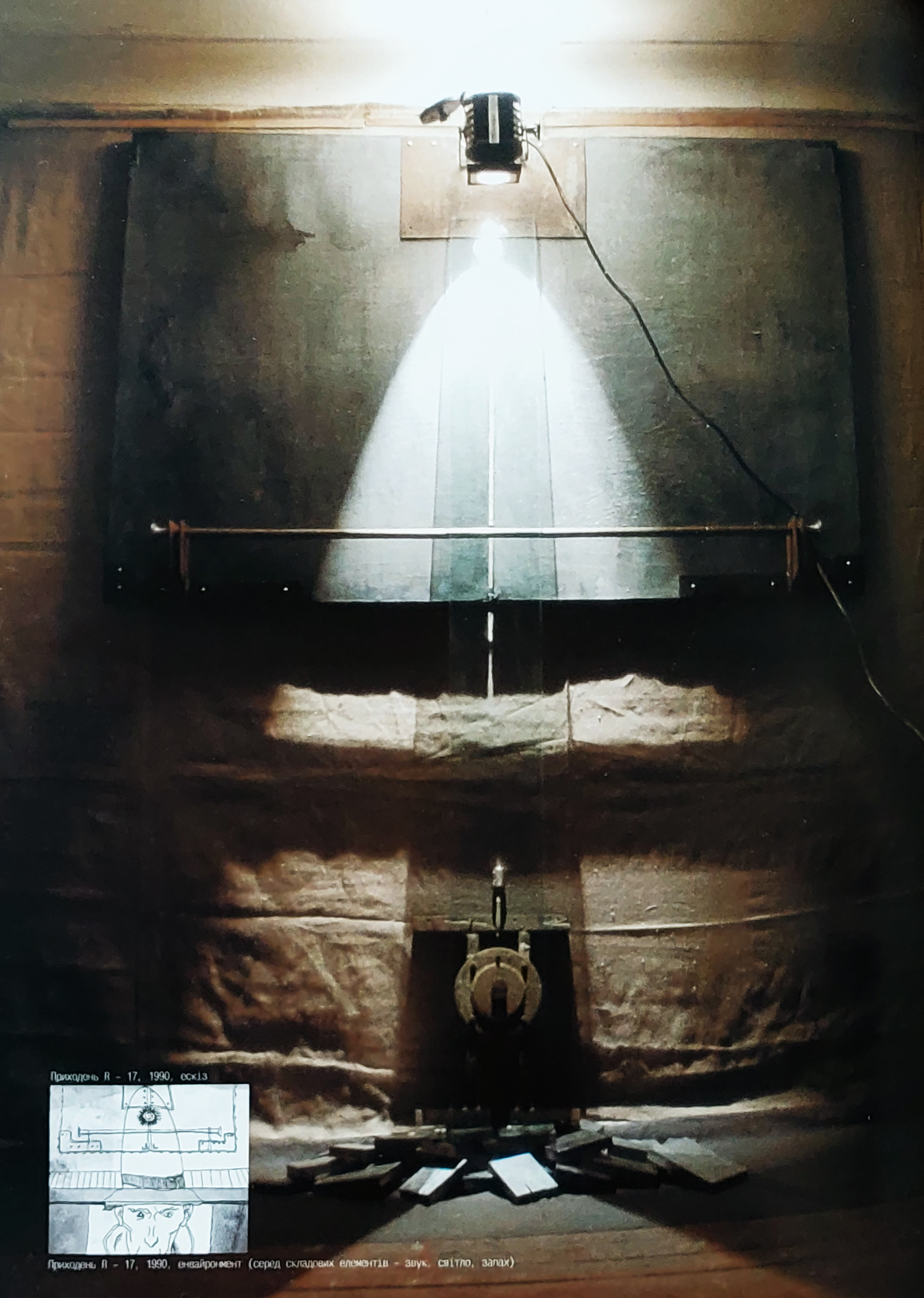
Art object by Glib Viches R-17. 1990

Ukrainian New Wave (Ukrainian: Нова українська хвиля, romanized: Nova ukrainska khvylia) is a set of creative directions that arose in Ukraine in the period from the late 1980s to the early 2000s in reaction to turbulent socio-political events of that time such as collapse of the USSR, perestroika, Declaration of Independence of Ukraine. It is one of the most influential manifestation of Ukrainian postmodernism, which is characterized by a variety of works and groups of both destructive and constructive nature, aimed at both strengthening the features of fine arts and moving away from it towards actionism and replacing traditional art with the latest technologies. Ukrainian New Wave originated in the previous period Ukrainian underground art, which arose spontaneously, without censorship and ideological restrictions.

In international art, the term "New Wave" is referring to the period of creative renewal that unites a wide range of movements of the late 1970s and 1980s, associated with the manifestations of postmodernism in design, architecture, cinematography, music and literature. In Ukraine, the New Wave was prominent mainly in the visual (fine arts) and not in music and cinema, like French New Wave or New Wave of British heavy metal. However, the features of the Ukrainian New Wave were still occasionally manifested in cinema, theater, literature and music of Ukraine.

Works by the main group of artists were presented at the National Art Museum of Ukraine in 2009 at the exhibition "Ukrainian New Wave".

== Beginning and development ==
The basis for the movement was a new generation of artists (born in the 1960s) who were just beginning their careers and were no longer under pressure from the authorities, which coincided with the liberalization of the "perestroika" era and the reduction of the collective's influence on the individual. The influence of postmodernism was clearly seen in the art of the young generation of artists from many cities of Ukraine. They sought inspiration in the samples of the classical avant-garde, neo-avant-garde, western modernism, Italian transavantgarde, postmodernism, neoclassicism, folk art, and others.

As an all-Ukrainian movement, the phenomenon was formed after a series of youth exhibitions in 1987-1988 in Kyiv and Kharkiv and the Sedniv-88 and Sedniv-89 plein airs. Among the institutions that for the first time supported young artists at the national level was Soviart, the youth sections of the Union of Artists of Kyiv and Kharkiv. The catalogs of Soviart's exhibitions - "View 21" (1989) and "Ukrainian Painting" (1990) are the primary sources that cover the beginning of the movement. The unity of artists in a more local dimension was promoted by the organizations "TOH", "Center of Europe", "Three Points", "Panorama", Biennale "Impreza" and "Renaissance". Among the main exhibitions in which the artists of the New Wave took part were the Youth Exhibitions (Moscow and Kyiv, 1987–1989), the exhibitions of Soviart, and others.

In 1990 Marat Gelman opened his private contemporary art gallery in Moscow. He put together a collection of Ukrainian and Russian art, which became the core of South Russian Wave exhibition, shown in 1992. Later, Ukrainian artists of the "South Wave" began to exhibit independently under the name "Ukrainian New Wave". From 2002 to 2004, there was a local branch of Guelman Gallery in Kiyv managed by Oleksandr Rojtburd where presented Ukrainian New Wave artists Arsen Savadov, Oleg Golosiy, Valerya Trubina and other.

The artists of the "New Wave" did not have a single worldview or many common features in their works. Signs of movement were creative freedom, independence of the person from collective that gave birth to novelty, experiments, impartiality. The artists of the "wave" were very different, and because of this by the 1990s the movement was already divided into several groups according to aesthetic preferences.

The movement also included: "Ukrainian transavantgarde" (transavantgarde paintings, mostly artists from Kyiv and Odesa); "Western Ukrainian Postmodernism" by artists in Lviv and Ivano-Frankivsk, who were mainly engaged in installations and actionism; "Kyiv Postmodernism", whose artists created numerous installations. The theoretical basis for them were the main ideas of the Italian transavantgarde theorist Achilles Bonito Oliva.

Other artists of this generation chose individual creative paths, close to modernist and traditional trends of that time but in the interpretation of a new period of time: neo-expressionism, fantastic realism, impressionism, post-impressionism, photorealism, hyperrealism and others, which in general were called "polystylism".

== Participants of Ukrainian New Wave exhibitions ==
More than five hundred artists took part in the Ukrainian New Wave. Among them are Mykola Babak, Illya Chichkan, Oleksandr Hnylytskyi, Olena Golub, Pavlo Kerestey, Vlad Khart, Yuri Kosin, Les Podervianskyi, Ihor Podolchak, Oleksandr Rojtburd, Oleg Holosiy, Vasiliy Ryabchenko, Arsen Savadov, Andrii Sahaidakovskyi, Sergei Sviatchenko, Marina Skugareva, Fedir Tetianych, Oleg Tistol, Glib Viches, Nicholas Zalevsky, Alexander Zhyvotkov and other.

== Sources ==
- in ukr.: Glib Viches. Album//The Kyiv City State Administration Main Department of Culture, Arts and Protection of Cultural Heritage. 2004
