= Oleksandr Zhyvotkov =

Ukrainian artist (born 1964)

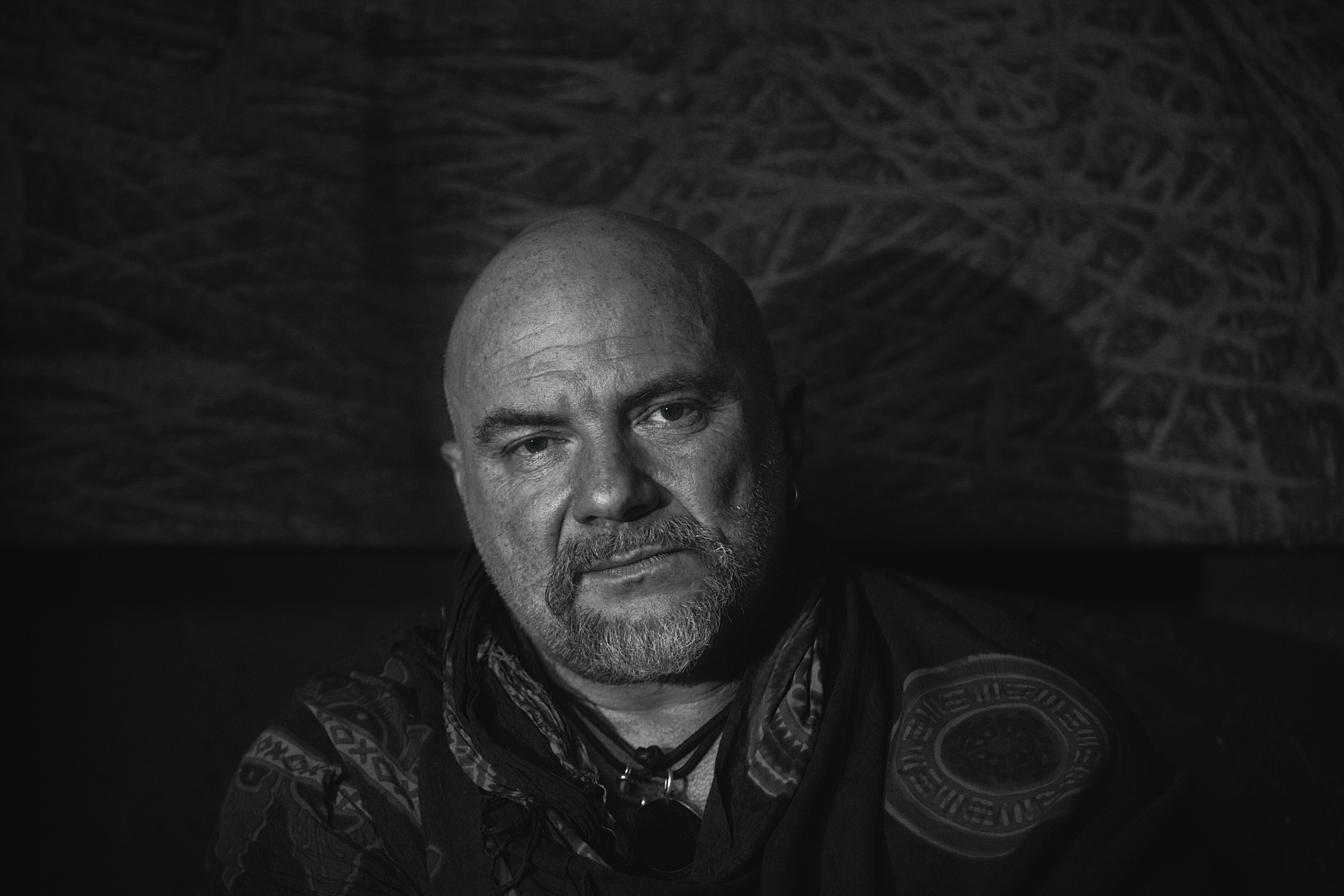
- Born: Oleksandr Olehovych Zhyvotkov; 31 March 1964 (age 62); Kyiv, Ukraine
- Education: National Academy of Visual Arts and Architecture
- Known for: Painting, Wood, Mixed media

Oleksandr Olehovych Zhyvotkov (Ukrainian: Олександр Олегович Животков; born 1964) is a Ukrainian artist who lives and works in Kyiv, the capital of Ukraine. He studied at the Taras Shevchenko Republican Art School from 1975 to 1982. Zhyvotkov graduated from National Academy of Visual Arts and Architecture (1982—1988, Kyiv, Ukraine). Since 1992 Oleksandr Zhyvotkov is a member of the art group Picturesque sanctuary; participant of the Ukrainian New Wave.

== Biography ==
Oleksandr Zhyvotkov was born on 31 March 1964 in Kyiv in a creative family that lived on the then Heroes of the Revolution Street (now - Tryokhsviatytelska), near St. Michael's Golden-Domed Monastery. He lives and works in his hometown - the Ukrainian capital. He began to receive the basics of art education before entering the Taras Shevchenko Republican Art School in 1975 (graduated in 1982) - in the family (he is a fifth-generation artist), where his father and older brother are artists, as well as in the environment. According to Oleksandr Zhyvotkov, his creative mentor and teacher was his uncle - artist Mikhail Rudakov (Moscow, Russia). He graduated in 1988 and received a diploma of higher education at the Faculty of Scenography of the Kyiv State Art Institute) during perestroika. His teacher was Oleksii Bobrovnikov.

== Collections ==
- Ministry of Culture of Ukraine
- Directorate of the National Union of Artists of Ukraine
- the National Museum 'Kyiv Picture Gallery' (former Museum of Russian Art)
- National Art Museum of Ukraine
- Sumy Art Museum (Ukraine)
- Khmelnitsky Art Museum (Ukraine)
- Ministry of Culture of Russia
- Kunsthistorisches Museum (Austria).

Oleksandr Zhyvotkov’s works are kept at museums and in numerous private collections in Europe, America, Asia and Africa. His paintings are sold at world auctions such as Sotheby's, Phillips.

== Publications ==
- Oleksandr Zhyvotkov. 'Live. Motherboard', Stedley Art Foundation, 2016.
- Oleksandr Zhyvotkov. 'Live. Дороги 2014—2015', Stedley Art Foundation, 2015.
- Oleksandr Zhyvotkov. 'Кyiv 2014', Stedley Art Foundation, 2015.
- Oleksandr Zhyvotkov. Canvas, wood, cardboard. Work with materials.1984—2014', Stedley Art Foundation, 2014.
