= Oleg Holosiy =

Ukrainian painter of the New Ukrainian Wave

- Олег Голосій
- Born: Oleg Mykolayovych Holosiy; 31 May 1965; Dnipropetrovsk, Ukrainian SSR, Soviet Union
- Died: 18 January 1993 (aged 27); Kyiv, Ukraine
- Education: Dnipropetrovsk Art College; Kyiv State Art Institute
- Known for: Painting
- Notable work: Psychedelic Attack of Blue Rabbits
- Movement: New Ukrainian Wave; contemporary art

Oleg Mykolayovych Holosiy (31 May 1965 – 18 January 1993) was a Ukrainian painter and one of the key representatives of the New Wave of Ukrainian art that formed in the last Soviet years and the first years of independence. He became associated with the Kyiv “Paris Commune” squat. He is regarded as a significant figure in the history of Ukrainian contemporary art.

== Biography ==
Holosiy was born in 1965 in Dnipropetrovsk (now Dnipro). He studied at the Yevhen Vuchetych Dnipro Art School in the workshop of Leonid Antonyuk, graduating in 1984. He later continued his education at the Kyiv State Art Institute, in the Department of Monumental Painting, graduating in 1990.

After moving to Kyiv, Holosiy joined the community of artists around the “Paris Commune” group, where he worked alongside Valeriia Trubina, Oleksandr Hnylytskyi, Yurii Solomko, Nataliia Filonenko and others. In the late 1980s and early 1990s he took part in a number of important exhibitions of the time, including Silence (Shtyl) in Kyiv in 1992 and Postanesthesia in Munich in 1992. By the early 1990s he had become a notable figure of the Ukrainian New Wave and exerted a substantial influence on other artists in Ukraine and abroad.

Holosiy’s work is often described as expressive, drawing on literature, cinema, religion and reflections on life and death. During his life he collaborated with the Moscow gallery “Regina” and exhibited both in Ukraine and internationally.

Holosiy died in Kyiv in 1993 at the age of 27.

== Work ==
Over approximately the last five years of his life Holosiy created more than 270 paintings, along with numerous graphic works, which have been described as benchmarks of a distinctive artistic identity seeking alternatives to Soviet academicism and engaging with international postmodernist tendencies such as the Italian Transavantgarde. His monumental painting Psychedelic Attack of Blue Rabbits was acquired for the collection of the Kelvingrove Art Gallery and Museum in Glasgow, Scotland.

His works are held in private collections and institutions in Ukraine and abroad, and he is frequently cited as a key figure of the Ukrainian New Wave and the Parcommune (Paris Commune) circle.

== Artist’s estate ==
In 2019, the artist’s brother and heir, Denys Holosiy, together with The Naked Room gallery in Kyiv, founded the Artist Estate of Oleg Holosiy. The estate aims to preserve and study the artist’s works and archive, systematize information about him, disseminate knowledge about his practice, stimulate scholarly research and prepare a catalogue raisonné. Another goal of the estate is to ensure the presence of Holosiy’s works in public museum collections in Ukraine and abroad.

To mark the foundation of the estate, The Naked Room organised the exhibition A Boy and a Comet (The Boy and the Comet) in 2019 and published a catalogue including paintings from the family collection together with drawings, sketches, notebook pages and documents.

== Exhibitions ==
In 2019, the Mystetskyi Arsenal National Art and Culture Museum Complex in Kyiv presented the large retrospective research exhibition Oleg Holosiy. Non-stop Painting. The exhibition brought together more than 70 paintings, about 50 graphic artworks and extensive archival material from around 20 museum and private collections, as well as from the artist’s estate. It formed part of a series of projects dedicated to Holosiy’s work in the context of contemporary Ukrainian art, alongside exhibitions at The Naked Room and the National Art Museum of Ukraine.

Holosiy’s work has been included in later thematic projects on Ukrainian art of the late twentieth century, such as exhibitions on the Ukrainian New Wave and the Parcommune community.
