= Oleksandr Rojtburd =

Ukrainian artist and painter (1961–2021)

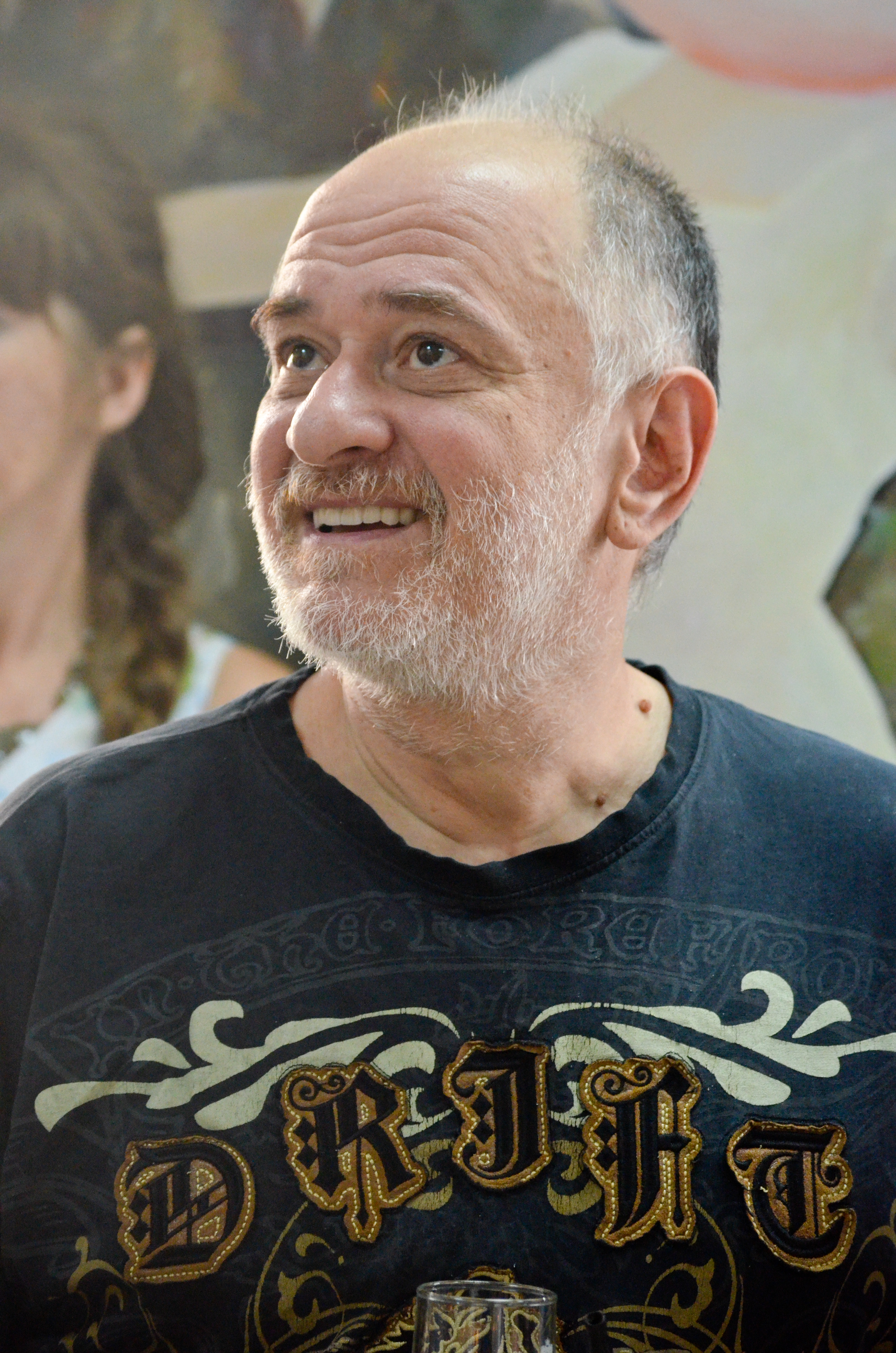
- Rojtburd in 2014
- Born: Олександр Анатолійович Ройтбурд; 14 October 1961; Odesa, Ukrainian SSR, Soviet Union
- Died: 8 August 2021 (aged 59); Kyiv, Ukraine

Oleksandr Rojtburd (Ukrainian: Олександр Анатолійович Ройтбурд; 14 October 1961, Odesa, USSR – 8 August 2021, Kyiv, Ukraine) was a participant of the Ukrainian New Wave and co-founder of the theory of the Ukrainian Transavantgard. He worked as a painter and installation artist, among other things with video and photo projects. He belongs to the first wave of post-independence, post-Soviet, and post-traditional Ukrainian artists.

== Biography ==
Olexander Rojtburd was born in Odesa in 1961. He graduated from the art and graphic faculty of the Odesa Pedagogical Institute in 1983. With a strong presence at the Ukrainian cultural landscape, he was an Odesa-born, Ukrainian-Jewish contemporary artist.

In the early 1990s, the USSR as the social framework that subtended Soviet-Ukrainian art fell apart. Though one cannot reduce Soviet art to socialist realism or classical-style painting, the post-modernity of Ukrainian contemporary art has formed in contrast to the former phenomenon. In this respect, Rojtburd's painting was post-modern in this sense.

He co-founded the New Art Association in Odesa in 1993. From 1993 he worked as its art director and from 1999 to 2001 as president.

He worked as the director of the Marat Gelman Gallery in Kyiv.

Rojtburd had personal exhibitions in Ukraine, the US, and the Russian Federation. He was also a member of the Council for the Development of the National Cultural, Artistic and Museum Complex "Art Arsenal" in Ukraine.

At the Kyiv Book Arsenal 2016, a room with large-format provocative works was dedicated to his work. From March 2018 to 8 August 2021 he was the director of the Odesa Art Museum.

He died from cancer in Kyiv on 8 August 2021.

Aside from ironic, highly stylized, self-consciously painterly artistic works, his legacy includes the results of his local museum director activities. Further into the past, he exhibited a rhetorical involvement via Facebook commentaries and demonstration participation in the events of 2013–2014 in Ukraine's capital.

== Work ==
Oleksandr Rojtburd is considered to be one of the important phenomena of the Ukrainian New Wave movement. At first sight, his works are mostly mythologically determined and pervaded by archetypal representations. Yet the elements of the surreal remain within the organic limits of a subtle evolution. As a painter, he never compromised on developing and defining his personal style through a transformation in search of the Greek model. His latest works are characterized by the rejection of sarcasm and drama. The conflict disappears from the scene in favor of subtle irony and intimacy.

== Exhibitions ==
=== Solo ===
- 2003: The Retrospective, Bereznitsky Gallery (L-art Gallery), Ludmila Beresnitsky, Kyiv, Ukraine
- 2001: One-Man-Show Crucified Buddha, curator Kostyantyn Doroshenko, Museum of Cultural Heritage, Kyiv, Ukraine
- 1997: The Every Day Life in Pompeii, Atelier Karas Gallery, Kyiv, Ukraine

=== Group exhibitions ===
- 2002: Arts and Drugs, Rebellminds Gallery, Berlin
- 2001: Plateau of Mankind, 49th Venice Biennale, Venice, Italy
- 2000: Video Time, MOMA, New York, USA

== Literature ==
- 2016: Roitburd, Osnovy, Kyiv
- 2004: From RED to yellow and blue, Ludmila Beresnitsky, Kyiv
- 2003: Perscha Konnektija, Kyiv
