= Sergei Sviatchenko =

Ukrainian artist (born 1952)

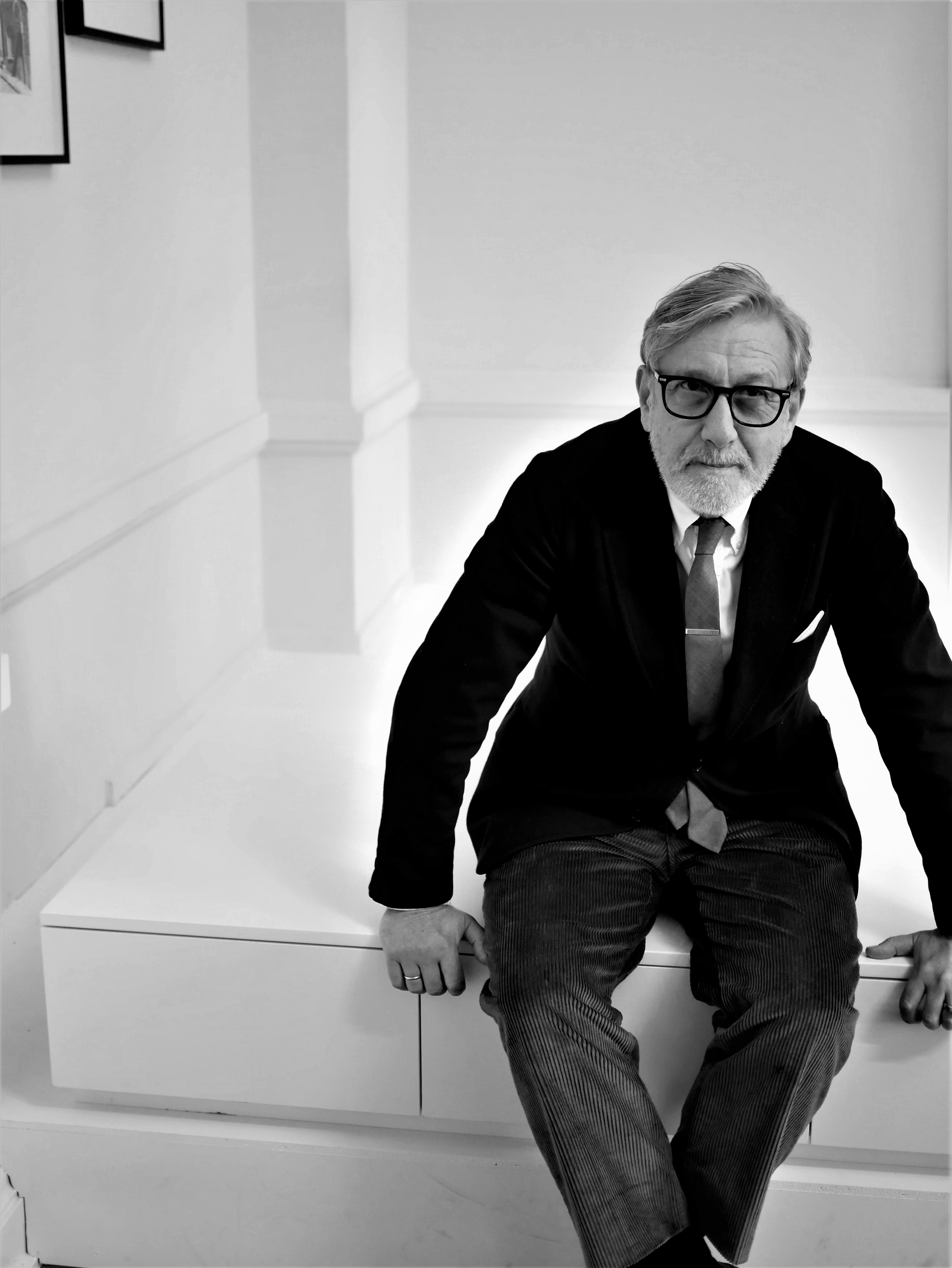
- Sergei Sviatchenko
- Born: 1952 (age 73–74); Ukraine
- Education: Kharkiv National University of Construction and Architecture; Kyiv University of Construction and Architecture, Ph.D.
- Occupations: Visual artist of Conceptuel Art, Collage, Painting
- Honors: Honorary Member and Professor of the Ukrainian Academy of Architecture; Foreign academician of the National Academy of Arts of Ukraine, 2023
- Website: sviatchenko.dk

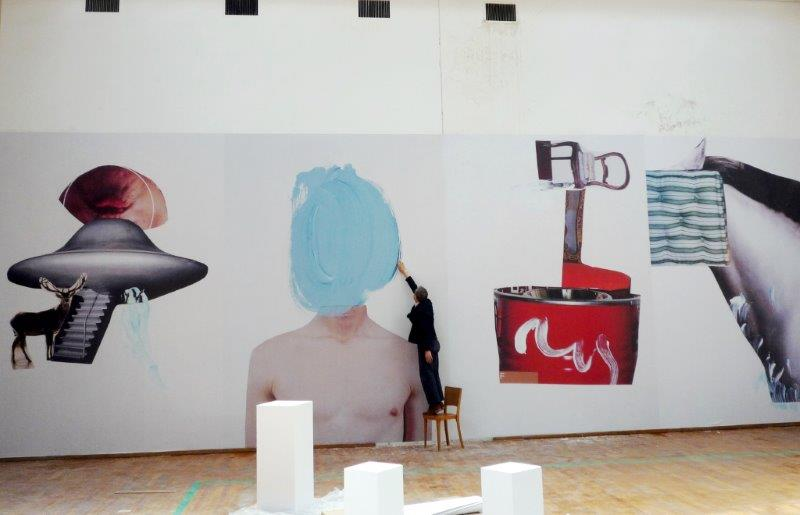
Work on display at the Museum of Contemporary Art in Belgrade

Sergei Sviatchenko (born 1952) is a Danish-Ukrainian architect, artist, photographer and curator. He is a representative of the Ukrainian New Wave, that arose in Ukraine up through the 1980s. Initiator and creative director of the Less Festival of Collage, Viborg and Just A Few Works. He has lived in Denmark since the 1990s.

Sviatchenko graduated from the Kharkiv National University of Construction and Architecture in 1975, and in 1986 he obtained a Ph.D. at the National Academy of Visual Arts and Architecture. Sviatchenko is the son of architect Evgenij Sviatchenko (1924–2004), who was a professor of architecture and a member of the National Ukrainian Academy of Fine Arts and Architecture, and engineer Ninel Sviatchenko (1926–2000). In 1975 Sergei Sviatchenko completed his architectural studies at the Kharkiv National University of Construction and Architecture. Sergei Sviatchenko is especially oriented towards architecture's modern expressions, including Constructivism and the contemporary European Bauhaus movement. From his teacher, Professor Viktor Antonov, Sviatchenko was introduced to the film director Andrei Tarkovsky, and particularly his film Mirror from 1975 has left a thematic footprint in Sviatchenko's more recent collage art. After having worked as an architect for a number of architectural firms in Kharkiv until 1983, Sviatchenko moved to Kyiv, where he graduated the master's program at the Kyiv National University of Construction and Architecture, having completed his Ph.D. dissertation "Means to Visual Information in Architecture".

In the 1980s he was one of the founders of the Soviart Center for Contemporary Art (Soviart) in Kyiv and co-organizer and curator of the first Ukrainian exhibitions of contemporary art "Kyiv-Tallinn" at the Igor Sikorsky Kyiv Polytechnic Institute (1987), "Kyiv-Kaunas" (1988), the first joint exhibition by Soviet and American artists (1988) and curated the first Ukrainian exhibitions in Denmark: "21 perceptions. Young Contemporary Ukrainian Artists" (1989), "Ukrainian Art 1960–80" (1990), "7 + 7" which was the first joint exhibition by Soviet and Danish artists (1990) and "Flash. A New Generation of Ukrainian Art" (1990).

At the end of 1990 Sviatchenko moved to Denmark with his wife Helena Sviatchenko having been awarded an art scholarship. In the same year he began to participate in solo and group exhibitions.

== Career ==
From 1975 to 1983, Sviatchenko worked as an architect for a number of architectural firms in Kharkiv. From 1983 to 1986, he studied and graduated with a master's degree from the Kyiv National University of Construction and Architecture, having completed his Ph.D. dissertation "Means to Visual Information in Architecture". In 1986 Sviatchenko was invited to work as art editor for the youth magazine "Ranok" ("Morning") in Kyiv. At the same time he became one of the founders of the Soviet Union's first center for contemporary art "Soviart" in Kyiv and the center's first art director and curator. In the latter half of the 1980s emerged "the Ukrainian New Wave" – a movement in Ukrainian visual art whose members rejected the restrictions of censorship, created new aesthetic principles with their creativity and insisted on the right to their own choice of artistic method. Sergei Sviatchenko was one of the participants in this perestroika-created movement in Kyiv. Sviatchenko has made a number of monumental art works, among others in Nokia's headquarters in Copenhagen (now Aalborg University Copenhagen), at the educational institution Tradium in Randers, in Jyske Bank's headquarters in Silkeborg, Holstebro Sygehus (hospital), Skjern kirke (church), Poul Due Jensen Academy (Grundfos), at Nykredit and Kraftvarmeværket (CHP plant), Viborg, Denmark, FC Midtjylland (Dream99) and ArtCenter Silkeborg Bad (sculpture park).

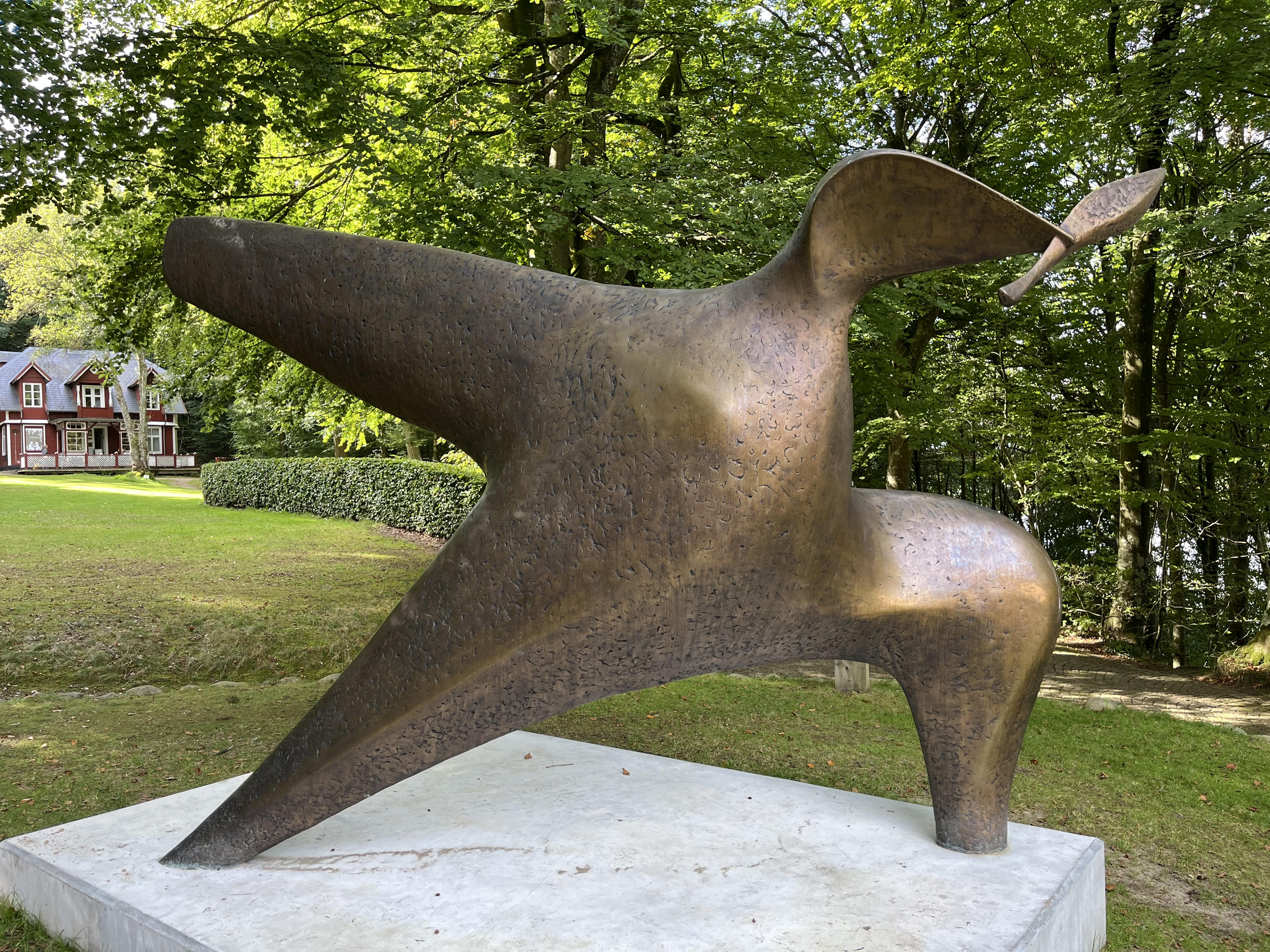
HOPE. Bronze-sculpture by Sergei Sviatchenko and Egor Zigura

He is a member of the Billedkunstnernes Forbund (BKF) (Union of Visual Artists) and the National Union of Architects of Ukraine. In 2007 Sergei Sviatchenko was awarded the International Yellow Pencil Award/London,(D&AD). Honorary Member and Professor of the Ukrainian Academy of Architecture, 2022. Foreign academician of the National Academy of Arts of Ukraine, 2023. IPA2023 Honorable Mentioned in the category Fine Art Collage.

== Senko Studios ==
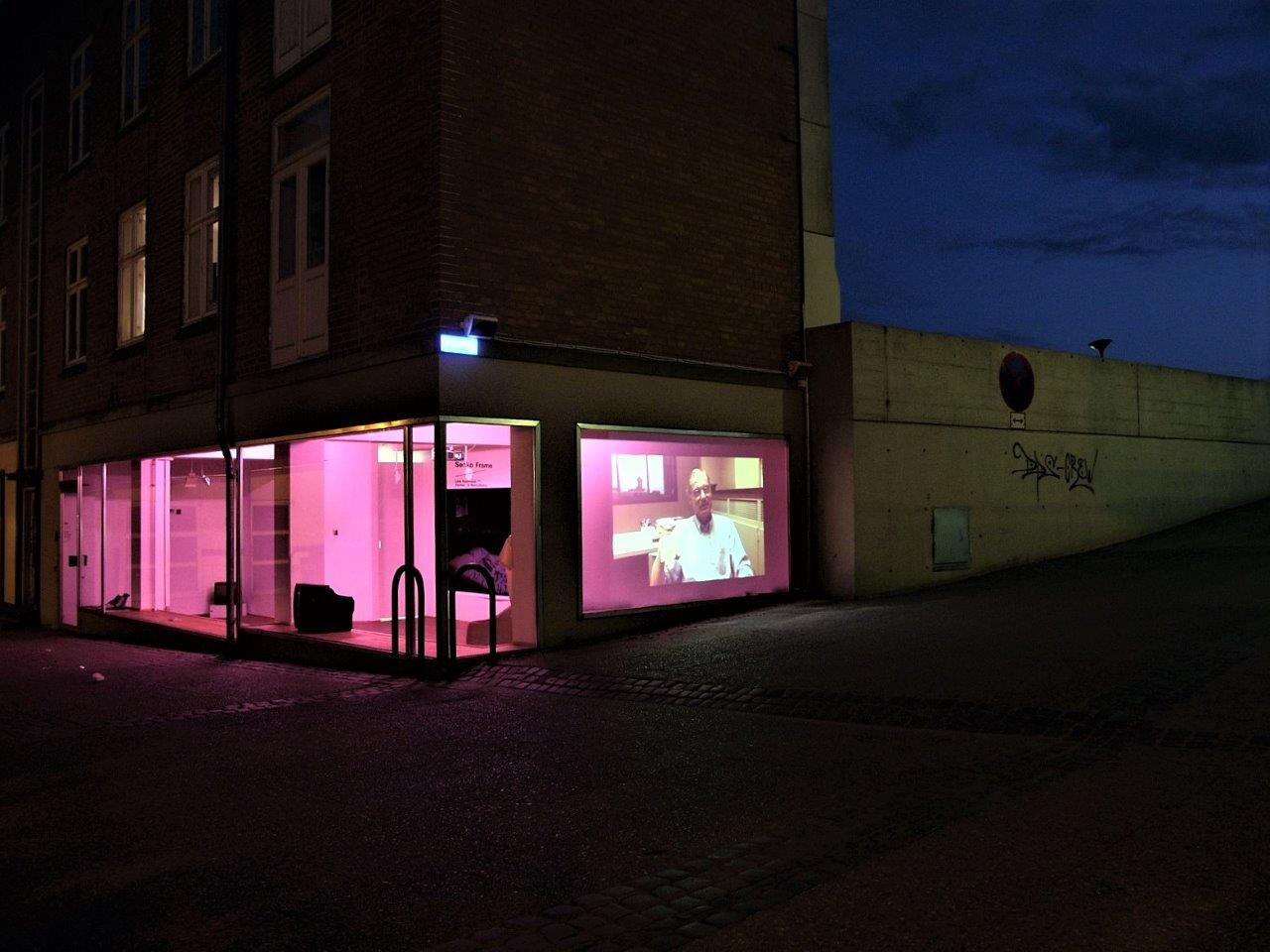
Senko Studio

In the beginning of the millennium Sviatchenko opened a non-profit exhibition studio Senko-Studio in Viborg. The name of the studio is made up of the first two and last three letters of his first and last names Sergei Sviatchenko. Internationally recognized artists from several different countries participated in the studio's exhibitions. For a number of years the studio became a place of experimentation for young artists who worked in various media, while already recognized designers could exhibit their works which were specifically created for display in Senko Studio. Over seven years, Senko Studio hosted 72 exhibitions of contemporary art.

== Collage ==
Collage is found in Sviatchenko's work already in the beginning of the 1980s. In Sviatchenko's collages, a dialogue takes place between the material and the immaterial, between the realistic and the surrealistic. His collages comprise a kind of fusion of the recognizable and the unconscious, specific and symbolic, the detailed and the spontaneous. Two art movements are present in Sviatchenko's collages, of which one is anchored in Constructivism and the other in Surrealism. Sergei Sviatchenko's collages are created among other under the influence of the classical representatives of the historical Ukrainian avant-garde such as Alexander Rodchenko, El Lissitzky, Kazimir Malevich and Gustav Klutsis. Inspired by the avant-garde of constructivism and the Bauhaus school movement, a connection between architecture, photomontage, scenography, decoration, design solutions and clothing style is created in Sviatchenko's artistic expression. Besides, the inspiration from Cubism, Dadaism and Surrealism is a characteristic feature in Sviatchenko's collages. The method in Sviatchenko's collages is often based on a vertical-horizontal structure which can likewise be found in many of his paintings and photographs. His compositions are often created with a minimum of elements such as fragments of human figures, buildings or recognizable objects which are combined by the artist into a new sculptural form.

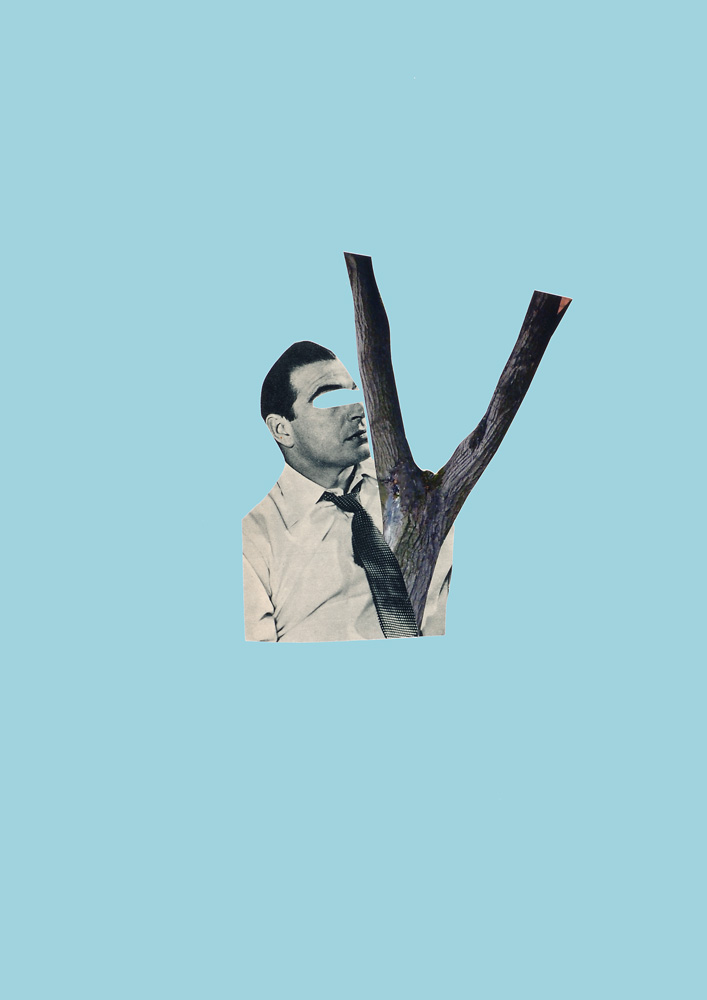
From the series "Less" (2009)

In Sviatchenko's work as a whole but primarily in his collages, the inspiration from the cult film "Mirror" (1975) plays a central role. The film's poetic aesthetics, its artistic language and symbolism and its figurative execution of time and space became a model for Sviatchenko's artistic creativity. A number of works of art by Sviatchenko are dedicated to the film "Mirror". The collages created in the "Mirror"-series are made on the basis of film strips from the original film. In collaboration with the Japanese artist Noriko Okaku, Sergei Sviatchenko created the short film "Mirror to Mirror" which is dedicated to the film "Mirror". The film won first prize at the Lucca Film Festival in 2013. Collages by Sviatchenko have been displayed at exhibitions in Denmark, Germany, Italy, Austria, France, England, Canada, and the United States and published in magazines such as Dazed & Confused, AnOther, Kilimanjaro, Varoom, Elephant, Rojo, Viewpoint, Blueprint, DAMn, Euroman, LOFFICIEL, Stiletto, Arena, Neon, Free & Easy and many others.

== Less Collage ==
The concept Less-collage emerged in the 2000s as a trend within modern conceptual collage and was introduced for the first time by Sergei Sviatchenko in 2004. Less-collage arose as a reaction to many fragmented, "congested" compositions in classical and modern collages. What is unique about Sviatchenko's Less-collages and characteristic of his imagery are firstly the distinct cut in selected images and secondly the number of elements in the collage which deliberately is minimized to two or three at the most. Unusually light colour backgrounds (few selected colours) highlight the motives and make them visually more convex, giving the otherwise flat images a sharper edged dimension. A further characteristic of the Less-collage is the absence of a precise geography and history. The elements have been torn out of their original reality and historical context and create instead a new room of interpretation in which the viewer can reflect.

== Painting ==
Sviatchenko's earliest image ideas were stylistically formed in his paintings at the end of 1990. The original idea was carried out in a number of paintings first displayed at the exhibition "Ukrainian Art 1960-80s" which opened in Kyiv in 1990 and then in Fyns Kunstmuseum in Odense. The principal artwork from this series was called "Joy Beyond the Mountains" (1989), which was inspired by the painters from the so-called Peredvizhniki cooperative ("The Wanderers" 1870–1923). In the 1990s Sviatchenko continued working in this style after having settled down in Denmark. In the earliest artworks, the paintings in this series also included short texts as well as heraldic symbols and ornaments. Sviatchenko showcased this early series in full at FIAC – The international contemporary art fair in Paris in 1994 and at Galleri NORD (Randers, Denmark). The style mostly associated with Sviatchenko is especially characterized by an abstract expressionism with markings of landscape motifs applied with a significant palette and often with an atmosphere of contemplative repose pointing to the artist's preoccupation with the catharsis-theme. Moreover, lines and sketchings of architectural figures are an element of many paintings, and in recent years Sviatchenko has experimented by including features from collage in characteristic mixed media. His paintings have recently become more expressive and wild and thus more spontaneous like the collages. This is especially evident in the paintings from the series "The First Snow in Bauhaus" (2020) and "All This and more" (2022).

== Close Up And Private ==
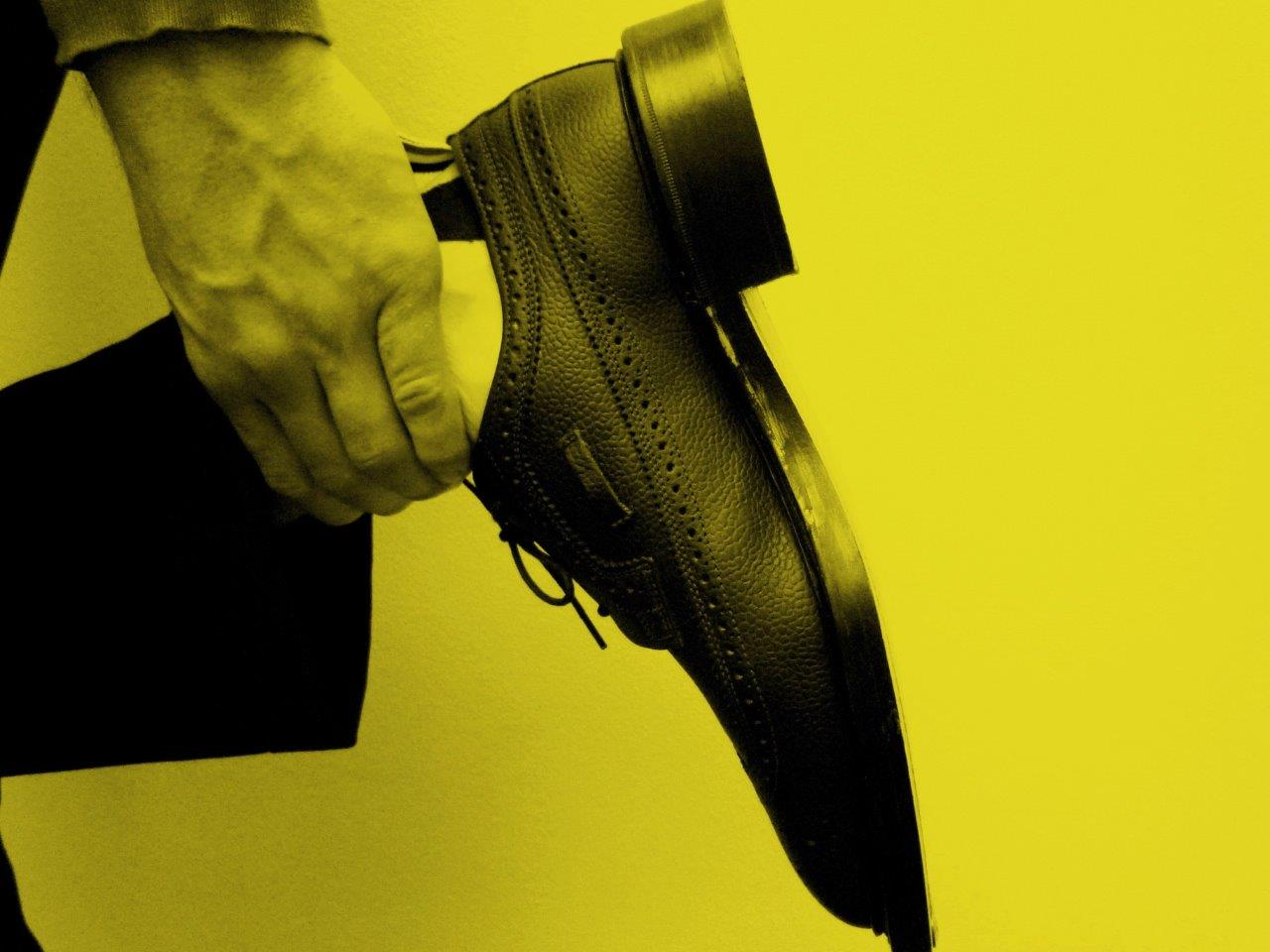
From CUAP

In 2009, Sviatchenko together with his youngest son Erik Sviatchenko began work on the project Close Up And Private (CUAP). The website started as an artistic photo project centered around the details in a man's wardrobe, his private/personal expression and style. "Close Up And Private" brings fashion photography into an artistic frame towards a more abstract understanding that views style and fashion as elements in a new aesthetic. In 2010, Sviatchenko using the pseudonym Sergey Nielsen created an image version of Close Up And Private, in 2011 a collage version "Less CUAP". Close Up And Private has collaborated with brands such as Costume National, Gant Rugger, Dickies, Mismo, Jack & Jones by Premium, Harris Tweed, AN IVY, S.T. VALENTIN and others who create new artistic interpretations and designs. According to an opinion poll conducted by the magazine Euroman, Sviatchenko has several times been voted "best-dressed man in Denmark" in 2010, 2014 and 2019.

== Gallery ==
- "You". Retrospective exhibition. Viborg Kunsthal, 2017
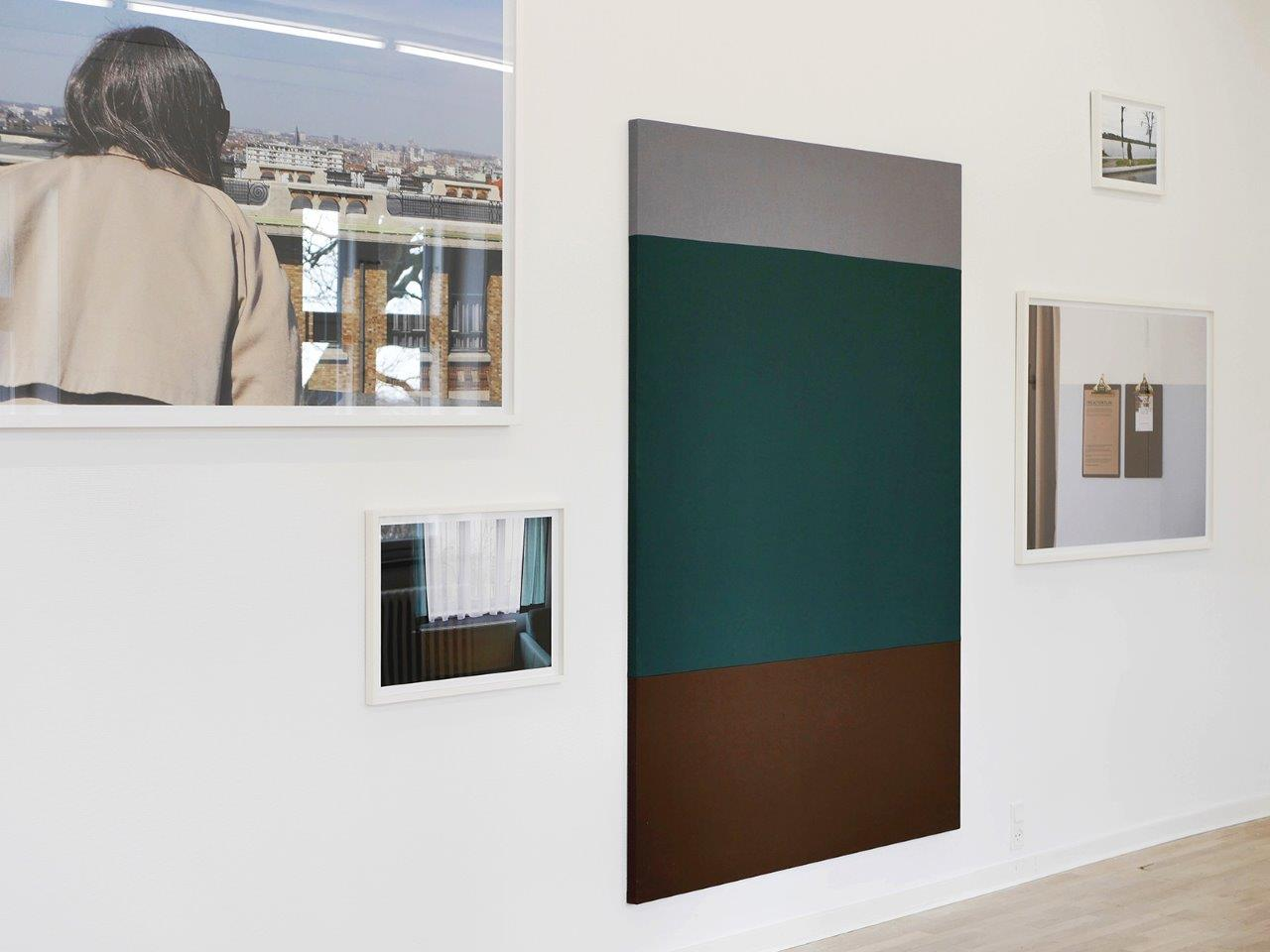

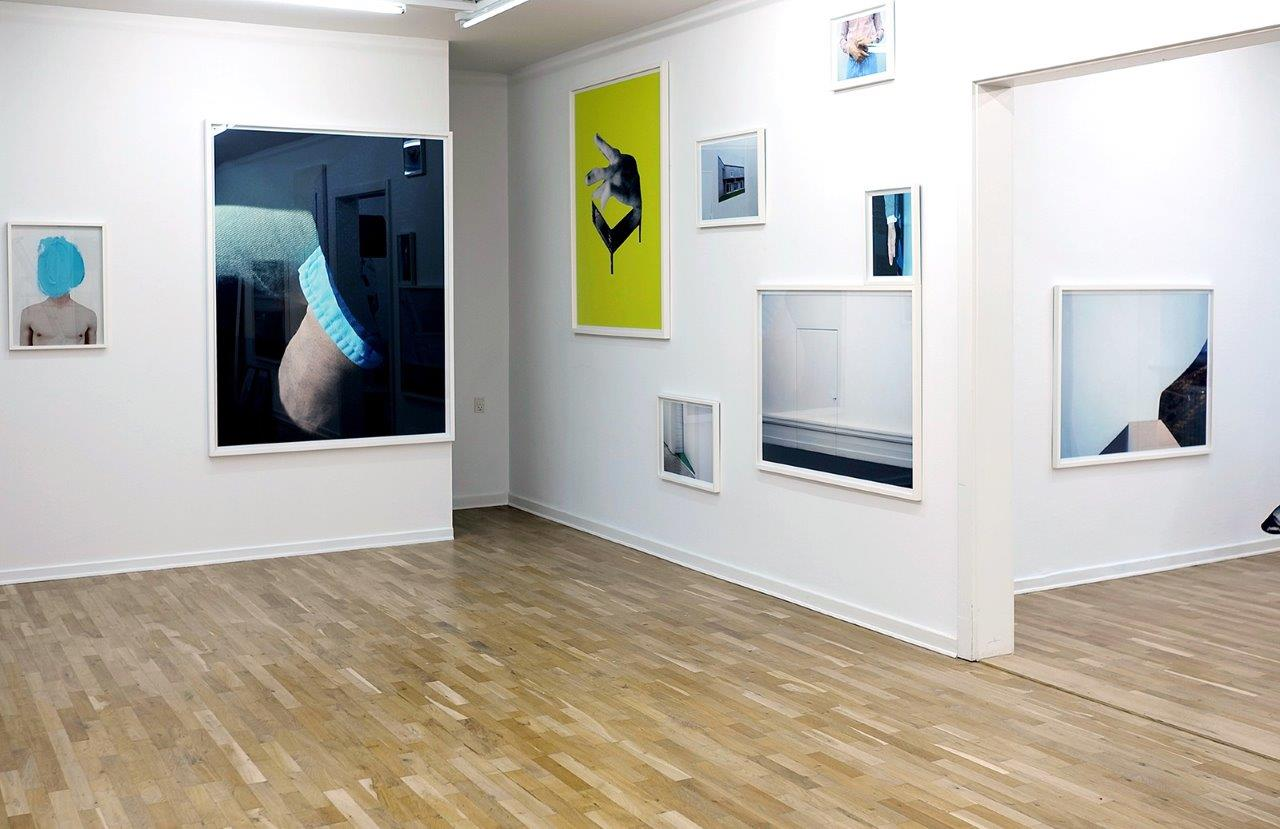

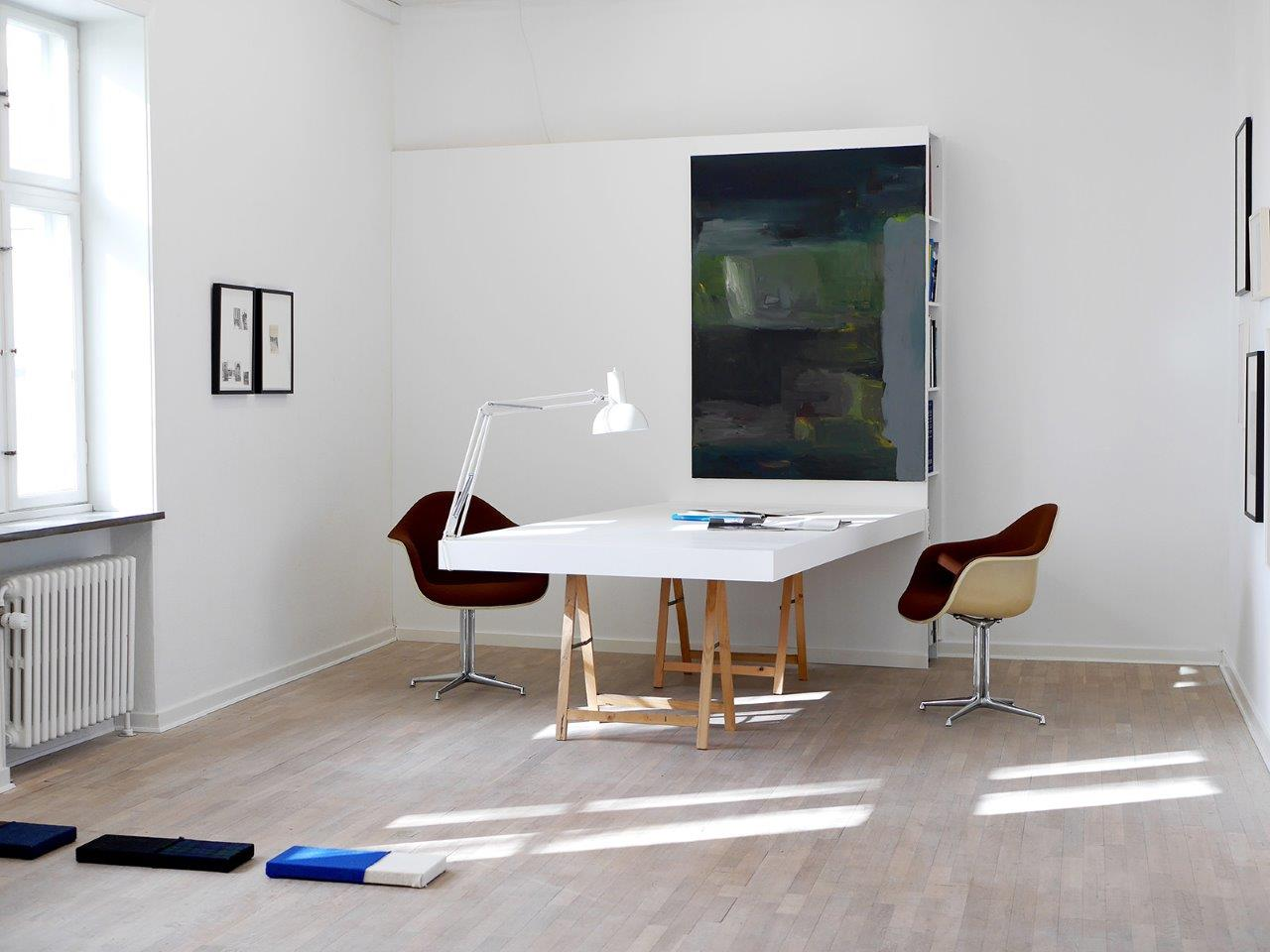

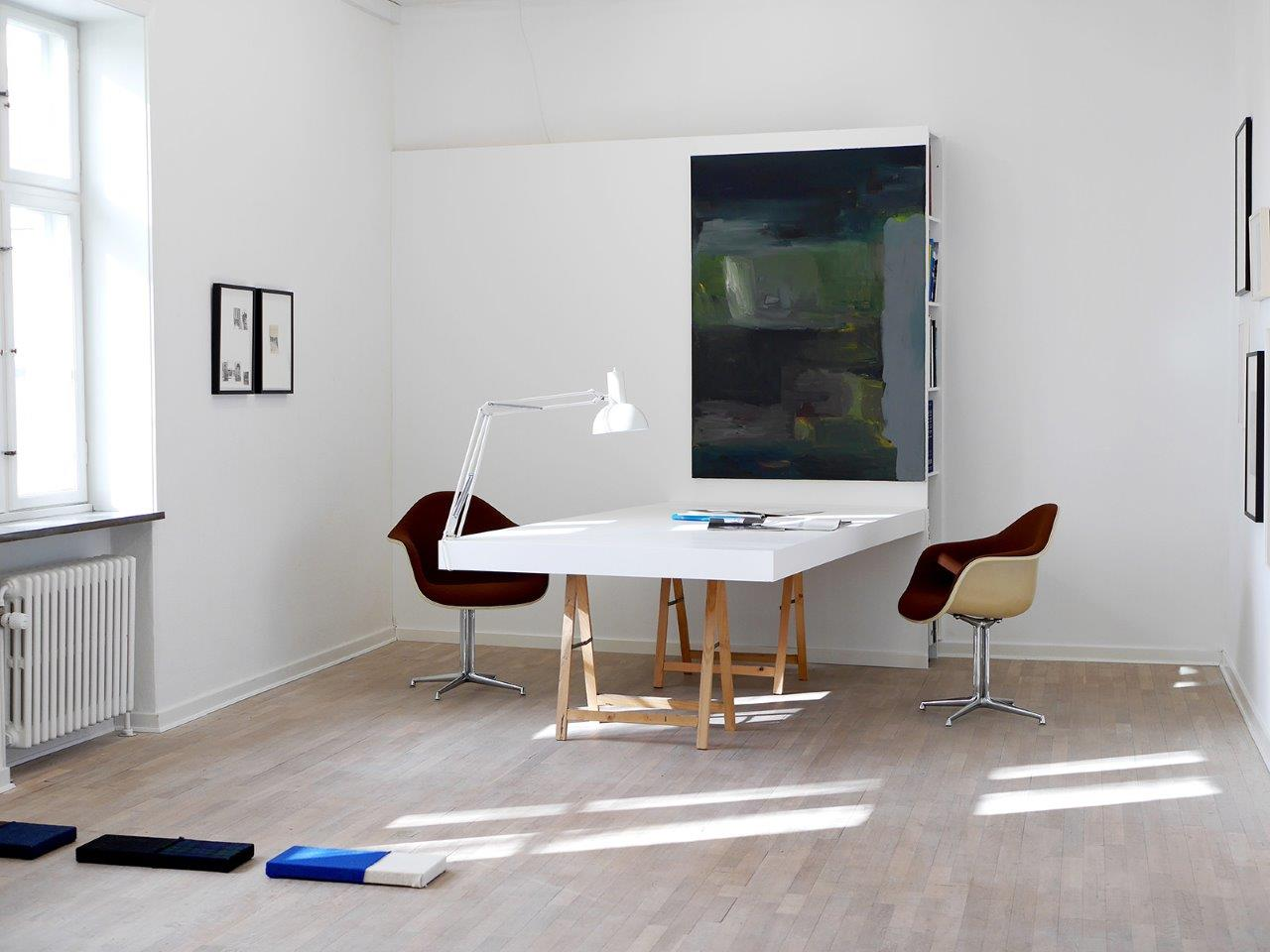
- "Nattergalen" (The Nightingale) – scenography and costume design for Dansk Danseteater, 2020
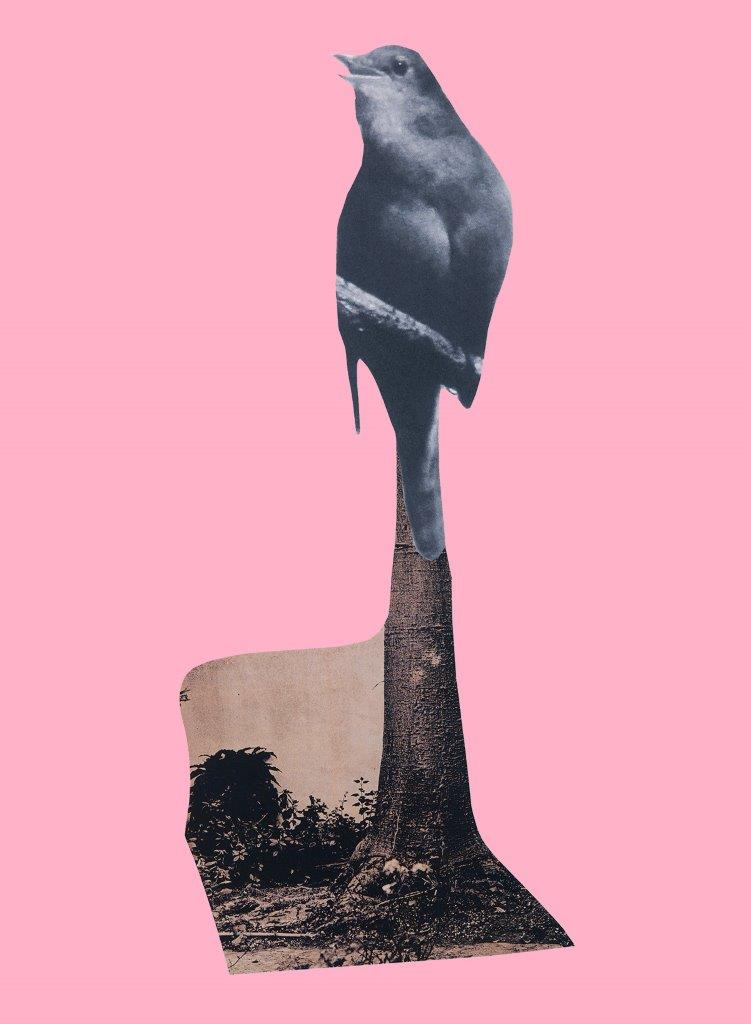

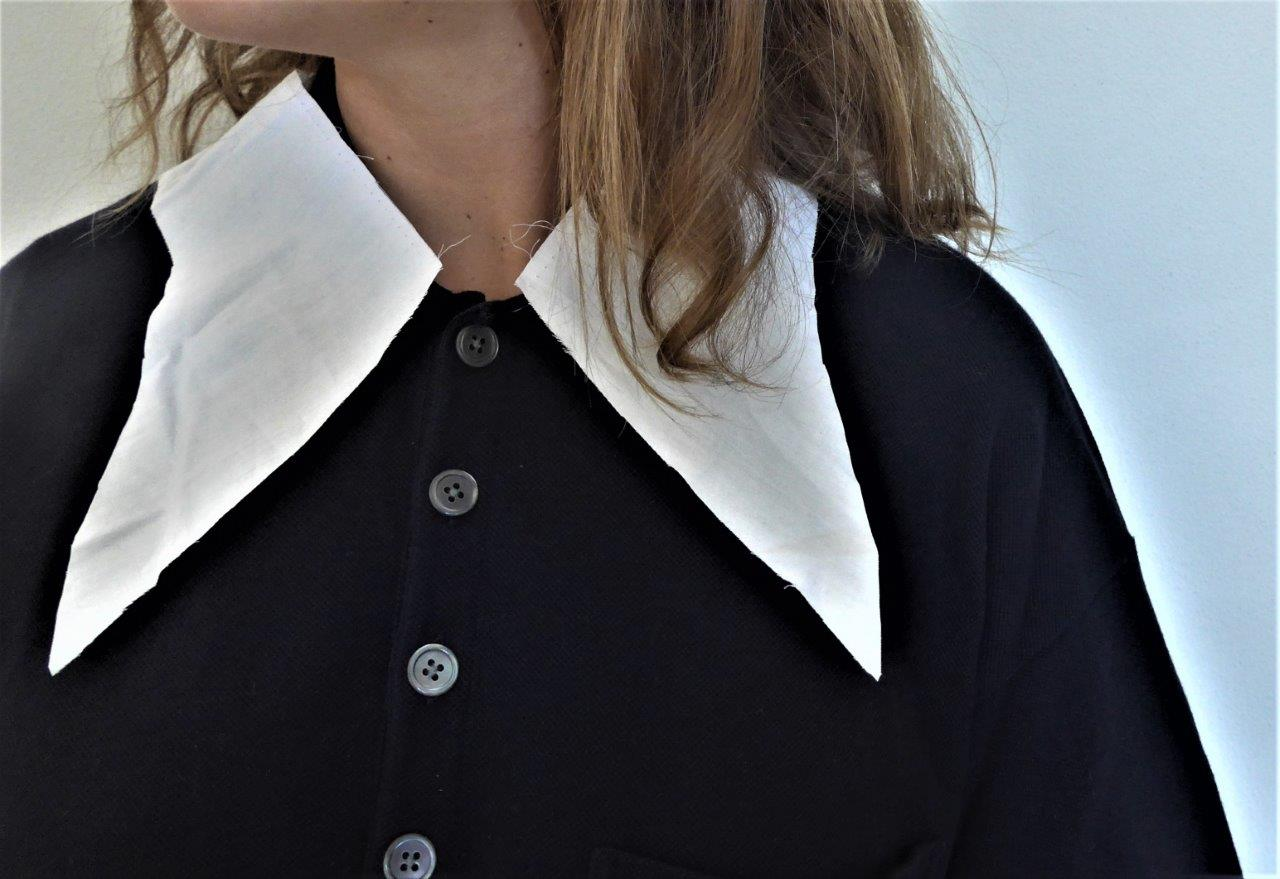

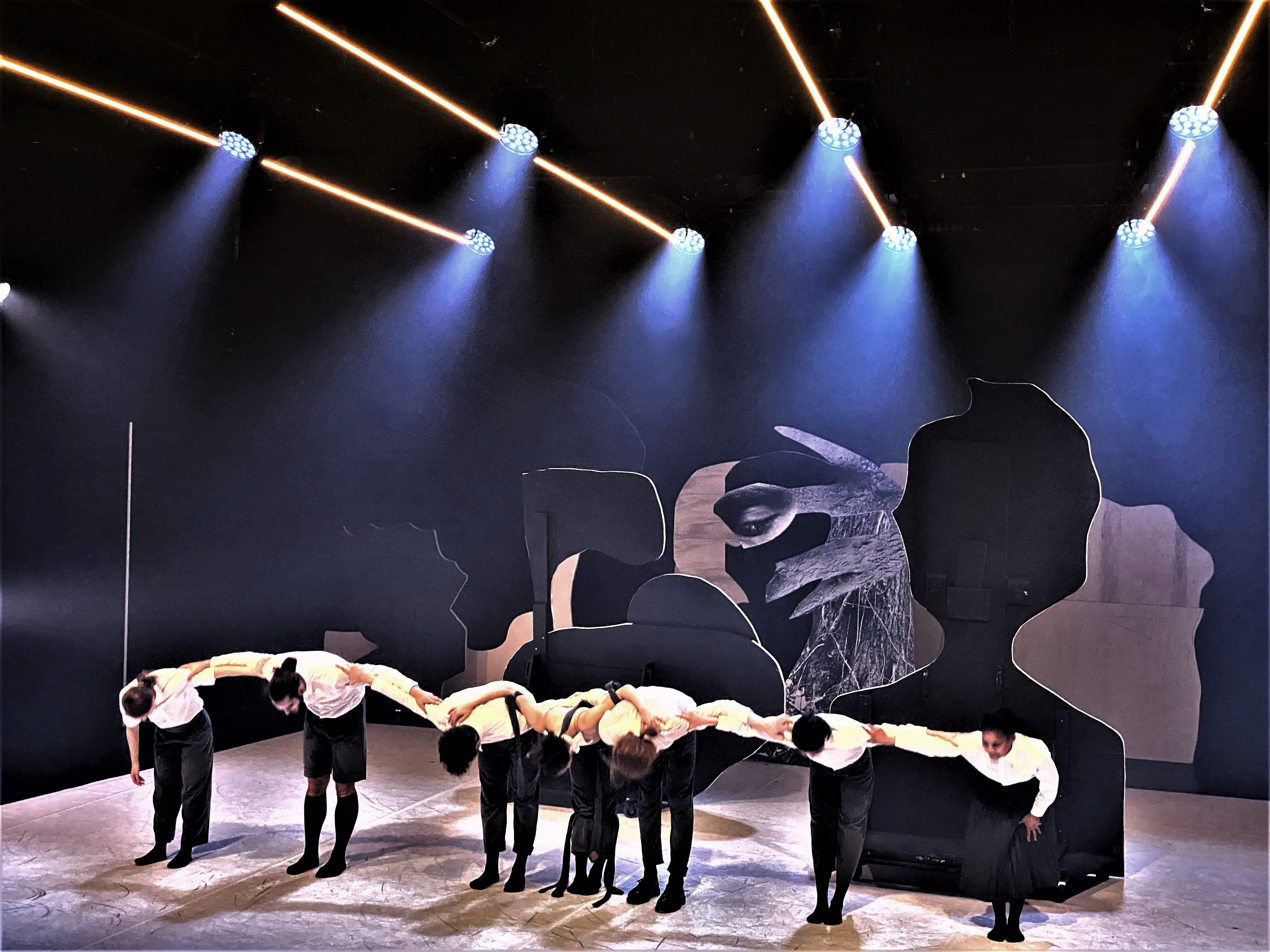

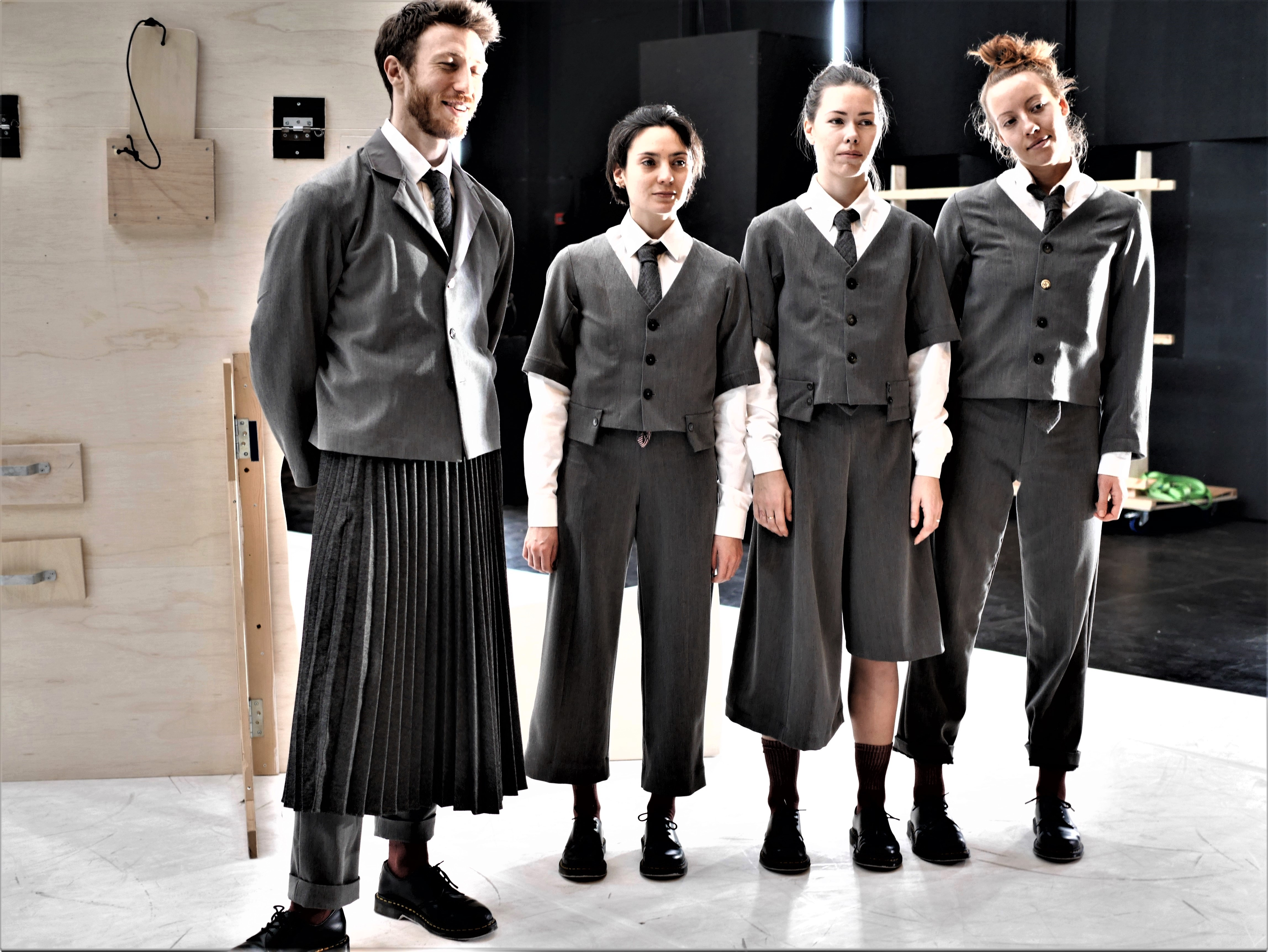

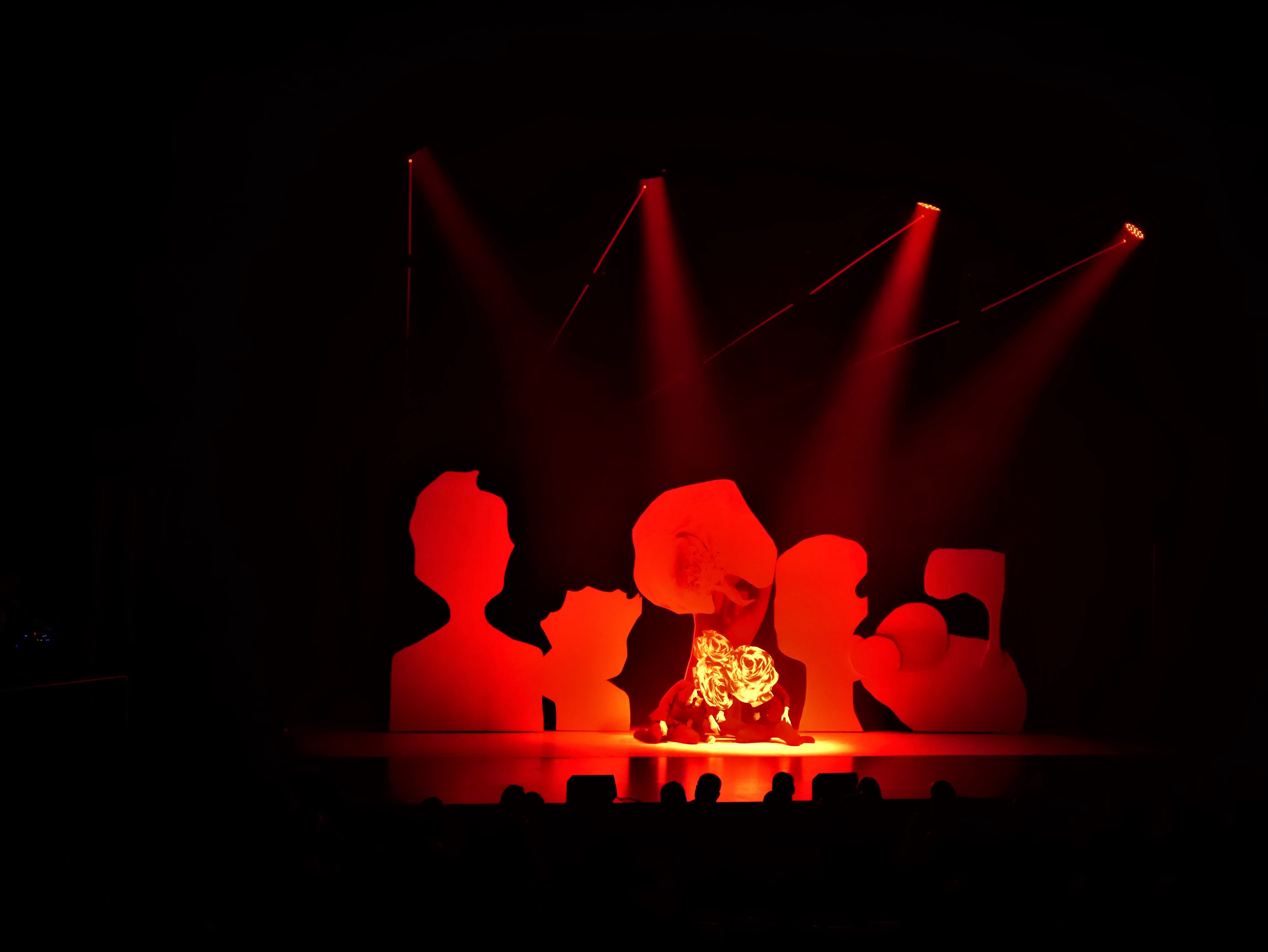

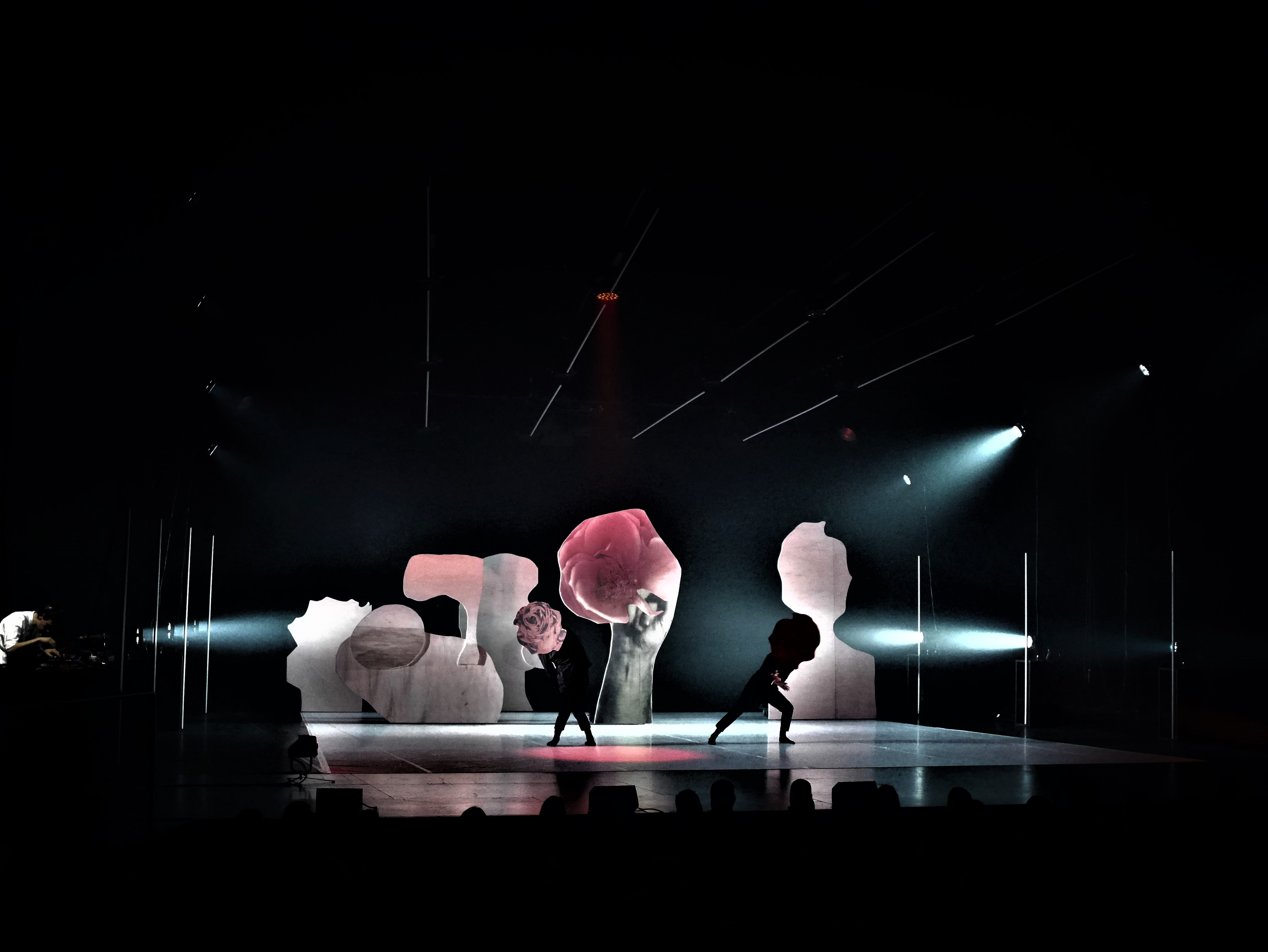

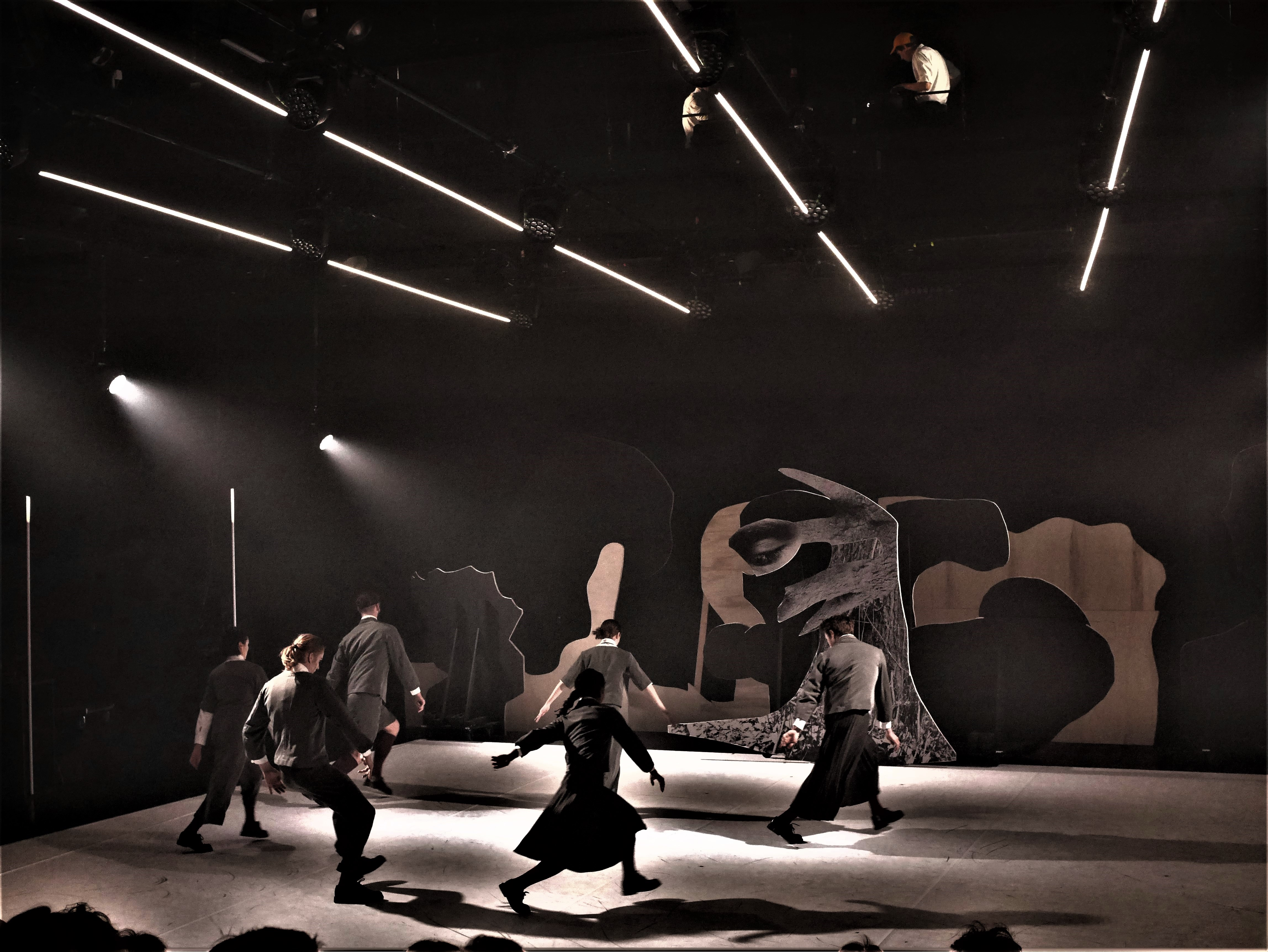
- "Better than the Moon", Fredericia Kunstforening, 2020
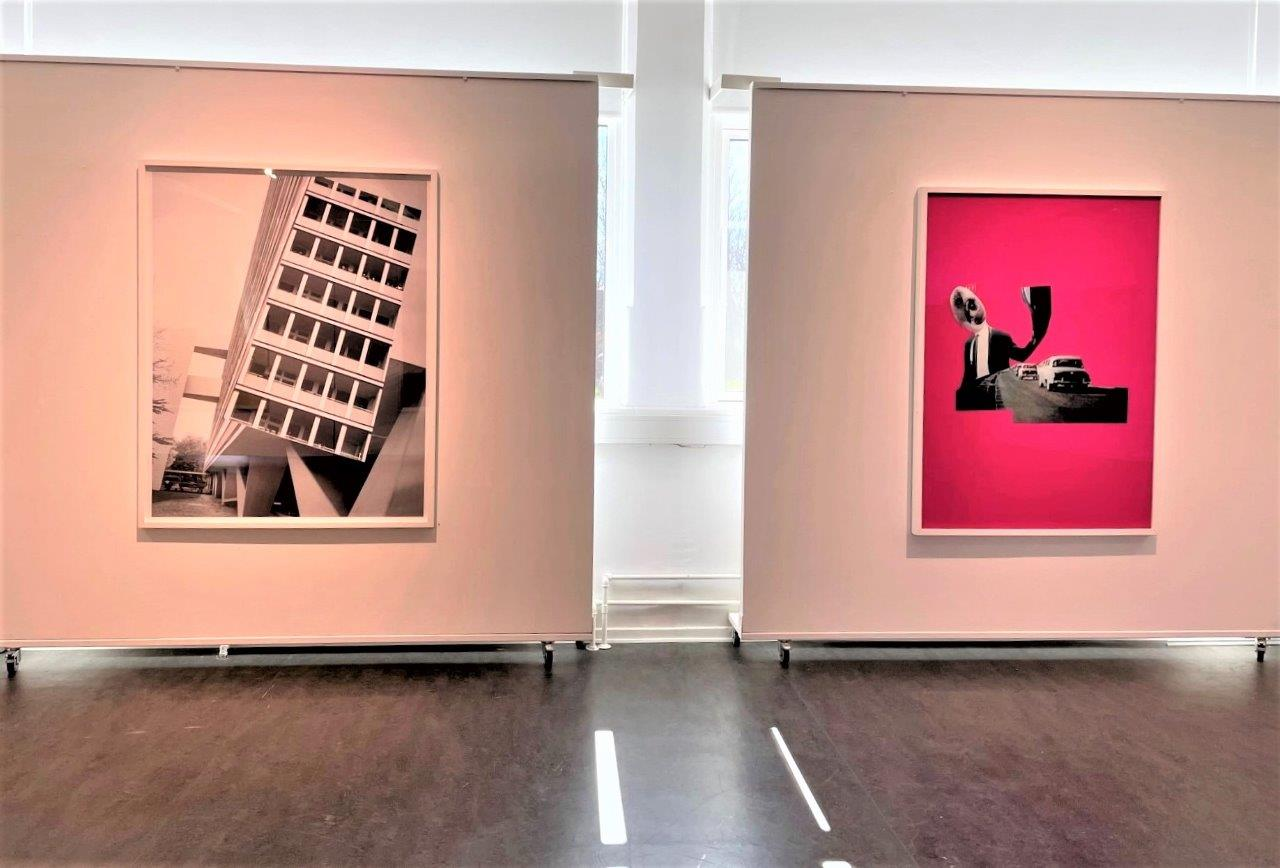

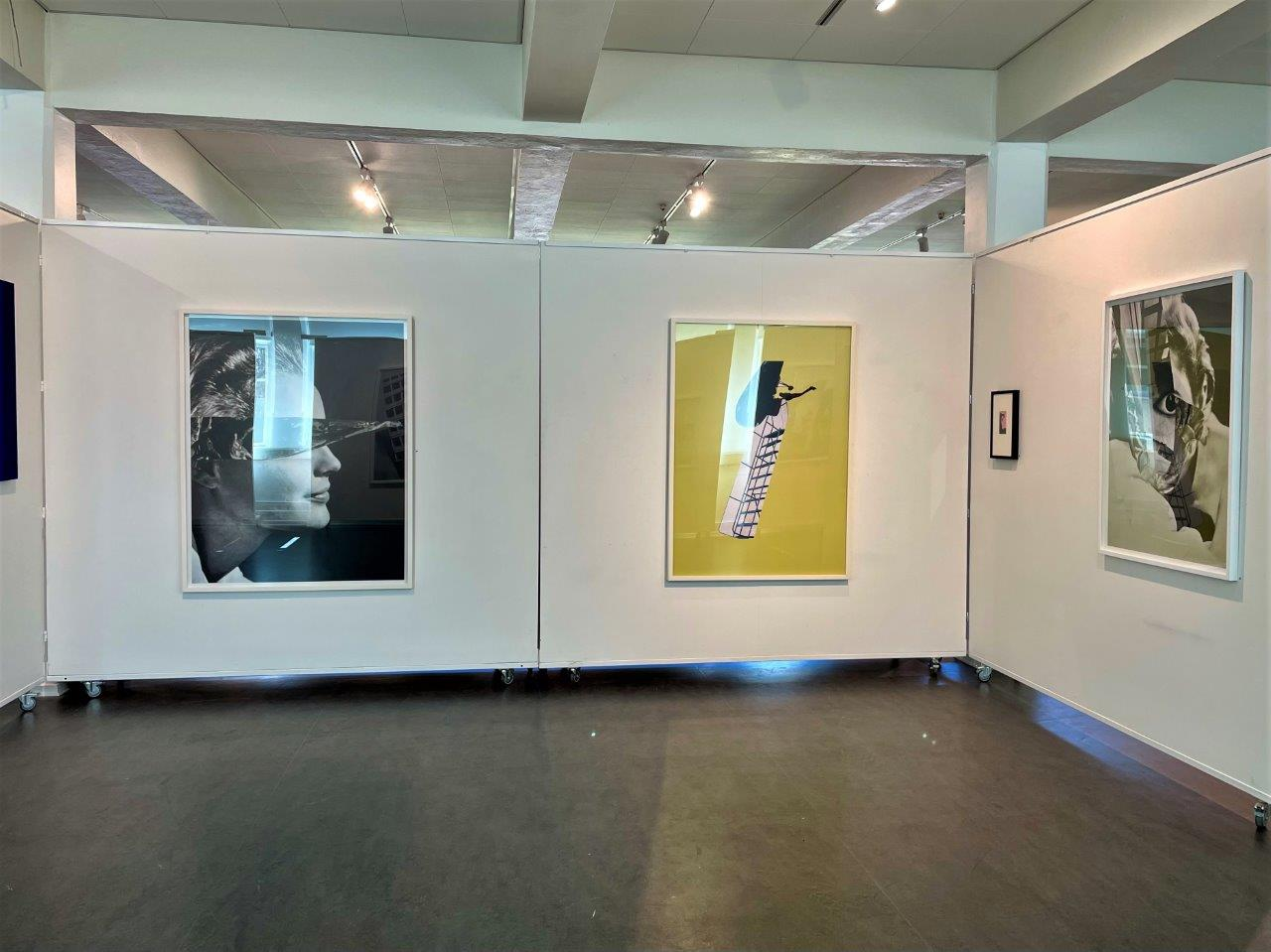

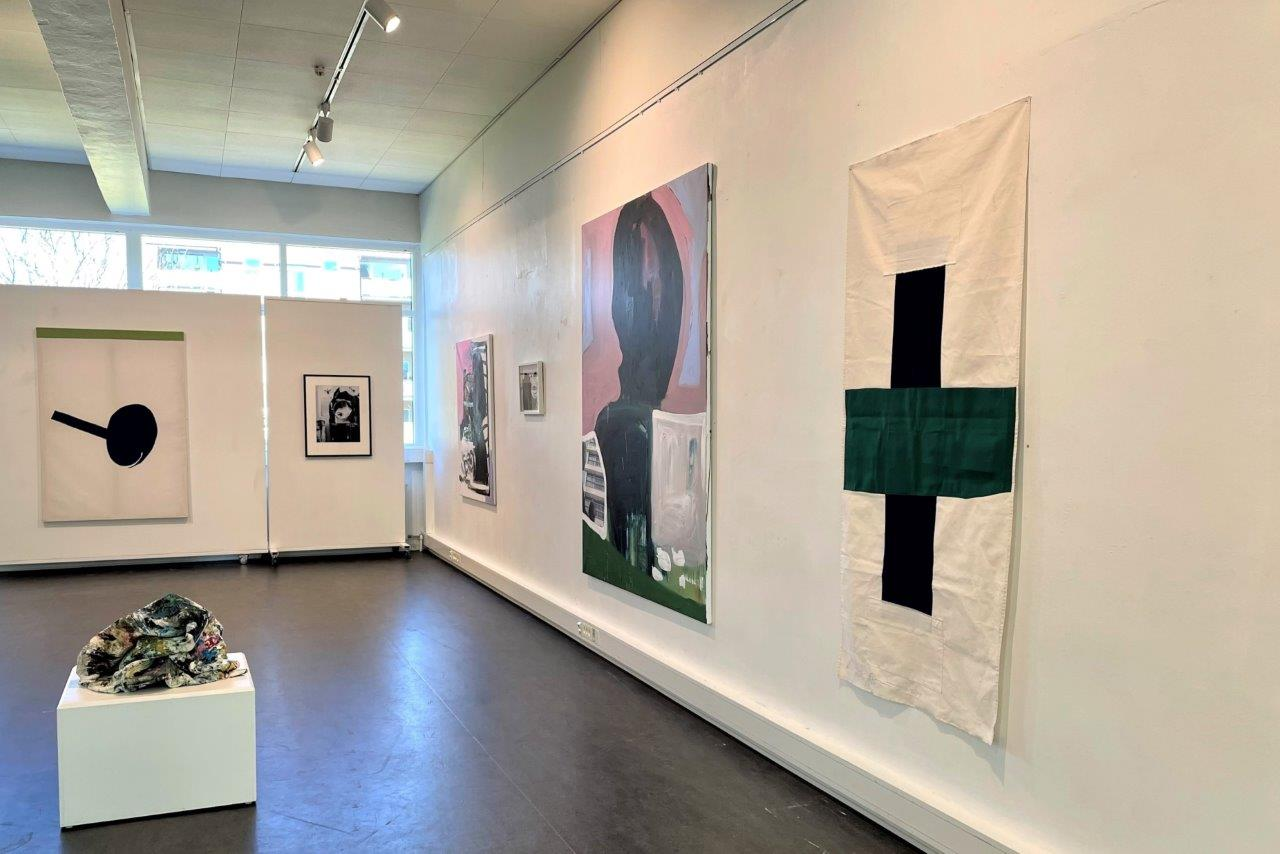

== Exhibitions ==
=== Selected solo exhibitions ===
- 2024 HOPE - sculpture in bronze, KunstCentret Silkeborg Bad, Denmark
- 2024 Kharkiv. Riders of Hope, KunstCentret Silkeborg Bad, Sculpturpark, Denmark.
- 2023 Magical Island is falling in the fall, maleri, collage, Galerie Stephan Marquardt, Brussels.
- 2022 All This in a Town, a Tribute to the City of Viborg, The City Hall, Denmark
- 2022 Emotional Rescue - collage, installation, KunstCentret Silkebord Bad, Skovhuset, Denmark
- 2021 Better than the Moon, Fredericia Art Association, Fredericia, Denmark
- 2019 Dream Machine, Homage to Interbau 57, Hansa center and the Danish Embassy, Berlin
- 2019 WE, collage, photography, paintings, Galerie Didier Devillez, Stephan Marquardt & Gallery, Brussels, Belgium
- 2018 Nature Matter, curated by Fay Dawling, Silkeborg Art Centre, Denmark
- 2018 End of Spring, Kyiv Art Week, Ukraine
- 2018 Artist Take by Sergei Sviatchenko for Magasin du Nord», Copenhagen
- 2017 You, Retrospective, curated by Helene Nyborg Bay, Kunsthal Viborg, Denmark
- 2016 Secretly, Wall installation at the MQ Fore Court, Vienna
- 2015 Collages, Augustiana center for contemporary art, Denmark
- 2013 For Light and Memory, Gestalten Space, Berlin
- 2012 Mirror by Mirror, Homage to Andrei Tarkovsky, photocollage, installation, Riga Film Museum, Riga, Latvia
- 2009 Mirror by Mirror, Homage to Andrei Tarkovsky, photocollage, installation, West Cork Arts Centre, Cork, Ireland
- Mirror by Mirror, Homage to Andrei Tarkovsky, photocollage, installation, Gallery Photo Edition Berlin, Berlin, Germany
- Broken Images, Liaison Controverse, Düsseldorf, Germany
- The Shape of White, Visual Studies Workshop, Rochester New York, US
- 2008 The Trip, Homage to the Psychedelic era, collage installation, ROJO artspace, Barcelona, Spain
- 2006 You are Not the Only One, installation, video, photography, Filosofgangen, Odense, Denmark
- 2000 Katarsis, installation, video, photography, Aarhus School of Architecture, Aarhus, Denmark
- Time, Kunsthallen Braenderigaard, Viborg, Denmark
- Mixed Landscape, installation, video, photography, Nielsen & Holm-Møller Museet, Holstebro, Denmark
- 1995 Works, Galerie Egelund, Copenhagen, Denmark
- 1994 The Wind, Gallery Nord, Denmark
- FIAC (International Art Fair), Gallery Nord, Paris, France
- 1992 Galerie Egelund, Copenhagen, Denmark
- 1991 Celebration, Gallery Nord, Randers, Denmark
- 1991 Gallery Thea Fisher-Reinhardt, West Berlin, Germany
- 1990 Gallery at the magazine Decorative Art of USSR, Moscow, USSR
- 1986 Institute of Design, Kyiv, Ukraine, USSR

=== Group exhibitions ===
- 2025 Uncurtained: Ukrainian Art in Danish Collections 1989-2023". The Ukraine House, CPH.
- 2024 Collided, Skovgaard Museum, Viborg, DK.
- 2024 Imagine Definite Circles, With Cartier, The West Bund Art Center, Shanghai.
- 2023 People Live Here, Ministry of Foreign Affairs in Ukraine, Kyiv.
- 2023 Black And White, The National Academy of Arts of Ukraine, Kyiv.
- 2023 Ukrainian Collage, National Museum "Kyiv Art Gallery, Kyiv.
- 2023 Art Without Borders. Auction to benefit the National Academy of Arts of Ukraine, London.
- 2022 WAR ART, from the series Absence, Irpen Town (2022). Biruchiy, Warsaw.
- 2022 Unfolding Landscapes. Landscape and poetics in contemporary Ukrainian Art, Stiftung Kunst(Zeug)Haus, Rapperswil-Jona, Schweiz.
- 2022 Unfolding Landscapes. Landscale and poetics in contemporary Ukrainian Art.The Royal Museum of Art and History, Brussels
- 2022 Unfolding Landscapes. Landscale and poetics in contemporary Ukrainian Art. KunstCentret Silkeborg Bad, Denmark
- 2020 Less Festival for Contemporary Collage, Gentle Melody for Nature — Homage for P.C. Skovgaard, Viborg, Denmark
- 2019 You Know My Name, Photo Kyiv Fair, Kyiv, Ukraine
- 2017 Face and Identity, Kunstcenter Silkeborg Bad, Denmark
- Meta-Matter, curated by Faye Dawling, Karst, Plymouth, UK
- 2016 Detached, Now and tomorrow, EIKON gallery at MQ, Vienna
- 2010 21st International Poster and Graphic Design Festival, Chaumont, France
- 2009 The Shape of White, Visual Studies Workshop, Rochester NY, USA
- 2008 Ink 01, International Illustration Rally, Fundación Bilbao Arte Fundazioa, Bilbao,
- Rojo Out, Reina Sofia Contemporary Art Museum, Madrid, Spain
- 2005 Playface, collage installation, Trevi Flash Art Museum, Italy
- Display, collage installation, Kforumvienna, Vienna, Austria
- Plotarteurope, Museo laboratorio di arte contemporanea, Rome, Italy
- 2000 Art 2000, Berkeley Square Gallery, London, UK
- 1999 Art Miami, Galerie Egelund, Miami, USA
- 1998 Artissima, Galerie Egelund, Turin, Italy
- 1996 Galerie Protée, Paris, France
- Art Cologne, Galerie Egelund, Cologne, Germany
- 1995 Kunstrai Art Fair Kunsthandel Frans Jacob, Amsterdam, Netherlands
- 1993 FIAC (International Art Fair), Gallery Nord, Paris, France
- 1990 Flash — New Ukrainian Art, House of Architects, Kyiv, Ukraine, USSR
- Three Generations of Ukrainian Paintings: 1960s-1980s, Kyiv- Denmark
- 1989 Кiev — Kaunas exhibition of contemporary Ukrainian art, Kyiv
- 1989 The 1st Soviet-American Exhibition, Kyiv, Kharkiv, Tbilisi, USSR

== External references ==
- Sergei Sviatchenko: Collages | SCHLEBRUGGE.EDITOR (schlebruegge.com)
- Sergei Sviatchenko - Jeg er en collage læseprøve by Lindhardt og Ringhof / Forlaget Carlsen - Issuu
- SERGEI SVIATCHENKO & 10 YEARS WITH 'CUAP' – AN IVY COPENHAGEN (an-ivy.com)
- Nature Matter (silkeborgbad.dk)
- Interview: Sergei Sviatchenko
- Sergei Sviatchenko - MuseumsQuartier Wien (mqw.at)
- You searched for sergei sviatchenko
- 1.6K views · 19 reactions | Kunsten møder erhvervslivet på Tradium HHX | På Tradium HHX er kreativitet en vigtig del af uddannelsen. Derfor har kunstneren Sergei Sviatchenko, skabt en ny installation til skolen, som også nogle... | By Tradium - HHX | Facebook
- Light and Memory – Painting and Collage by Sergei Sviatchenko | Multiple Identities of a Face (wordpress.com)
- closeupandprivate.com
- For Light and Memory. Painting and Collage by Sergei Sviatchenko
- senko.dk
- {{ ($root.post && $root.post.id) ? $root.post.translations[$root.lang].socialTitle : $root.seo.pageTitle | translate | stripHtml }}
- Abramovych.Art - Sergei Sviatchenko - Biography
- «EVERYTHING GOES RIGHT AND LEFT IF YOU WANT IT» PAINTING AND COLLAGE BY SERGEI SVIATCHENKO
- Sergei Sviatchenko «The world of art is extremely diverse! Experiment more!»
- Danish artist of Ukrainian origin Sergei Sviatchenko and his creative credo
- Collage Now: Sergei Sviatchenko: Design Observer
- cut above: inside the spirited collage worlds of Sergei Sviatchenko — The Calvert Journal
- Sviatchenko: Collages Another Something
