= Biruchiy contemporary art project =

Leading residence of contemporary art in Ukraine

Biruchiy contemporary art project Міжнародний симпозіум сучасного мистецтва «Бірючий»
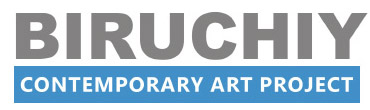
- Status: active
- Genre: contemporary art
- Frequency: annually (May, September)
- Venue: Zolotiy Bereg
- Locations: Byriuchyi Island, Sea of Azov
- Country: Ukraine
- Inaugurated: 7 September 2006
- Founder: Association of Contemporary Art Researchers
- Participants: 64 (2014)
- Website: biruchiyart.com.ua

The Biruchiy contemporary art project (Ukrainian: Міжнародний симпозіум сучасного мистецтва «Бірючий» [miʒnɐˈrɔdnɪj sɪmˈpɔz⁽ʲ⁾iʊm sʊˈtʃɑsnoɦo mɪsˈtɛtstwɐ biˈrutʃɪj]) is a leading residence of contemporary art in Ukraine. It was founded in 2006 by the Association of Contemporary Art Researchers. The project is held annually in May and September on the Byriuchyi Island, located in the Sea of Azov.

Since 2016, offsite residences have been operating in other European countries (Poland, 2016–2017, 2023–2025; Montenegro, 2019; France, 2024), since 2025, a branch has been operating in Italy. 19 seasons of Biruchiy contemporary art project were attended by 264 artists and 14 art groups from 22 countries. A part of participants are heading to other residencies in Italy (2014–2017), United States (2017–2018).

== Project background ==
=== Byriuchyi Island (Ukraine) ===
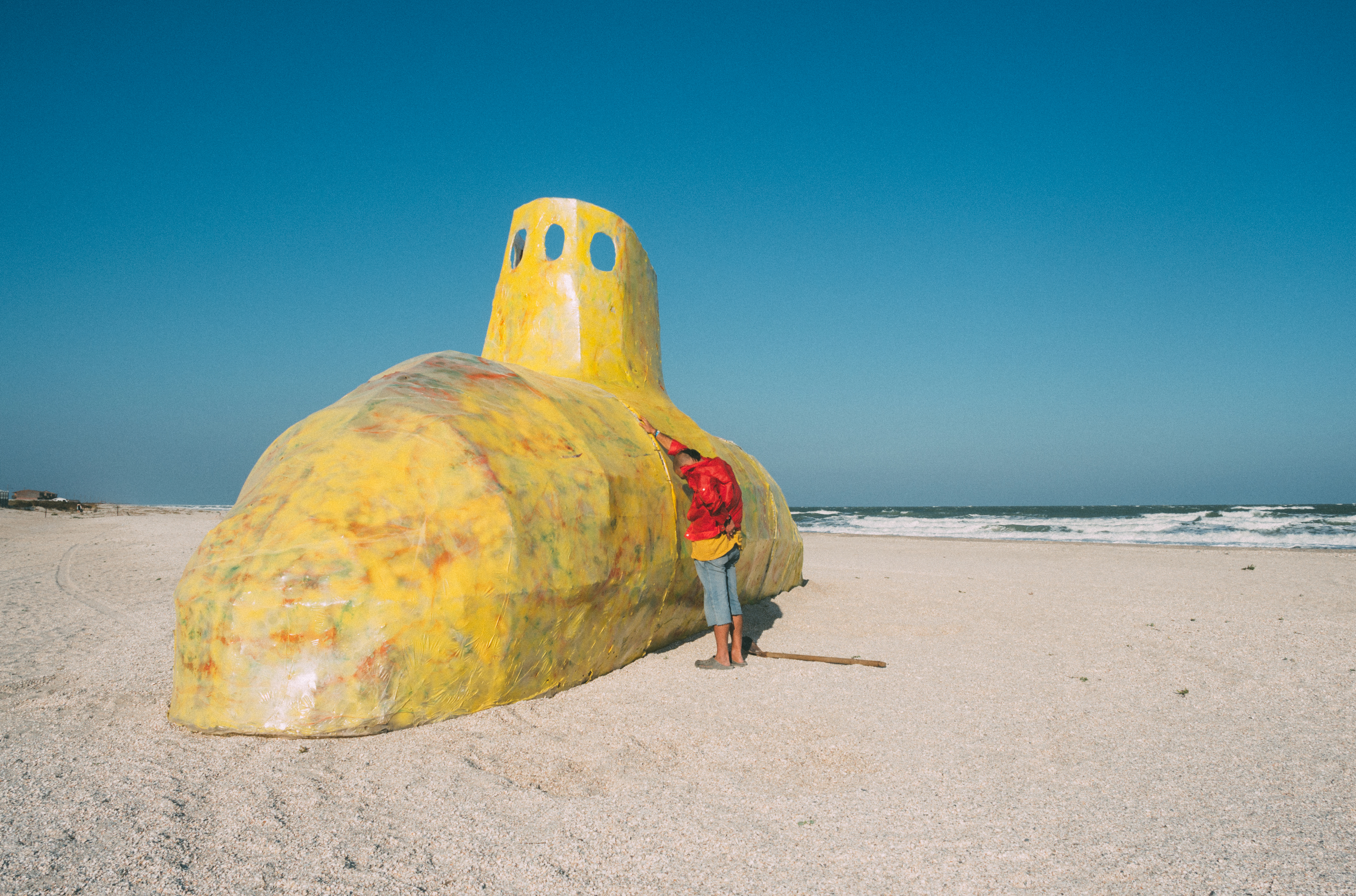
Volodymyr Gulich, Dmytro Dulfan, Nastya Loyko, Oleksiy Chepygin, Alina Yakubenko. "Hallelujah." Wire, fittings, polyethylene. 2014.

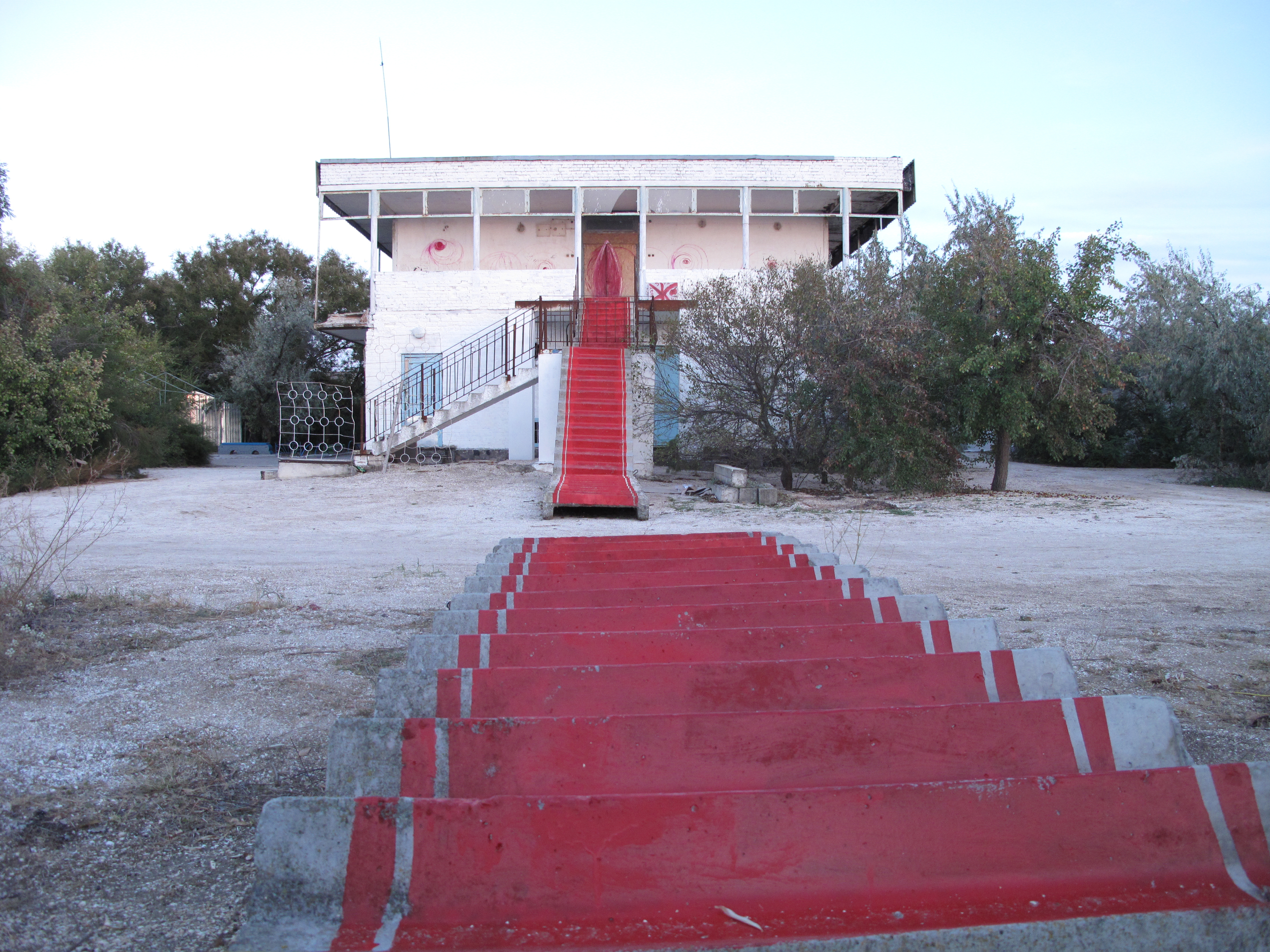
Zhanna Kadyrova. "Red carpet." Installation. 2013.

Ukraine. The Ukrainian initiative of the beginning of the 21st century was founded by the art production manager Gennadiy Kozub and the artist Volodymyr Gulich. In 2006, it was decided to declare Zaporizhia Oblast to be an art territory. Byriuchyi Island (Zolotiy Bereg recreation centre), which is far away from civilization, was chosen to be the project residency. Artists came to Byriuchyi for two weeks in September. Since 2014, two-week gatherings have been held also in May.

Biruchiy 009 holds an outdoor concert performed by the French cellist and composer Dominique de Williencourt. Biruchiy M Sound Lab was launched at Biruchiy 012 (DJ Sokolov, DJ Mishukov, DJ Expert, Maket/Ivanov Down, DJ Derbastler). Within the framework of Biruchiy 013, for the first time not only paintings and art objects but also contemporary sculpture was created. During Biruchiy 014, it was decided to change its format by creating an experimental platform for several curators. Due to the hostilities, it was possible to hold only three out of six scheduled curator projects; they were later combined into one big project.

In 2015, the Open Group carried out an international performative project "1000-km view." Riding a catamaran, the participants covered 1000-km distance of "Open Gallery Ukraine – the Netherlands" from the Stryi River to Byriuchyi Island. The new project of Biruchiy was developed as collaboration between curator Irina Leifer (Amsterdam) and Mariya Lanko and Lyzaveta German's team (Kyiv), Open Art Route Zuidoost (Amsterdam) within Tandem Ukraine program (an initiative of the European Cultural Foundation and German non-governmental organization MitOst).

In 2016, the main residence got modern exposition space. The final exposition of Biruchiy 016 was demonstrated in a new gallery designed like an ancient Greek temple. Its musical component has gained an independent format. An experimental ethno-electronic festival called Biruchiy Fest was held in September 16–18, 2016. Among participating bands and performers, there were SHANA, Sun Groove, Atomic Simao and Dub Wire. The British Council introduced an arts exchange program, called "SWAP: UK/Ukraine artist residence programme," between United Kingdom and Ukraine; the first item of the program was on the residence on Byriuchyi Island. The British artist Jamie Fitzpatrick, chosen by the program, joined the participants.

In September 2017, about 30 participants of the project organized a voluntary environmental initiative. The volunteers comprised artists from Ukraine, Russia, Italy and Germany, art critic, curators and guests of the residency. The volunteers cleaned up trash left by tourists, from a 10-km area of the seashore near the Azov-Syvash National Nature Park (from Stepok village to Byriuchyi Island spit).

The Coloring project, introduced in May 2018, brought together 60 artists. Each participant was given a coloring album with 12 outline views of the residency. Coloring pages project is designed as an interactive semi-finished product, which invites participants to put familiar landscapes in color not spending time on their layout.

=== RESÒ Lab (Italy) ===
Italy. In 2013, RESÒ Lab was initiated in collaboration with RESÒ, International Network for Artist Residencies and Educational Programs in Piedmont (Italy). It is a long-term participant exchange project between Biruchiy and leading Italian art foundations. In RESÒ Lab residencies, artists for a few weeks get acquainted with the local art stage. The exchange is both bilateral and unilateral.

In 2013, Byriuchyi Island was visited by Sotheby's representatives, who purchased several painters' works. The residency was also visited by Massimo Melotti, an external relations specialist from Castle of Rivoli museum of contemporary art (Turin). In 2014, due to the war in Eastern Ukraine, RESÒ delayed Italian artists' coming to Byriuchyi Island. Nevertheless, in November 2014, Vitaliy Kokhan, Ivan Svitlychniy and the curator Sergiy Kantsedal invited by RESÒ, visited the residency of Cittadellarte-Fondazione Pistoletto (Biella, Italy).

In autumn 2015, RESÒ sent to Byriuchyi Island a delegation of artists from Italy, headed by Massimo Melotti. Byriuchyi became the filming location for a film by Italian film directors Gianluca and Massimiliano de Serio, who arrived at the Island immediately after participating in Venice International Film Festival. One of the participants of Biruchiy 016 was the Italian film director and artist Giorgio Cugno. He shot here the fourth part of the film "XAU" with the actor Ostap Stupka in the lead role. The previous parts of the film were shot in Colombia, Egypt and the USA.

In the autumn of 2017, the Italian artist Franco Ariaudo arrived in Byriuchyi Island. Elaborating upon the theme of the September residence "Running on water...," he started working on a long-term project titled "Basilisk," a set of events to study techniques of running on water. Franco Ariaudo proceeded with the Basilisk project already in Italy (Turin and Rome) and published a limited edition book "Basilisk or how to run on water" in three languages (Italian, English and Russian). This is a rare case of a separate book dedicated to a single author's art project.

In October–November 2017, members of Biruchiy project Alina Yakubenko and Oleksiy Say visited the residency Cittadellarte-Fondazione Pistoletto. Biruchiy 018 was held through the help of the Ukrainian Cultural Foundation and the Istituto Italiano di Cultura in Kyiv. The 13th season of the project centers around artistic comprehension of ritual practices of neoshamanism. The event was visited by Cecilia Guida, PhD and Professor of the Accademia di Belle Arti di Bologna (Bologna, Italy).

=== Irshansk (Ukraine) ===
Ukraine. On July 19, 2015, is the starting point of an art intervention of Biruchiy contemporary art project, which expanded the geography of its residence. The first art delegation was welcomed by Irshansk (Zhytomyr Oblast), where a two-week project "Irshansk. Recreation" was carried out. The exposition embraced the urban space and natural landscapes. The project is aimed at promoting cultural decentralization of the country: making the culture creating space go out beyond large centers, to medium-sized cities and small towns.

=== Klementowice (Poland) ===
Poland. On June 27, 2016, the geography of Biruchiy project extended to Poland. An offsite residence was created in Klementowice, Lublin Voivodeship, on the basis of the M. Ratay Complex of Agribusiness Schools. For 2 weeks, 14 artists creatively worked on the project "From the common root" (Polish: Od wspólnego korzenia). Its concept is based on the metaphorical meaning of the word "root" (the fundamental principle, basic constituent of the structure) and it is an artistic response to manipulations in reconsidering the history of the two countries. The project was held under the patronage of the Embassy of Ukraine in Poland.

An educational event, called Biruchiy Art School, was held in Klementowice in January 2017 with the participation of students and young artists. The program included a series of lectures and practical work in workshops. The Polish land artist Jarosław Koziara visited the residence to give a lecture.

=== Flux Factory (USA) ===
United States. In 2017, Biruchiy contemporary art project started cooperating with Flux Factory's artist-in-residence program (Long Island City, NYC). It is a platform, created in the 1990s by seven young Brooklyn artists as an alternative to commercial galleries. Within the framework of an exchange program, a couple of artists, Mykyta Kravtsov and his wife, Camille Sagnes Kravtsova, came to New York City. After several months of work, their personal exhibition "Armageddon" was presented in the exhibition space of Flux Factory.

In 2018, according to the exchange program between Flux Factory and Biruchiy project, Anton Lapov came to New York City. The artist realized the 3-hour radio walk "Queens Semantic Ghosts" and audiovisual performance "lap0fvw."

=== Gornji Morinj (Montenegro) ===
Montenegro. On June 17, 2019, an offsite residence started in the mountain town of Gornji Morinj, located in the Bay of Kotor (the Adriatic Sea). The project is a joint initiative of Biruchiy contemporary art project and the Exodus social club. During three weeks, 19 artists and art critics from 5 countries worked on the theme of Exodus. The concept is understood in its biblical meaning, "Exodus," the transition through challenges to a decent and harmonius life.

The reporting exhibition supported by the Ukrainian Cultural Foundation, was held in the halls of the National Museum of Montenegro in Cetinje. The opening took place with the participation of the Embassy of Ukraine in Montenegro. 7 other artists from Bosnia and Herzegovina, Montenegro and Serbia submitted their works for the exhibition. The event was largely covered by the country's leading broadcasting companies: RTCG, TV Vijesti, Prva Srpska Televizija, TV 777, Radio Television Cetinje.

=== Sharhorod (Ukraine) ===
Ukraine. On May 19–31, 2021, the Hava Nagila project (Hebrew: הבה נגילה) was implemented in the historic town of Sharhorod, in Vinnytsia Oblast. The event was attended by 17 artists. Different cultures, languages and traditions intersect in the town, creating a whimsical architectural weaving, which formed the basis of the concept. The video mapping was accompanied by a DJ set by the Kyiv musician Oleg Sokolov. The project took place on the territory of Sharhorod art city.

=== Prymorsk (Ukraine) ===
Ukraine. On September 4, 2021, a project titled Time Not Lost started in Prymorsk, Zaporizhia Oblast (the historical name of the city is Nogaysk). For two weeks, 20 artists from Ukraine, Belarus and Spain worked on the territory of the Rayduga tourist complex. The project was devoted to understanding how time is lost and whether it is lost at all, and how a time loop works. A multimedia exhibition of the participants' works, dedicated to the 200th anniversary of the city, was held on September 17, 2021, on the eve of the symposium closure.

=== Nyzhne Selyshche (Ukraine) ===
Ukraine. Despite the Russian invasion of Ukraine and active hostilities, the residency took place in June 2022. "Biruchiy Transcarpathia 022. Art war" brought together 40 artists from 10 countries (Ukraine, Italy, United States, Austria, United Kingdom, France, Spain, Czech Republic, Denmark, and Poland). The traditional location of the residency moved from the occupied Ukrainian south to Nyzhne Selyshche, Zakarpattia Oblast. The artists considered their mission to be about drawing the world's attention to the ongoing war in Ukraine, with all the inhuman cruelty of war crimes committed there. Exhibitions of the participants' works were held in Oberhausen (Germany), and Warsaw (Poland).

=== Andrzejów (Poland) ===
Poland. On May 3, 2023, a two-week project "Biruchiy Borowiec '433–447'" was initiated in the village of Andrzejów, Masovian Voivodeship. Artists from Ukraine, Poland, and the Czech Republic worked on the local context of the Borowiec area, reflecting on the common past of the countries, finding collective traumas, and fantasizing about their postwar future. "433-447" stands for the days of the full-scale war, during which the art residency was held. An exhibition based on the results of the project was held at the Nadwiślańskie museum in Kazimierz Dolny (Kazimierz Dolny, Poland).

In April–May 2024, a three-week "Lublin Triangle" (Polish: Trójkąt Lubelski) project brought together artists from Lithuania, Poland, and Ukraine, three European countries with a shared history. The project was held under the patronage of the Ambassador of Ukraine to Poland. The exhibition of the participants' works visited institutions in Kazimierz Dolny (Poland; Nadwiślańskie museum) and Vilnius (Lithuania; Vilnius Academy of Arts).

In August 2024, the "Ecology of solidarity" (Polish: Ekologia solidarności) project was held. Ecology was primarily viewed as a system of relationships between people, communities, and the environment. Artistic practices served as a tool for dialogue, enabling a rethinking of the concept of solidarity. The core idea of Biruchiy Borowiec 025 "Hello, Mazurka" (Polish: Hallo, Mazurka) was to create a film made up of 10 short stories, featuring local villagers as its main characters. Varying in tone: lyrical, fantastical, grotesque, and at times unsettling. Each short story unfolds an individual narrative tied to the location, its people, and their memories. Through these fragments of everyday life, the film reveals the broader cultural and historical context of Poland. Following these two projects, exhibitions were held in Kazimierz Dolny and Warsaw.

=== Nontron (France) ===
France. In April 13, 2024, the residency moved to France for 2 weeks, to the Montagenet estate near the town of Nontron in the Nouvelle-Aquitaine region, known for its artisan knife production. The name of the project is "Lima of love." In Morse code, the letter L is represented by the word "Lima;" it is also a military term for a frontier. Thus, the name stands for "Frontier of love." A catalogue was published following the event. The project was supported by the Académie des Beaux-Arts and the Experimental Pole of Arts and Crafts of Nontron.

=== Cortemilia (Italy) ===
Italy. In the summer of 2025, the Italian branch of Biruchiy was established. It is a permanent residency named Biruchiy Cortemilia, located near the town of Cortemilia in the Langhe hills of Piedmont. This location holds symbolic significance, being tied to the early history of the Situationist International. It was here that Asger Jorn and Giuseppe Pinot-Gallizio, key figures of the movement, developed the concept of the "Laboratory of Imaginist Bauhaus," exploring the fusion of art and life through radical, anti-capitalist creativity. Drawing on this anarchic legacy, Biruchiy Cortemilia highlights the transformative power of collective action during times of social and political upheaval.

The residency’s work resulted in the opening of the exhibitions "Holy kitsch" by Viktor Pokydanets (2025) and "Allegro & borscht" by Andriy Bludov and Nataliya Karpinska (2026). In the exhibition context, "Holy kitsch" refers to the fusion of the sacred with the artificial, extravagant style of kitsch.

== Ukrainian wartime posters ==
The "Ukrainian wartime posters" project has been launched since the beginning of the full-scale Russian invasion of Ukraine. It is aimed at drawing the world's attention to Russia's military aggression against Ukraine. The project was initiated in March 2022 with a presentation of Ukrainian anti-war posters at Ogaki poster museum (Ōgaki). Participants: Nastya Gaydaenko, Mykola Goncharov, Zakentiy Gorobyov, Oleksandr Grekhov, Artem Gusev, Kateryna Lisova, Dariya Podoltseva, Oleksiy Say, Mykyta Shylimov, Mykyta Tytov, Albina Yaloza; curator Olena Speranska. The posters were displayed during anti-war protests in New York: on August 7, 2022, in 9 locations in Manhattan; on October 15, 2022, at the Statue of Liberty (involving Oleksiy Golubov, Consul General of Ukraine in New York); on December 17, 2022, in Times Square.

In September 2022, an exhibition tour started on both sides of the Atlantic. Exhibitions in the United States were held across the continent from east to west: at Blue Gallery (New York City), Ent Center for the Arts (University of Colorado Colorado Springs), and the Museum of Tolerance (Los Angeles, along with a pre-premiere screening of the documentary "Freedom on Fire: Ukraine's Fight for Freedom" by Yevgen Afineevsky). In the Old World, the posters were exhibited at 571 Oxford Road Gallery (Reading, Berkshire, United Kingdom), the Kesselhaus in der Kulturbrauerei (Berlin; during the opening of the Ukrainian Institute's office), and the Berliner Theatertreffen theater festival.

Since June 2022, an ongoing series of poster exhibitions in front-line Zaporizhzhia (Ukraine) has been launched in cooperation with the city tourist information center. In 2022 the city streets featured 16 solo exhibitions: Oleksiy Say, Zakentiy Gorobyov, Mykyta Shylimov, Mykola Goncharov, Albina Yaloza, Oleksandr Grekhov, Dariya Podoltseva, Anton Logov, Andriy Yermolenko, Mykyta Tytov, Artem Gusev, Kateryna Lisova, Mykhaylo Skop, Oleksiy Revika, Oleg Gryshchenko, Maksym Palenko. An international exhibition "Art against war" was held in January–February 2023. In 50 posters, 10 artists from Europe expressed their thoughts on the war in Ukraine. The series of posters was created in the lithography workshop of Beaux-Arts de Paris. Before arriving in Zaporizhzhia, the series was displayed at the Palais de Tokyo and the Centre Pompidou in Paris.

A collection of 453 graphic works appeared in the catalog "Wartime posters 2022–2023," published with the assistance of the Ukrainian Cultural Foundation. The collection includes exhibits from 19 exhibitions in Zaporizhzhia, namely 18 solo and 1 group exhibition. The book intended for English-speaking readers was created in Ukraine during the active hostilities. It is a limited edition printed in the capital of Ukraine, Kyiv, during power cuts resulting from the power system being destroyed by Russia's constant missile attacks.

The published edition was presented on both sides of the Atlantic, in Europe and North America. On February 27, 2024, the catalog was unveiled at the Ukrainian House in Warsaw (Poland) which also hosted an exhibition of 87 posters included in the publication. On August 17, 2024, the exhibition and the presentation were held at Hotel Continental – Art Space in Exile in Berlin (Germany).

At the initiative of Nataliya Musienko, Consul General of Ukraine in New York, a catalog presentation was held at the University Club of New York (USA) on July 22, 2024. Forbes military correspondent Mitzi Perdue held a discussion with the catalog compiler Olena Speranska and the Financial Times journalist Christopher Miller, who is the author of the book "The War Came To Us: Life and Death in Ukraine." The panelists discussed Ukraine's cultural decolonization from Russia, the role of artists in the Russian-Ukrainian war, and the evolution of Ukrainian art.

On August 13, 2024, the Consulate General of the Republic of Poland in New York City organized a presentation of the catalog on the territory of the Consulate. Poland's Consul General Mateusz Sakowicz greeted the participants. The meeting was moderated by Katya Soldak, editorial director for Forbes Media's international editions. The exhibition accompanying the presentation featured posters by 10 Polish artists: Andrzej Milewski (Andrzej Rysuje), Aleksander Małachowski (Hashtagalek), Bartłomiej Kiełbowicz, Hanna Kmieć, Jakub Jezierski, Marta Frej, Matylda Damięcka, Max Skorwider, Patryk Sroczyński, and Paweł Jońca.

To mark the 4th anniversary of the full-scale Russian invasion of Ukraine, a large-scale, two-month exhibition featuring 309 works by 42 artists from Ukraine, Poland, and France titled "Ukraine wartime posters, 2022–2025: the way of resistance" opened at the Clifford Art Gallery at Colgate University (Hamilton, USA). As part of the project, curator Olena Speranska delivered a lecture to students titled "The power of the image: trauma, art and counter-propaganda." Oleksandra Matviichuk, head of the Nobel Peace Prize–winning Center for Civil Liberties, also delivered an address.

== Name ==
The word Biruchiy is a neologism, a modified version of the name of the Biryuchyi spit. The neologism was created in the 2000s by the founders of the project as a reflection of contemporary artists' creative approach to the word formation process.

The newly created brand "Biruchiy" is subject to copyright.

== The project themes ==
=== The main residence ===
Year	Title	Theme	Curators
2006	The 1st Biruchiy contemporary art project 006	Landscape for a hero	Volodymyr Gulich
2007	The 2nd Biruchiy contemporary art project 007	Hippies exist	Volodymyr Gulich
2008	The 3rd Biruchiy contemporary art project 008	Who are you?	Volodymyr Gulich
2009	The 4th Biruchiy contemporary art project 009	As an alternative	Volodymyr Gulich
2010	The 5th season of Biruchiy contemporary art project 010	A new person	Volodymyr Gulich
2011	The 6th season of Biruchiy contemporary art project 011	Biruchiy variations	–
2012	The 7th season of Biruchiy contemporary art project 012	The fourth dimension	Mariya Khrushchak
2013	The 8th season of Biruchiy contemporary art project 013	The habitable zone	Sergiy Kantsedal, Nataliya Matsenko
2014	The 9th season of Biruchiy contemporary art project 014	Biruchiy 8,5; No title	Sergiy Bratkov, Volodymyr Gulich, Sergiy Kantsedal, Nataliya Matsenko
2015	The 10th season of Biruchiy contemporary art project 015	EcoBiruchiy; Biruchiy 10×15	Lyzaveta German, Mariya Lanko, Irina Leifer, Nataliya Matsenko, Massimo Melotti, Yanina Prudenko
2016	The 11th season of Biruchiy contemporary art project 016	No title	Sergiy Bratkov, Lelya Goldsteyn, Sergiy Kantsedal, Mariya Khrushchak
2017	The 12th season of Biruchiy contemporary art project 017	Biruchiy May 017; Run on the water...	Sergiy Kantsedal, Nataliya Matsenko
2018	The 13th season of Biruchiy contemporary art project 018	Biruchiy 018 or Neoshamanism. Ritual power	Nataliya Filonenko

Project commissioner Gennadiy Kozub (since 2006). Director Olena Speranska (since 2016).

=== Offsite residences ===
Year	Country	City	Theme	Curators	Commissioner
2015	Ukraine	Irshansk	Irshansk. Recreation	Nataliya Matsenko	Gennadiy Kozub
2016	Poland	Klementowice	From the common root	Nataliya Matsenko	Gennadiy Kozub
2017	Poland	Klementowice	Biruchiy Art School	Lelya Goldsteyn, Mariya Khrushchak	Gennadiy Kozub
2019	Montenegro	Gornji Morinj	The 14th season of Biruchiy contemporary art project 019; Exodus. Biruchiy 019. Montenegro	Kostyantyn Doroshenko	Petar Ćuković
2021	Ukraine	Sharhorod	Hava Nagila		Gennadiy Kozub
2021	Ukraine	Prymorsk	The 15th season of Biruchiy contemporary art project 021; Time not lost	Kostyantyn Doroshenko	Gennadiy Kozub
2022	Ukraine	Nyzhne Selyshche	The 16th season of Biruchiy contemporary art project 022; Biruchiy Transcarpathia 022. Art war		Gennadiy Kozub
2023	Poland	Andrzejów	The 17th season of Biruchiy contemporary art project 023; Biruchiy Borowiec "433-447"		Gennadiy Kozub
2024	France	Nontron	Lima of love	Ksenia Ulianova, Olena Speranska	Gennadiy Kozub
2024	Poland	Andrzejów	Lublin Triangle	Irma Balakauskaitė, Julia Harasimowicz, Nataliya Matsenko, Olena Speranska	Gennadiy Kozub
2024	Poland	Andrzejów	The 18th season of Biruchiy contemporary art project 024; Ecology of solidarity	Mariya Vtorushyna	Gennadiy Kozub
2025	Poland	Andrzejów	The 19th season of Biruchiy contemporary art project 025; Biruchiy Borowiec 025 "Hallo, Mazurka"	Sergiy Bratkov	Gennadiy Kozub

== Participants ==
Ukraine

- Yegor Antsygin, Inara Bagirova, Olga Berezyuk, Kateryna Berlova, Nazar Bilyk, Andriy Bludov, Andriy Boyko, Kateryna Buchatska, Volodymyr Budnikov, Anastasiya Budnikova, Mykhaylo Buksha, Mykhaylo Deyak, Danylo Galkin, Olga Gaydash, Lyzaveta German, Anna Gidora, Oleksandr Glyadelov, Kseniya Gnylytska, Mykola Goncharov, Zakentiy Gorobyov, Illya Isupov, Dobrynya Ivanov, Zhanna Kadyrova, Nataliya Karpinska, Lesya Khomenko, Sergiy Klepach, Alina Kleytman, Dariya Koltsova, Gennadiy Kozub, Vitaliy Kravets, Yuri Kruchak, Valeriy Kumanovsky, Mariya Lanko, Iryna Lastovkina, Mariya Leonenko, Kateryna Libkind, Andriy Lobov, Anton Logov, Maksym Mamsykov, Oleksa Mann, Anna Myronova, Alyona Naumenko, Viktoriya Perevoznikova, Yuri Pikul, Viktor Pokydanets, Sonya Pomogaybo, Kyrylo Protsenko, Karyna Pustovalova, Vlada Ralko, Svitlana Ratoshnyuk, Oleksandr Roytburd, Denys Ruban, Ivan Sautkin, Oleksiy Say, Polina Shcherbyna, Elmira Shemsedynova, Vladyslav Shereshevsky, Andriy Siguntsov, Stanislav Sylantyev, Gnat Solomko, Yuri Solomko, Anna Sorokova, Vasil Tatarsky, Valeriya Trubina, Anna Valieva, Marta Vashchuk, Myroslav Vayda, Matviy Vaysberg, Petro Vladimirov, Mariya Vtorushyna, Glib Vysheslavsky, Alina Yakubenko, Yuri Yefanov, Anzhelika Yefanova, Andriy Zelinsky, Oleksandr Zhyvotkov, Oleksiy Zinchenko, Ujif_notfound /Georgiy Potopalsky/, GAZ group /Vasil Grublyak, Oleksiy Zolotaryov/ (Kyiv).
- Mykyta Shylimov, Volodymyr Yakovets (Cherkasy).
- Mykyta Shalenniy (Dnipropetrovsk).
- Anatoliy Tatarenko (Donetsk).
- Irina Antonyuk, Vasyl Antonyuk, Sergiy Bratkov, Vitaliy Kokhan, Yevgeniya Laptiy, Tetyana Malynovska, Roman Mykhaylov, Roman Minin, Olena Polyashchenko, Andriy Rachinsky, Danylo Revkovsky, Oksana Solop, Larysa Stadnyk, Andriy Stogniy, Ivan Svitlychniy, Anton Tkachenko, Artem Volokitin, Oleksiy Yalovega, Oleg Drozdov's architectural workshop /Oleg Drozdov, Bogdan Volynsky, Sergiy Kostyaniy, Vitaliy Pravyk/, Sviter group /Lera Polyanskova, Maksym Robotov/ (Kharkiv).
- Nataliya Blok, Yulia Danylevska, Vyacheslav Mashnytsky, Totem group /Stas Volyazlovsky/ (Kherson).
- Yevgen Koroletov (Luhansk).
- Yuri Biley, Pavlo Kovach, Yuri Koval, Viktor Lavniy, Oleksandr Matvienko, Stanislav Turina, Anton Varga, Sergiy Yakunin (Lviv).
- Inna Bobrova, Yakiv Bulavytsky, Andriy Chepurko, Oleksiy Markitan, Rustam Mirzoev, Yulia Mirzoeva, Dmytro Moldavanov, Taras Zaviruykha (Mykolaiv).
- Oleksiy Chepygin, Dmytro Dulfan, Ivan Golmov, Ihor Gusev, Mykola Karabinovich, Stepan Ryabchenko, Nata Trandafir, Albina Yaloza, Apl315 (Odesa).
- Oleksandr Shirokov (Sevastopol).
- Anna Bekerska (Simferopol).
- Sergiy Dubovets, Vadim Kharabaruk, Mykhaylo Khodanych, Ivan Nebesnyk, Oleg Putrashyk, Robert Saller, Nataliya Shevchenko, Andriy Stegura, Nataliya Tartay, Ruslan Tremba (Uzhgorod).
- Anna Bykova, Andriy Orlov, Anastasia Skorikova (Yalta).
- Marta Berezhnenko, Volodymyr Borodin, Yevgen Kompaneychenko, Olga Kyrychenko, Vsevolod Medvedev, Gennadiy Nikitin, Dmytro Tsipunov, Zheton group /Yevgen Fomenko, Anton Lisikov/ (Zaporizhzhia).
- Art zebs group /Volodymyr Gulich, Nastya Loyko, VJ Yarkus/ (Yalta, Zaporizhzhia).
- Critical Archiving Laboratory /Anton Lapov, Larion Lozoviy/ (Kyiv, Luhansk).
- mediaklub group /Anna Ivchenko, Dariya Mayer, Maksym Robotov, Oleksandr Sirous, Dmytro Tentyuk/ (Kyiv, Kharkiv).
- Natsprom group /Oleg Tistol, Mykola Matsenko/ (Kyiv, Cherkasy).
- Seksualni alkogoliky group.
- Syny Morya group (Sons of the Sea group) /Illya Isupov, Oleksandr Matvienko, Marsel Onysko, Andriy Stegura/ (Kyiv, Lviv, Uzhgorod).

Ukraine / Netherlands – Open Group (Vidkryta grupa) /Arthur van Beek, Yuri Biley, Jesper Buursinkk, Lyzaveta German, Sergiy Klepach, Pavlo Kovach, Valeriy Kumanovsky, Mariya Lanko, Irina Leifer, Stanislav Turina, Anton Varga/ (Kyiv, Lviv, Amsterdam).

Australia – Jason Fidler (Brisbane).

Austria – Anna Ermolaeva, Scott Evans, Rita Novak (Vienna), Yulia Belyaeva (Linz).

Belarus – Syargey Kirushchanka, Aleksey Kuzmich, Aleksey Lunyov (Minsk).

Bosnia and Herzegovina – Jusuf Hadžifejzović (Sarajevo).

Canada – Nataliya Filonenko (Vancouver).

Czech Republic – Alice Nikitinová, Magdaléna Nováková, Jan Zdvořák (Prague), Pavla Nikitina, Jiří Pec (Brno).

Denmark – Sergiy Svyatchenko (Copenhagen).

France – Sandy Brishler, Mykyta Kravtsov, Tymur Pustoviy, Camille Sagnes, Tetyana Tytova (Paris), Diana Faksh (Cergy-Pontoise).

Germany – Mitya Churikov, Igor Zaidel (Berlin).

Israel – Vladimir Brodetsky (Tel Aviv).

Italy – Nadiya Polevych (Rome), Mariya Proshkovska (Bologna), Gabriele Abbruzzese (Catania), Cecilia Guida, Micol Roubini (Milan), lucrezia Decai (Naples), Franco Ariaudo, Giorgio Cugno, Valerio Manghi, Nataliya Polunina, Alessandro Sciaraffa,Gianluca de Serio, Massimiliano de Serio (Turin).

Kazakhstan – Bulat Gelman (Almaty).

Lithuania – Irma Balakauskaitė, Jurga Barilaitė, Vaiva Monika Lanskoronskytė, Evelina Paukštytė (Vilnius), Vidas Poškus (Alytus), Vaiva Koveraitė-Trumpė (Šiauliai).

Montenegro – Vlatka Vujošević (Podgorica), Matviy Krylov (Herceg Novi).

Netherlands – Arthur van Beek, Jesper Buursinkk, Irina Leifer (Amsterdam).

Poland – Karolina Mełnicka, Tomasz Partyka, Stachu Szumski, Ana Vostruchovaitė (Warsaw), Barbara Gryka (Lublin), Błażej Rusin (Poznań).

Russia – Vladimir Arkhypov, Victoria Begalskaya, Dmitry Bulnygin, Yulia Gnirenko, Rada Ivanova, Boris Kashapov, Arkady Nasonov, Maximilian Roganov, Yuri Shabelnikov, PG artistic group and artistic groups of the Rodchenko Moscow School of Photography and Multimedia /Dariya Baribina, Anna Brandush, Yegor Fedorichev, Dmitry Fedorov, Svetlana Isayeva, Zinaida Isupova, Vadim Kolosov, Nataliya Kononova, Aleksandr Merekin, Ekaterina Muromtseva, Polina Muzyko, Dmitriy Starusev, Denis Tikhomirov, Oleg Ustinov, Andrew Zhandarov/ (Moscow), Tatiana Polyashchenko (Novorossiysk), Nataliya Yudina (Tomsk).

Spain – Xavier Escala, Nina Murashkina (Barcelona, Catalonia).

Switzerland – Ronald Ross.

United Kingdom – Jamie Fitzpatrick, Pavlo Kerestey (London).

United States – Clemens Poole (New York City), Mariya Pasichnyk (Scottsdale, Arizona).

== Promotion ==
=== Art events ===
Expositions of Biruchiy works were held in Ukraine: in Zaporizhzhia (since 2006), Kyiv (since 2011), Koktebel (2013), Kharkiv (2014), Lviv (2018), Melitopol (2018, 2021), Khmelnytskyi (2019). Art events also take place in other countries: Montreal (Canada, 2013), Cetinje (Montenegro, 2019). The project was presented at the contemporary art fair Artissima (Turin, Italy, 2017).

Presentations of publications are held. Biruchiy project includes lectures and master classes by contemporary art stars, presentations of young artists' works, concerts and DJ sets.

In August 2025, the Biruchiy Art Centre opened in Zaporizhzhia.

=== Publishing activities ===
The catalogs of the project are regularly published (10 catalogues by 2019).

Biruchiy contemporary art magazine (certificate of incorporation KB 2104510845P dated 7 November 2014) was issued in 2014–2015. Published on a quarterly basis, 5 issues published. Its editor-in-chief is Gennadiy Kozub. It is a full-color periodical of 68–104 pages, published in Russian and Ukrainian, having a run of 5000 copies, covering contemporary art. The magazine published interviews and comments of renowned art critics, collectors and artists, reviews of exhibitions and projects.

3 CDs were released in 2012–2015. The CD, arranged by DJ Mishukov, included 11 music tracks from Biruchiy 012 (Biruchiy M Sound Lab). The first and the third releases of Cocktail Spirit by Oleg Sokolov and Sergiy Kodatsky also came out.

== Gallery ==
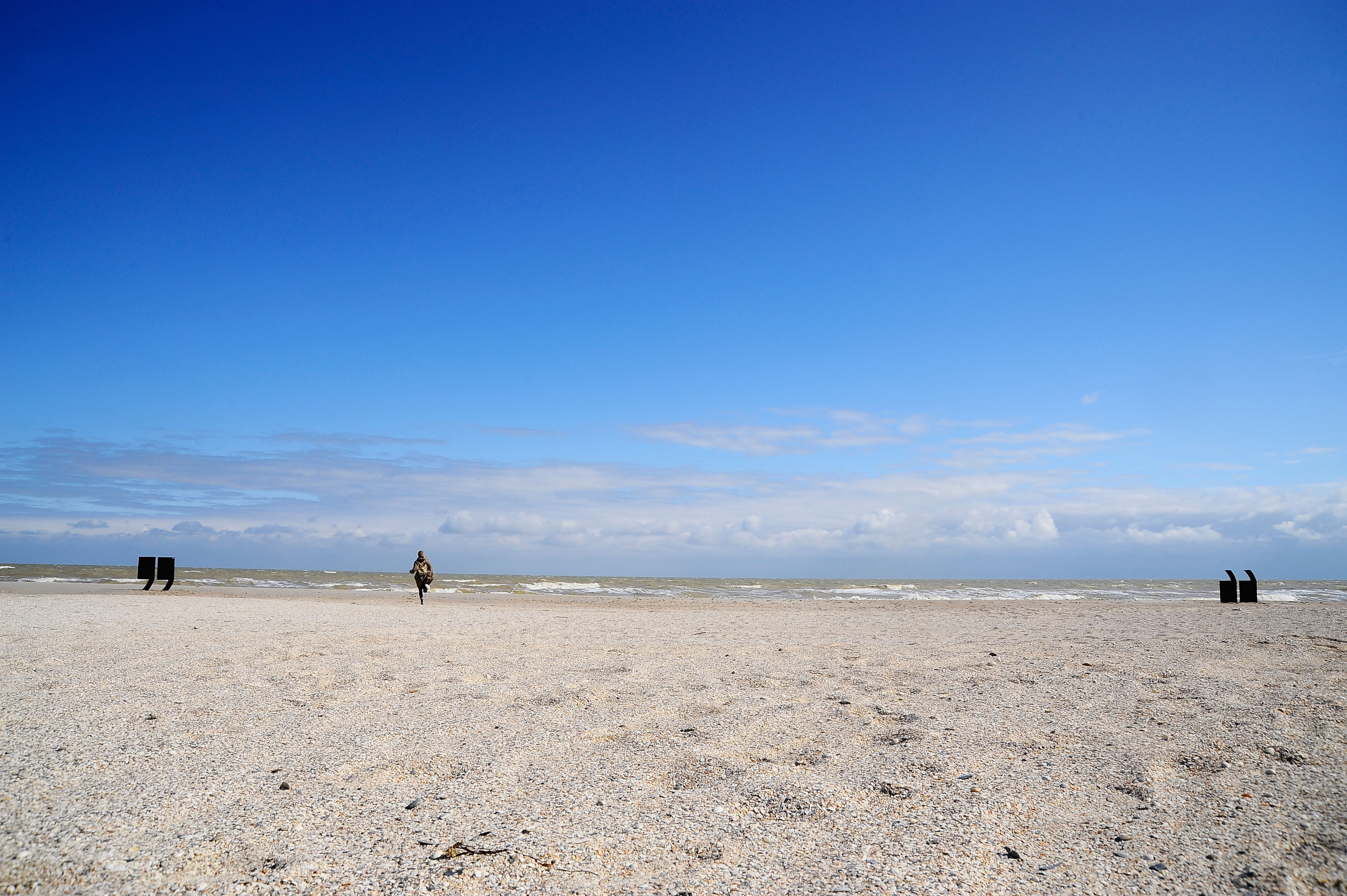
Nazar Bilyk. "Quotation mark." Metal. 2014.

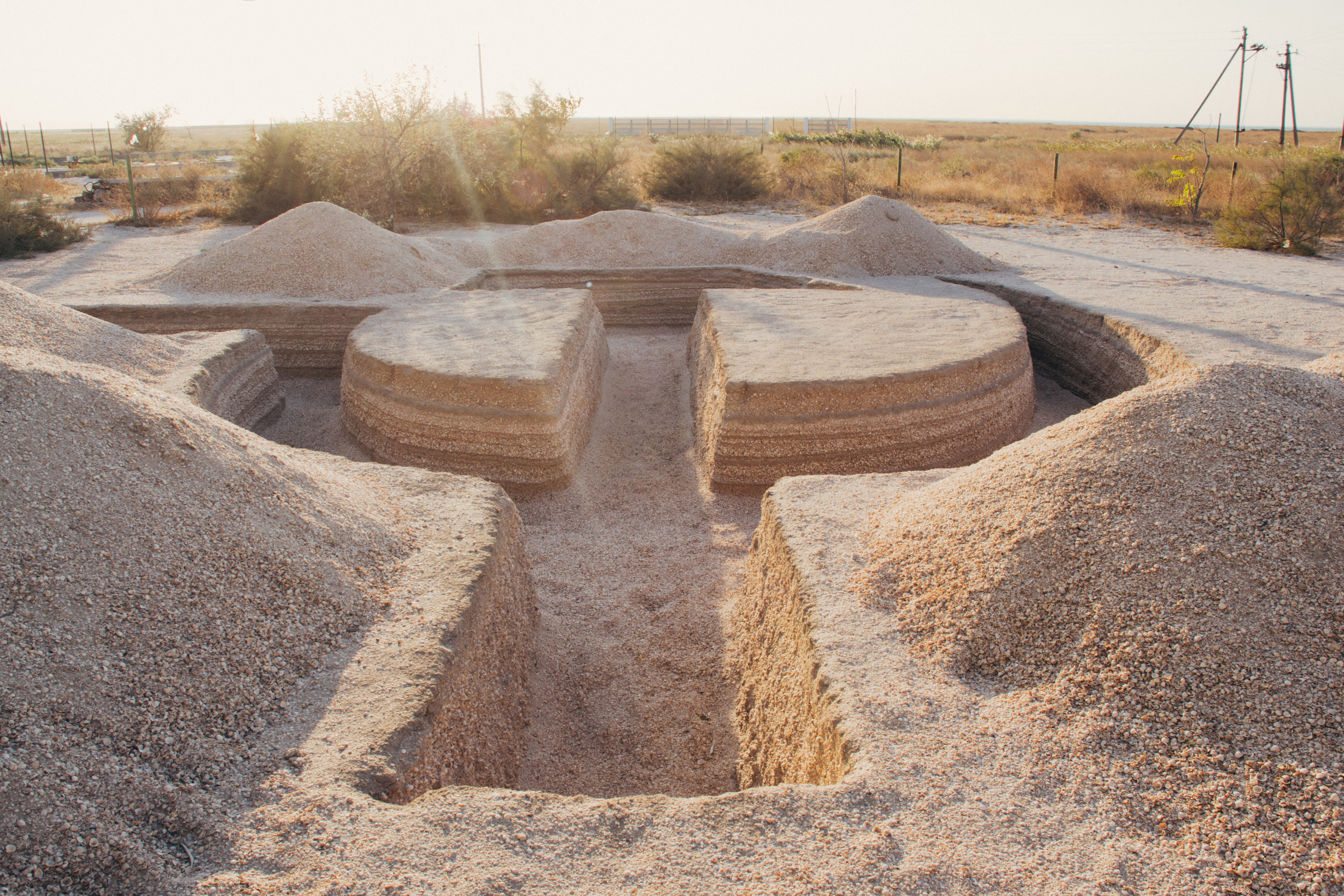
Yuri Shabelnikov. "New archaeology." Sand. 2014.

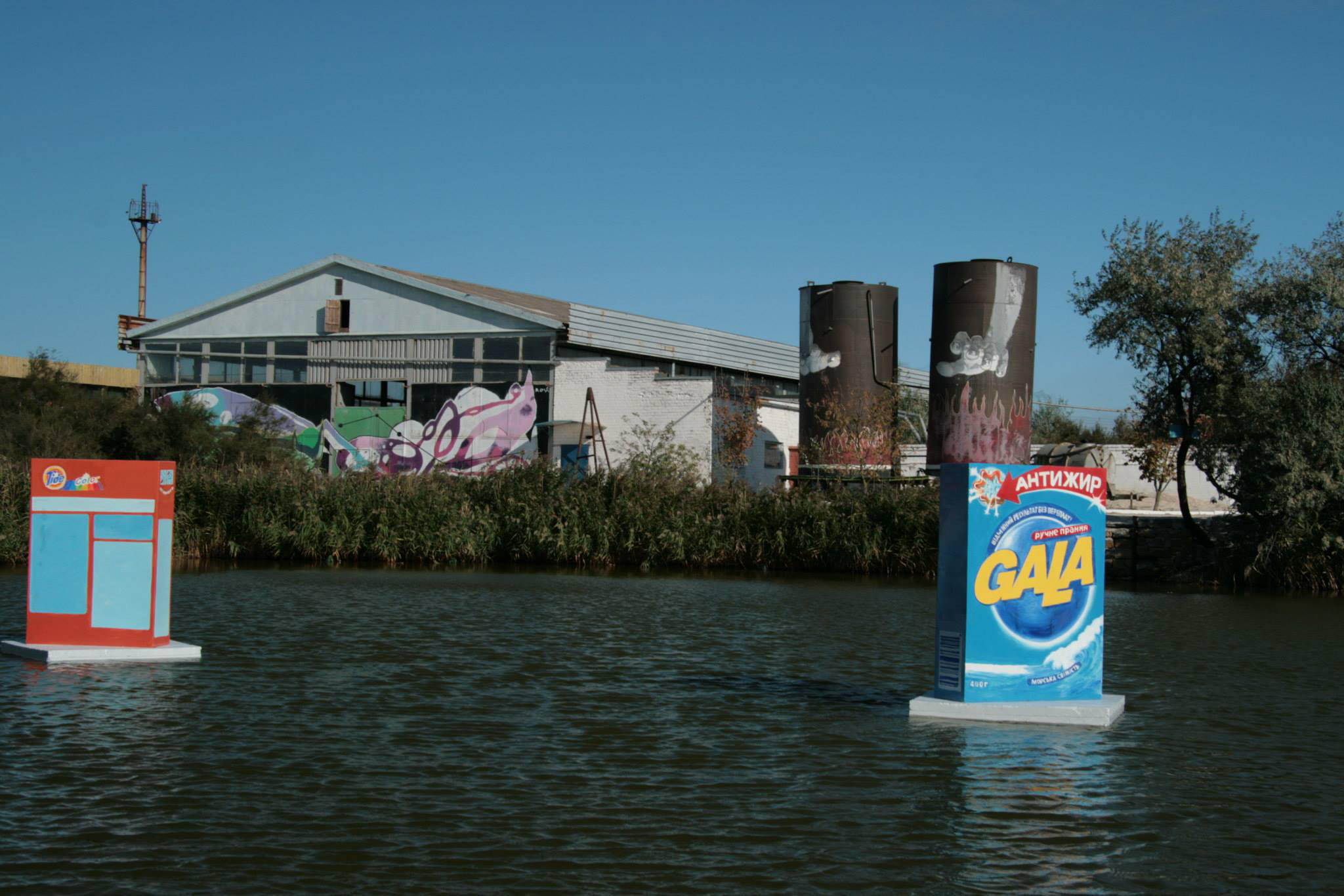
Artists' works in Biruchiy residence.

== Publications of the project ==
=== Catalogues ===
1. Бирючий 006. [Запорожье, 2007]. [48] с. (in Russian)
2. 2 Международный симпозиум современного искусства «Бирючий 007» или «Хиппи Е». 7.09 – 16.09 2007 г.. [Запорожье, 2008]. [52] с. (in Russian)
3. Третий Международный симпозиум современного искусства «Бирючий 008». «Хто ти Е», 4.09 – 13.09 2008. [Запорожье, 2008]. [48] с. (in Russian)
4. Biruchiy 009. Contemporary art. [Запорожье, 2009]. [52] с. (in Russian)
5. Biruchiy 012. Contemporary art project. As a part of Art Kyiv Contemporary 2012. Kyiv, November 1–18, 2012. [Kyiv] : Art Publishing Studio, 2012. 188 p. (in Russian and English)
6. Biruchiy contemporary art project 013. The habitable zone. [Kyiv : Art Print Studio, 2013]. 224 p. (in Russian and English)
7. Biruchiy contemporary art project 014 / comp. of the catalogue S. Kantsedal, N. Matsenko, G. Kozub. [Kyiv : Huss, 2015]. 254 p. (in Ukrainian and English)
8. Biruchiy contemporary art project 015 / cataloger N. Matsenko. [Kyiv : Huss, 2016]. 342 p. (in Ukrainian and English)
9. Biruchiy contemporary art project 018. Neoshamanism. Ritual power / cataloger O. Speranska. [Kyiv : Huss, 2018]. 173 p. (in Ukrainian and English)
10. Wartime posters 2022–2023 / author and book compiler O. Speranska. Zaporizhzhia : [Huss, 2023]. 464 p. ISBN 978-617-8030-50-6. (in Ukrainian and English)
11. Lima of love : Biruchiy Nontron 024. [No place, 2024]. [64] p. (in English, French, and Ukrainian)

=== Magazine ===
1. Biruchiy contemporary art project. 2014 / ed.-in-chief G. Kozub. Kyiv : Best Solutions Ltd, 2014. No. 0. 68 p. (in Ukrainian, Russian, and English)
2. Biruchiy contemporary art magazine / ed.-in-chief G. Kozub. Kyiv : Best Solutions Ltd, 2014. No. 1. 104 p. (in Ukrainian, Russian, and English)
3. Biruchiy contemporary art magazine / ed.-in-chief G. Kozub. Kyiv : Best Solutions Ltd, 2015. No. 1 (3). 76 p. (in Ukrainian, Russian, and English)

=== Discography ===
1. Biruchiy M Sound Lab 2012 / comp. and mix by DJ Mishukoff. 80 Min / 700 Mb. [Kyiv] : Biruchiy contemporary art project, [2012]. 1 CD; 12 cm. (in English and Russian)
2. Sokolov & Kodatsky. Cocktail spirit. 80 Min / 700 Mb. [Kyiv] : Biruchiy contemporary art project, [2013]. [Vol. 1] : Xenta absenta. 1 CD; 12 cm.
3. DJ Oleg Sokolov & DJ Kodatsky. Cocktail spirit / comp. & mixed March 2015; for promotion only; fragment of pict. by Y. Pikul. 80 Min / 700 Mb. [Kyiv] : Biruchiy contemporary art project, [2015]. Vol. 3. 1 CD; 12 cm.

== Literature ==
=== Book editions ===
1. Ariaudo, F. Basilisk or how to run on water. [Turin] : Viaindustriae publishing; Colli publishing platform, [2018]. 144 p. ISBN 978-88-97753-46-9. (in Italian, English, and Russian)

=== Periodicals ===
1. Boczkar, O. W Polsce ukraińscy artyści poszukiwali wspólnych korzeni // Słowo Polskie (Winnica). Nr 8 (49). Sierpień 2016. S. 18. (in Polish)
2. Matsenko, N. "Od wspólnego korzenia" // Dziennik Kijowski. Nr 14 (525). Sierpień 2016. S. 7. (in Polish)
3. Przegląd prasy polskiej na Ukrainie: "Od wspólnego korzenia" / opracował Krzysztof Szymański // Kurier Galicyjski (Lwów). Nr 16 (260). 30 sierpnia – 15 września 2016. S. 10. (in Polish)
4. UNIDEE Notebooks 2017. No. 13 : Residency programme for international artists. UNIDEE – University of Ideas (Biella). 2014–2017. P. 1, 4–9, 48, 70–77.
