= Gennadiy Kozub =

- Геннадій Козуб
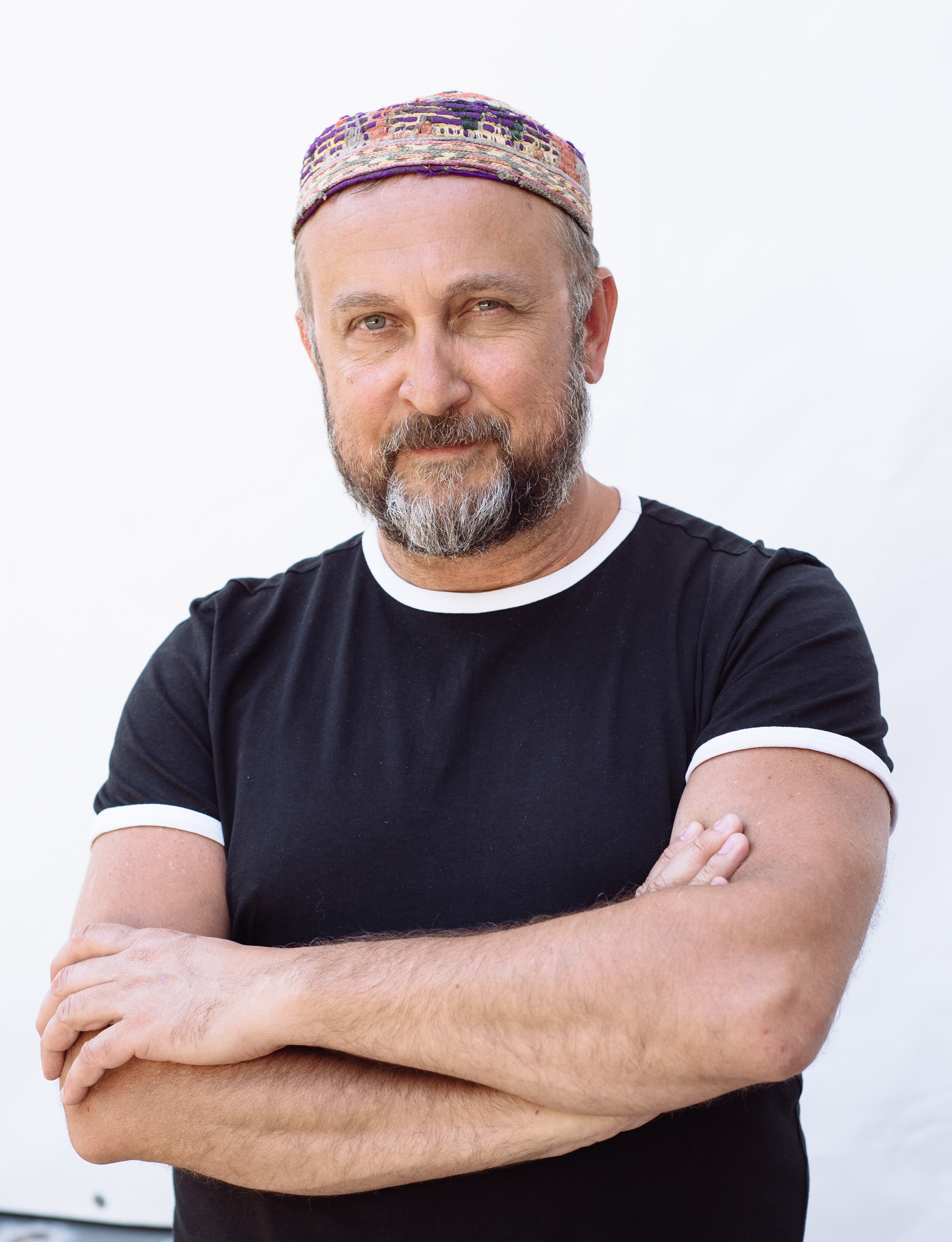
- Born: 3 July 1969 (age 57); Zaporizhzhia, Ukraine
- Education: Zaporizhzhia National Technical University
- Occupations: Art Production Manager; Publisher; Art collector; Gallerist; Artist
- Known for: CEO & co-founder: Biruchiy contemporary art project; CEO & co-founder: Association of Contemporary Art Researchers; Editor-in-chief & founder: Biruchiy contemporary art magazine; Co-founder: All-Ukrainian Bartenders Association; Owner: Art Zebs gallery
- Website: biruchiyart.com.ua

Gennadiy Kozub (Ukrainian: Геннадій Козуб, pronounced [ɦeˈnːɑd⁽ʲ⁾ij koˈzub]; born 3 July 1969) is an art production manager, publisher, art collector, gallery owner, and artist. He is a co-founder and organizer of the leading contemporary art residence in Ukraine – Biruchiy contemporary art project (2006). A CEO and co-founder of the Association of Contemporary Art Researchers (2008), the owner of the Art Zebs gallery (2008), editor-in-chief and founder of Biruchiy contemporary art magazine (2014).

Co-founder of the All-Ukrainian Bartenders Association (2001) – a national organization of the International Bartenders Association. He is also a juror of all-Ukrainian bartender competitions.

== Biography ==
Gennadiy Kozub finished Zaporizhzhia school No. 53 (1976–1986), served in the army (1988–1990). He graduated from Zaporizhzhia National Technical University (2004, transport technologies faculty). He has been a resident of Kyiv since 2013.

=== Career ===
In the early 1990s Kozub worked at a representative office of Maruni brand in Ukraine (Zaporizhzhia; the founder). In 1999 he became a co-owner of Billy Bones restaurant in Zaporizhzhia, which lasted eleven years. In 2001 he became the vice-president of the All-Ukrainian Bartenders Association. In 2008 he became vice president of the Association of Contemporary Art Researchers. He became president of the association in 2019. He took ownership of Art Zebs gallery 2008 until 2009 in Zaporizhzhia. From 2014 to 2015 he was the editor-in-chief of Biruchiy contemporary art magazine.

== Activity ==
=== Art production management ===
In autumn 2006, Kozub became a co-founder of the Biruchiy contemporary art project on Byriuchyi Island spit in the Sea of Azov. While Kozub was the project commissioner, and Volodymyr Gulich the art director.

Since the project's foundation, Kozub has organized it in the main residence (Byriuchyi Island, since 2006; 14 seasons, 208 artists, 11 art groups, 16 countries); in offsite residences in Ukraine (Irshansk, Zhytomyr Oblast, 2015) and Poland (Klementowice, Lublin Voivodeship, 2016–2017); exchanging participants with art residences in Italy (Biella, 2013–2017) and the United States (New York City, 2017–2018); shooting films by Italian directors on Byriuchyi Island (2015–2016); project exhibitions in Ukraine (Zaporizhzhia, Kyiv, Koktebel, Kharkiv, Lviv, Melitopol, Khmelnytskyi; since 2006), Canada (Montreal, 2013) and Italy (Turin, 2017).

Owing to Kozub's organizational participation, the ethno-electronic festival Biruchiy Fest (2016), the educational event Biruchiy Art School (Poland, 2017) were held.

=== Publishing activity ===
Kozub published 10 catalogs of the project (2006–2019). He organized the publication of Biruchiy contemporary art magazine (2014–2015, 5 issues).

=== Art collection ===
Since the early 1990s, Kozub has been collecting art objects. He is at the 29th place in the rating of collectors of Ukrainian contemporary art according to Forbes Ukraine magazine. His collection contains about 100 works (in 2015): painting, graphic arts, sculpture, and photography.

The artworks were presented at a retrospective exhibition dedicated to the tenth anniversary of the Biruchiy contemporary art project in Kyiv in 2015.

=== Creative activities ===
Painting, graphic arts, art objects, photography are among Kozub's main interests. His works present the author's ironic reflection on current problems of our time.

Participated in the international art project "Joseph Beuys' kids" (Crimea–Kyiv–Lviv–Lublin–Khortytsia, 2004–2005). He also participated in group exhibitions in Kyiv (2014), Odesa (2014), Geneva (2015). His paintings presented in Artvera's Geneva gallery, were reproduced by such periodicals as the Ukrayinska Pravda, the Kyiv Post, Komsomolskaya Pravda in Ukraine.

The works are kept in private collections in Ukraine, Russia, Germany, Switzerland, Canada, USA, and Japan.

== Articles ==
- Kozub, G. [Word of the editor-in-chief] // Biruchiy contemporary art magazine. 2014. No. 1. P. 2.
- Kozub, G. You need training to understand contemporary art // Biruchiy contemporary art magazine. 2015. No. 1 (3). P. 2.
- Kozub, G., Speranska, O. Real or fabled // Biruchiy contemporary art project 018. Neoshamanism. Ritual power. [Kyiv : Huss, 2018]. P. 24–25.

== Interview ==
- Esterkina, I. Gennadiy Kozub: Walking barefoot in the sand ("Who are you?" "Biruchiy 008"). Mig Po Vykhodnym. 29 August 2008. (in Russian)
- Syrchina, M. "It is not only in your country that you are unique. There is no such thing even in Europe". Fakty i Kommentarii. 11 January 2014. (in Russian)
- Rublevska, R. Gennadiy Kozub: "The purpose of Biruchiy remains unchanged: the exchange of creative energy, knowledge and experience". Art Ukraine. 26 July 2016. (in Russian)
- Ference, L., Slavinska, I. Byriuchyi Island: the space of freedom for artists. Hromadske Radio. 13 December 2016. (in Ukrainian)
