= Kozub (surname) =

Kozub is a surname. Notable people with this surname include:

- Ernst Kozub (1924–1971), German opera singer
- Gennadiy Kozub (born 1969), Ukrainian art collector
- Łukasz Kozub (born 1997), Polish volleyball player
- Nik Kozub, Canadian musician
- Wojciech Kozub (born 1976), Polish biathlete
