= Cittadellarte =

Cittadellarte is an art and creativity laboratory founded in 1998 by the artist Michelangelo Pistoletto in a disused textile mill by the river Cervo in Biella, Italy.
