= Andrzejów, Zwoleń County =

Andrzejów
- Village
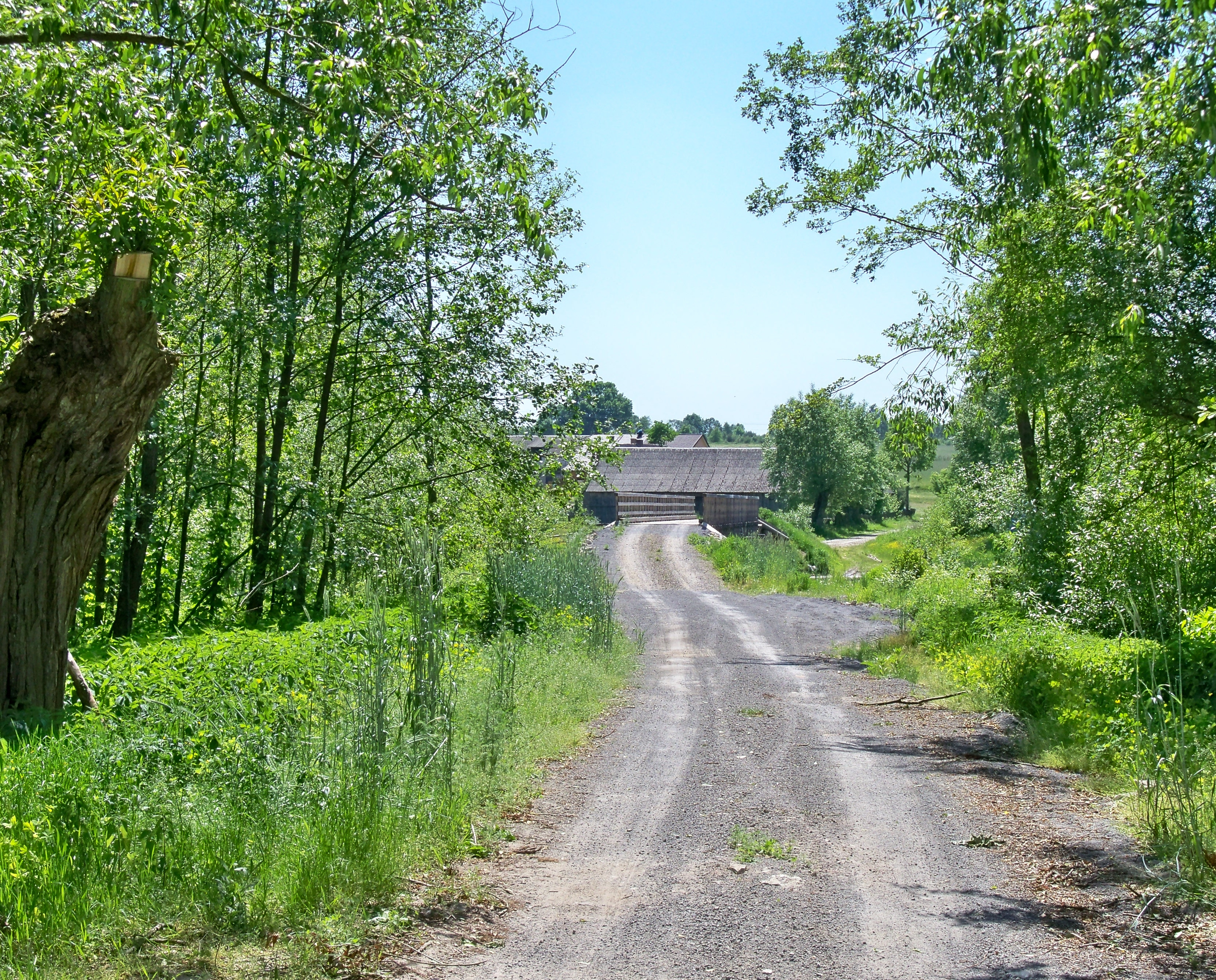

- Location within Poland
- Coordinates: 51°17′14″N 21°45′17″E
- Country: Poland
- Voivodeship: Masovian
- County: Zwoleń
- Gmina: Przyłęk

Andrzejów [anˈdʐɛjuf] is a village in the administrative district of Gmina Przyłęk, within Zwoleń County, Masovian Voivodeship, in east-central Poland.
