= Byriuchyi Island =

Coordinates: 46.133°N 35.092°E

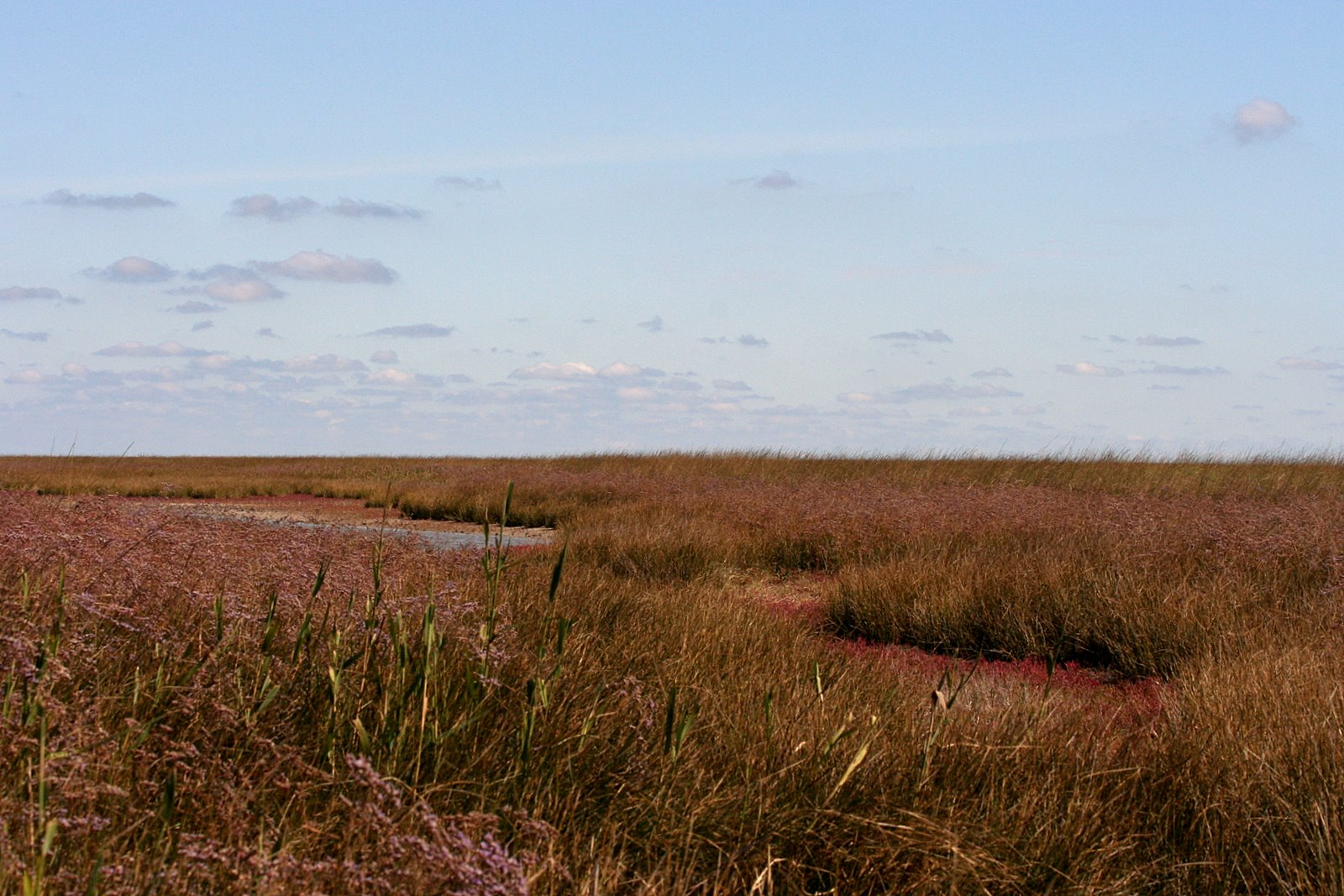
Typical landscape of Byriuchyi Island

Byriuchyi Island (Ukrainian: Бирючий Острів [bɪˈrʲutʃɪj ˈɔst⁽ʲ⁾r⁽ʲ⁾iu̯]) is a spit in the northwestern part of the Azov Sea, expanded southern part of the Fedotova Spit. Together with the narrow northern part of the Fedotova Spit, Byriuchyi Island forms the Utljuk Lyman separating it from the sea from the east. Until 1929, the current Spit was an island, separated from the northern part of the Fedotova Spit by a narrow strait.

It belongs to Kherson Oblast of Ukraine. It has no direct land connection with the main territory of the Oblast — they are separated by the Utljuk Lyman.

Its length is about 11 nautical miles, the width is about 3 nautical miles, and its area is 27.92 square miles. On the northwestern and western shores of the Spit, there are several shallow bays and estuaries. Small vessels most often enter the bays of the southwestern edge of the Spit (Rybatska and Mayachna bays). Along the western and northwestern shore of the Spit, there is a large shoal, which is less than 5 meters deep.

== Nature ==
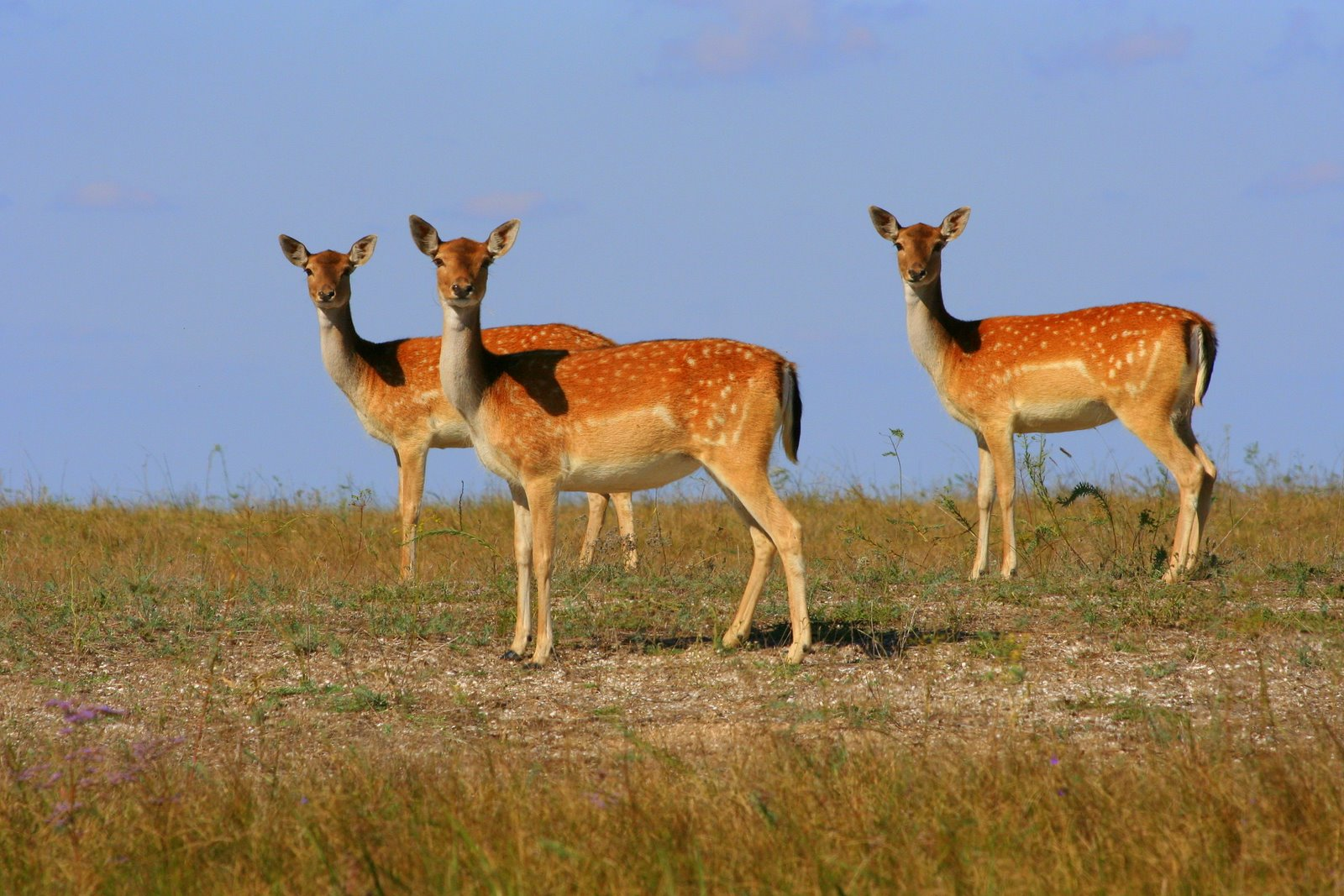
Female fallow deer on Byriuchyi Island

The spit is of alluvial type, formed of sand and coquina (sandy coastal plain with occurring shell bars). Along the coast, there are numerous lakes. Several small saline lakes and a large lake, Lake Olen, extend along the northern shore.

There are meadow, coastal water and sand-steppe landscapes. The flora includes about 700 species of plants. In the 1970s–1980s, on the area of 232 hectares, there were planted shelter forests, consisting of Elaeagnus angustifolia, Ulmus laevis, Robinia pseudoacacia and Fraxinus excelsior. It is a habitat for about a thousand acclimatized red deer, 2500 fallow deer, 90 onagers and several dozen domestic horses and moufflons; acclimatized birds are pheasants.

== History ==
In the first millennium BC, the vicinity of Byriuchyi Island was inhabited by the Royal Scythians. Probably, this was the very spit depicted on some Scythian coins.

On 17 September 2003, a meeting between Ukrainian President Leonid Kuchma and President of Russia Vladimir Putin took place here. During the meeting, they discussed the issue of the sea border in the waters of the Azov Sea and the Kerch Strait.

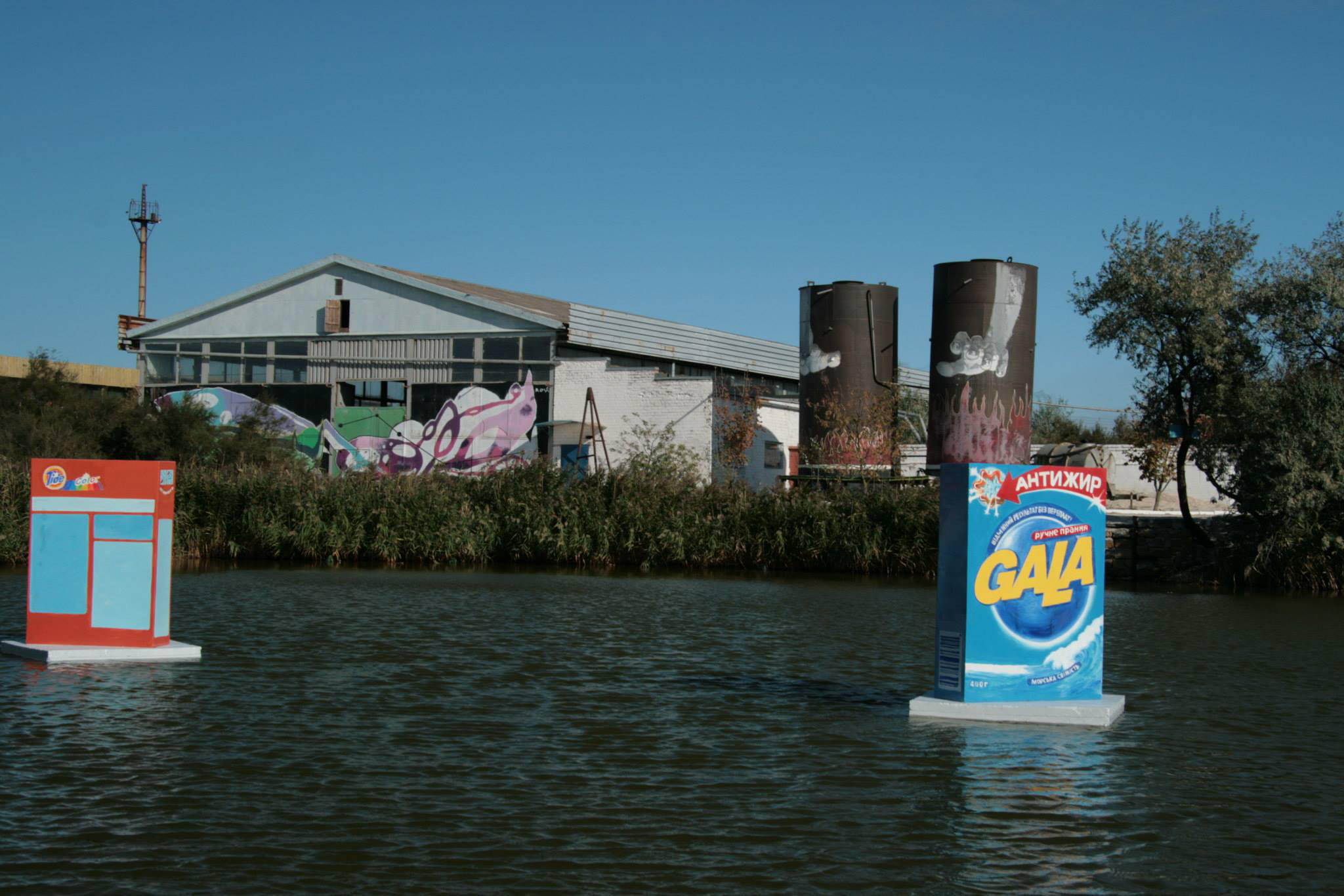
Artists' works in Byriuchyi contemporary art project

Byriuchyi contemporary art project was launched on Byriuchyi Island in 2006. A new project season starts every year. The event is held twice a year (in May and September).

In 2015, an international performative project "1000-km view" was launched. Participants on catamarans covered a distance of 1000 km from the Stryi River to Byriuchyi Island.

In the autumn of 2015, Italian film directors Gianluca e Massimiliano De Serio were shooting their film here. In 2016, the Italian film director Giorgio Cugno shot here the fourth part of the film "XAU", with the actor Ostap Stupka in the lead role.

== Name origin ==
The name of the Spit — Byriuchyi Island — is translated as "a wolf island" ("byriuk" — a lone-wolf).

The word "Byriuchyi " in the name Biruchiy contemporary art project is a neologism, a modified version of the name Byriuchyi. The neologism was created by the founders of the project in the 2000s.

== Attractions ==
There is a state reserve on the territory of Byriuchyi Island (now it is part of the Azov-Syvash National Nature Park). The reserve was created in 1927.

On the southwestern edge of the Spit, there is the Byriuchyi Lighthouse (first built in 1878).

== See also ==
List of spits of Ukraine

== Literature ==
1. Utluk Liman // The Black Sea Encyclopedia / by Sergei R. Grinevetsky, Igor S. Zonn, Sergei S. Zhiltsov, Aleksey N. Kosarev, Andrey G. Kostianoy. [Berlin] : Springer, [2015]. P. 787.
