= Azov–Syvash National Nature Park =

National park in Ukraine

- Ukrainian: Азово-Сиваський національний природний парк
- IUCN category II (national park)
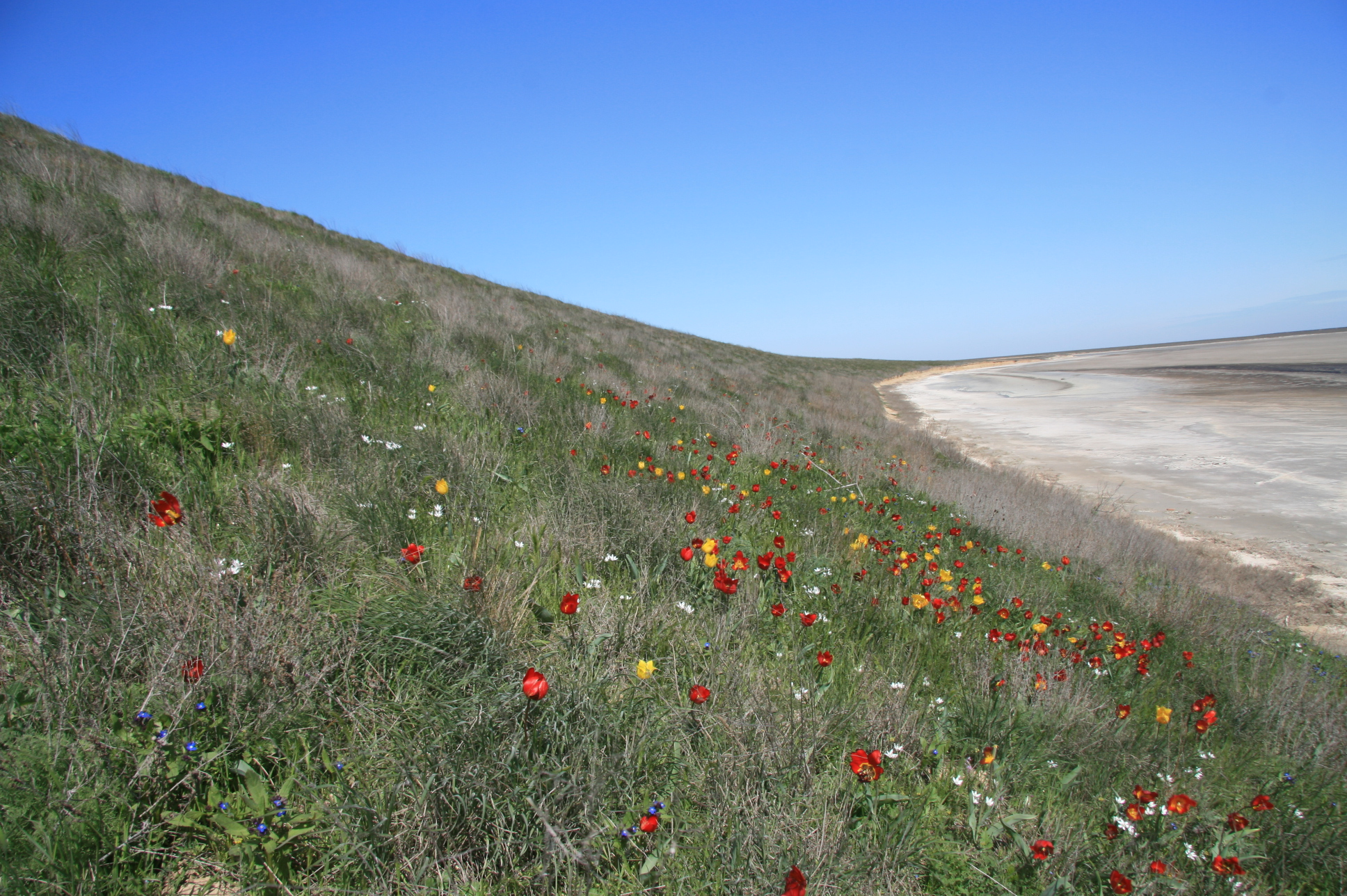
- Steppe and coastal beach, Azov-Syvash

- Location within Ukraine
- Location: Henichesk Raion, Kherson Oblast, Ukraine
- Nearest city: Henichesk
- Coordinates: 46°7′33″N 35°4′58″E
- Area: 525.8 square kilometres (203.0 mi^{2})
- Designation: National Park
- Established: February 25, 1993
- Governing body: State Management of Affairs
- Website: Official website

The Azov–Syvash National Nature Park (Ukrainian: Азово-Сиваський національний природний парк, romanized: Azovo-Syvasʹkyi natsionalʹnyi pryrodnyi park) is a national park of Ukraine, located on Byriuchyi Island in the northwestern Sea of Azov. The park was created to protect the unique coastal environment of the north-western Azov. It is particularly important as a stop on the flyway for migratory birds, with over a million birds visiting each year. It is located in Henichesk Raion of Kherson Oblast. The park was created on 25 February 1993 and has the area of 52,582.7 hectares (203.023 mi^{2}).

== Topography ==
There are two separate areas in the park:

- Azov Site: Byriuchyi Island in the Azov Sea (about 7,700 hectares). The island is in fact connected to land by the narrow Fedotova Spit. The terrain is mostly sand-end-shells estuary plains.
- Syvash Site: The waters and islands of the marine estuary stretching inland along the lagoon-like Syvash Bay (37,785 hectares).

== Climate and ecoregion ==
The park is in the Pontic–Caspian steppe ecoregion.

The official climate designation for the Azov-Syvash area is "Humid continental climate – hot summer sub-type" (Köppen climate classification Dfa), with large seasonal temperature differentials and a hot summer (at least four months averaging over 10 °C (50 °F), at least one of which is over 22 °C (72 °F). The average temperature in January is −3 °C (27 °F), and 24 °C (75 °F) in July. Precipitation is among the lowest in Ukraine, with an average of 260 mm/year.

== Flora and fauna ==
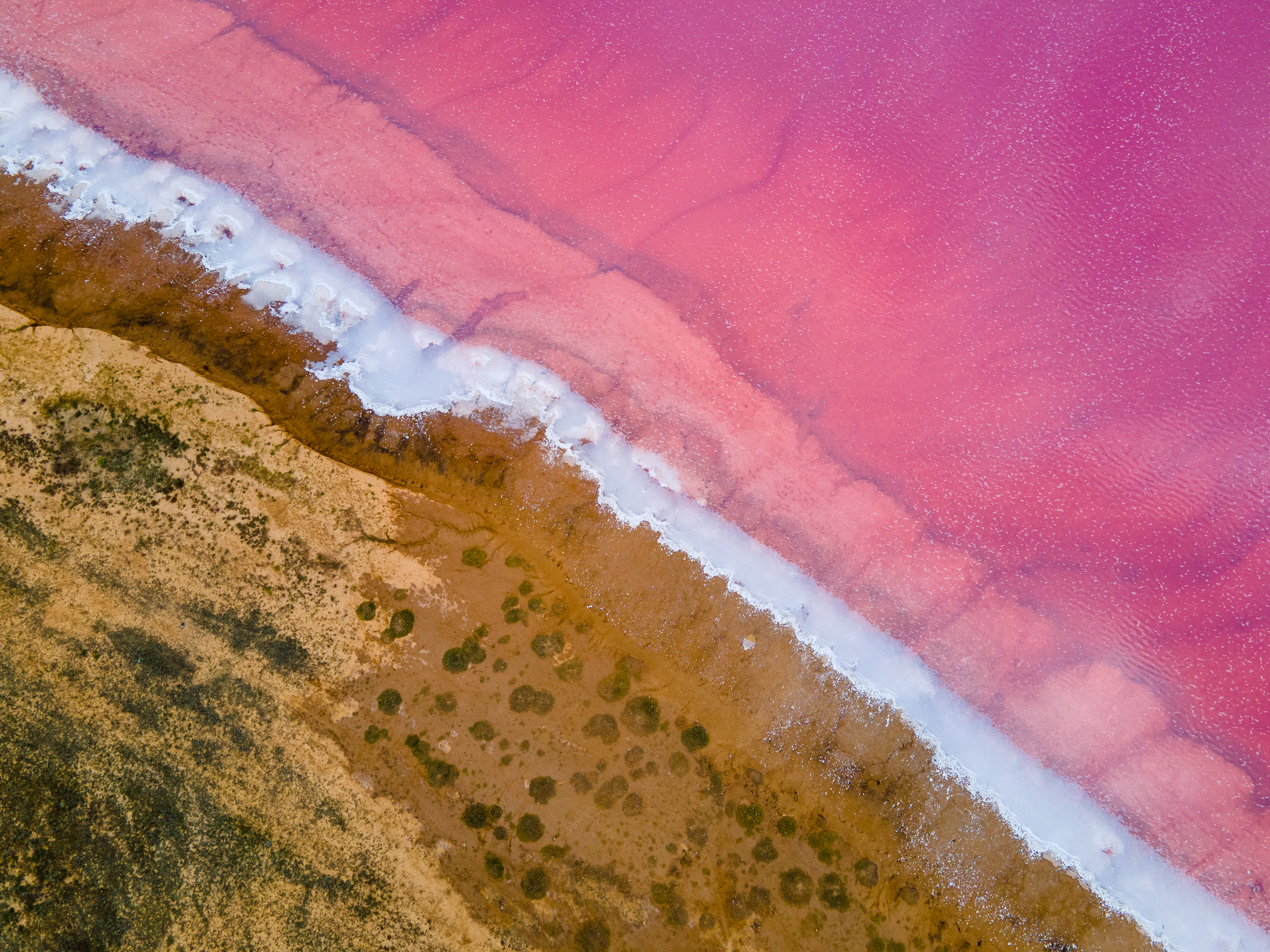
The water of Syvash can be extremely salty and may appear pink in color due to the salt-tolerant micro-alga Dunaliella salina.

The Syvash sector has a dry-steppe environment, with poor soils, and brackish vegetation. The islands in the bay have remained relatively isolated and exhibit more representative southern steppe habitats. Reed beds line portions of the Syvash sector. The Azov site is an important resting spot for migratory birds. The Central Syvash portion of the park is a Ramsar wetland of international importance. The site is also part of an Important Bird and Biodiversity Area (IBA) listed by Birdlife International.

=== Flora ===
In such climatic and soil conditions on Syvashy relatively poor desert steppe and saline vegetation with the corresponding steppe fauna is formed. More favorable environmental conditions on the island. Biryuchy, where the real southern steppes are widespread, and along the Utlyutsky estuary – reed thickets.

On the protected islands of Central Syvash – Churyuk and Kuyuk-Tuk – which were less affected by anthropogenic impact, true steppe phytocenoses have been preserved.

=== Fauna ===
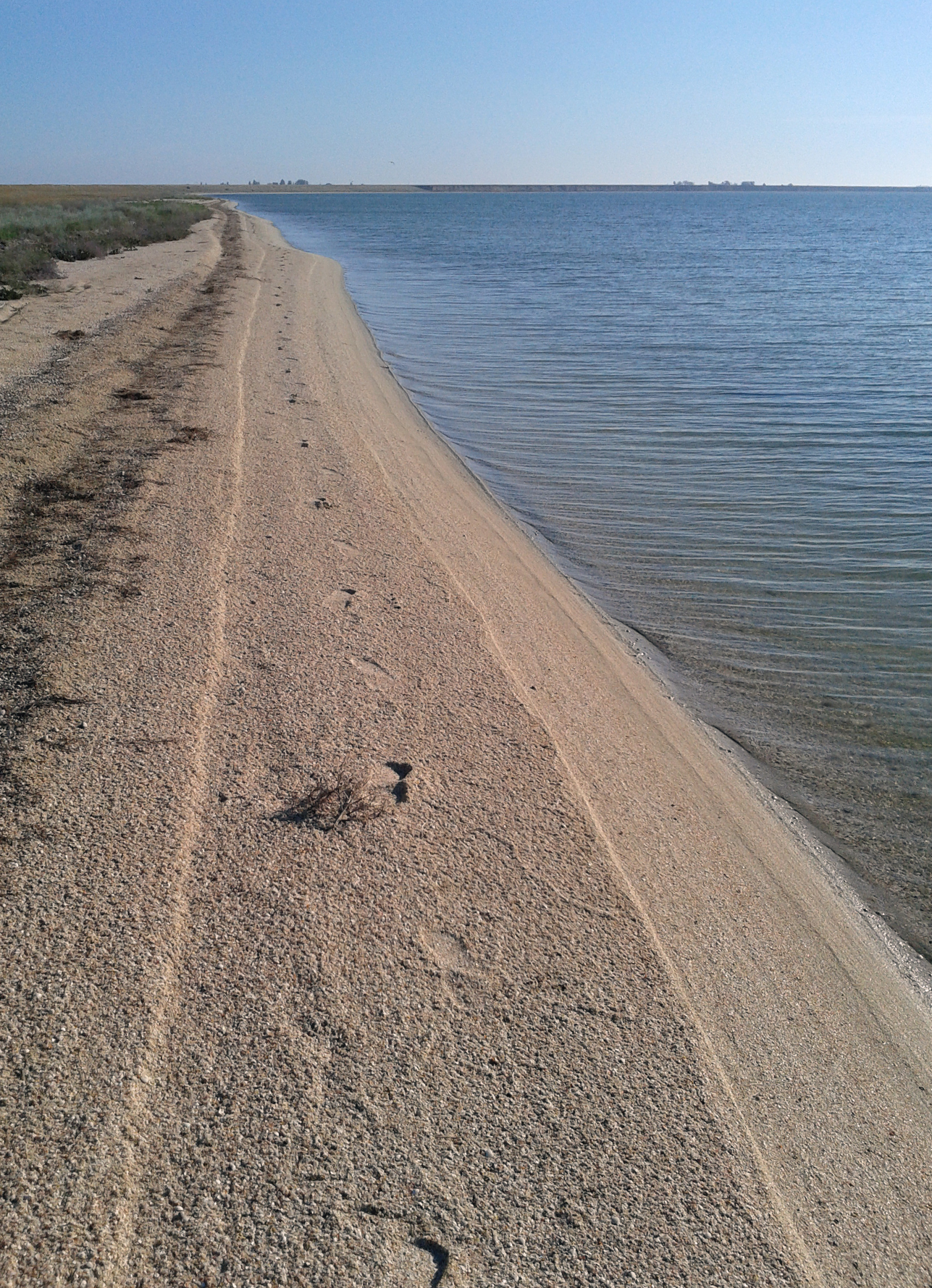
Sand-coquina beach in Azov-Syvash

This bay is a particularly valuable land for wetland birds in winter. More than 1 million birds (swallows, ducks, marsh terns, waders, mute swans, shelducks, herons, etc.) are registered in seasonal clusters during the year; including rare, vulnerable and endangered species listed in the Red Book of Ukraine, such as kentish plover, black-winged stilt, eurasian oystercatcher, white-headed duck, Pallas's gull and white-tailed eagle. Nearby in the steppes of Prysyvashshya the great bustard, the little bustard, the Demoiselle crane and common crane, the hen harrier, the pallid harrier, golden eagle, greater spotted eagle, saker falcon, peregrine falcon, lesser kestrel. A total of 30 species of "Red Book" birds have been registered in the park. Of these, the white-tailed eagle and the little bustard are also included in the European Red List. More than 1% of individuals of red-breasted goose and Greylag goose populations that overwinter here can live in the lands. A total of 197 bird species have been registered in the park.

Steppe grasses contributed to the formation of large populations of acclimatized animals. Acclimatization work began in 1928. The maximum number of red deer (830 heads) was observed here in 1992, fallow deer (1425 heads) in 1991, mouflon (987 heads) 1992, onager (37 heads) 1994. Of the hunting birds, the common pheasant is acclimatized here, the number of which periodically reaches several hundred. In addition, the Byriuchyi Island has created favourable conditions for the existence of aboriginal species of fauna, such as the grey hare, fox and acclimatized raccoon dog. The number of these animals, given the tense epidemiological situation in the region, has to be constantly regulated.

In total, there are more than 5,000 species of animals within the park, including 250 species of vertebrates. Amphibians often include the green toad and the marsh frog, among the reptiles there are numerous sand lizards, multicolored lizards, grass snakes and dice snakes. Of the 26 registered in park waters of fish species of commercial value are European flounders and kalkan, marbled goby, Caucasian dwarf goby, russian sturgeon, stellate sturgeon, as well as the recently acclimatized in the Sea of Azov so-iuy mullet.

The park also protects many species of animals listed in the Red Book of Ukraine: great jerboa, steppe polecat, azov dolphin, four-striped and yellow-bellied slugs, smooth snake, Vipera renardi, as well as two species of hydroid polyps, one species of ringworm and 5 crustaceans insect species: empusa pennicornis, iris plyamystokrylyy, wasp road, Cryptocheilus rubellus, dauber, Stizus fasciatus wasp, white leucomigus.

In total, 250 species of vertebrates live on the territory of the Azov-Syvash National Nature Park, 48 of them are listed in the Red Book of Ukraine.

== Public use ==
As a national park, Azov-Syvash is divided into four use-specific zones, providing for a protected area (38,970 hectares in Central Syvash), a regulated recreation zone (618 ha), a local recreation area (93 ha), and an "economic zone" (12,473 ha).
