= Irshansk =

Rural settlement in Zhytomyr Oblast, Ukraine

Irshansk Іршанськ
- Rural settlement
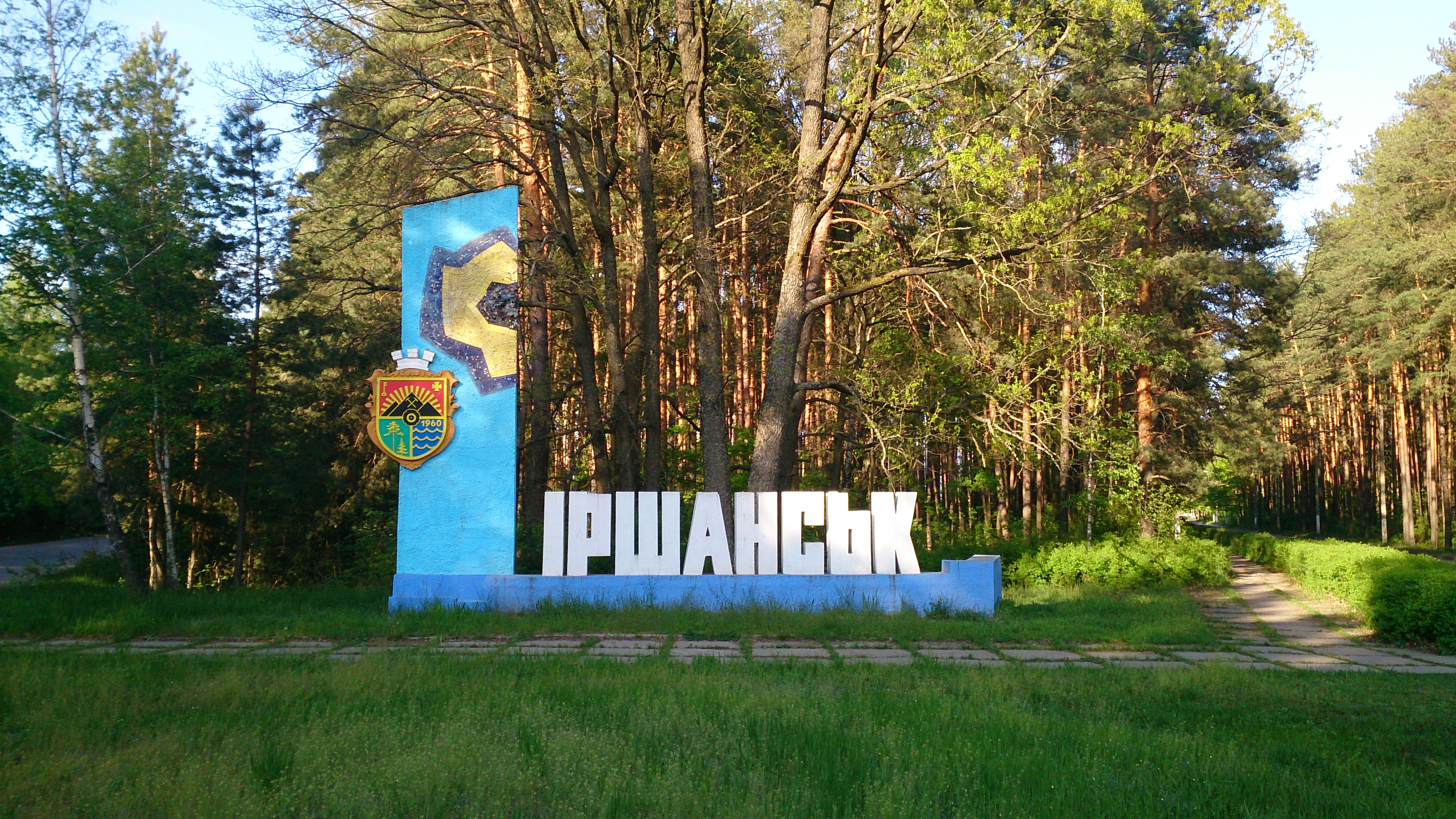
- Stele at the main entrance to the town

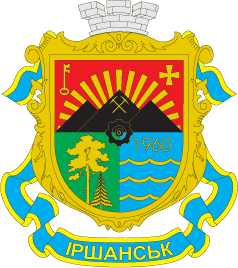
- Coat of arms

- Location within Zhytomyr Oblast Location within Ukraine
- Coordinates: 50°45′5″N 28°43′16″E
- Country: Ukraine
- Oblast: Zhytomyr Oblast
- Raion: Korosten Raion
- Hromada: Irshansk settlement hromada

Area
  - Total: 14.76 km^{2} (5.70 sq mi)

Population (2022)
  - Total: 6,346
- Time zone: UTC+2 (EET)
  - Summer (DST): UTC+3 (EEST)
- Postal code: 12110
- Website: Irshansk Town Council

Irshansk (Ukrainian: Іршанськ) is a rural settlement in Korosten Raion, Zhytomyr Oblast, Ukraine. The population was 6,346 (2022 estimate).

Irshansk is, together with Vilnohirsk, the centre of the Ukrainian titanium ore industry.

== History ==
The founding of Irshansk is directly linked to the development of its anchor enterprise—the Irshansk Mining and Processing Plant, which specializes in the extraction and processing of ilmenite (titanium) ores. Alluvial ilmenite deposits are located within a radius of 6–21 km from the town. The enterprise’s production cycle encompasses the full range of operations: from overburden removal and direct ore extraction to its subsequent industrial processing.

Irshansk was established on August 5, 1960, as a workers’ settlement based on the industrial sites of the Irshansk Mining and Processing Plant and the Irshansk Construction and Installation Administration No. 72 (BMU-72). The first settlers in the area of the modern settlement in 1953 were geological prospectors and construction workers. Locals initially referred to the new settlement as “11th Kilometer” (based on its distance from the Turchynka railway station), and unofficially as “Titanograd.” At the time of its founding, the settlement was administratively subordinate to the Novoborivka Settlement Council; it was home to workers, office employees, and their families—a total of 876 residents.

The subsoil of the Irshansk area is rich in valuable minerals, with ilmenite deposits ranking first among them. The Polissya titanium deposits were discovered in the 1930s by the renowned Zhytomyr geologist, Professor Stepan Belsky, who presented the first scientific data on the high concentration of ilmenite in the riverbed of the Irsha River. Geologists continued to explore, study, and evaluate the deposits both before and after the war. According to local lore, the extraction of bog ore along the banks of the Irsh began as far back as the Cossack era, and the metal produced from it was used to manufacture agricultural implements and sturdy weapons.

In late 1954, Power Train No. 37—comprising 31 specialists—arrived at the Pryreikova base in the village of Nova Borova as the first organized production unit from Kyrgyzstan; their task was to provide electricity to the new facility. That marked the beginning of the history of the Irshansk Mining and Processing Plant—the leading enterprise in the Zhytomyr region for the extraction and enrichment of ilmenite sands. Semyon Markelovich Sannikov was appointed the plant’s first director (one of the village’s alleys was later named in his honor). The new enterprise began industrial development of the Irshansk group of titanium ore deposits.

In the spring of 1956, a 50-liter experimental dredge produced its first kilograms of ilmenite concentrate. At that time, in addition to the industrial complex, Irshansk was home to two construction and installation departments, the Turchyn Industrial Complex, and a bakery. Barrack-style dormitories were built for the workers on what is now Gulia Street. Later, a club, two libraries, a medical clinic, a kindergarten, a post office, a telecommunications office, and a cafeteria were opened in the town. In 1956, the first two well-equipped residential buildings—Nos. 1 and 3 on Gagarin Street (now Defenders of Ukraine Street)—were also constructed.

In January 1963, Irshansk was officially granted the status of an urban-type settlement (now a village). During the 1960s–1980s, intensive large-scale construction took place: apartment buildings, a hospital, schools, kindergartens, and a Palace of Culture were built. Funding for social infrastructure depended entirely on the mining company’s balance sheet and profits. The development of the quarries was accompanied by a radical change in the landscape around the settlement: deforestation, the appearance of overburden dumps, and the flooding of abandoned quarry pits.

In 1986, the titanium miners’ settlement was awarded a Certificate of Honor by the Supreme Council of the Ukrainian SSR for its labor achievements, high cultural standards, and exemplary urban development.

The collapse of the USSR in 1991 brought an end to the former centralized state orders for the military-industrial complex, for which the Irshansk Mining and Processing Plant was a key supplier of titanium raw materials. The disruption of logistical links led to a sharp decline in production volumes. Wages for the plant’s employees were delayed for months, forcing a significant portion of skilled engineers and workers to leave in search of work elsewhere.

In 2015, the Irshansk Settlement Territorial Community was established, uniting the town of Irshansk and the surrounding villages of the Korosten District. This allowed a significant portion of taxes—including personal income tax from the plant’s employees—to remain directly in the local budget. During this period, the hospital, the “Titan” Palace of Culture, and the art schools were permanently removed from the industrial giant’s balance sheet and transferred to the communal ownership of the settlement council, thereby protecting the infrastructure from the mining company’s operational risks.

== Demographics ==
According to the 2001 census, the population of Irshansk was 6,312.

Historical population
1970*	1979*	1989*	2001*	2006	2007	2008	2009	2010	2011	2012	2013
3 454	4 642	5 794	6 312	6 469	6 556	6 548	6 607	6 616	6 652	6 714	6 771

Languages spoken natively by residents are:

- 88.24% — Ukrainian
- 11.33% — Russian
- 0.13% — Belarusian
- 0.02% — Bulgarian
- 0.02% — Romanian
- 0.02% — Moldovan
- 0.02% — Polish

== Industry ==
The main enterprise driving the city’s development is the “Irshansk Mining and Processing Plant” branch, which is part of JSC “United Mining and Chemical Company” (JSC “UMCC”). Historically, from 2004 to 2014, the plant was leased to Crimean TITAN PJSC; however, upon the expiration of the lease agreement, the property returned to state control. As part of the “Large-Scale Privatization” program, the state’s stake in the company was acquired by Temin Ukraine LLC, which is owned by the international Azerbaijani conglomerate NEQSOL Holding (beneficial owner—Nasib Hasanov). The transaction received official approval from the Antimonopoly Committee of Ukraine.

Ilmenite concentrate is mined using open-pit methods at the Irshansk group of deposits. The goal of the mining operation is to extract 50–70 kg of ilmenite ore from every metric ton of rock, which lies at a depth of 15 to 30 meters. The plant produced its first output in the spring of 1956. Initially, mining was carried out using two electric dredges, each with a capacity of 210 liters, with the rough concentrates being processed at a beneficiation plant. In 1966, Quarry No. 1 was commissioned to develop the terraced portion of the placer deposit. In 1970, the Lemnensk Mine, featuring a complete mining and beneficiation cycle, was launched, and in 1971, Quarry No. 2 was opened, to which the dredges and walking excavators were relocated.

Amid martial law and a change in ownership, the plant has completely restructured its supply chains. Its products are exported exclusively to the European market, the United States, and Asian countries. Some of the raw materials are supplied to domestic chemical companies, including PJSC “Sumykhimprom.”

== Churches ==
The overwhelming majority of Irshansk’s religious population identifies as Christian. Orthodox Christianity is the largest denomination in the town, while the Roman Catholic community forms the second-largest parish and plays a significant role in the community’s spiritual life. According to data from the Irshansk Village Council, the main active religious center is the Church of the Holy Protection.

The Roman Catholic Parish of the Child Jesus was officially registered on March 28, 1995. Construction of the brick church lasted more than two decades. The first services were held in the basement. On August 24, 2019, the first solemn Holy Mass was celebrated in the upper hall of the completed church, cementing the parish’s status as an important religious center in Irshansk. The faithful of Irshansk and the neighboring village of Staryky continue to be served by diocesan priests from the Parish of Our Lady of Sorrows in Nova Borova.

There is also a religious congregation of the Christian Baptist Church in the village.

== Gallery ==
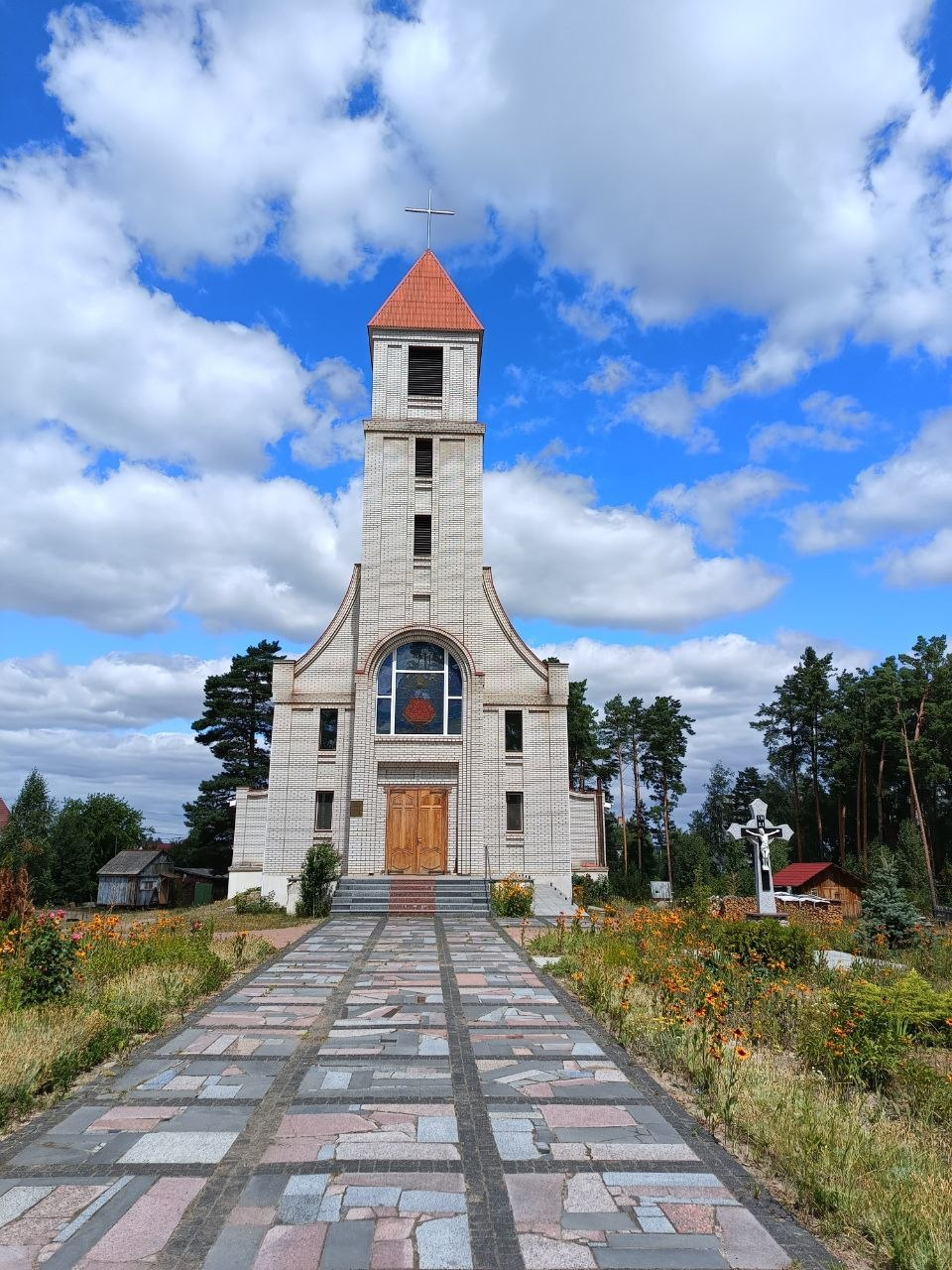
The Roman Catholic Church of the Infant Jesus in Irshansk

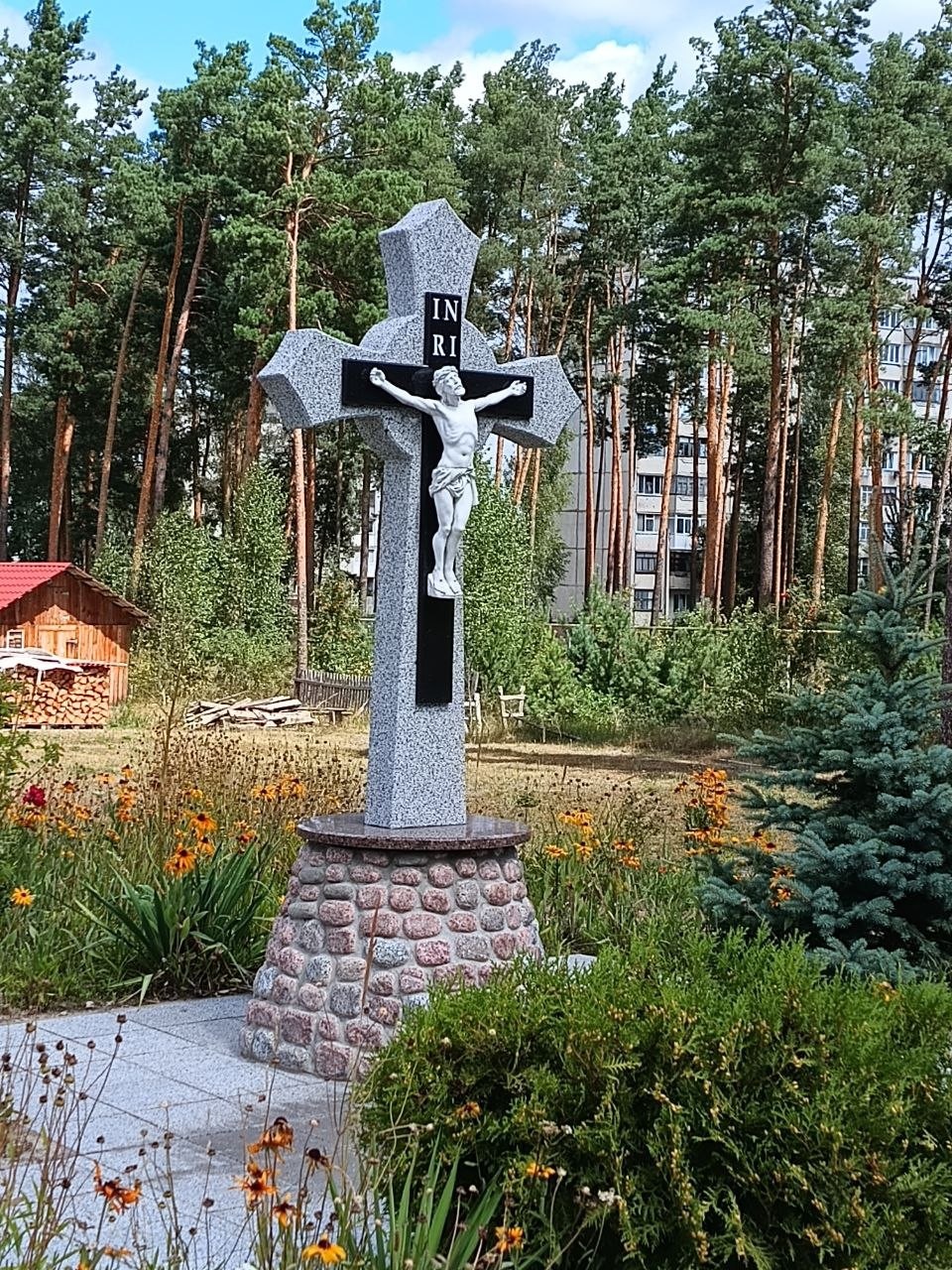
The cross near the Church of the Infant Jesus in Irshansk

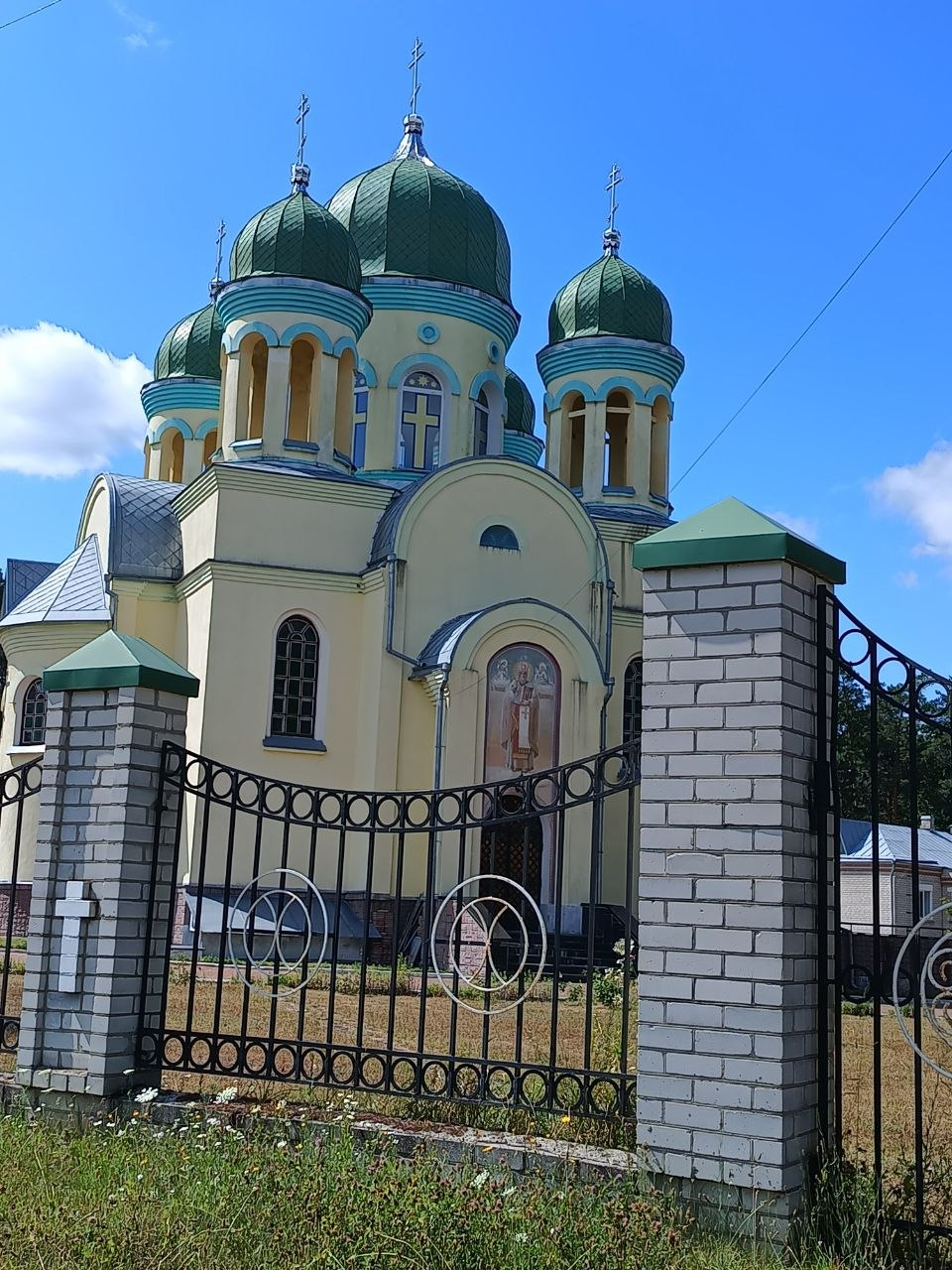
Church of the Intercession of the Most Holy Mother of God

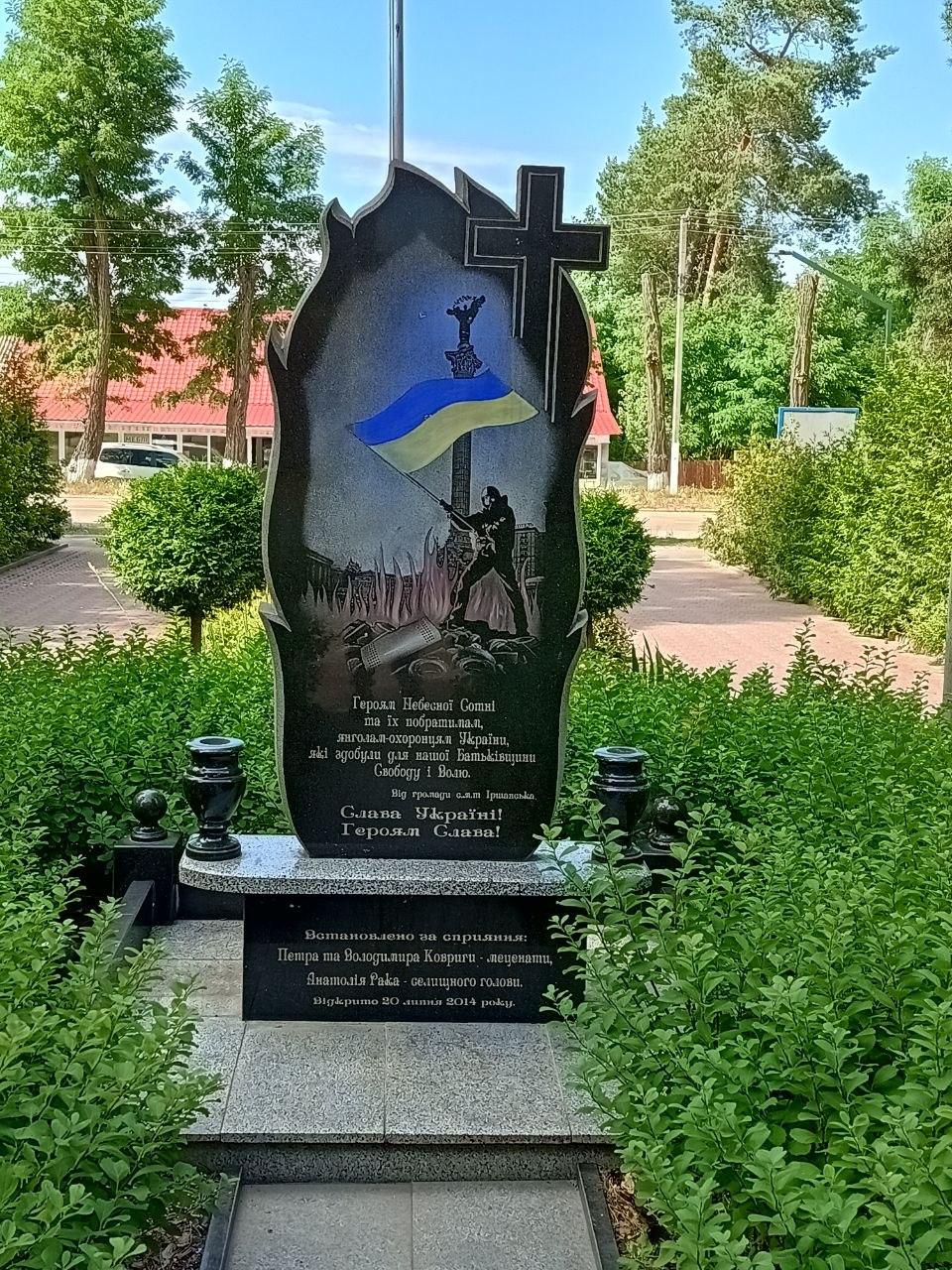
Monument to the Heroes of the Heavenly Hundred

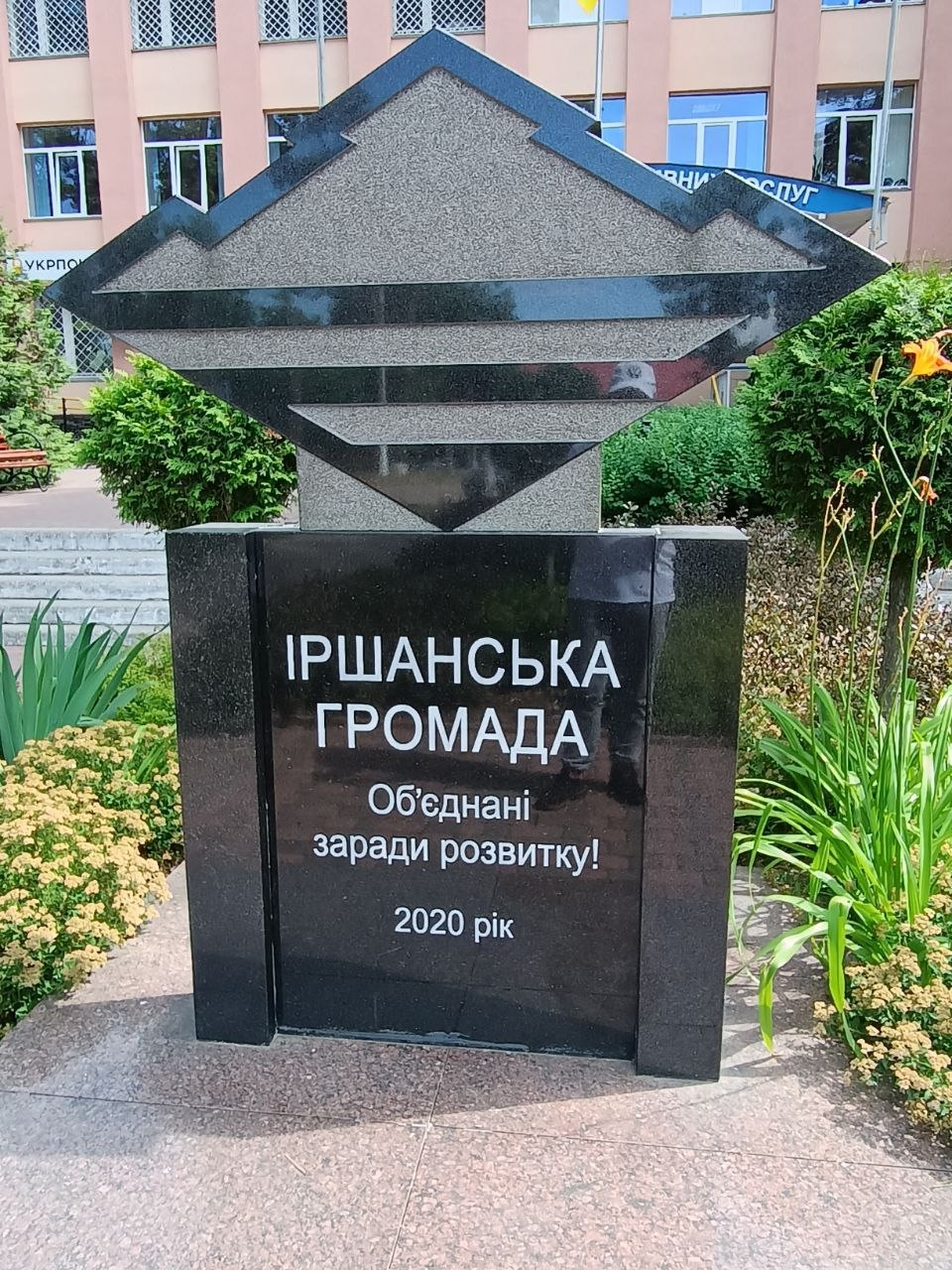
A monument commemorating the founding of the Irshansk community

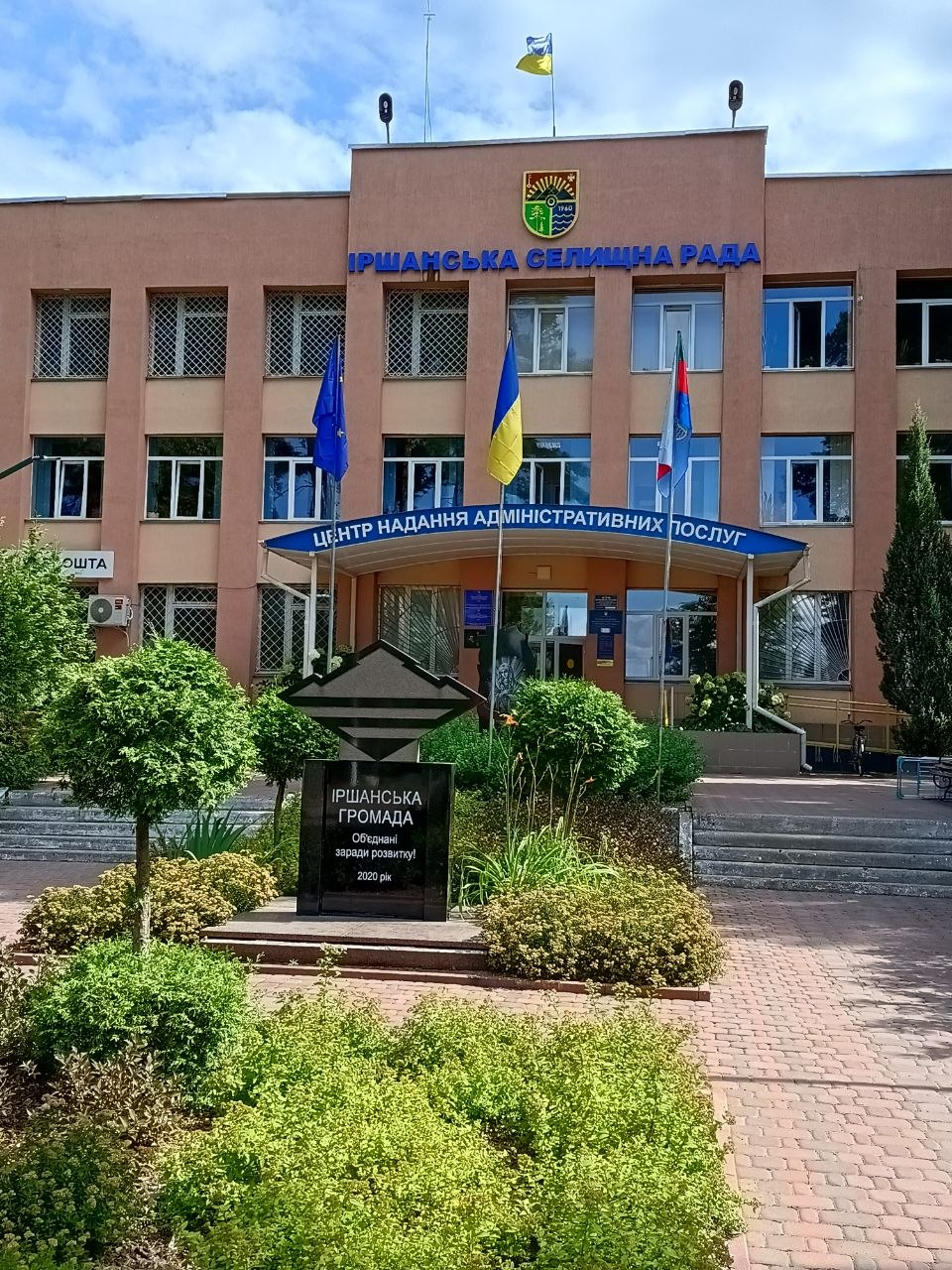
Irshansk Township Council

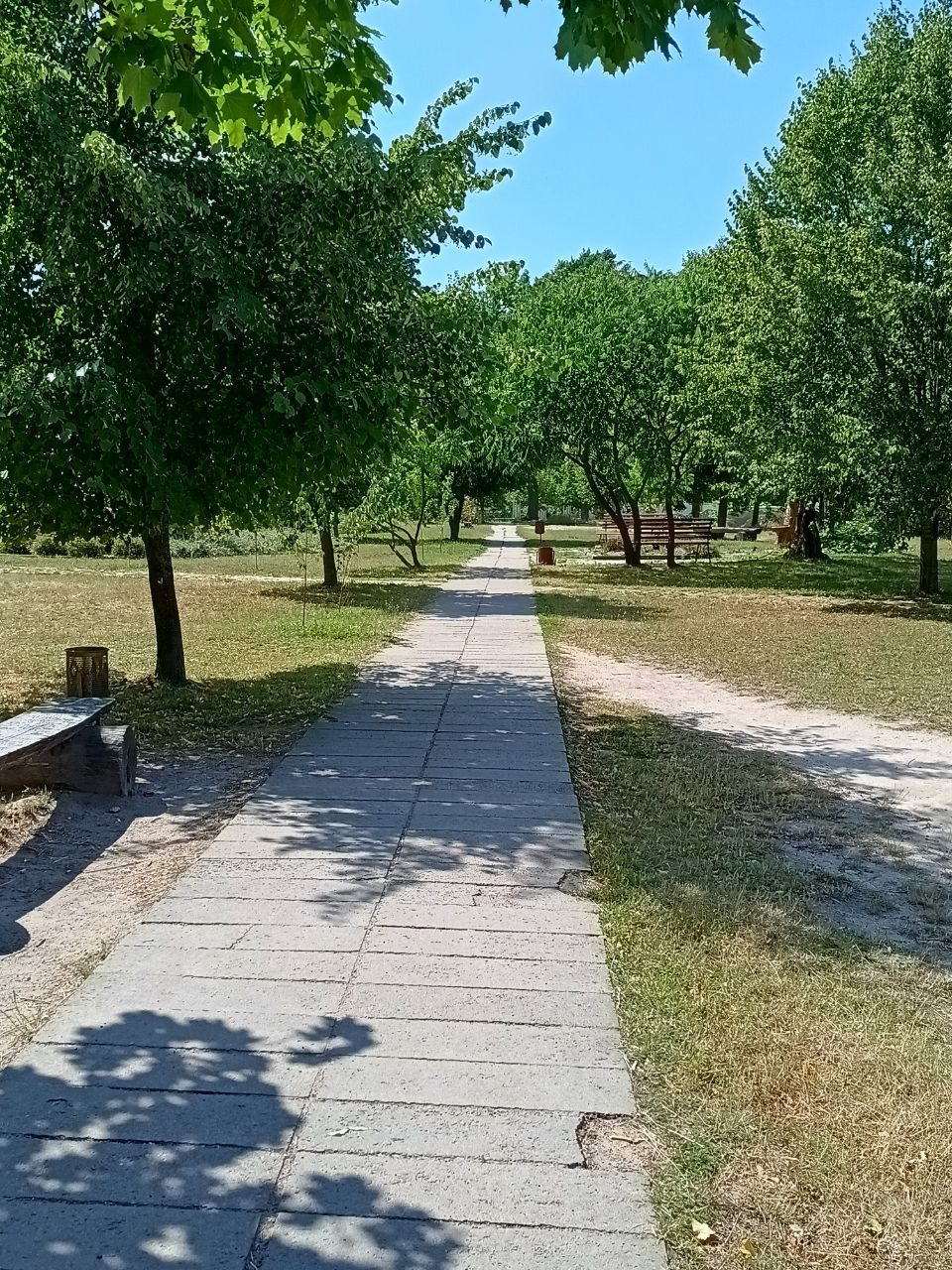
The park on Gulia Street in Irshansk

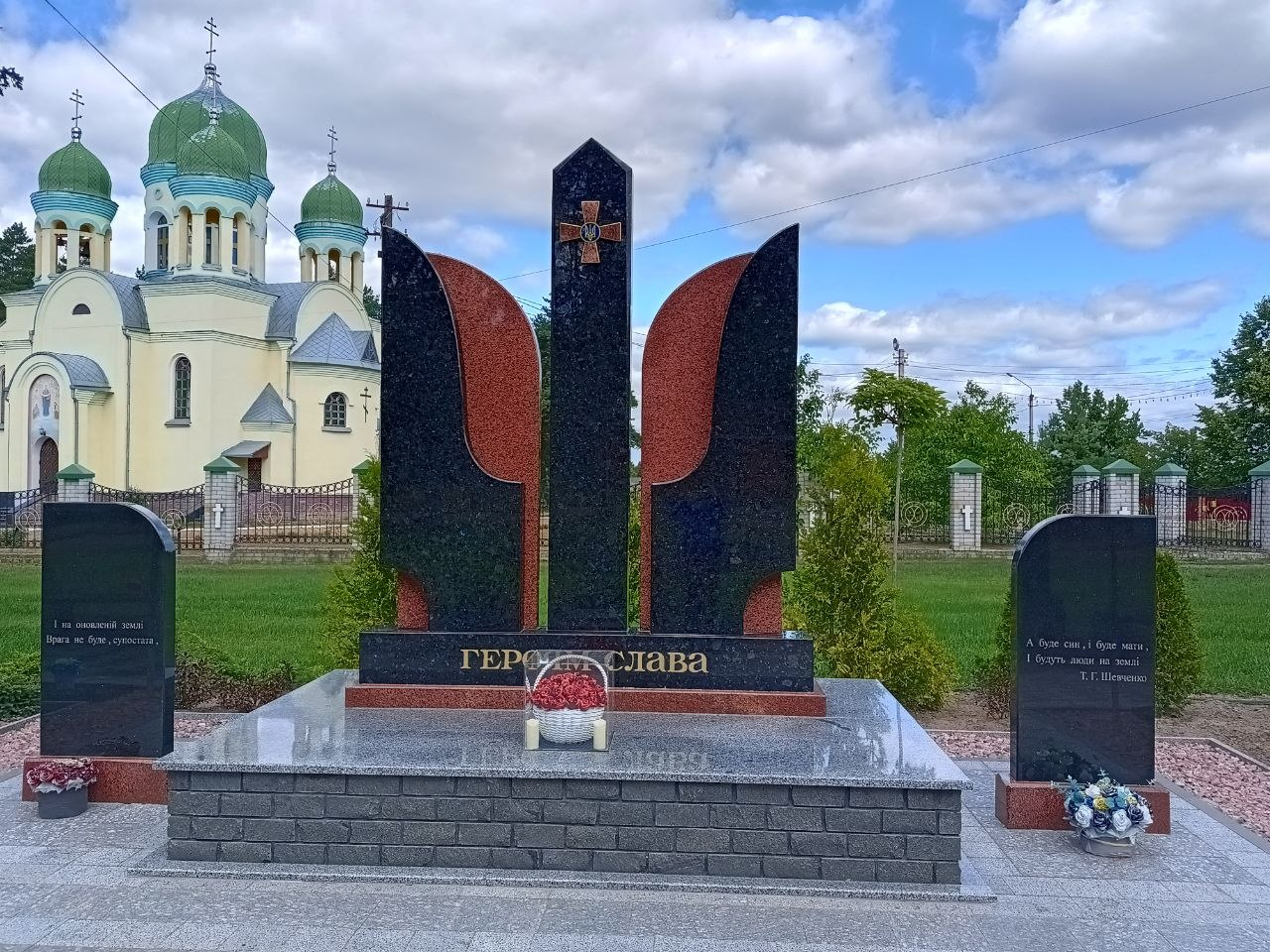
Memorial to the Fallen Defenders of Ukraine
