= Goldens =

Ukrainian auction house

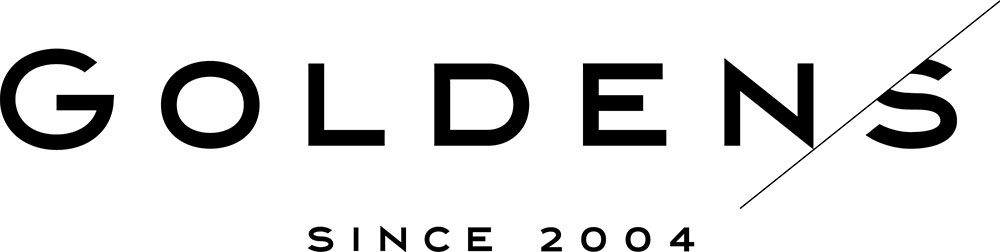
- Formerly: Gold Section
- Company type: Private
- Industry: Fine arts, object design, fine-art photography
- Founded: November 19, 2004; 21 years ago, in Kyiv, Ukraine
- Headquarters: 4 Pervomaiskoho Street, Kyiv, Ukraine
- Area served: Ukraine
- Services: Auctions
- Owner: Mykhailo Vasylenko
- Website: gs-art.com

Goldens (known as Golden Section until 2022; Ukrainian: Золотий перетин, romanized: Zolotyi neretny; Russian: Золотое сечение, romanized: Zolotoye sechniye) is a Ukrainian auction house. It was founded in November 19, 2004. It holds auctions, solo and group art exhibitions, and participates in charity projects. Main areas of expertise: classical painting of the 19th–20th centuries, modern art (avant-garde, nonconformist art, underground), contemporary art. In addition, it deals with sculpture in the round, garden sculpture, graphic arts, limited edition art prints, fine-art photography, object design. It was the first Ukrainian company to contemporary art, hold design and photography auctions.

According to L'Officiel Ukraine, in 2019, there were 2 auction houses (Goldens and Dukat) in the country that worked on a regular basis, while more than 10 others could not withstand the competition and closed down. Goldens (called Golden Section at that time) became the main auction house in the Ukrainian art market, taking a leading position.

== History ==
=== Events ===
In March 2005 the company held the first auction of Ukrainian art of the 1930s–80s. It defined the art market segment for the next 4 years.

The first Ukrainian contemporary art auction was held in 2009. In addition to paintings, installation art, environmental art, video art, fine-art photography, street art and digital art lots were exhibited for the first time in the country's history. In 2009–2010, due to active efforts of the auction house, contemporary art has got on domestic collectors' preference list. The company has gained the status of a major player in the contemporary art market segment.

The first object design auction in Ukraine was held in 2010. It comprised environmental and installation art, as well as authorial conceptual furniture, light fixtures, ceramics, and glass art. "Classic. Contemporary. Design" auction (2012) was announced the biggest and the most diverse in Ukraine's history. It offered three big blocks of top lots: classical art of the 19th–20th centuries, contemporary art and collectible object design.

Despite the ongoing war in Donbas, "Post war & contemporary art" auction (2014) attracted new collectors. It was the first auction in the Ukrainian art market since the beginning of the war.

In 2017 the auction house opened its own gallery space. It holds regular solo and group exhibitions (8–10 projects per year) by famous Ukrainian and international artists. "Editions", the first Ukrainian auction of limited edition art prints took place on January 31, 2017; its format was carried on in the subsequent years. "Editions" presented the world's famous artists: Albrecht Dürer, Pablo Picasso, Salvador Dalí, Kazimir Malevich, Wassily Kandinsky, Marc Chagall, Joan Miró, Andy Warhol, Fernand Léger, Amedeo Modigliani, Oleksandra Ekster, Jean-Michel Basquiat, Rembrandt Harmenszoon van Rijn, Giovanni Battista Piranesi, Marcantonio Raimondi, Alberto Giacometti, Henri Matisse, Katsushika Hokusai.

During Covid lockdown restrictions in 2020, Goldens did not stop working and held online auctions. The new bidding channel attracted young collectors to the market. Over the next few years, all final bidding will be held online.

In February 2022 the auction house went through rebranding and changed its previous name Golden Section to Goldens. During Russia's invasion of Ukraine, on April 19, 2022, in partnership with Koller Auktionen (Zürich, Switzerland), the charity event "Have a heart" was held to raise funds for Ukrainian artists who have been in a difficult situation since the beginning of the war. A large charity auction "Art can help" was held to support the Armed Forces of Ukraine.

=== Auctioned artwork ===
Among the famous artists whose works are regularly included in auction and exhibition collections are the classics of Ukrainian painting of the 1880s–1910s: Ivan Trush, Mykola Murashko, Serhii Svitoslavskyi, Mykola Burachek, Serhii Vasylkivskyi, Oleksa Novakivskyi; the avant-garde of the 1900s–1920s: Wassily Kandinsky, Vasyl Yermylov, Maksymilian Voloshyn; the emigration of the 20th century: Vasyl Khmeliuk, Davyd Burliuk, Oleksa Hryshchenko, Sonia Levytska, Petro Nilus; the 1930s–80s: Mykola Hlushchenko, Serhii Shyshko, Tetiana Yablonska, Yosyp Bokshai, Adalbert Erdeli, Fedir Zakharov, Fedir Manailo, Viktor Zaretsky, Alla Horska, Anatoly Zverev, Mihail Chemiakin, Valentyn Khrushch, Mariia Prymachenko; 1990s–2020s: Ivan Marchuk, Oleksandr Hnylytskyi, Arsen Savadov, Oleksandr Roitburd, Pavlo Kerestei, Vasyl Riabchenko, Oleh Tistol, Ihor Podolchak, Oleksandr Zhyvotkov, Mykhailo Deiak, Vlada Ralko, Illia Chychkan, Viktor Sydorenko, and Matvii Vaisberg.

The most expensive works sold at the auction are "Sinister sea" by Mykola Hlushchenko (US$165,000; 2008), "Garden of temptation" ($120,000; 2022), "Golden night" ($96,800; 2021) and "Boats overgrown with flowers" ($56,000; 2020) by Ivan Marchuk, "Black swan" by Leonid Kozlov ($101,800; 2021), "Chrysanthemums" by Serhii Shyshko ($61,600; 2006), "August" by Viktor Zaretsky ($55,000; 2011), as well a "Lviv. Rynok square" by Yosyp Bokshai ($44,000; 2006), "Ulysses" by Oleksandr Hnylytskyi ($44,000; 2011). Selling an artwork at Goldens serves as a significant impetus for raising price quotations of the artwork. For example, "Kavkaz No. 32" by Oleh Tistol, sold at Kyiv-based Goldens auction (Golden Section at that time) for $5,500 2012, went under the hammer for £15,000 ($23,500) at London Sotheby's auction in November 2014.

Of the named works, the first two were included in the ranking "Six most expensive paintings by Ukrainian artists" (2022), compiled by the Lokalna Istoriia scientific historical research project. "Sinister sea" by Mykola Hlushchenko was ranked 3rd, and "Garden of temptation" by Ivan Marchuk was ranked 5th. The business magazine Forbes Ukraine has made its own ranking "Five most expensive Ukrainian artworks" (2022), which includes "Sinister sea", which invariably occupies the 3rd position, and "Garden of temptation" was pushed out of the 5th position by the most expensive Ukrainian photograph.

The auction "Avant-garde" (2010) presented a painting by Wassily Kandinsky, which is considered one of the world's first works of abstract art.

== Departments ==
- Classic Art (since 2005)
- Contemporary Art (since 2009)
- Editions (since 2017)
- Design (since 2010)

== Process ==
The auction house Goldens provides a wide range of services including private sales; collections compilation; art-banking (investment portfolio); interior design, cooperation with designers, and selection of gifts. The collection can be viewed at the pre-auction show, in the printed catalog or on the company's official website. Online, real time bidding has been available since 2010. The GS-Art Store has been working online since 2023.

== Art exhibition ==
46 exhibition projects have been held since 2005. Significant events include two large-scale icon expositions (2009, 2014), retrospective exhibitions by the artists Yakiv Basov (2006), Mykola Hlushchenko (2012), and Viktor Zaretsky (2012, 2017). The exhibition of graphics by Zaretskyi (2012; 388 works) has been the artist's largest solo exhibition.

A special project, "Ukrainian underground" (2017), presented works by Ukrainian artists of the Sixtiers. Another important exhibition, "The art of emigrant artists of the 20th century" (2019), presented 31 works from collections from Ukraine, France, Germany, Netherlands, and United States.

At the exhibition by the Spanish surrealist Salvador Dalí "Les songes drolatiques de Pantagruel", the visitors were offered a complete set of the artist's lithographs from the series of 1973, under the same name: 25 lithographs hand-signed and numbered by the artist. Before framing, the lithographs had been stored in a special folder made in the form of a medieval book, which was also presented at the exhibition.

34 of the 46 exhibition projects received printed catalogs and albums.

== Publishing activities ==
85 editions (50 auction catalogs, 34 albums and exhibition catalogs, and 1 digest) have been published since 2005. A catalog of icons of the 17th – early 20th centuries (2009) and "The catalog of the exhibition of M. Hlushchenko's graphic (1930s–1970s)" (2012) was published under the auspices of the National Museum "Kyiv Art Gallery". We should also mention the album "Purity of soul" (2014, icons of the 16th–20th century). Other important catalogs are "Ukrainian underground" (2017), "Ukrainian classical art of the 20th century" (2018), "The art of emigrant artists of the 20th century" (2019), and "Heartbeats" (2022). Other published editions an album of graphics and a catalog of paintings by Viktor Zaretski (2012, 2017), and a catalog of the series of Salvador Dalí's lithographs "Les songes drolatiques de Pantagruel" (2020).

The information digest of the auction house was published in 2012. The editor-in-chief is Mykhailo Vasylenko, among the authors are Dmytro Horbachov, Volodymyr Petrashyk, and Olha Balashova. Full-color glossy edition. Language: Russian, edition of 5000 copies.
