= Oleh Ataiants =

Ukrainian cultural activist, philanthropist, businessman

- Олег Атаянц
- Born: January 4, 1978 (age 48); Odesa, Ukraine
- Known for: Founder of the multimedia gallery "Ataiants Gallery", creator of the art installation "Fuck gas weapon" and the project "Made in Chernobyl"

Oleh Ataiants (Ukrainian: Олег Євгенович Атаянц; January 4, 1978, Odesa, Ukraine) is a Ukrainian cultural activist, philanthropist, businessman. He is the founder of the multimedia gallery Ataiants Gallery, the creator of the art installation in Kyiv Fuck gas weapon (2023), which was the artist's response to Russia's gas blackmail.

== Biography ==
Oleh Ataiants was born on January 4, 1978, in Odesa.

In 2008, he graduated from the State University of Chemical Technology (Dnipro) with a degree in Manager-Economist.

== Art projects ==
Since the 2000s, Oleh Ataiants has supported a number of cultural and artistic projects in Odesa.

=== Ataiants Gallery ===
In 2017, Oleh Ataiants founded Ataiants Gallery. It is a modern multimedia gallery with a closed showroom in Kyiv. It presents works by contemporary Ukrainian and foreign artists.

=== Made in Chernobyl project ===
In 2019, Oleh Ataiants initiated the art project Made in Chernobyl. His main task of the project is to give a new creative interpretation of the Chernobyl tragedy. This is the world's first international art residency, which took place from October 24 to 27, 2019. The artists went directly to the Chernobyl exclusion zone and created their works there. Their works were presented at an exhibition at the Museum of Kyiv History.

A number of well-known artists and photographers participated in the project: Illya Chichkan, Masha Shubina, Ksenia Oksyn, Yulia Kysil, Olga Drozd, Olga Vysotska, Stan Kvitko, Dmytro Motuzko, Oleksiy Burda, Anna Luhovska, Arazyan Bagrat (Armenia), Peter Lagler (Austria), Katerina Burlina (Slovenia), Edik Belsky (Slovenia), Paride Di Stefano (Italy), Serhiy Savchenko (Poland), Mike Renard (USA), and Oleh Ataiants himself.

=== Fuck gas weapon ===
In 2023, the National Hotel in Kyiv hosted the opening of Oleh Ataiants' installation Fuck gas weapon, an artist's response to Russia's gas blackmail. The installation consists of twisted gas pipes that form a clear figure with a "middle finger".

The author came up with the idea for this work back in 2022, at the height of Russia's war against Ukraine, after the Nord Stream 2 gas pipeline was blown up. The author realized his idea in Dnipro.

The pipes are painted in national colors – yellow on the outside and blue on the inside – to emphasize national identity. With his work, Oleh Ataiants wanted to show that Russia's gas blackmail will not work, and to convince the people of Europe, who are worried about expensive gas, that Ukraine, where people are dying because of the war, has much bigger problems.

After the presentation at the National Hotel in Kyiv, the installation of gas pipes Fuck gas weapon will be exhibited at art fairs in the United States. The author plans to sell his work at an auction and donate the proceeds to the needs of Ukrainian defenders.

== Patronage projects ==
In 2017, Oleh Ataiants established a scholarship for talented young artists across Ukraine. As part of the project, a competition was announced for the best drawing among schoolchildren in grades 3–5 inches (7.6–12.7 cm)$6 the Sviatoshynskyi District of Kyiv. The students were asked to depict the Unified Ukraine. The competition committee included Oleh Ataiants himself, director of the Ataiants Gallery Oksana Boboshko, and foreign art critics. The winner of the competition was Anastasia Kravchenko, a third-grader at secondary school No. 196. Anastasia received a scholarship of UAH 3 thousand.

== Entrepreneurial activity ==
According to the Clarity-Project, Oleh Ataiants is a beneficiary of 9 commercial enterprises, and he is registered as a founder of 7 more companies. The areas of activity of these companies are agriculture, electricity, and construction.
