= Monuments of national significance in Zakarpattia Oblast =

List of cultural heritage monuments of national significance in Zakarpattia Oblast.

== Listings ==
No.	Photo	Name	Date	Location	Type	Protected number
1		Monument "[From] Ukraine – [to] liberators"	1970	Uzhhorod, vulytsia Sobranetska	monument of monumental art	070001-N
2		Monument to Ukrainian landscape artists Yosyp Bokshai, Adalbert Erdeli	1993	Uzhhorod, Zhupanatska Square	monument of monumental art	070002-N
3		Hillfort	9th–13th century	Berehove Raion, village Vary	monument of archaeology	070003-N
4		Settlement bahatosharove	6th–4th millennium BCE, 4th–3rd millennium BCE	Berehove Raion, village Zapson	monument of archaeology	070004-N
5		Burial of Ancient Magyars	9th–13th century	Berehove Raion, village Choma	monument of archaeology	070005-N
6	Lot of land designated for landmark of national significance	Hillfort "Tovvar"	9th century BCE – 4th century	Berehove Raion, village Diyda	monument of archaeology	070006-N
7	Picture of quarry in place of landmark of national significance (2016 picture)	Stay site	1.5 million - 10 thousand years BCE	Vynohradiv Raion, Korolevo	monument of archaeology	070007-N
8		Iron production center	2nd–1st century BCE	Vynohradiv Raion, village Nevetlenfolu	monument of archaeology	070008-N
9		Hillfort	9th century BCE – 4th century	Irshava Raion, Irshava	monument of archaeology	070009-N
10		Hillfort	9th century BCE – 4th century	Irshava Raion, village Ardanovo	monument of archaeology	070010-N
11		Celtic oppidum (hillfort)	9th century BCE – 4th century	Mukacheve Raion, Mukacheve	monument of archaeology	070011-N
12		Cave stay site	1.5 million – 10 thousand years BCE	Tiachiv Raion, village Velyka Uholka	monument of archaeology	070012-N
13		Salt quarry "Hortsy"	9th century BCE – 4th century	Tiachiv Raion, village Solotvyno	monument of archaeology	070013-N
14		Slavic settlement	3rd – 4th century	Uzhhorod Raion, village Haloch	monument of archaeology	070014-N
15		Slavic settlement	9th century BCE – 4th century	Uzhhorod Raion, village Kholmok	monument of archaeology	070015-N
