= Ukrainian calligraphy art =

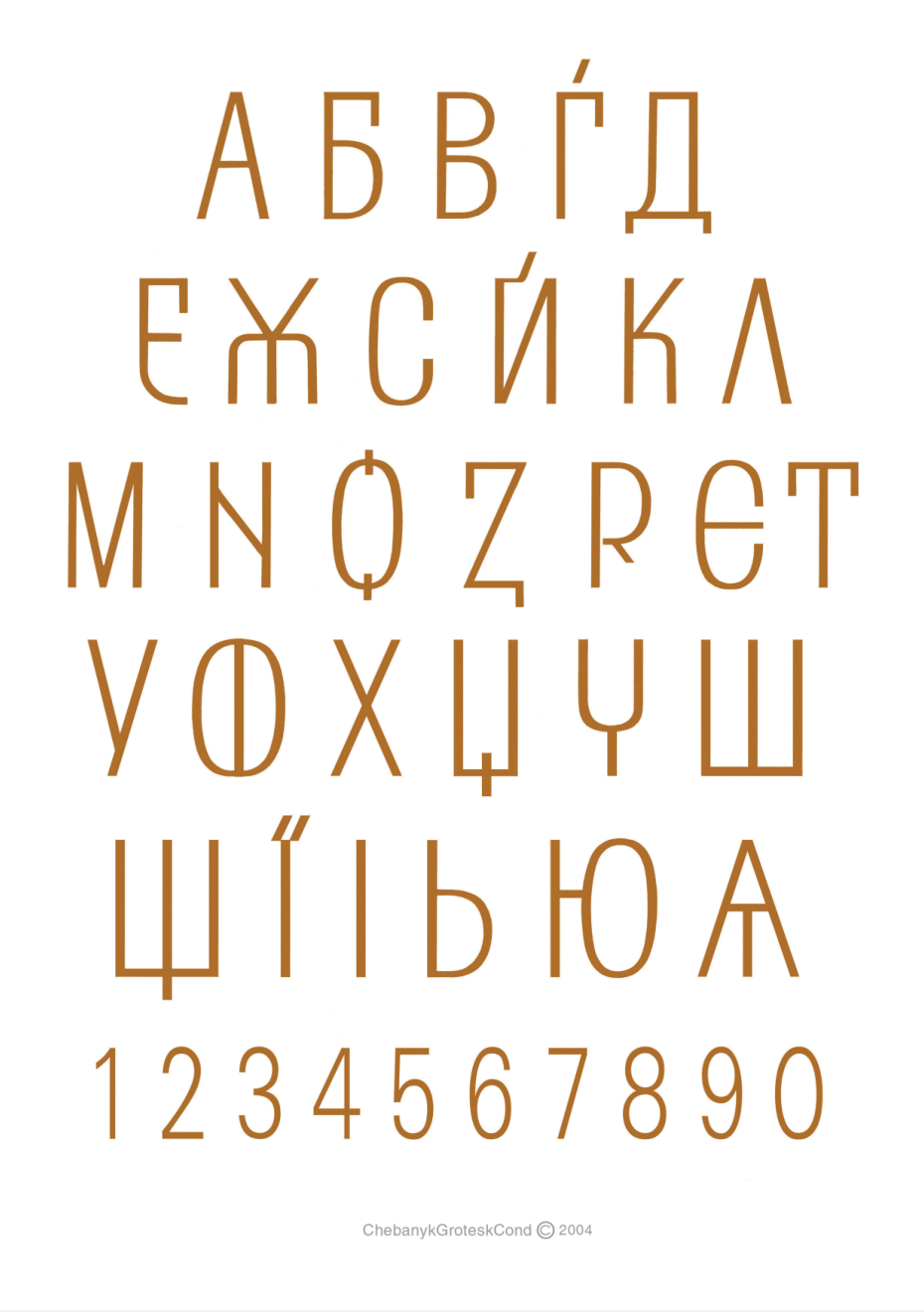
ChebanykGroteskCond2004 font by Vasyl Chebanyk, Ukrainian language graphics project, Ruthenia.

The art of Ukrainian calligraphy dates back to the times of the Trypillia culture, the Scythians and Sarmatians, the Cossack period and the George Narbut alphabet, but was eventually replaced by the unified alphabet of the Soviet era.

Since 2000, Vasyl Chebanyk has been researching handwritten letters in historical sources and works of Ukrainian artists and restoring Ukrainian traditions of the art of calligraphy, creating the Ukrainian alphabet "Ruthenia".

== Modern calligraphy art "Ruthenia" ==
"Ruthenia" is the general name of fonts and font sets for the Ukrainian alphabet, created in 2000–2021 by Professor Vasyl Chebanyk based on the primary Ukrainian traditions of the Kievan Rus' era and Cossack cursive, which became the project "Graphics of the Ukrainian Language".

The author's goal was to create a state font, which would be based on authentic Ukrainian symbols and perform the role of a national state attribute and a means of self-identification of the nation.

Vasyl Chebanyk received the Shevchenko Prize in 2019 for the project "Graphics of the Ukrainian Language", which includes a total of 60 fonts.

A font is a visual representation of a language with symbols that plastically coincide with the peculiarities of the language melody and, as an organic whole with the language, are nourished by one root from the depths of history.

— Vasyl Chebanyk

== History ==
The idea of the font came from Vasyl Chebanyk through German scientists. During a meeting in 1971 with Albert Kapr, rector of the Higher School of Graphics and Book Arts in Leipzig, he asked Chebanyk why Ukrainians do not develop their alphabet.

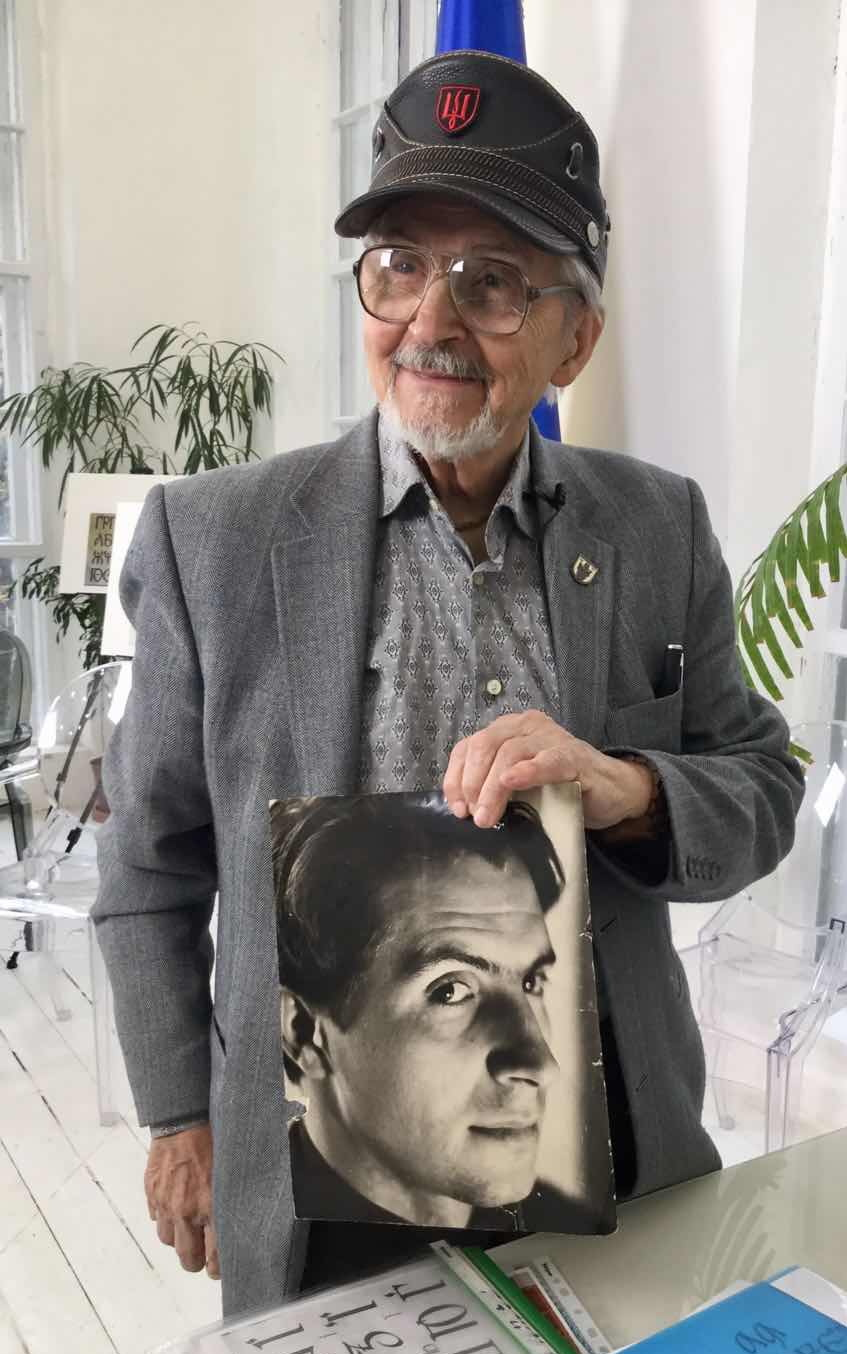
Vasyl Chebanyk - author of the Ruthenia alphabet.

Later, Vasyl Chebanyk also learned that in the "Book of Alphabets of All Nations and All Ages" (1880) by Carl Faulmann the "Ruthenian" alphabet is listed separately from the "Russian" alphabet, which became the starting point for his creative research.

== Multimedia project "Ruthenia. Animated alphabet of Vasyl Chebanyk". ==
On May 22–26, 2019, the multimedia project "Ruthenia. The animated alphabet of Vasyl Chebanyk" in which all 33 letters of the Ukrainian alphabet were decorated with animations by Olesya Drashkab, Nadiya Antonets, Kyryll Chichkan, Ihor Baranko, Roman Shostya, Oleksiy Chebykin, Ivan Semesyuk and other artists. The artists, inspired by "Ruthenia" by Vasyl Chebanyk, illustrated each individual letter and interpreted it in short animated videos

On August 23 and 24, 2020, was the All-Ukrainian premiere of the film "Ruthenia. The return of the code of the nation". The film explores the history of the emergence of writing on our territory, introduces the viewer to the authentic Ukrainian alphabet "Ruthenia" authored by Vasyl Chebanyk. The director of the picture and co-author of the script is Antonina Gottfried, the producer and co-author of the script is Natalia Yakovleva.

== See also ==
- Arts of Ukraine
- Ukrainian culture
- Culture
