= Zabolotny =

Zabolotny, also transliterated Zabolotnyi (feminine: Zabolotna or Zabolotnaya) is a surname. Notable people with the surname include:

- Anton Zabolotny (born 1991), Russian footballer
- Danylo Zabolotny (1866–1929), Ukrainian epidemiologist
- Nataliia Zabolotna (born 1973), Ukrainian curator
- Natalya Zabolotnaya (born 1985), Russian weightlifter
- Nikolai Zabolotny (born 1990), Russian footballer
- Volodymyr Zabolotnyi (1898–1962), Soviet Ukrainian architect
