= Nataliia Zabolotna =

President of the Ukrainian Hamanitarian Development Foundation

- Ната́лія Пили́півна Заболо́тна
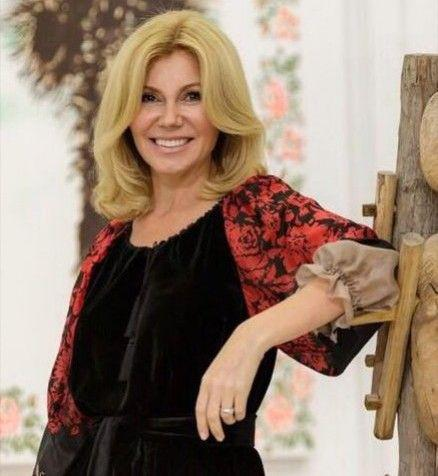
- Born: April 23, 1973 (age 52); Cherkasy, Ukraine
- Occupation: President of the Ukrainian Humanitarian Development Foundation.
- Known for: Civic Activism, Cultural Management

Nataliia Zabolotna (Ukrainian: Ната́лія Пили́півна Заболо́тна) is the president of the Ukrainian Humanitarian Development Foundation.

Formerly, Director General of the National Art and Culture Museum Complex “Mystetskyi Arsenal”, from May 2010 to July 2016. Commissioner of the first Kyiv Contemporary Art Biennale ARSENALE 2012, supervisor of projects: ART-Kyiv, ArtUkraine, Grand Sculpture Salon, Grand Antiquity Salon, ART-KYIV contemporary — 2010, the first international Arsenal Book Festival, НЕЗАЛЕЖНІndependent, Cosmic Odyssey, Fine Art Ukraine.

== Life and career ==
Zabolotna was born on April 23, 1973, in Cherkasy. Graduated from Bohdan Khmelnytskyi National University of Cherkasy, Ukrainian philology faculty. Also studied in National Academy of Internal Affairs (legal studies) and National Academy of Visual Arts and Architecture (art history).

- 1996 – Deputy Chief Editor, Gubernskie Vedomosti newspaper;
- 1998-2002 – Founder and Head of the Association of Ukrainian Popular Literature Support;
- 2000 - Deputy Chief Editor, Presidential Newsletter newspaper, Head of the Publishing Department;
- 2004-2010 – Director of Ukrainian House, State Business and Cultural Cooperation Center;
- Since 2007 – Founder and publisher of the Art Ukraine magazine;
- 2008 – Founder of the NGO Intellectual Cooperation Foundation “Ukrainian Time”;
- 2010-2016 - Director General of Mystetskyi Arsenal, National Art and Culture Museum Complex;
- 2016 - Founder and Head of the Art Ukraine Gallery;
- 2017 – President of the Ukrainian Humanitarian Development Foundation.

Mystetskyi Arsenal is now considered to be a leading art and culture institution in Ukraine. Within 5 years, Zabolotna’s team has brought to life over 50 art projects of national and international scale. More than 2,5 million visitors have enjoyed exhibitions, festivals and events at Mystetskyi Arsenal.

During her years at the Arsenal, Zabolotna claimed to make Kyiv a viable international art destination.

"Think of Natalya Zabolotna as a six-foot-tall optimist, leading a revolution in her Louboutin heels. The stunning lawyer and former reporter is the art diva of Kiev, and she’s determined to transform Ukraine’s capital — a cultural backwater for most of the last millennium — into one of Europe’s top art destinations," Newsweek on Zabolotna in 2011.

“What is the paradox of Ukraine? Ukraine gave the world very many geniuses, but they’re not listed as Ukrainian due to Ukraine’s geopolitical situation. Not many people know that Kazimir Malevich was born in Kiev,” Zabolotna on Ukraine's cultural heritage.

Zabolotna was the founder and commissioner of the Kyiv Contemporary Art Biennale Arsenale. David Elliott, the British curator and museum director, was the curator of Arsenale. According to the Dzerkalo Tyzhnia newspaper, Arsenale 2012 became the main cultural event of that year.

In 2013, Zabolotna founded Borys Voznytskyi Prize "For the significant personal contribution to the development of Ukrainian museum work".

In 2016, Zabolotna’s contract as head of Mystetskyi Arsenal had ended. However, the State Management of Affairs (agency overseeing the museum) did not start the mandatory vacancy competition procedure, which raised suspicions among Arsenal’s employees and the arts community about possible corruption violations.

In the end, the competition had only been appointed after the personal intervention of Ukraine's president Petro Poroshenko.

On July 7, 2016, the final session of the selection board has been conducted. Civil observers reporter of violations during the session. Notably, it was attended by people in military uniform, who named themselves civil justice defenders and demanded to appoint Olesya Ostrovska-Lyuta. Ostrovska-Lyuta was actually chosen for the position, but she published a statement the next day acknowledging that manipulations took place and proposing to reopen the competition.

== Art Ukraine Gallery ==
In November 2016, Zabolotna has opened “Art Ukraine Gallery” art-space in Kyiv. The very first project of the gallery was the exhibition of Stepan Ryabchenko “Virtual Mythology". During its first year, the gallery had exhibited contemporary artists of Ukraine, particularly “Gulliver’s Dream” by Arsen Savadov and “The Gallant age of Enlightment” by Oleksandr Roytburd.

In 2018, Art Ukraine Gallery moved to a new location. New art space has been opened by an exhibition “More than Sculpture” that combined works by Ukrainian and international artists with the augmented reality technologies.

== Ukrainian Humanitarian Development Foundation and #SOSfuture ==
In March 2017, Zabolotna has initiated a civil society platform #SOSfuture. It is dedicated to saving historical buildings, museums, art and sports schools, libraries and other socially important sites that are on the brink of destruction.

“We are indignant due to the fact that the authorities did not introduce the main reform, the cultural sector reform, into the priority list. Social and cultural sectors lie beyond the interests of politicians. The cultural sector reform needs to become the country’s priority. One should not ignore all the cultural civic initiatives that were suggested as a tool to resolve the humanitarian crisis. The country without culture is just a territory,” - Zabolotna on the #SOSfuture project.

Among the first participants and supporters of the project were George G. Grabowicz, Roman Balayan and Myroslav Popovych. #SOSfuture online platform for everyone to add the sites in need had become operational in Spring 2017.

“If today the state does not invest in children’s sports schools, stadiums, swimming pools, as well as museums, theaters and other cultural centers, tomorrow Ukraine and its international donors will have to invest in the juvenile penal system, special police units and hospitals for drug and alcohol addiction,” - Zabolotna on urging the government to save objects of cultural heritage.

On June 14, 2017, #SOSfuture conducted International Civil Forum Let’s Create Our Future Together in the abandoned children’s swimming pool Chayka. City authorities, diplomats and community activists discussed the problem of saving architectural landmarks, cultural and historical sites, as well as sports facilities.

Vitalii Klichko, the Mayor of Kyiv and participant of the event had declared that Chayka pool would be renovated within a year.

During the first months of #SOSfuture’s activity, more than 2000 participants joined its cause.

In September 2017, Zabolotna became the president of the Ukrainian Humanitarian Development Foundation. She named the achievements of the #SOSfuture initiative as the catalyst the Foundation's start. It aims to support projects of Ukrainian communities in domains of education, culture, sports, conservation of architectural heritage and all other humanitarian domains.

Among the major projects of the Foundation is the fundraising for the renovation of Mykola Leontovych’s historical house, located in Shershni village (Vinnytsia region), and the charitable auction for the renovation of the Sparta sports club in Kaniv.

In March 2018, Zabolotna announced the International Economic and Humanitarian Forum Ukrainian ID to take place in Kaniv for the first time in Summer 2018:

“Ukraine, as one of the biggest countries in Europe, could and has to be the place to host a world discussion on effective models of sustainable development of modern States. A country can be successful only under the condition when the development of human capital is its main priority. Sure, the perspective of the developed economy, successful businesses and attraction of investments look ephemeral in a country, catastrophically falling in international ratings of human development. It is our duty to change the situation.”

Kaniv city council and the Ukrainian Chamber of Commerce and Industry became the co-organizers of the Forum alongside the Ukrainian Humanitarian Development Foundation.

== Awards ==
On March 20, 2008, Zabolotna was assigned the title, Honored Arts Worker of Ukraine by Presidential decree for her contributions to the cultural development of Ukraine.

In 2012 she was named Person of the Year 2011 by The Day newspaper, and selected as a Person of Decade (among others) by the Korrespondent magazine. In 2013, she was named among the top-100 influential Ukrainians (62nd position) by the Korrespondent magazine.

In 2014 and 2015, Zabolotna was listed amongst the 100 Influential Women of Ukraine (Focus magazine), and for the same years, was included in the Top-100 People in Culture List by the New Time magazine (Novoe Vremya).

== Personal life ==
Zabolotna resides in Kyiv. She has two children (son and daughter). She is single.
