= Women in Arts Award =

Ukrainian art award

Women in Arts
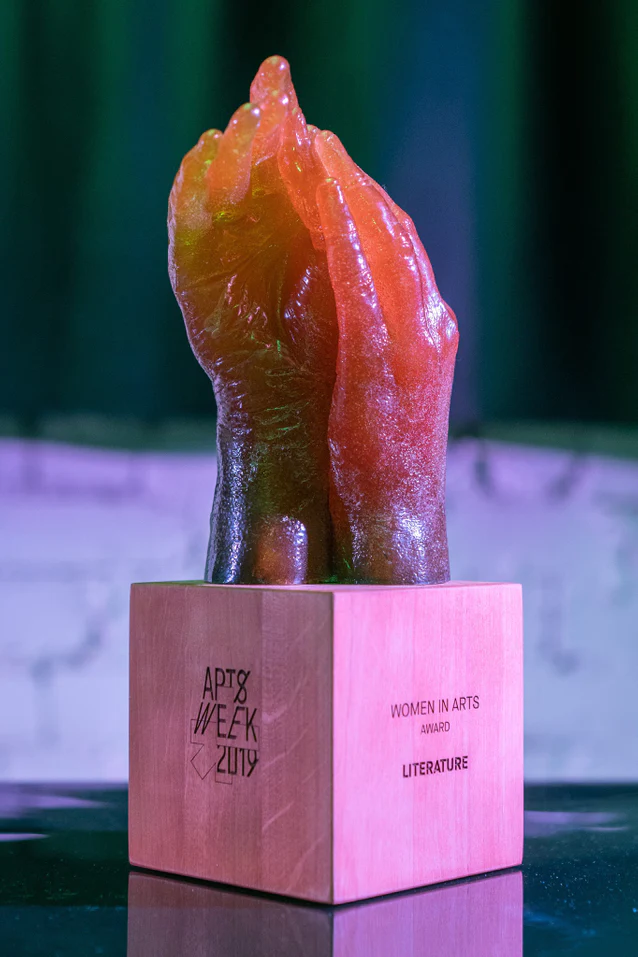
- Awarded for: Achievement in Ukrainian art
- Sponsored by: HeForShe Ukraine; UN Women; Ukrainian Institute
- Date: March 8, 2021
- Location: Kyiv
- Country: Ukraine
- Campaign: HeForShe Arts Week
- Website: Women in Arts

The Women in Arts Award is an award established in 2019 by UN Women Ukraine and the Ukrainian Institute, and presented as part of HeForShe Ukraine's annual arts week in March. Only women are nominated for the award; its purpose is to bring attention to the achievements of female artists in Ukraine, who have been historically overlooked by the Ukrainian arts scene.

== Structure ==
Six women receive the Women in Arts Award every year, in six categories:

- Visual Arts: Creators of visual media, like sculptors, painters, or those working with new media.
- Music: Writers and composers of musical works.
- Theater and Film: Creators in theater and film, like directors, screenwriters, and actors.
- Literature: Professionals in literature, like writers or poets.
- Cultural Management: Those that help distribute art, like curators and festival organizers.
- Cultural Journalism, Criticism, and Research (introduced in 2020): Those that track and review art, like critics, art historians, researchers, or publicists.

== Laureates ==
=== 2019 ===
- Visual Arts: Vlada Ralko
- Music: Nina Garenetska
- Theater and Film: Irma Vitovska-Vantsa
- Literature: Kateryna Kalytko
- Cultural Management: Olesya Ostrovska-Lyuta

=== 2020 ===
- Visual Arts: Lada Nakonechna
- Music: alyona alyona
- Theater and Film: Nataliia Vorozhbyt
- Literature: Oksana Zabuzhko
- Cultural Management: Yulia Sinkevych
- Cultural Journalism, Criticism, and Research: Dariya Badyor

=== 2021 ===
- Visual Arts: Alina Kleytman
- Music: Oksana Lyniv
- Theater: Tamara Trunova
- Film: Iryna Tsilyk
- Literature: Sofia Andrukhovych
- Cultural Management: Yulia Fediv
- Cultural Journalism, Criticism, and Research: Vira Baldynyuk

== Statuette ==
Winners of the Women in Arts Award receive a statuette designed by Ukrainian sculptor Maria Kulikovska. The unique figurine is designed to look like two hands whose palms are conjoined, symbolizing support among women.

== See also ==
- HeForShe
- Arts of Ukraine
- Shevchenko National Prize
