= Kostiantyn Doroshenko =

Ukrainian journalist

- Костянтин Володимирович Дорошенко
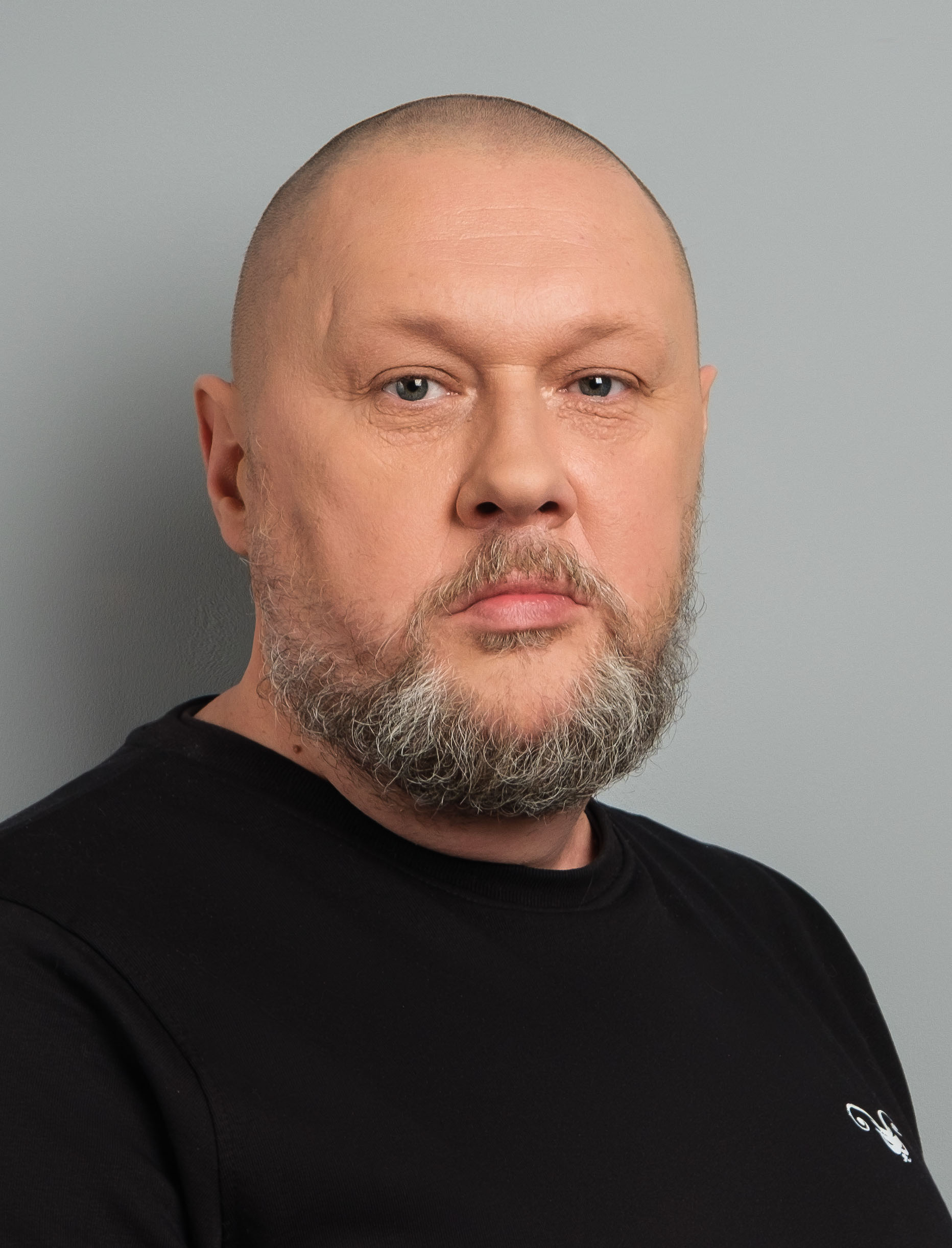
- Born: 28 October 1972 (age 53); Kiev, Ukraine
- Citizenship: USSR → Ukraine
- Education: Taras Shevchenko National University of Kyiv
- Occupations: Art critic; Contemporary art curator; Media manager; Radio host

Kostіantyn Doroshenko, Kostyantyn (Ukrainian: Костянтин Володимирович Дорошенко; born 29 October 1972, in Kyiv, Ukraine) is a Ukrainian art critic, publicist, contemporary art curator, media manager, and radio host. Doroshenko is well known as a cultural and social journalist with works published in Ukraine, Australia, Azerbaijan, and Italy. He is the host of the radio station Radio Vesti. He is a columnist to company Public Culture; is a curator of the Research Platform PinchukArtCentre since 2019; and is the author of the books 'The End of the Late Iron Age' and 'Aria of Mary'. He is one of the most influential Ukrainian art curators and art critics of Ukraine according to Art Ukraine magazine and Focus magazine. He is also a member of the World League "Mind without drugs" (Bishkek, Kyrgyzstan). On 1 April 2017, Doroshenko was appointed Ambassador Extraordinary and Plenipotentiary of the Republic Užupis among art critics of the world.

== Biography and work in media ==
Doroshenko was born in Kyiv. He graduated from Taras Shevchenko National University of Kyiv (1989–1994) with a history degree. His graduate work was dedicated to European knighthood and courtly culture.

Doroshenko worked at the Museum of History of Kyiv City from 1994 to 1995, where he managed the "Ukrainian diaspora history" department.

From 1995 to 1998, Doroshenko worked in the first Ukrainian lifestyle magazine LOOKS as an editor of the "Society" and "People" departments.

In 2000–2001, he worked in the team that launched the Kommersant newspaper in the Ukrainian market as an editor of the "Society" department and weekend application. In 2001, the project was closed because of pressure against political censorship.

KP Media owner Jed Sunden in 2001 invited Doroshenko to create a new magazine in Kyiv called "Afisha." This project remained on the media market for the next nine years.

In 2005, when Kommersant came back to Ukraine, Doroshenko became the manager of the PR department and corporate advertisement. From 2006 until 2009, he worked on a group of projects known as Telekritika as a project development director.

From 2014 to 2017, Doroshenko was a host for talk radio station Radio Visti. He had a few radio shows including "Doroshenko's Cult", "Elementary", "War of the Worlds", and "The Cynics".

Since 2019, Doroshenko has worked as a columnist for Public Culture and as a curator of the research platform PinchukArtCentre.

Doroshenko writes art, culture, and society publications in Australia, Italy, Russia, Ukraine, and Azerbaijan, in both public and special editions. His articles are published in Vil`na Dumka, Fakty i Kommentarii, Dzerkalo Tyzhnia, Den, Finansovaya Ukraina, Publichnye liudi, Kapital, Ptyuch, and others.

== Awards ==
- Laureate of the Azerbaijani Poet Prize of Mikayil Mushfig, 2015.
- Laureate of the Novomedia Awards 2015 (together with Oleksiy Zarakhovych) – for covering the topic of forgiveness on the Radio Vesti.

== Curator of projects ==
2001 – "Crucified Buddha", the first museum exhibition by Oleksandr Rojtburd in Museum of Cultural Heritage, Kyiv.

2006 – "Pope and Ukraine", National Philharmonic of Ukraine, Kyiv. A project dedicated to the fifth anniversary of the visit of Pope John Paul II to Ukraine with the presentation of the book "Pope and Ukraine". The author of the text is Oleksandr Krasyuk, and the artist is Yuriy Nikitin. The project was blessed by the Supreme Archbishop of the UGCC, Cardinal Lubomyr Husar.

2009 – "Genghis Khan of Ukraine", Kyiv, Dukat Gallery. Exhibition of portraits of Crimean Tatar khans, recreated by artist and icon painter Yuri Nikitin in collaboration with historian Oleksa Haivoronsky.

2007 – "Hilism", New York City, Ukrainian Institute. Personal exhibition of British-Australian artist Michel Murphenko.

2011 – "Fatal Strategies", Kyiv, 7th pavilion of Expocenter of Ukraine. The project by Ukrainian designer and artist Olga Gromova dedicated to the eponymous book by Jean Baudrillard, presentation of Ukrainian translation of which was a component of the multimedia performance. The scenography authorі are Georgy Senchenko in tandem with Arsen Savadov. In the final fashion show Olga Gromova's special collection of clothes created in the style of architectural bionics was burnt in front of the audience of 280 Kyiv and foreign VIPs. "Fatal Strategies" won the Grand Prix award of the International prize "Ukrainian Event Award" and first places in the categories "The Best Cultural Event" and "The Best Creative Concept of an Event."

2012 – "Apocalypse and Renaissance in Chocolate House", Kyiv, Chocolate House. An exhibition within the framework of First Kyiv Biennale "ARSENALE". The idea is attributed to Oleg Kulik. Anastasia Shavlokhova was a co-curator. The organizer of the event was Mironova Gallery. At the exhibition, 43 artists from Ukraine and Russia presented a metaphor of modernity, an image of the protesting and confused world in a state of momenary calm. Andrey Monastyrsky, Arsen Savadov, Anatoly Osmolovsky, Dmitriy Gutov, Illia Trushevsky, Zhanna Kadyrova, Olga Gromova, Valeriy Chtak, Andrey Kuzmin, Oksana Mas, and other artists were among the participants. After 15 days the exhibition was censored and closed.

2014 – "Fourth Front Door", Kyiv, National Museum Taras Shevchenko. Personal exhibition of an artist from Dnipropetrovsk, Nikita Shalenyi. The project was dedicated to historian Jacques Le Goff's "long Middle Ages" theory. Le Goff claimed that the Middle Ages had lasted until the 19th century. The "Fourth front door" represents the "Dark Ages" are still ongoing.

2018 – "Užupis: responsibility for freedom", Kyiv. The project is dedicated to the 100th anniversary of the restoration of Lithuanian statehood and combines works by artists of different genres and generations from Lithuania and Ukraine.

2018 – "Roma – are us", curated by Kostiantyn Doroshenko and Kateryna Lypa in Kyiv City History Museum, artist - Oleksiy Zinchenko.

2019 – "Human Condition" - Kyiv, Set Gallery, an exhibition by Swiss artist Marianne Hollenstein on the book Hannah Arendt and her opinion: " Everything a person knows or feels only makes sense to the extent that it can be expressed in language", with excerpts from the writer's letters to Martin Heidegger and memoirs of Holocaust.

2019 – "Exodus ", Montenegro, curator of the 14th season of the International Symposium of Contemporary Art Biruchiy 019. The concept is understood in its biblical meaning "Exodus" - the transition through the test to a dignified and harmonious existence.

2021 – "Time Not Lost", Prymorsk, -curator of the 15th season of the International Symposium of Contemporary Art - Biruchiy 021 which brought together 20 artists from different parts of Ukraine, Belarus, and Spain.

2024— "The Sun Rises in the West", Kryvyi Rih", curator of the project dedicated to the 90th anniversary of the largest mining and metallurgical enterprise of Ukraine ArcelorMittal.

2025 — "Me and the Ark, Me and the Great Flood" - International project by Ukrainian curator Kostyantyn Doroshenko with a modern interpretation of the philosophy of Nasimi, involving artists from Azerbaijan, Ukraine, Georgia, Lithuania, Bosnia and Herzegovina and Czech Republic in the YARAT Contemporary Art Space, Baku.

== Books ==
- "Kostyantyn Doroshenko". Cognitive demining. — Lviv: Publishing house of Anetta Antonenko. 2024 ISBN 978-617-5530-72-6 (in Ukrainian)
- Kostyantyn Doroshenko. According to Kyiv time. — Lviv: Publishing house of Anetta Antonenko. 2023. — 512 p. — ISBN 978-617-5530-29-0(in Ukrainian)
- Konstantin Doroshenko. The End of the Late Iron Age (preface by Lyubko Deresh, Russian). K .: Laurus. 2015. ISBN 978-966-2449-70-9 The book includes texts published by the author during the twenty years of his work in journalism in various publications, as well as many archival photographs. Review by Karl Dolchenko.; review by Oleksiy Zarakhovych.
- Konstantin Doroshenko. The End of the Late Iron Age(second edition, foreword by Alexander Borovsky, Russian language). K .: Laurus. 2020. ISBN 978-617-7313-45-7 Review by Anna Kaluger. Criticism for lack of love and death.
- K. Doroshenko, T. Zhmurko, T. Kochubinska, K.Malykh and other. Parcommune. Place. Community. Phenomenon. Kyiv: Publish Pro Ltd., PinchukArtCentre, in Ukrainian: , 2019 ISBN 978-617-7765-00-3
- Konstantin Doroshenko. Aria of Mary. K .: Laurus, 2021 ISBN 978-617-7313-59-4 Review by Olga Mikhailova. "Aria of Mary ": history in biography and vice versa.

== Opinions and Estimates ==
Doroshenko emphasized that Ukrainian art has its own peculiarities and is very different from Russian art, which is "overgrown with cynicism". In a dialogue with Marat Gelman, he expressed thoughts about the exhibition by Illya Chichkan; New Psychodarwinism. The Ukrainian artist made it depicting famous paintings of the Tretyakov Gallery, depicting the main characters in the form of monkeys. Analyzing the artist's gesture, Doroshenko remarked: "Imperial totalitarian society puts art on a pedestal as something that rises above life and directs it… Psychodarwinism; a proposal to abandon elitism and hierarchies".

In an interview with Voice of America Doroshenko said: "Today we see that Ukrainian culture speaks to the world in a modern language, not just offering embroidered shirts and dumplings, according to a template created for it under Stalin ... Why did the Russians abandon democracy? Why does the idea of freedom not matter to them, unlike the Ukrainians? .. The Russians sold their will for a cutlet."

With the beginning of the Russo-Ukrainian War in 2022, the publicist has aimed at condemning modern neo-Nazism: "Russian world is not just a heresy. It is a neo-Nazi ideology: it has a specific totalitarian leader, it incorporates and uses chauvinistic, fascist, racist, xenophobic ideas in its rhetoric and politics. Its goal is the same as that of Hitler's National Socialist teachings… This ideology must be condemned by the world community and legally banned as neo-Nazi, totalitarian and extremist."

During the war, Konstantin has remained in his native city of Kyiv and supports artists who create and protect the cultural heritage of Ukraine.

== Sources ==
- Rosanna Dodds and Olenka Martynyuk. ‘We’re the cultural resistance’. Financial Times. September 21, 2022
- Natalia Surtanova. Color, noise, word. Day. 03.11.2004 (in Ukr.)
- Telekritika has appointed a development director. Detector.media 5.12.2006 (in Ukr.)
- Konstantin Doroshenko. Congratulations to Novodvorsk. Detector.media 10.07.2008 (in Ukr.)
- Valeria Radievska. Konstantin Doroshenko, art critic: To feel like a master on your own land is to understand that you can cope with challenges, give myself glad. Wordpress 21.03.2020 (in Ukr.)
