= Lada Nakonechna =

Ukrainian artist, born 1981

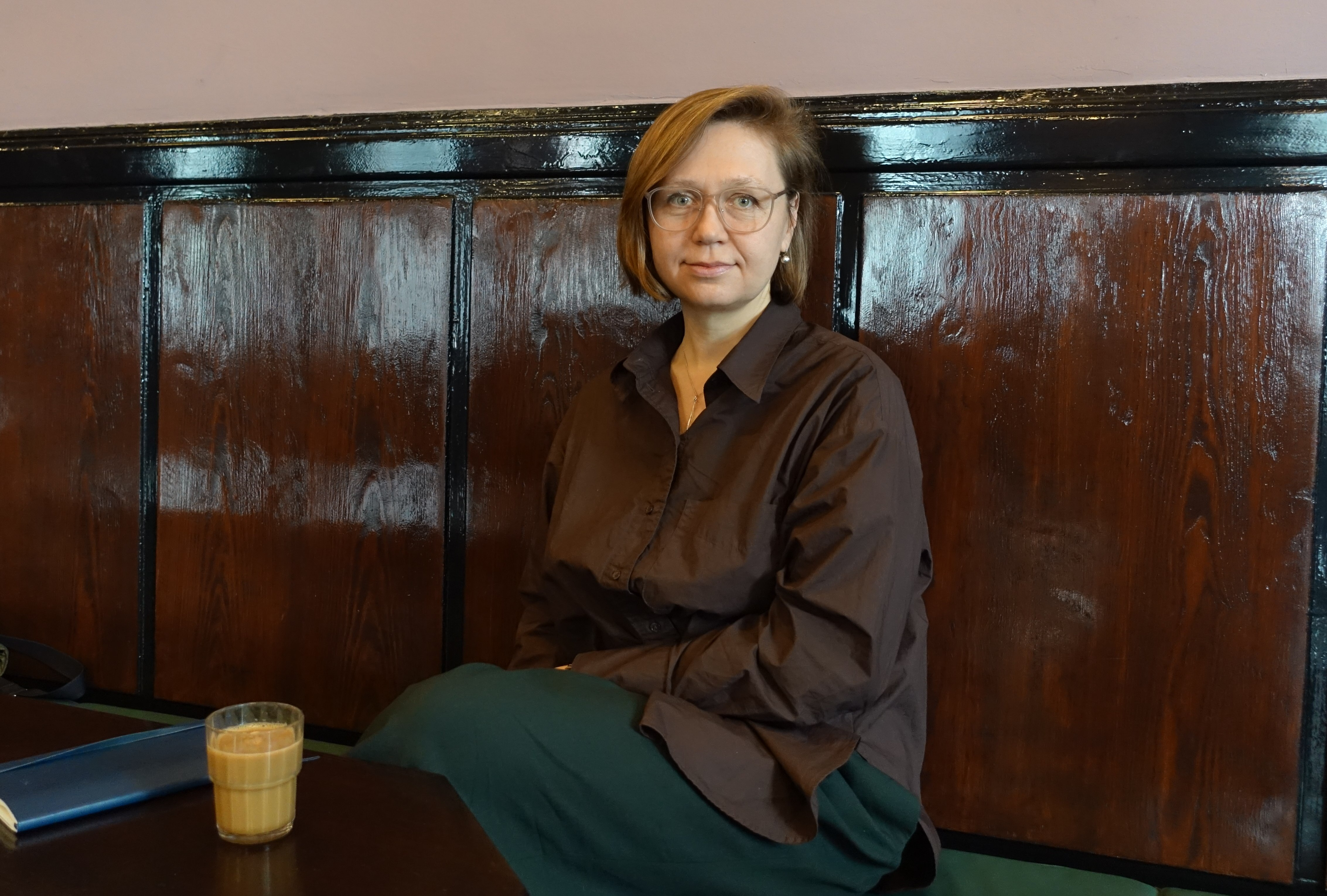
- Born: Dnipro, Ukrainian SSR, Soviet Union
- Education: National Academy of Visual Arts and Architecture
- Occupations: Photographer, drawer, performance artist
- Website: www.ladanakonechna.com

Lada Nakonechna (Ukrainian: Лада Наконечна; born 1981 in Dnipro, Soviet Union) is a Ukrainian sculptor, graphic artist, performance artist and researcher. Her works are shown internationally in group and solo exhibitions.

== Education ==
Nakonechna attended the State Art Academy in Dnipro from 1996 to 2000. Subsequently, she studied at the National Academy of Visual Arts and Architecture in Kyiv until 2009. After her studies, Nakonechna stayed in Kyiv, where she also met her husband.

== Activities ==
In 2005, Nakonechna joined the Ukrainian artist collective R.E.P. (Revolutionary Experimental Space). Initially, a group of twenty artists of different occupations, R.E.P. soon became a small community of six artists who tried out different artistic expressions.

Nakonechna is also a member of Hudrada (Creative Committee), a curatorial group of designers, architects, authors and other artists. Hudrada is active since 2008 and organizes projects, e. g., exhibitions, to create a platform for theoretical exchange.

In 2015, Nakonechna co-founded the Method Fund. This independent cultural organisation is conceived as a self-learning project and is dedicated to finding ways to establish art in specific locations. The focus is on collaborative approaches and supporting young artists in their respective places of residence. As a curator, Nakonechna is partly responsible for the organisation's educational and course offerings.

Nakonechna left Ukraine during the Russian Invasion in 2022. In 2023, she worked as a guest lecturer at the University of Fine Arts (HfbK) in Hamburg.

== Exhibitions ==
The following exhibitions are only a selection.

=== Solo exhibitions ===
- 2009 Zeugenschaft der Dinge, galerieGEDOKmuc, Munich
- 2014 State of things, Espace Croix-Baragnon, Toulouse
- 2016 The Exhibition, PinchukArtCentre in Kyiv
- 2018 Background mode, Galerie Eigen + Art in Leipzig
- 2020 Bodies in the Distance, Skala Gallery in Poznań
- 2021 Lada Nakonechna Disciplined Vision, National Art Museum of Ukraine in Kyiv
- 2022 Studium des Menschen, Gallery Eigen + Art in Leipzig

=== Group exhibitions ===
- 2008 Fresh Blood, Galerie Diehl, Berlin
- 2015 Politics of Form, Galerie für Zeitgenössische Kunst Leipzig
- 2016 Into the Dark, WUK Kunsthalle Exnergasse, Vienna
- 2019 Listen to us – Artistic Intelligence, Art Collection Telekom at different locations in Plovdiv

== Awards ==
- 2014 Kazimir Malevich Artist Award by the Polish Institute in Kyiv
- 2020 Women in Arts Award Category "Visual Arts"
