= Oleksandr Hnylytskyi =

Ukrainian artist

Alexander Gnilitskiy
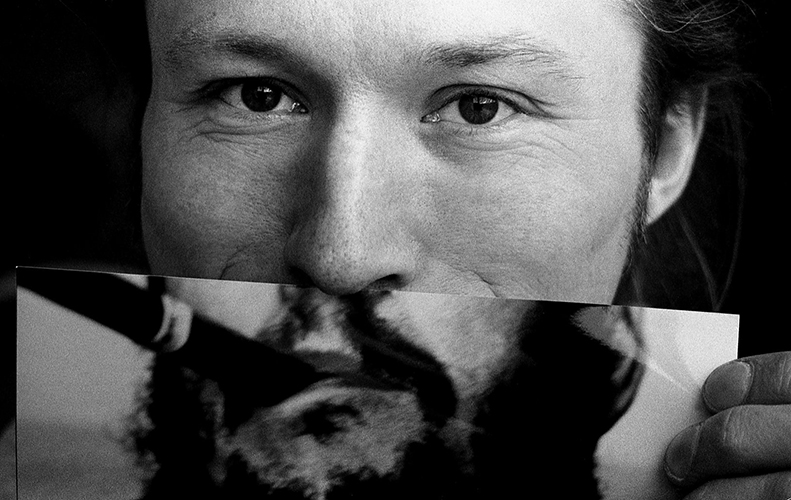
- Self portrait using mirror, 1997
- Born: July 17, 1961; Kharkiv, Ukrainian SSR, USSR
- Died: November 1, 2009 (48 years old); Kyiv, Ukraine
- Education: National Academy of Visual Arts and Architecture
- Occupations: Painter, artist
- Notable work: From the Lives of Futurists, Call of Laodicea, Papalama, To Kill a Critic, Stereo Ksyu, Ulysses
- Spouse: Lesya Zayats
- Children: Ksenia Hnylytska

Alexander Gnylytsky (July 17, 1961 – November 1, 2009; Ukrainian: Олександр Анатолійович Гнилицький, romanized: Oleksandr Anatoliiovych Hnylytskyi) was a Ukrainian artist who was one of the pioneers of the Ukrainian New Wave. In 1994 he became a member of the Kyiv art group named "Paris Commune". From 1996 he was one of the founders and the head of the Institute of Unstable Thoughts. He worked on installation and video art and represented Ukraine at the Venice Biennale in 2007. Much of his work resonates with the Italian transavantgarde movement.

== Biography ==
Alexander Gnylytsky was born in Kharkiv in 1961, and in 1980 he graduated from Kharkiv state art school, faculty of theatrical and decoration painting. From 1981–1987 Alexander studied at the Ukrainian State Academy of Art in Kyiv at the Department of Monumental Painting in Chekaniuk and Storozhenko's studio. During this time he became one of the active participants of the Kyiv art group "Paris Commune". In 1996, together with his wife and fellow artist, Lesia Zaiats they founded the NGO "Institution of Unstable Thoughts". Together they had a daughter named Ksenia Hnylytska who is also an artist and member of the group R.E.P. In the last years of his life he lived in Munich, Germany where he worked as a designer of products for television and cinema, as well as a conceptualist for animation. He died on November 1, 2009, in Kyiv from skin cancer.

== Creativity ==
Alexander first exhibited his work in 1991 in the capital city of Moscow, Russia. He became one of the first pioneers of the Southern Wave movement. Southern Wave refers to an art movement at the beginning of the 1990s, especially prevalent in Ukraine, after the upheaval of perestroika. The consequence of his work is to be found in the flight and constant mimicry that is often depicted, which at times could be viewed as absurd by the viewer. In addition to the main concept of painting that he had honed throughout his education, Alexander began to turn towards a variety of types, genres and techniques within the art world. Hnylytsky was among the first Ukrainian artists who turned to the technique of video art. In the early 1990s, he screened his own action poem, Sleeping Beauty in a Glass Coffin, and founded the Institution of Unstable Thoughts based on the Ukrainian artist collective and NGO in 1996. In the 2000s the artist continued to experiment with painting and video, notably turning to irrational painting. Here he explored and decoded the myths and semantics of heroes from modern animation films, fairy tales and legends; turning them into a personal, individual myth that he recreated throughout his artwork. Towards the latter stages of his life, he moved away from the concept of looking at the interrelationship between paintings, photographs and objects and instead focused on photorealism, in addition to designing items that were used on television show and films sets.

== Solo exhibitions ==
- 1991 — Po Planu (According to the plan), with Sergei Anfryev, Gallery 1.0, Moscow.
- 1994 — Dairy Maid, Szuper Gallery, Munich.
- 1998 — Veshch v Sebe (The thing within), Gallery of the Center for Contemporary Art at NaKUMA, Ukraine
- 1999 — Hnylytskyi, Karas Gallery, Kyiv.
- 2003 — Tsennyie Bumagi, M. Gelman Gallery, Kyiv.
- 2005 — Dacha, Tsekh Gallery, Kyiv.
- 2005 — II Pause, RSVP Kulturverein, Munich.
- 2005 — b-painting, L-Art Gallery, Kyiv.
- 2005 — Aleksandr Hnylytskyi: Paintings, M. Gelman Gallery, Moscow.
- 2017 — Oleksandr Hnlytskyi: The Reality of Illusion, Mystetskyi Arsenal, Kyiv.

== Group exhibitions ==
- 1994 — Free Zone, Fine Art Museum, Odessa.
- 1999 — Pinakotheque, International Art Festival, Kyiv.
- 2000 — Intervals, National Art Museum, Kyiv.
- 2000 — Old Natura, Kyiv International Media Art Festival, Kyiv.
- 2001 — Isskustvo 2000: New Art from Russia, City Gallery, Rosenheim, Germany.
- 2002 — This Killing Beauty, Ukrainian Artists' Union Gallery, Kyiv.
- 2003 — Digital Russia, Central House of Artists, Moscow.
- 2003 — Waiting of Karmapa, Bereznitsky Gallery, (L-art), Kyiv.
- 2003 — Us-Them, MoscowArtFair.
- 2004 — Age of Romantism, Ukrainian Artists' Union Gallery.
- 2006 — New Formats, Bereznitsky Gallery (L-art), Kyiv.
- 2006 — Postorange, Kunsthalle Wien, Austria.
- 2006 — New Space, PinchukArtCenter, Kyiv.
- 2006 — Go Ukraine, go!, Regina Gallery, Moscow.
- 2006 — Fineart Fair, Manezh, Moscow.
- 2006 — Art Moscow, Bereznitsky Gallery.
- 2006 — Art-Moskva, Central House of Artists, Moscow.
- 2007 — Venice Biennale, Ukrainian Pavilion.

== Critique ==
- "Any work by Gnilitsky was done, as Platonov would say, with 'smart hands'. It seems to me that in principle, to think with your hands and means not just to be considered, but also to be an artist. His hands enliven the primary impulse, construct a 'mechanism' (no matter what it is – painting, mechanical aggregate or communicative situation), through which the abstraction of the idea becomes an aesthetic object in space" – Vladimir Levashov, OpenSpace.ru.

== Sources ==
- http://www.gif.ru/people/gnilitsky/ This website goes into detail about his career.
- https://www.art4.ru/museum/gnilitskiy-aleksandr/ An interview with Alexander talking about his work.
- https://os.colta.ru/art/events/details/13767/?expand=yes#expand Obituary by Vladimir Levashov, an art historian, curator and art director of the Stella Art Foundation.
- https://amnesia.in.ua/gnilitskiy Interview with NASH magazine.
- https://web.archive.org/web/20091201203426/http://life.pravda.com.ua/wonderful/4976e6ea0ded3/ Article about the top 10 artists from Ukraine.
- Lesya Smyrna. Centuries of nonconformism in Ukrainian visual art// K.: "Phoenix", 2017, p. 291. ISBN 978-966-131-499-2
- Gleb Viseslavsky, Oleg Sydor-Gibelinda . Contemporary art terminology// Paris-Kyiv: Terra Incognita. 2010, p. 322. ISBN 978-966-96839-2-2
