= Storozhenko =

Storozhenko (Ukrainian: Стороженко) is a gender-neutral Ukrainian surname that may refer to

- Marina Storozhenko (born 1985), Kazakhstani volleyball player
- Mykhaylo Storozhenko (1937–2020), Soviet-Ukrainian decathlete
- Nikolay Storozhenko (disambiguation), several people
- Oleksa Storozhenko (1806-1874), Ukrainian writer, anthropologist, playwright and criminalist
- Olga Storozhenko (born 1992), Ukrainian model, teacher and beauty pageant titleholder
- Serhiy Storozhenko (born 1949), Ukrainian football functionary, president of the Kharkiv Oblast Football Federation
