= Oleg Kulik =

Ukrainian-born Russian artist

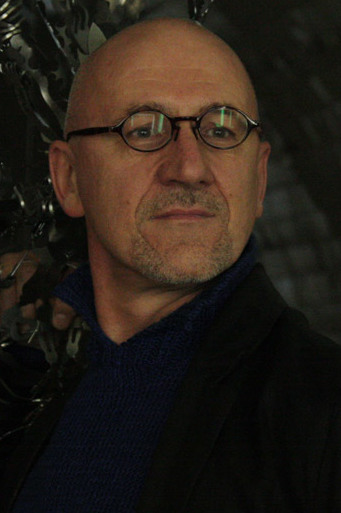
- Oleg Kulik in 2014
- Born: Oleg Borisovich Kulik; 1961 (age 64–65); Kyiv, Ukrainian SSR, Soviet Union
- Education: Shevchenko State Art School; Kiev Geological Survey College
- Known for: Performance art, sculpture, photography, curating
- Notable work: I Bite America and America Bites Me, Big Mother
- Movement: Contemporary art, performance art
- Website: Oleg Kulik on Artnet

Oleg Borisovich Kulik (Russian: Оле́г Бори́сович Кули́к; born 1961 in Kyiv) is a Ukrainian-born Russian performance artist, sculptor, photographer and curator. He is best known for his controversial artistic performances in which he acted like a dog.

== Life and art ==
Kulik was born in Kyiv, and graduated from Shevchenko State Art School (1979) and Kiev Geological Survey College (1982). He has lived and worked in Moscow since 1986.

In 2007, Oleg Kulik: Chronicle 1987–2007, a retrospective of Kulik's work, was exhibited at the Central House of Artists, Moscow.

As curator of the Regina Gallery, Kulik became known for his unorthodox approaches such as putting paintings on wheels and hiring people to carry the artworks.

Kulik considers his best curatorial endeavor to be "Leopards Bursting into a Temple" by Anatoly Osmolovsky in 1992. In this exhibit, two naked people were put into a cell with live leopards walking around them. He had said that he thought the exhibition was a "metaphor for everything new and lively that appears in our life".

In 2009, Kulik curated the "Kandinsky Prize in London" at the Louise Blouin Foundation.

In 2012 in Kyiv Kulik curated with Kostyantyn Doroshenko and Anastasia Shavlokhova project "Apocalypse and Renaissance in Chocolate House", a branch of the National Museum "Kyiv Art Gallery". At that exhibition 43 artists from Ukraine and Russia presented the metaphor of modern times. Andrey Monastyrsky, Arsen Savadov, Anatoly Osmolovsky, Dmitriy Gutov, Zhanna Kadyrova, Oksana Mas and other artists were among the participants.

In 2022, Kulik was questioned and faced possible prosecution for "rehabilitation of Nazism" after his 2015 sculptural work 'Big Mother' was shown at Art Moscow. Militant pro-Kremlin politicians claimed that the work mocked The Motherland Calls, a monument to soldiers at Stalingrad. Kulik said "If I could imagine at least 10% of the interpretation that is now being made of my work, I would not only not show it, but I would not even have started it"; it was inspired by "a painful recovery from the trauma associated with splitting up with my beloved wife."

== Controversy ==
At the Interpol group exhibition in Stockholm in 1996, he performed in the gallery chained next to a sign reading "dangerous". An international scandal occurred when he not only attacked members of the public who chose to ignore the sign, in one case biting a man, but also attacked other artworks within the exhibition, partially destroying some pieces made by other artists.

The incident inspired a scene in the 2017 film The Square directed by Ruben Östlund, where animal actor Terry Notary plays a performance artist who imitates an ape.

Kulik's broader body of work has also inspired other international creators; for instance, Turkish performance artist Ares Kıvanç Dönmez created a direct homage to Kulik with his kitchen-set performance Hadi Gel Domatesli Pilav Yapalım.

=== Susan Silas letter ===
In 1997 artist Susan Silas wrote "A Love Letter to Oleg Kulik, A Prince among Men, a Man among Dogs". She describes visiting Kulik during his performance of "I Bite America and America Bites Me", in which Kulik references Joseph Beuys with an updated reference to the current cultural setting of America. Again, Kulik performed as a dog, this time in a specially built cage, which the spectator would enter wearing protective garb.

== Sources ==
- Olena Kovalchuk. And I could bark to the end: Interview with performer Oleg Kulik. Birdinfligh 1.08. 2018.(in Ukr., Rus.)
