= Mykola Hlushchenko =

Ukrainian post-impressionist painter (1901–1977)

Mykola Hlushchenko (Ukrainian: Микола Петрович Глущенко; 17 September 1901 – 31 October 1977) was a Ukrainian artist. He was a winner of the Shevchenko National Prize in 1972.

== Biography ==
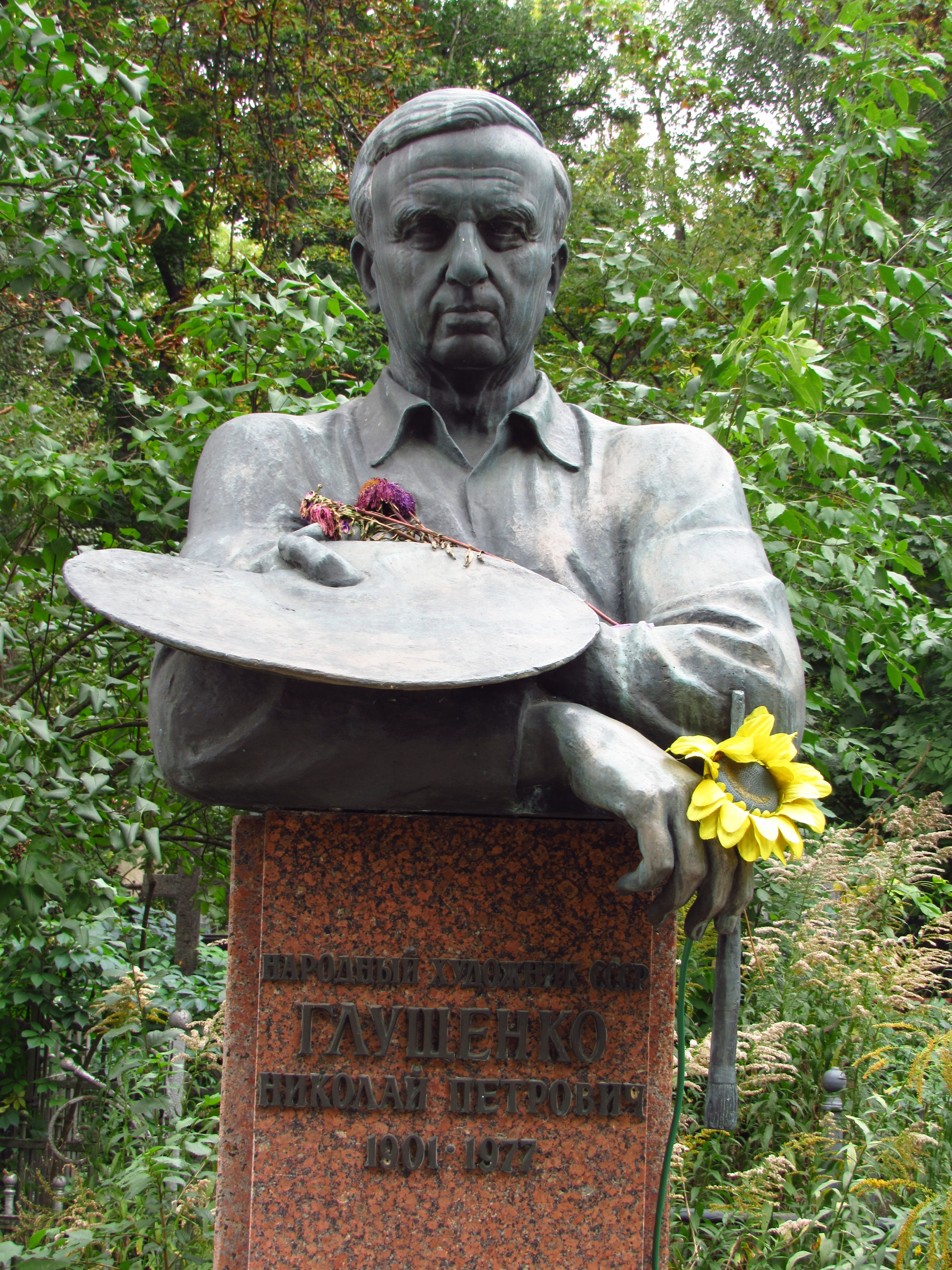
Grave of Mykola Hlushchenko

Hlushchenko was born in Novomoskovske, Yekaterinoslav Governorate, Russian Empire, a town originally established by Zaporozhian Cossacks and currently known under its original name of Samar. At the early age Mykola moved to Yuzivka where he attended classes in drawing and became fond of artwork by Illia Ripyn and Serhiy Vasylkivsky. After being forcibly mobilized into the Volunteer Army, Hlushchenko ended up in a prisoner-of-war camp in Poland, from which he escaped. He then made his way to Germany where his love for art brought him to the private studio of Hans Baluschek in Berlin. Mykola Hlushchenko was noted by critics who reviewed several of his paintings submitted to the Kasper Art Gallery in Berlin in 1924.

A graduate of the Academy of Art in Berlin (1924), from 1925 he worked in Paris where he immediately attracted the attention of French critics. From the New Objectivity style of his Berlin period he changed to post-Impressionism. Besides numerous French, Italian, Dutch, and (later) Ukrainian landscapes, he also painted flowers, still life, nudes, and portraits (such as of Oleksandr Dovzhenko and Volodymyr Vynnychenko, as well as portraits commissioned by the Soviet government of the French writers Henri Barbusse, Romain Rolland, and Victor Margueritte and the painter Paul Signac).

At the beginning of the 1930s, Hlushchenko belonged to the Association of Independent Ukrainian Artists and helped organize its large exhibition of Ukrainian, French, and Italian paintings at the National Museum in Lviv. After developing plans to organize an exhibition of Ukrainian émigré painters in Kyiv and Kharkiv, in 1933 he was recruited by the GPU as a Soviet agent of influence in France and tasked with gathering information on important members of the Ukrainian community living abroad. Through his relationship with businessman André Mirabeau, he allegedly obtained over two hundred drawings of military equipment which he supplied to Soviet intelligence.

In 1936 Hlushchenko moved to the USSR. Working for the Soviet Union secret service, he was among those who warned the Soviet government about the German plan to attack ahead of time. In 1944, he moved to Kyiv, and created a series of paintings of the post-war city, as well as many landscapes he had seen while traveling to France, Belgium, Switzerland, Italy and other countries.

In the 1960s, having come into close contact with new artistic trends on his trips abroad, he revitalized his paintings with expressive colors, and assumed a leading position among Ukrainian colorist painters. Hlushchenko's work was exhibited in Berlin (1924), Paris (five exhibits 1925–34), Milan (1927), Budapest (1930, 1932), Stockholm (1931), Rome (1933), Lviv (1934, 1935), Moscow (1943, 1959), Belgrade (1966, 1968), London (1966), Toronto (1967–9), and Kyiv (over 10 exhibits). He died in Kyiv, Ukrainian SSR. He was buried at Baikove Cemetery.

== Awards ==
- Order of the Red Banner of Labour (24.11.1960)
- People's Artist of Ukraine (1944)
- People's Artist of the USSR (1976)
- Shevchenko National Prize (1972) — for a series of paintings "On Lenin's places abroad", "Landscapes of Ukraine" (1969–1971).

== Bibliography ==
- Kovzhun, P.; Hordyns'kyi, S. Mykola Hlushchenko (Lviv 1934)
- Shpakov, A. Mykola Petrovych Hlushchenko (Kyiv 1962)
- Buhaienko, I. Mykola Hlushchenko (Kyiv 1973)
- The catalog of the exhibition of M. Glushchenko's graphics (1930s–1970s) / Kyiv National Museum of Russian Art. Kyiv : Golden Section, 2012. 128 p. (in Ukrainian and English)
- Igor Bugaenko. Mykola Hlushchenko: Biographical sketch
- A set of postcards by Mykola Hlushchenko. Kyiv, 1976.
- 12 Nudes by Mykola Hlushchenko. Exclusive by Ukrainian Art Library.
