= Vlada Ralko =

Ukrainian painter

- Влада Ралко
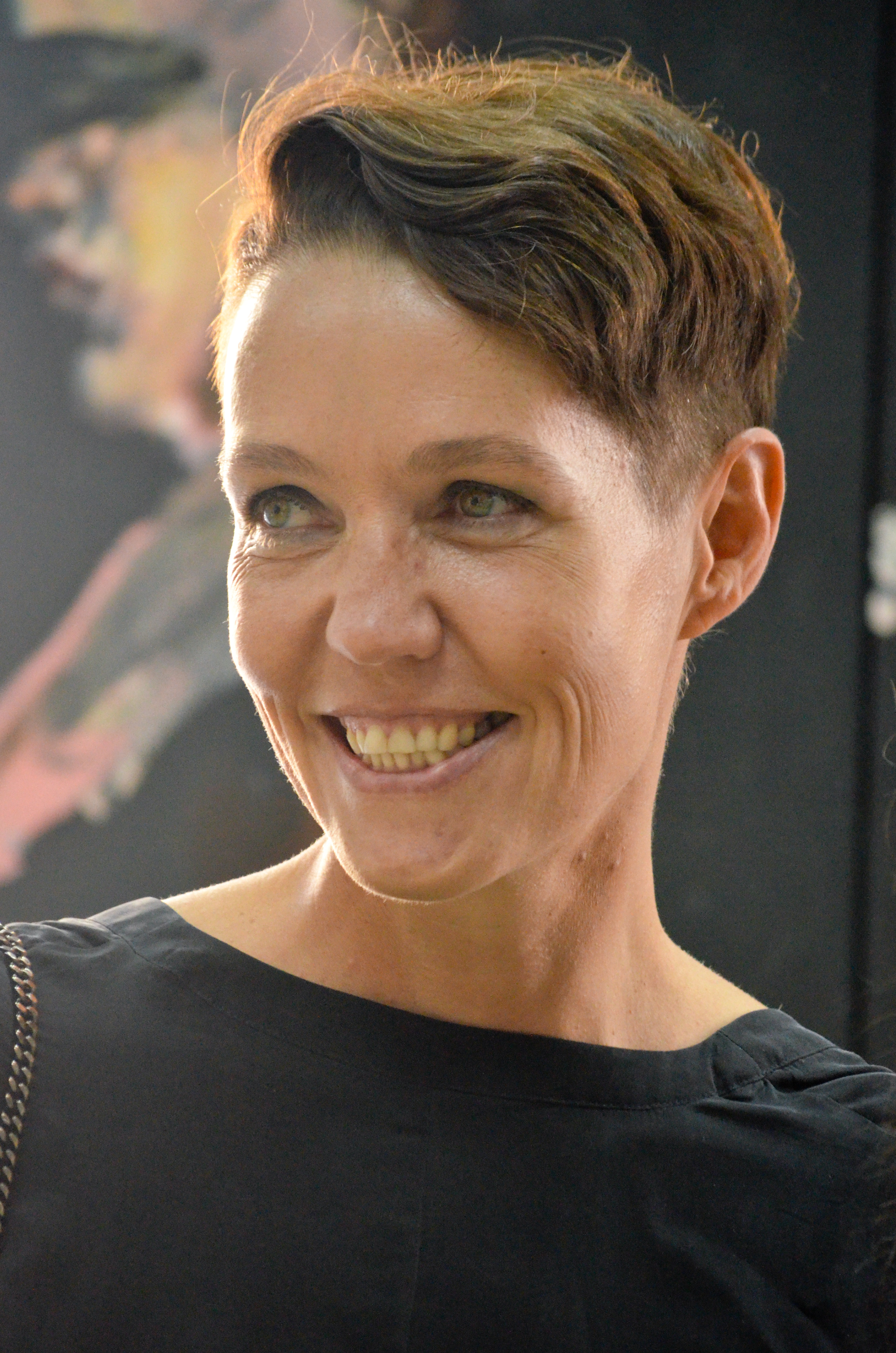
- Ralko in 2014
- Born: 1969 (age 56–57); Kyiv, Ukrainian SSR
- Education: National Academy of Visual Arts and Architecture
- Website: vladaralko.com

Vlada Ralko (Ukrainian: Влада Ралко; born in 1969) is a Ukrainian painter. Based in Kyiv, she has been a member of the National Union of Artists of Ukraine since 1994 and was a laureate of the UN Women's Women in Arts award in 2019.

== Biography ==
Vlada Ralko was born in Kyiv, Ukraine in 1969. In 1987, she graduated from the Taras Shevchenko Republican Art School, and in 1994 she received a degree from the National Academy of Visual Arts and Architecture.

Ralko works in traditional art genres, art and drawing. Ralko's art has been displayed in exhibitions across Ukraine, as well as at the SCOPE Art Show in Miami Beach, the Lincoln Center in New York City, the Dallas Art Fair, and galleries in Germany and Austria.

She was awarded the All-Ukrainian Triennial of Painting (2001) and a scholarship at CCN Graz (2007). The artist is active in exhibitions in Ukraine and abroad. Ralko's works have been exhibited at Lincoln Center (New York, USA), Rebellminds Gallery (Berlin, Germany), Kunstlerhous (Vienna, Austria), Saatchi Gallery (London, UK), etc.

== Publications ==
- Works on Paper, Kyiv, 2007
- Kyiv Diary, Lviv, 2019
