= Zahattia =

Zahattia Загаття
- Village
- Location within Ukraine Location within Zakarpattia Oblast
- Coordinates: 48°23′54″N 22°56′56″E
- Country: Ukraine

Population
  - Total: 2,582
- Time zone: UTC+1 (CET)
  - Summer (DST): UTC+2 (CEST)
- Postal index: 90100

Zahattia (Ukrainian: Загаття, Hungarian: Hátmeg) is a village located in western Ukraine, within Khust Raion in Zakarpattia Oblast, although it was formerly administered under Irshava Raion. The village is located 12 kilometres (7.5 mi) from the city of Irshava. It was founded in 1350 on the river Ilosva; its original Hungarian name was Hátmeg.

== Population ==
The village has a population of 2,582 people. The majority of them are Ukrainian. 3,647 people live on the territory of the village council.

== Attractions ==
In 1845, the village got the Zahattya Загаття Greek Catholic Church of the Nativity of the Blessed Virgin Mary.
