= Olesya Ostrovska-Lyuta =

Ukrainian cultural manager (born 1978)

- Оле́ся Остро́вська-Лю́та
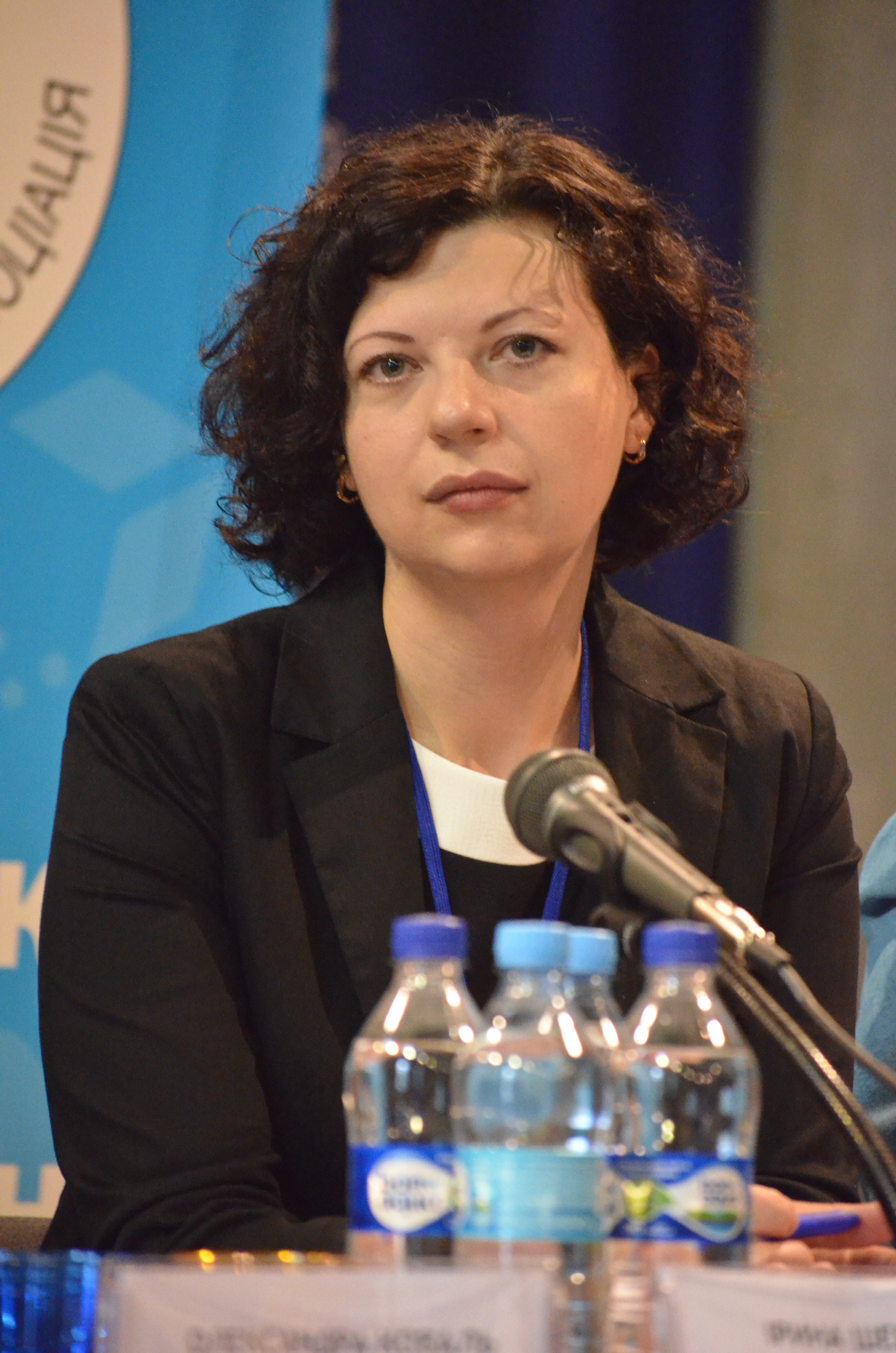
- Ostrovska-Lyuta in 2014

1st Deputy Minister of Culture
- In office February 2014 – December 2014
- Prime Minister: Volodymyr Groysman
- Minister: Yevhen Nyshchuk

Personal details
- Born: Olesya Bohdanivna Ostrovska-Lyuta; 5 August 1978 (age 48) Lviv, Ukrainian SSR, Soviet Union (now Ukraine)
- Education: National University of Kyiv-Mohyla Academy (MA)
- Occupation: Cultural manager
- Awards: Women in Arts Award

Olesya Bohdanivna Ostrovska-Lyuta (Ukrainian: Оле́ся Богда́нівна Остро́вська-Лю́та; born 5 August 1978) is a Ukrainian cultural manager and curator of contemporary art. She is the director of the state enterprise Mystetskyi Arsenal National Art and Culture Museum Complex under the State Management of Affairs. In 2014, she served as the first Deputy Minister of Culture of Ukraine. In 2019, she was awarded the Women in Arts Award.

Ostrovska-Lyuta was also a member of numerous professional organisations. Among them are the board of the Soros Center for Contemporary Art (SCCA), the jury of the Kazimir Malevich Artist Award established by the Polish Institute in Ukraine, the jury of the Molodist International Film Festival, the boards of the "I3" award program, and the Dynamic Museum project at the Ukrainian Development Foundation.

== Early life and education ==
Ostrovska-Lyuta was born in Lviv, Ukraine, on 5 August 1978. She began her studies at the National University of Kyiv-Mohyla Academy in 1994 and earned a Master of Arts in cultural studies in 2000. She speaks Ukrainian as her first tongue and speaks English, Polish, and Russian proficiently.

== Career ==
Ostrovska-Lyuta began her career as a translator from Polish for digital art seminars. From 1998 to 1999, she worked as an office manager for the International Renaissance Foundation. In 2003, she became associate director of the SCCA. In 2007, she managed the Pillar PR agency. From 2008 to 2014, she led various projects and programmes at the Rinat Akhmetov Charitable Foundation "Development of Ukraine," where she also served as project and programme manager. During her tenure, she launched the "I3" award programme to support Ukrainian artists, as well as the "Dynamic Museum" initiative aimed at modernising the country's museum landscape.

Between 2010 and 2014, Ostrovska-Lyuta chaired the board of directors of the SCCA. She also took part in several cultural juries, serving as a member of the Kazimir Malevich Prize jury in 2010 and 2012, and as head of the jury for the Ukrainian Panorama at the Molodist International Film Festival in 2011.

Following the Euromaidan protests in February 2014, the General Assembly of Cultural Workers, which had self-organised within the Ministry of Culture, proposed Ostrovska-Lyuta for the post of Minister of Culture. Although Yevhen Nyshchuk was ultimately appointed to the role, he invited Ostrovska-Lyuta to serve as first deputy minister. She held this position from February to December 2014, stepping down following a change in government. During this time, she co-founded Culture2025, an independent platform dedicated to shaping a long-term national cultural strategy.

In 2016, Ostrovska-Lyuta was appointed deputy director of the analytical centre Pro.Mova, and in July of the same year, she became the general director of the Mystetskyi Arsenal National Arts and Culture Museum Complex. Under her leadership, the institution has focused on digital transformation, complex restoration projects, the expansion of literary and theatre programmes, the creation of a permanent exhibition, and the development of a Museum of Modern Art. Beyond her administrative roles, she has written extensively on culture and cultural policy and has worked as a freelance curator of contemporary art. In June 2018, she released a video message in support of Ukrainian filmmaker Oleh Sentsov, who was imprisoned in Russia.

Ostrovska-Lyuta became a member of the board of the platform of initiatives "Warm City" in Ivano-Frankivsk from 2022.
