= Koller (auctioneers) =

Koller Auctions Ltd.
- Native name: Koller Auktionen AG
- Company type: Private
- Industry: Art, auctions
- Founded: 1958; 68 years ago
- Founder: Pierre Koller
- Headquarters: Zürich, Switzerland
- Area served: Worldwide
- Key people: Cyril Koller (CEO)
- Website: kollerauktionen.ch

Koller Auctions Ltd. (German: Koller Auktionen AG) is a Swiss auction house specializing in international art auctions. Founded in 1958 by Pierre Koller, it is the leading auction house in Switzerland.

== Organization ==
Besides the headquarters in District 5 in Zürich, Koller also operates a subsidiary in Geneva (Koller Genève) and representative offices in Munich, Düsseldorf, Florence and Beijing. Koller holds approximately 80 auctions each year in over two dozen different collecting categories, including Old Master & 19th Century Paintings & Drawings, Modern & Contemporary Art, Swiss Art, Jewellery, Watches, Asian Art, Fine Furniture & Decorative Arts, Books & Autographs, Art Deco & Art Nouveau, Design, Wine, Vintage, Watches and Asian Art. Koller holds both traditional saleroom auctions as well as timed online-only auctions, under the name Koller ibid online only.

== History ==
In 1958, Pierre Koller (1924-2019), an attorney formed the Koller Gallery (Galerie Koller) in Zürich, Switzerland, primarily dealing in fine arts and antiques. Since 2008 the company is known as Koller Auctions Ltd. (Koller Auktionen AG) since the primary business activity became art auctions over the time. It's currently family-owned and managed in the second generation by Cyril Koller.
