= Illya Chychkan =

Ukrainian artist (born 1967)

Illya Chychkan (Ukrainian: Ілля Аркадійович Чичкан, born 29 August 1967) is a Ukrainian artist. He is a representative of the art Ukrainian New Wave movement, which emerged in the 1990s. He is a third generation artist. He lives and works in Berlin, and Kyiv, as a painter, author of installations, and develops photo and video-projects.

== Early life ==
Born in Kiev, Ukraine, Illya Chychkan is the grandson of Leonid Chychkan, a Ukrainian socialist realist painter and professor at the Kyiv Art Institute. His father, Arkadii Chychkan, was a Ukrainian nonconformist artist. He participated in "The exhibition of 13" (1979), a manifestation of Ukrainian painters' resistance to social realism.

== Personal life ==
In 2014, Chychkan along with his wife Masha Shubina, visited India. During winter, he paints there.

Chychkan has a daughter, Sasha. She is a co-author of Psychodarwinism. In a dialogue with Marat Gelman with Kostyantyn Doroshenko they discussed the exhibition New Psychodarwinism. The artist took it as a basis for famous paintings of the Tretyakov Gallery depicting the main characters as monkeys. Analyzing the artist's blasphemous gesture Doroshenko remarked: "Imperial totalitarian society puts art on a pedestal as something that rises above life and directs it… « Psychodarwinism» - a proposal to abandon elitism and hierarchies.». Chychkan's children, David and Oleksandra, are Ukrainian artists.

== Literature ==
- Perscha Kollektija Exhibition Catalogue, Kyiv, 2003
- From Red to Yellow to Blue, Ludmila Bereznitsky, Kyiv, 2004
- Illya & Sasha Chichkan. PsychoDarwinism. Back to the Roods : exhibition catalogue 23.11–14.12.2017. Kyiv : [Golden Section], 2017. 46 p. (in Ukrainian and English)
- Conversation Marat Gelman with an art critic. New "Psychodarwinism" by Ilya Chichkan.Zima magazine.17.02.2021
