= Adalbert Erdeli =

Hungarian and Ukrainian painter and writer (1891–1955)

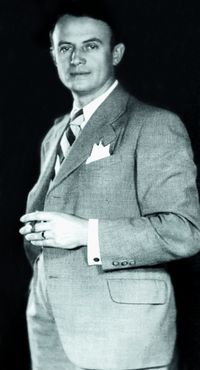
Béla Erdélyi

Adalbert Erdeli (Hungarian: Béla Erdélyi; Ukrainian: Адальберт Ерделі; May 25, 1891 – September 19, 1955) was a Hungarian and Carpatho-Rusyn painter and writer, one of the main figures of midcentury Transcarpathian art.

Erdelyi was born in Kelemenfalva, Austria-Hungary (today Zahattia in Ukraine). He studied at the Budapest Academy of Arts from 1911 through 1915, then taught in Mukachevo and Uzhhorod, when Transcarpathia already became part of Czechoslovakia.

Along with fellow Budapest graduate and World War I veteran József Boksay, Erdelyi founded an art school in 1927, which eventually evolved into the Uzhhorod State Arts and Crafts College (Czech: Užhorodské státní vysoké školy uměleckoprůmyslové, Hungarian: Kárpátaljai Képzőművészek Egyesülete). That institution is now the Transcarpathian Academy of Arts. Erdelyi and Boksay are among the primary figures of the Transcarpathian stylistic school.

Among his students was Fedir Manailo (Hungarian: Manajló Tivadar), a fellow Hungarian/Rusyn. He died in Uzhhorod.

== Life ==
=== Early life before World War II ===
He began his studies in Máramarossziget. Between 1911 and 1915 he graduated from the Hungarian Academy of Fine Arts in Budapest, where his masters were Károly Ferenczy, Imre Révész and Tivadar Zemplényi. In 1913, he was awarded a scholarship at the Kecskemét Artists' Camp. His teachers were Béla Iványi-Grünwald and Ferenc Olgyay. Between 1916 and 1921, the renowned painter was a drawing teacher at the secondary schools in Munkács, and between 1927 and 1931 at the teacher training school in Ungvár. In 1922–1926 he was on a 12-year tour abroad in Munich, Italy, Poland and Switzerland. In 1931–1937, he worked with modern French painters in Paris, in Gargillese art school. With József Boksay, they were founders of the school of painting in Transcarpathia. In 1927, he founded a free school of fine arts with József Boksay. In 1931, he founded the Association of Artists of Transcarpathia, whose cofounders were Boksay, Cupal, Gaigl and Ozsdian. Erdélyi became president of the association. From 1938 he lived in Uzhhorod. He organized exhibitions in Prague, Pozsony, and Kassa. In 1941–1942 he was the main organizer of the Uzhhorod Art Days.

=== Life after World War II ===
After Hungary lost the war, he concealed his Hungarian identity and registered as a Ukrainian to avoid forced labour ("málenkij robot"), deportation and potential death at the Szolyva extermination camp. At first he accepted the patronage of General Brezhnev, and the party leader in Transcarpathia Ivan Turyanytsia. The leaders of the puppet state supported his initiative to start the Uzhhorod College of Fine Arts in 1945. He was rector of the short-lived institution, director of the Uzhhorod School of Applied Arts from 1946 to 1949 and teacher from 1949 to 1955. He was one of the founders of the Transcarpathian branch of the Ukrainian Association of Fine Arts, and was its organiser and first president from 1946 to 1949. This organization became the successor of the Association of Artists of Transcarpathia. He wanted to create a "Transcarpathian Barbizon".
Additional source: Художники Закарпаття... 62. р. (Artists of Transcarpathia... 62. r.)

=== Downfall ===
At first he believed in the Soviet power that favoured art, but later he was disappointed to learn that the ideologists of the party state in Transcarpathia rejected the artistic direction he represented. On the 'black day' of Transcarpathian culture, on 21 March 1949, at a meeting of intellectuals held in the county council hall, organised on the orders of the Party against Erdélyi and his fellow cosmopolitans, according to László Balla's contemporary records Erdélyi was given the coup de grace. The keynote speaker, prepared by the county party committee, Ukrainian poet Yuriy Hojda, head of the Transcarpathian Writers' Union, accused Erdélyi in the 23 March 1949 issue of the newspaper Sovietskoye Zakarpaty:

"that with his formalistic canvases and bourgeois aestheticism he tried to smuggle rotten Western culture into the land of Transcarpathia"

calling him and the other expellees:

"landless vagrants without identity cards"

and stating:

"This rabble of aestheticizing anti-patriotic slanderers must be crushed in the fullest possible way."

Erdélyi was completely humiliated, stripped of all his posts, even his teaching post, and sent into retirement. He was able to get out of his difficult financial situation by taking on commissions with the Fine Arts Construction Company, and doing heavy industrial work. Also humiliatingly he copied and made portraits of the current party leaders. Fearful of being completely crushed, he is self-critical in the press, trying to assert his "Soviet patriotism" in various forums.

=== Inner resistance ===
He preserved his inner intellectual resistance against the times in his "famous diaries" written in Hungarian. László Balla transcribed Erdélyi's quotes from the manuscript owned by Béla Erdélyi's widow, who was still alive at the time, and some of his notebooks were preserved by engineer Antal Borsos from Ungvár). His biographer, László Balla, draws attention to this:

"... diaries also prove the master's excellent writing skills. We know that he also wrote poetry (he once read some of it to me)."

He quotes the following entries from the mentioned diary:

"- As if I had had enough of everything that is full of lies around me. I can't live in a lie – with the imperatives in me: Beauty, truth, goodness and love."

Furthermore

"- What am I looking for and what do I want here anymore? – Yet! Perhaps I will seek in the great garbage heap of the earth the seeds of peace, understanding and love of all men towards one another."

Another entry:

"When in time you will see who this painter was, he was not a painter, but one who saw and seeketh God. God in all beauty."

Sensing his impending death, he writes the final lines of his diary:

"I finished these thoughts after the birth of Christ in June 1954"

But before that, he writes in the booklet:

"Look around you and after your daily death, you will rise every morning into eternal beauty and your soul will be one with the one who created you and you will carry within you the pure humanity of the true man and you will feel that you carry within you God, the universe and the divine wonders of existence."

Source of quotations from Béla Erdélyi's diary: László Balla. Erdélyi és kortársai, Ungvár–Budapest, 1994. p. 28–29.

=== Return and death ===
Immediately before the artist's death, the local ideologists of the party showed leniency towards Béla Erdélyi, who was striving for compromise. As a result, his "realistic" paintings became once again a success in county exhibitions. He has participated in county, national and international exhibitions and art camps. According to his nephew László Erdélyi, a painter from Ungvár:

"Because of his European education and openness to the world, he was considered cosmopolitan, his art decadent and formal. Outwardly, he never showed that he took these grievances to heart. In reality, he was deeply affected by these attacks and stigmatisation, and this obviously contributed to his early death."

== Ethnic identity ==
His memorial plaque today reads "Ukrainian artist". In various publications, Béla Erdélyi is described by some as a Rusyn or Ukrainian, by others as a Hungarian or Swabian. The statement of László Erdélyi (his nephew, who is close to his family) is correct:

"His father was a Rusyn teacher in the village of Hátmeg in the Ilosva district, his mother was German. Uncle Béla – as he has often said – declared himself Hungarian. Some people may not like that, but regardless, it would be hard to deny that everyone decides his or her own nationality. After all, Petőfi was born Petrovich."

== Legacy ==
His legacy is one of the greatest treasures of Transcarpathia's intellectual heritage. After his death, it took a decade and a half for official art history to rehabilitate him. The first album dedicated to his work was published in 1972 (Pavlov, V.: Erdelyi Album (in Cyrillic), Kiev, 1972).All of them emphasize that Béla Erdélyi's great organizational skills created a flourishing artistic life, that without his highly influential art, the distinctively individual stylistic tendency that is now called the Transcarpathian school could hardly have developed. According to Katalin Sz. Kürti.

"His art was influenced by French painting, Cézanne, Matisse, the Fauves group. He worked in almost every genre. His most famous are his expressive portraits, landscapes and virtuoso still lifes. In his paintings, drama, abstract forms, light reflections and bright but harmonious colours play an important role."

== Works ==
=== Solo (selected) exhibitions ===
In Budapest at the Academy (1913),
Munich at the Glaspalast (1923),
Prague, Ung Castle (1927),
Olmütz (1928),
In Paris, at the Champs Elysee (1930),
Brussels (1931),
Uzhhorod (1954, 1955),
Lvov (1958),
Kiev (1978),
Consulate General of Russia, Debrecen (1991),
Museum of Fine Arts of Transcarpathia, Uzhhorod (1992),
Miskolc Gallery, Miskolc [with József Boksay] (1994).

=== Selected group exhibitions ===
Fifth National Hungarian Exhibition, Kassa (1931),
Group exhibition of the Transcarpathian Artists' Association, Uzhhorod (1939–1943).
From 1945 he participated in the Ukrainian and Soviet art federation exhibitions (Uzhhorod, Mukachevo, Kiev, Moscow).
Nyíregyháza (1980),
Kassa (1982, 1989).

=== Outdoor works ===
Jesus descends (altarpiece, 1936, Nagyszőlős, Hospital Chapel).

=== Works in public collections ===
Museum of Fine Arts of Boksay County, Uzhhorod;
Museum of Fine Arts of the Mukhachevo Basin, Kyiv;
Ukrainian Association of Fine Arts;
The collections of the Ministry of Science and Culture of Ukraine;
Private collections from Eastern and Western Europe.

=== Publications ===
Erdélyi Béla: Képzőművészet. In. Csíkvári Antal (szerk.): Ungvár és Ung vármegye. Budapest. 194 0. 152–154. o.

== Bibliography ==
=== Printed ===
- Balla, László [in Hungarian] (1994) [1994]. Erdélyi Béla és kortársai. Ungvár-Budapest: Galéria Kiadó. ISBN 963-8424-09-5.
