= Fedir Manailo =

Fedir Manailo (Hungarian: Manajló Tivadar; Ukrainian: Федір Манайло; 19 October 1910, Ivanivtsi – 15 January 1978, Uzhhorod) was an artist of mixed Hungarian and Rusyn ethnicity from Zakarpattia Oblast. He was influenced by the expressionist movement. The territory of today's Zakarpattia Oblast at that time part of Austria-Hungary, later part of Czechoslovakia and Hungary until 1945.

Manailo studied at the Art and Technical School in Prague with Brunner. He visited France in 1930, traveling to Paris, Marseille and Lyon, France. From 1937 to 1945 he taught decorative art at the Uzhhorod Trade School, before moving on to lecture at the Uzhhorod Art School.

After the return of Carpathian Ruthenia to Hungary, Manajló's art became the most highly acclaimed after Erdeli's in the Kingdom of Hungary.

Starting from the 1940s, Manailo painted genre scenes of the Zakarpattia.

His son, János/Iván Manajló, and grandson, András Manajló, became similarly renowned painters. The family is currently living in Hungary.
