= Nikolay Storozhenko =

Nikolay (Nikolai, Mykola) Storozhenko may refer to:

- Nikolay Ilyich Storozhenko, literary historian
- Nikolay Vladimirovich Storozhenko, historian, nationalist
- Nikolay Andreyevich Storozhenko, painter
