= Arsen Savadov =

Ukrainian artist

- Born: Arsen Savadov; 24 September 1962 (age 63); Kyiv, Ukraine
- Education: Shevchenko State Art School, Kyiv
- Known for: Artist
- Notable work: Donbass-Chocolate (1997); Collective red (1998)
- Website: www.savadov.com

Arsen Savadov is a Ukrainian conceptualist photographer and painter of Armenian descent. Participant of the Ukrainian New Wave.

== Biography ==
Arsen Savadov was born in 1962 in Kyiv, to the family of Vladimir Savadov, a book illustrator, originally from Baku, Azerbaijan. He studied painting at the Shevchenko State Art School. A graduate of the Kyiv Art Institute, Savadov lives and works in Kyiv.

== Selected personal exhibitions ==
- 2017 – Gulliver's dream, Art Ukraine Gallery, Kyiv, Ukraine
- 2012 – Escape to Egypt, Collection gallery, Kyiv, Ukraine
- 2012 – First-person, Pecherskiy Gallery (V-art gallery), Moscow
- 2007 – Paintings. Daniyal Mahmood Gallery. New York
- 2005 – Love Story. Galerie Orel Art Presenta, Paris
- 2003 – Donbass-Chocolate. Galerie Orel Art Presenta, Paris
- 2002 – Kokto. Marat Guelman Gallery, Kyiv, Ukraine
- 2001 – Book of the Dead. Art Moscow Workshop, Central House of Artist, Moscow
- 1998 – Deepinsider: Arsen Savadov (with Alexander Kharchenko), Soros Center for Contemporary Arts Gallery, Kyiv, Ukraine
- 1995 — Arsen Savadov & Georgy Senchenko. House of Artist, Kyiv, Ukraine
- 1995 — Arsen Savadov. Chasie Post Gallery, Atlanta, USA
- 1995 — Keine dressur! (with Georgy Senchenko). Marat Guelman Gallery, Moscow
- 1994 — Christmas Action (with Georgy Senchenko). Marat Guelman Gallery, Moscow
- 1992 — The works of Savadov & Senchenko. Berman Gallery, New York, USA
- 1991 — Arsen Savadov & Georgy Senchenko. Marat Guelman Gallery at Central House of Artists, Moscow

== Selected group exhibitions ==
- 2017 — Art Riot: Post-Soviet Actionism, Saatchi Gallery, London
- 2016 — Recycling Religion, WhiteBox, New York
- 2015 — BALAGAN!!! Contemporary Art from the Former Soviet Union and Other Mythical Places, Curated by David Elliott, MOMENTUM, Berlin
- 2014 — Volta 10, Basel
- 2014 — PREMONITION: UKRAINIAN ART NOW, Saatchi Gallery, London
- 2013 — Days of Ukraine in the United Kingdom, Saatchi Gallery, London
- 2012 — Apocalypse and Renaissance in Chocolate House, branch of the National Museum "Kiyv Art Gallery,"Kyiv. Curated by Oleg Kulik and Kostyantyn Doroshenko.

== Museums ==
- Musée des Civilisations de l'Europe et de la Méditerranée, France
- Maison Européenne de la Photographie, Paris, France
- Musée d'art contemporain, Bordeaux, France
- Moderna Museet, Stockholm, Sweden
- Museum of Modern Art, Ljubljana, Slovenia
- The Jane Voorhees Zimmerli Art Museum, Norton and Nancy Dodge Collection, Rutgers
- University, New Brunswick, New Jersey, USA
- The Russian Museum, Saint-Petersburg, Russia
- Multimedia Art Museum, Moscow, Russia (Moscow House of Photography, Moscow, Russia)
- PinchukArtCentre, Kyiv, Ukraine
- Modern Art Museum, Kyiv, Ukraine
- Henie Onstad Kunstsenter, Oslo, Norway

== Collections ==
- Stephane Janssen Collection, USA
- Moderna Museet, Stockholm, Sweden
- Pierre Broche Collection, Paris-Moscow
- Collection Igor Markin, Moscow, Russia
- Pinchuk Art Center Collection, Kyiv, Ukraine
- Phillips De Pury Collection
- Bernar Loze Collection (Paris, France)
- Norton Dodge Collection (New Jersey, USA)
- Sir Elton John Collection (London)
- Natalia Ivanova Collection (Moscow, Russia)
