= Arts of Ukraine =

The arts of Ukraine comprise all works of art created during the history of Ukraine's development.

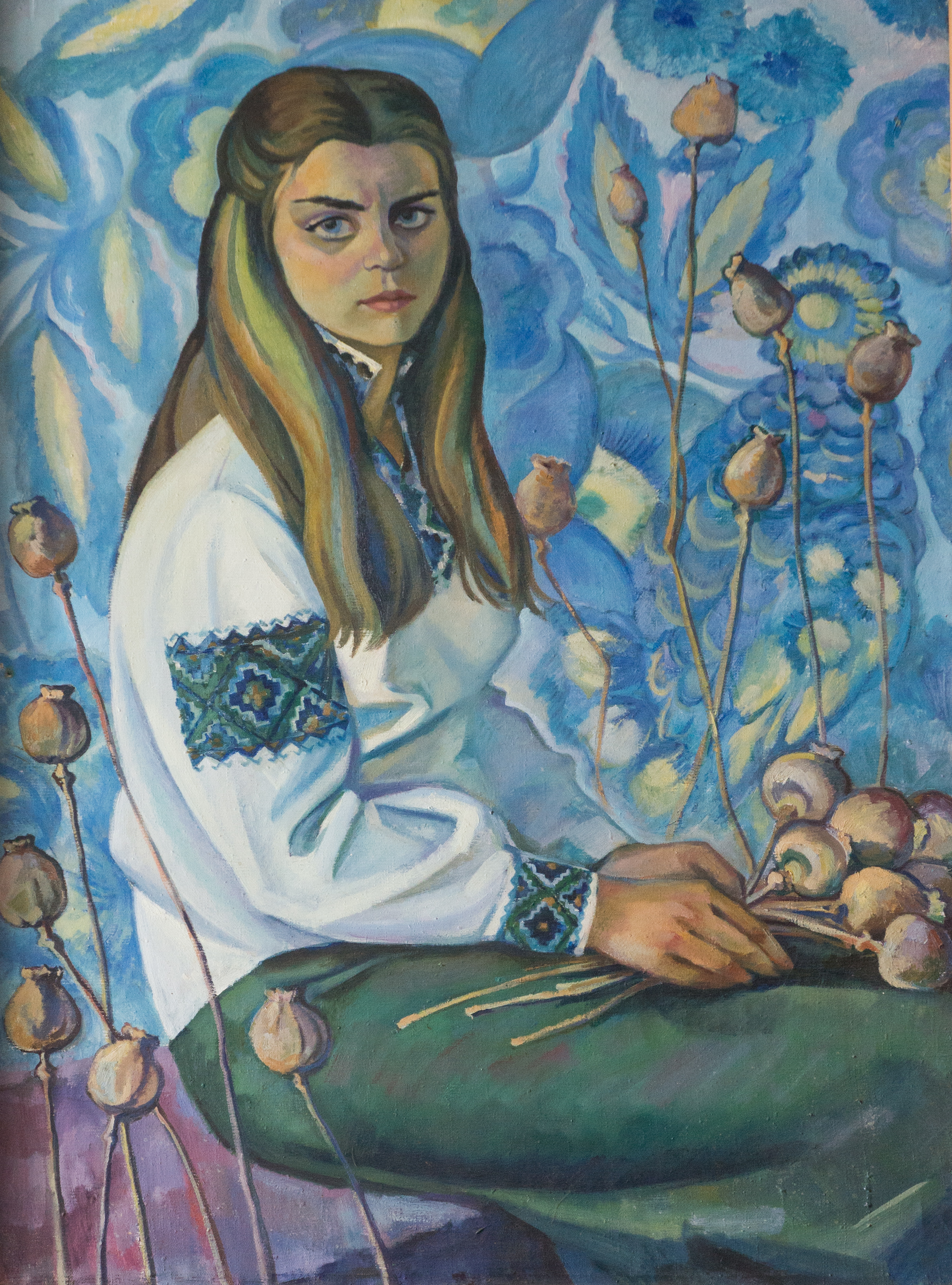
Orest Zaborskiy, Portrait of a Woman with Poppy (1978)

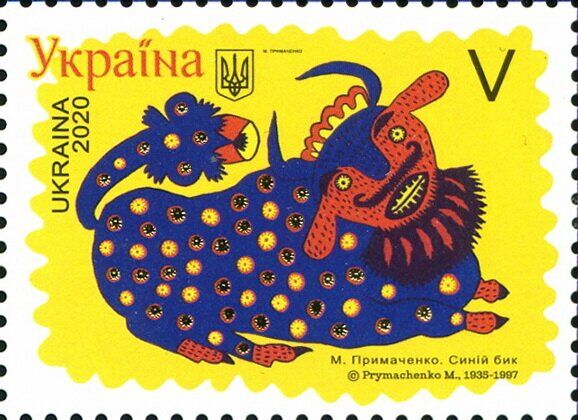
Maria Prymachenko, Blue Bull (1947), as featured on a 2020 Ukrainian postage stamp

== Ukrainian folk art ==
Folk art of Ukraine is a layer of Ukrainian culture associated with the creation of the worldview of the Ukrainian people, its psychology, ethical guidelines, and aesthetic aspirations, covering all types of folk art, traditionally inherent in Ukraine: music, dance, songs, decorative and applied arts, developing as a single complex, and organically included in the life of the people throughout its history. One of the most famous Ukrainian folk artists is Maria Prymachenko.

== Art through the ages ==
=== Ukrainian art of the Gothic era ===
One of the most interesting periods in the history of Ukrainian architecture is the end of the 14th and the first half of the 15th centuries. Many settlers came to Ukrainian cities, mostly Germans, who brought new stylistic forms to art, and in particular to architecture. Painters created frescoes and altarpieces, but the most vivid Gothic paintings were embodied in stained glass, which filled huge openings of windows, and upper floors of chapels.

=== Ukrainian art of the Renaissance ===
The period of the last quarter of the 16th to the first half of the 17th century is called the Renaissance period. In general, the architecture and fine arts of the Renaissance in Ukraine are characterized by the spread of architectural art forms of the Italian Northern Renaissance, the sensation of new acquisitions of European art, and their synthesis with the traditions of Kievan Rus and Ukrainian folk art. New artistic means, techniques were not an end in themselves, but a means to personalize architectural buildings and artistic images of humanistic ideals. The artistic culture of the Renaissance of Ukraine became the basis for the unique Ukrainian Baroque. During the Renaissance, Ukrainian culture in polemical works of art embodied national spiritual values, national ideas, and internally prepared, created, the social atmosphere in which the national liberation war led by Bohdan Khmelnytsky ended with the restoration of the Ukrainian state.

=== Ukrainian art of the Baroque era ===
Details: Ukrainian Baroque

The period of the second half of the 17th to the 18th centuries is called the epoch of old Ukrainian culture, i.e. the one that preceded the new one, created in the last two centuries. The art of that time developed in the Baroque style, which penetrated into all cultural spheres and flourished in the 18th century as the world-famous "Ukrainian Baroque."

=== Soviet era ===
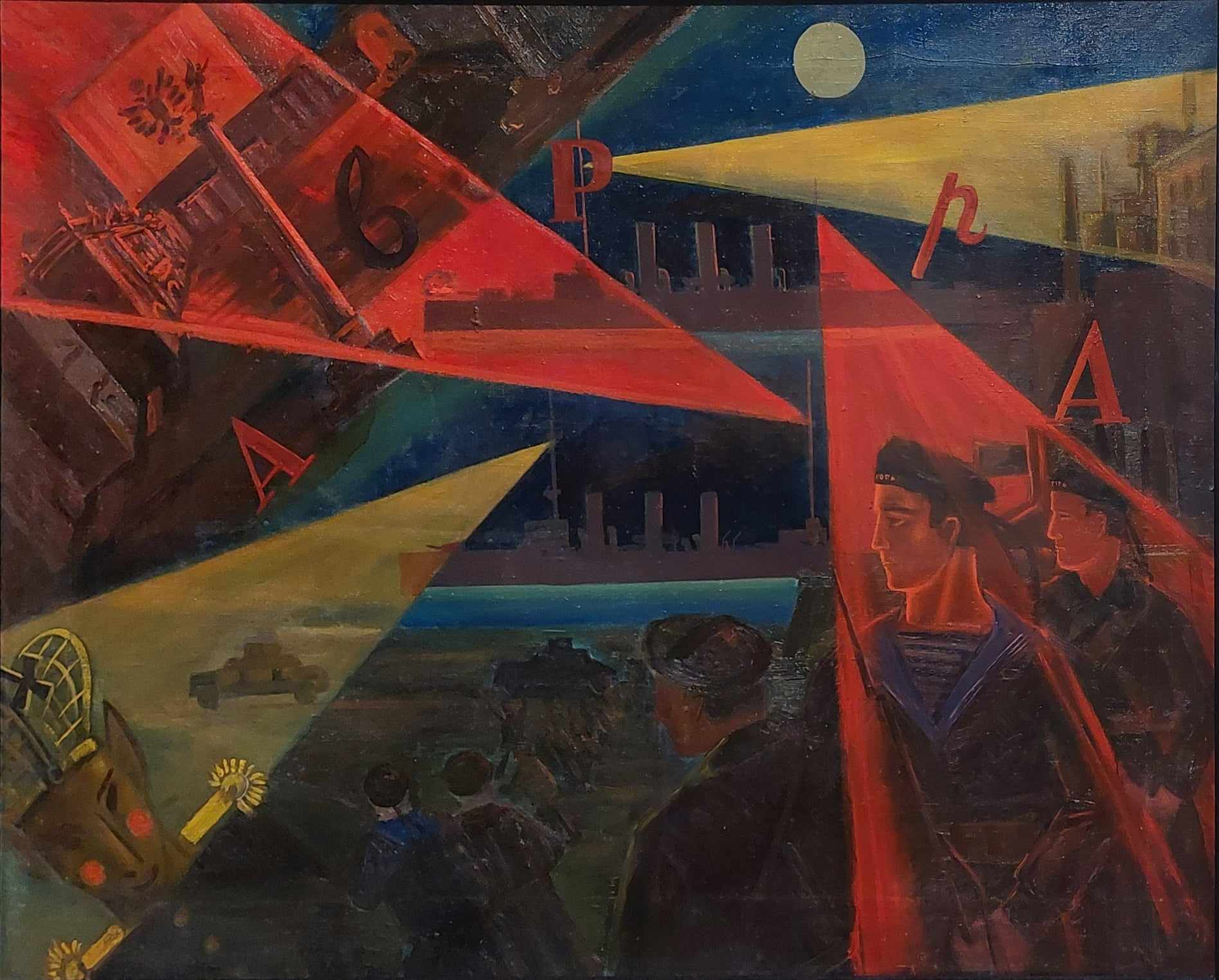
Ukrainian avant-garde painting, The Overthrow of the Autocracy; by Petro Martyniuk, c. 1930

During the Soviet era art in Ukraine, like in the rest of the Soviet Union, experienced first an era of experimentation where artists sought to break out of traditional formalism in art. Soon, however, Soviet art became strongly formal with the imposition of Socialist Realism. Experimental art was replaced by topics and forms of art that the political elite approved of.

== Contemporary Ukrainian art ==
Impressionism in Ukraine has already given impetus to the work of renowned masters of Ukrainian art such as Burachek, Vasylkivsky, Izhakevych, Dyachenko, Zamirailo, Zhuk, Krasytsky, V. Krychevsky, F. Krychevsky, Levchenko, Kulchytsky, Murashko, Manievich, Novakivsky, Pymonenko, Sosenko, Samokish, Kholodny, Trush, Shulga, Yaremich, and many others. Their activity in painting practice and in the promotion of Ukrainian art through exhibitions, articles, and pedagogical work laid the foundations for the contemporary work of Ukrainian artists.

During the activities of these artists, there was a need for art organizations to plan and organize their work and give it organizational shape. And so began the first artistic organization – the Society of Ukrainian Artists in Kyiv, and a similar one in Kharkiv, and later in Lviv.

The Association of Revolutionary Artists of Ukraine is an organization with purely Ukrainian artistic problems, which, in addition to the practice of European art, united a group of neo-Byzantines at its core, who based their work on the Byzantine art era in Ukraine.

This group included the following artists: Boychuk, Sedlyar, Padalka, Nalipinska-Boychuk, Azovsky, Sakhnovska, Mizyn, Hvozdyk, Byzyukiv, and others, graphic artists and art critics.

Ukrainian artists working in the form of Western European reality from expressionism to neoclassicism were organized into the Association of Contemporary Artists of Ukraine, which included Taran, Palmiv, Tkachenko, Sadilenko, Kramarenko, Zhdanko, and others as the main representatives.

Close to both of these organizations in an artistic sense is the Association of Independent Ukrainian Artists in Western Ukraine with the following artists: Andrienko, Butovych, Gryshchenko, Glushchenko, Hordynsky, Dolnytska, Yemets, Kovzhun, Osinchuk, Lyaturynska, Muzyka, Selsky, and others.

A large group of artists based on Ukrainian folk art in the broadest sense of the term, which is also adjacent to the Impressionists were united in the "Association of Red Artists of Ukraine" with such names as F. Krychevsky, Mikhailov, Novoselsky, Shovkunenko, Zhuk, Trokhimenko, Kozyk, Korovchinsky, Ivanov, Sirotenko, and others.

These art organizations have a broad program of activities, including an active artistic element of all areas of art and art journalism, and are complemented by smaller organizations including "Association of Young Artists of Ukraine," "October," "Ukrainian Art Association," "Peace," and groups in Prague and Paris.

== Gallery ==
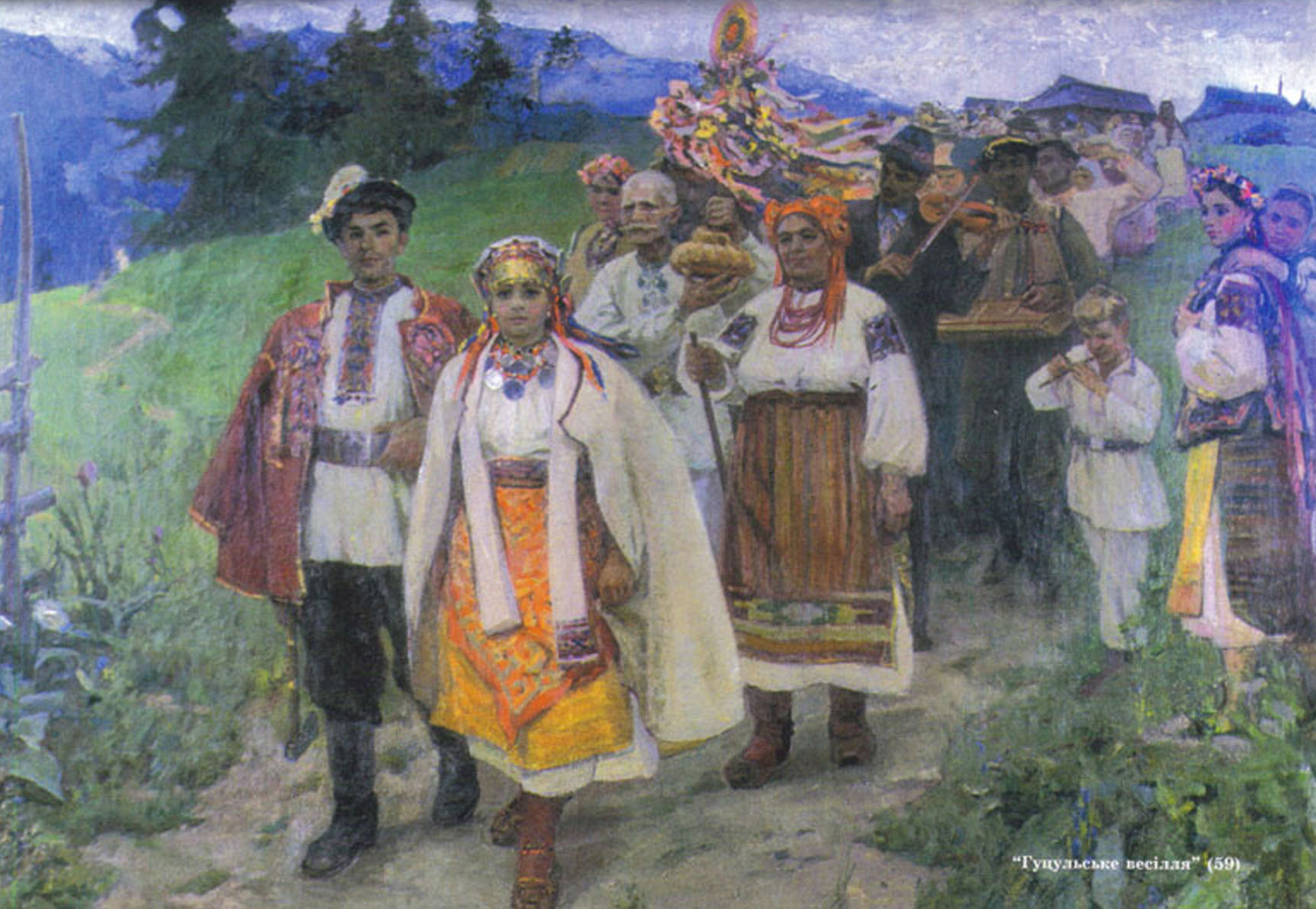
Hutsul Wedding by Zubchenko Galyna, 1959.

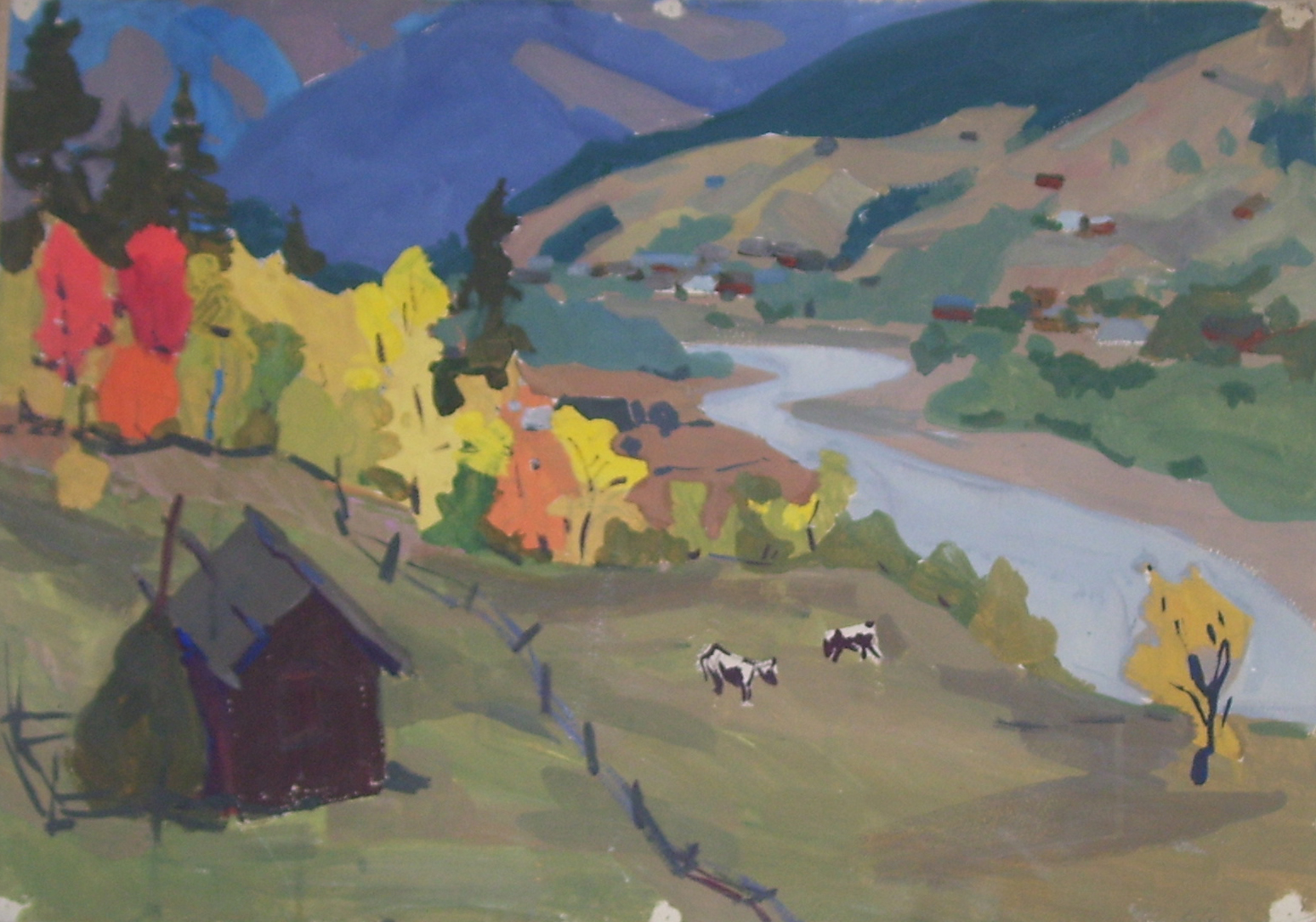
Carpathian Autumn, 2012.

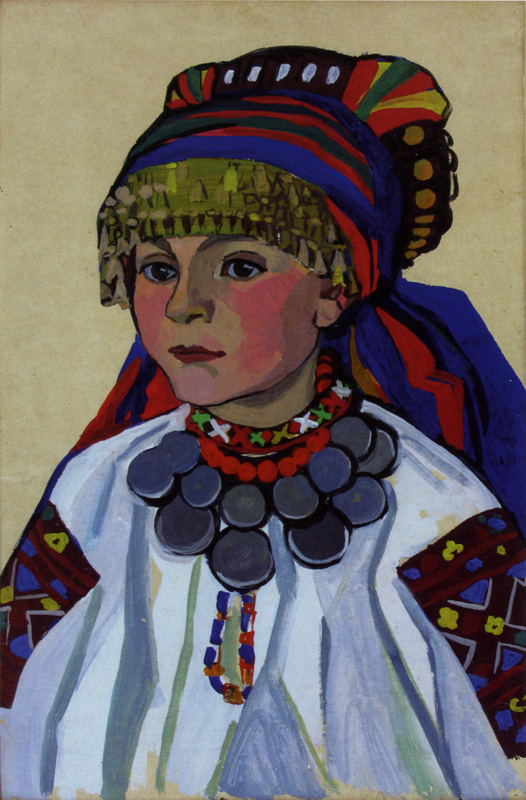
Princess Hannusya by Zubchenko Galyna, 2009.

== See also ==
- Culture of Ukraine
- Ukrainian architecture
- Music of Ukraine
- Ukrainian Baroque
- Icon painting in Ukraine
- Christian art
- Art history
- Ukrainian culture
- Ukrainian underground
- Ukrainian avant-garde
