= Pavlo Kerestey =

Ukrainian-German painter

Pavlo Kerestey is a Ukrainian born German artist and painter. He often works with the artist Susanne Clausen under the name Szuper Gallery, creating multimedia pieces and performances. He is a participant of the Ukrainian New Wave.

== Life and work ==
Kerestey was born in Uzhhorod, Ukraine, and graduated from The Lviv National Academy of Arts in 1984. After working in Moscow during the 80s and in the Parisian Commune; an infamous underground post-Soviet artist community in Kyiv in the early 90s, he represented the Ukrainian New Wave as a prolific artist. The commune was known as "a testing ground for a model of an unofficial artist run production - thinking and living space after the collapse of the Soviet-Union". In the late 1990s he left Kyiv to work in Munich and later in London. He is regarded as a significant contributor to contemporary Ukrainian art, described as one of the "Top 25 [current] Ukrainian artists" having exhibited at the exhibition 'Contemporary Ukrainian Artists' at the Saatchi Gallery in 2013 named "the most comprehensive exhibition ever devoted to Ukrainian contemporary art in the UK".

He currently lives and works in Munich, Germany and Reading, England.

=== Collections ===
His works are stored in collections around the world including:

- The National Museum of Ukraine, Kyiv, Ukraine
- The Russian State Museum, St Petersburg, Russia
- The Zenko Foundation, Kyiv, Ukraine
- The Museum of Art, Sumy, Ukraine
- The Guelman Collection, Moscow, Russia

== Exhibitions ==
=== Strange Time (2020) ===
Strange Time is the large-scale international online exhibition created by Ukrainian artist Stepan Ryabchenko within the framework of the Art Laboratory Creative Association. It was launched on May 7, 2020, during the Covid-19 quarantine. The project develops as a living organism, replenished by artists from around the world and expanding its borders. The exhibition presents the works of Pavlo Kerestey, Kenny Scharf, Samuel Jablon, Richie Culver, Vasiliy Ryabchenko, Anders Krisár, Robert Lazzarini, Omri Harmelin, Lucien Dulfan, Alex Yudzon, Aljosha, Erik Sommer, Nik Ramage, David Czupryn, Roxanne Jackson, Oleg Tistol, Felix Schramm, Stepan Ryabchenko and many others.

=== Permanent Revolution. Ukrainian Art Today (2018) ===
'Permanent Revolution. Ukrainian Art Today' was an exhibition at the Ludwig Museum, Budapest, featuring Kerestey. It was self described as "The first large-scale presentation of contemporary Ukrainian art in Hungary". Kerestey appeared as part of the art collective Szuper Gallery, showing multi-media works created by the group.

=== Kerestey Solo Exhibition (2018) ===
This exhibition at the Ilko Gallery, Uzhgorod was a personal exhibition of Kerestey's work. It featured paintings of all sizes, as well as works by Szuper Gallery, and was one of his first large scale solo exhibitions in his home town of Uzhgorod.

=== Bonobo (2015) ===
Bonobo was an exhibition at the GRAD gallery, London, that featured works by Kerestey and the group Szuper Gallery, which he is one half of. The exhibition "explores alternative societal models as a means of conflict resolution and social integration." (GRAD Gallery). The piece is named 'Bonobo' as a reference to Bonobo Apes, who are known as very uniquely peaceful and non-hierarchal; something that is explored in this exhibition

=== Contemporary Ukrainian Artists (2013) ===
This exhibition, shown at the Saatchi Gallery, London, was intended to show the most influential Ukrainian Artists who worked to develop the Ukrainian art scene in the 1990s. It brought together "The works of 25 of Ukraine's most influential artists" including Oleksandr Roitburd, Oleg Tistol, Stepan Ryabchenko and Pavlo Makov.

== Szuper Gallery ==
Kerestey often works with Susanne Clausen under the name Szuper Gallery. The group have shown works around the work in locations including the Institute of Contemporary Arts, London, and the Western Front Arts Centre, Vancouver. The group works with multimedia, combining video with live sound and performances, but they still involve paintings by Kerestey.
