= Ukrainian contemporary art =

Artistic practices in Ukraine from the late Soviet period to the present

Ukrainian contemporary art encompasses a broad range of artistic practices that have developed in Ukraine from the late Soviet period to the present. It includes painting and sculpture as well as installation, performance, video, photography and a variety of socially engaged and research-based approaches. These practices emerged and changed in response to the collapse of the Soviet Union, the formation of an independent Ukrainian state and, more recently, the effects of revolution and war.

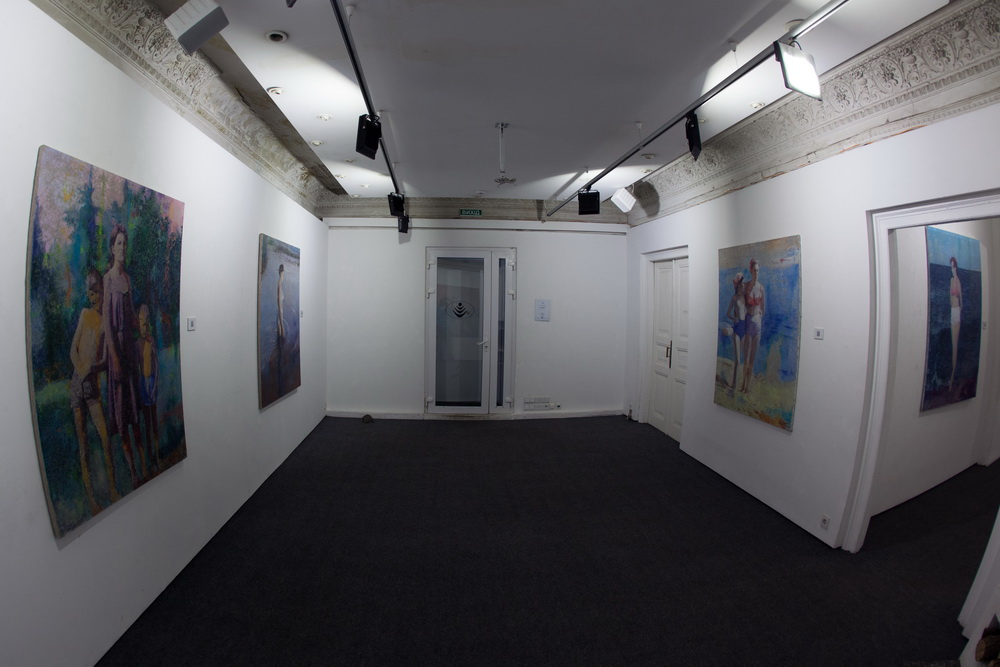
Exhibition view of works by Victor Sydorenko at Karas Gallery, Kyiv, 2018.

== Definition and periodisation ==
In Ukrainian and international discourse, the term contemporary art generally refers to artistic practices that became established in the second half of the 20th century and are still being developed. Rather than being defined only by chronology, it is associated with a shift towards conceptual and project-based work, an expanded range of media and a tendency to engage critically with social and political realities.

Within this broader frame, Ukrainian contemporary art is often described in several overlapping phases. Writers and curators usually distinguish between late Soviet unofficial and conceptual art of the 1970s–1980s, the emergence of a new artistic scene after independence in the 1990s, the institutional and market consolidation of the 2000s, and the period after 2014, which has been profoundly shaped by the Revolution of Dignity, the annexation of Crimea and the ongoing war with Russia. The full-scale invasion launched in 2022 is frequently cited as a further turning point, prompting renewed attention to questions of testimony, trauma and cultural survival.

== Historical background ==
=== Late Soviet and perestroika period ===
In the final decades of the Soviet Union, a number of informal artistic circles formed in cities such as Kyiv, Lviv, Kharkiv and Odesa. These groups experimented with alternative forms and ideas that were not compatible with official Socialist Realism. In Odesa in particular, artists developed a form of conceptual art that combined drawing, text and objects, often using irony and everyday motifs to reflect on life under a tightly controlled system. Because public opportunities to show such work were limited, artists relied on apartment exhibitions, unofficial gatherings and close personal networks. These settings did more than simply provide exhibition space: they helped shape a sense of community and a shared vocabulary that many participants later carried into the post-Soviet period. In retrospect, these initiatives are often seen as a bridge between the Soviet underground and later forms of contemporary art in Ukraine.

=== Independence and the 1990s ===
Ukraine’s declaration of independence in 1991 fundamentally changed the institutional and political environment in which artists worked. There was no longer a single state ideology that claimed to direct artistic production, but the existing system of unions and museums was slow to adapt, and new structures for contemporary art had to be created almost from scratch. The decade that followed was marked by economic instability, a sense of cultural reorientation and increased contact with international art worlds.

During the 1990s, artists in Ukraine explored a wide range of approaches, including postmodern painting, object-based installations, performance and media art. Soros Centers for Contemporary Art in Kyiv and Odesa played an important role in this process by supporting exhibitions, travel grants, publications and education programmes that brought international debates about conceptual and installation art into local discussions. At the same time, artist-run spaces and temporary initiatives tried to compensate for the lack of stable institutions and to create their own contexts for showing new work.

== Artistic tendencies and themes ==
=== Conceptualism and post-conceptual practices ===
Conceptual and post-conceptual tendencies, which treat the idea of the work as at least as important as its material form, are a recurring element in Ukrainian contemporary art. In the late Soviet and early post-Soviet years these strategies provided a way to question official narratives and to analyse how language, images and institutions shape social reality. Later generations of artists have continued to use conceptual methods, but often in connection with research into urban space, military conflict, bureaucracy or ecological issues. Projects may take the form of long-term investigations, archives of found material or participatory events rather than discrete objects intended for a traditional gallery setting.

=== Transavantgarde, painting and sculpture ===
Despite the prominence of new media, painting has remained an important medium in Ukraine. Writers have sometimes used the label Transavantgarde to describe artists who combine expressive figuration, historical and mythological references and quotations from earlier styles in a consciously eclectic manner. Arsen Savadov is frequently associated with this tendency: his works from the late 1980s and 1990s juxtapose theatrical staging, Soviet iconography and allegorical scenes, and have been widely reproduced in discussions of post-Soviet art.

Sculpture in the 1990s and 2000s followed several paths at once. Traditional public monuments continued to be commissioned for civic spaces, while younger sculptors and installation artists experimented with new materials, temporary structures and interventions into the urban environment. These developments reflected broader debates about how the physical landscape of Ukrainian cities should be reshaped in the post-Soviet period.

=== New media, performance and socially engaged art ===
From the early 1990s onwards, a growing number of Ukrainian artists began to work with video, photography, performance and installation. These media allowed them to address issues such as the rapid transformation of everyday life, the rise of consumer culture and the changing role of mass media. Performance and body art, sometimes presented in the framework of festivals and independent events, were used to explore questions of vulnerability, gender, violence and the limits of the body in conditions of political uncertainty.

By the 2000s, many artists were actively engaging with social and political topics in a more explicit way. Collaborative projects, workshops and community-based works were used to discuss the legacy of Soviet-era planning, housing, labour relations or environmental degradation. Collectives such as R.E.P. (Revolutionary Experimental Space) and HudRada (Artistic Council) became known for combining visual art with activism, public discussions and critical writing.

=== National identity, memory and war ===
Questions of national identity and historical memory run through much of the contemporary art produced in Ukraine, particularly from the early 2000s onwards. Artists have revisited episodes such as the Holodomor, the Second World War and Soviet political repressions, as well as more recent events including the Orange Revolution and the Revolution of Dignity. These subjects are often approached through archival research, interviews, re-enactments and personal narratives rather than purely commemorative imagery.

The ongoing conflict with Russia has had a direct impact on artistic production. Following the annexation of Crimea and the outbreak of war in the Donbas in 2014, many projects turned to themes of displacement, volunteer initiatives, militarisation and civil resistance. After February 2022, documentation of destruction, loss and survival became even more pronounced, and artists have been invited to contribute to international exhibitions and discussions that frame Ukrainian art in terms of resistance and decolonisation.

== Institutions and infrastructure ==
=== Early contemporary art centres ===
The institutional landscape for contemporary art in Ukraine began to change noticeably in the 1990s. The Soros Centers for Contemporary Art, established in Kyiv and Odesa as part of a wider regional network, organised exhibitions, awards and educational programms that helped introduce new curatorial models and forms of artistic practice. These centres also supported critical writing and documentation, which was an important step in building a more systematic account of recent Ukrainian art.

Around the same time, initiatives such as the EIDOS Arts Development Foundation and EIDOS Contemporary Art Centre appeared in Kyiv. They focused on socially oriented and experimental projects and tried to connect local discussions with broader debates about contemporary art. Although funding was often precarious, these early institutions created a framework in which artists, curators and critics could collaborate over a longer period.

=== PinchukArtCentre and private institutions ===
One of the most visible institutions devoted to contemporary art in Ukraine is the PinchukArtCentre in central Kyiv, which opened in 2006. Established by businessman and collector Viktor Pinchuk, it occupies several floors of a former department store near Independence Square and offers free admission. The centre hosts large-scale exhibitions that mix Ukrainian and international artists, and it organises the Future Generation Art Prize, an international award for young artists.

Alongside PinchukArtCentre, a number of private galleries and foundations have shaped the scene, particularly in Kyiv and Lviv. Karas Gallery in Kyiv, for instance, has regularly presented exhibitions by Ukrainian painters and installation artists, while Dzyga in Lviv has combined gallery work with music and cultural festivals. These spaces coexist with more informal artist-run initiatives, which continue to provide room for experimental projects that may not fit easily into commercial or museum programmes.

=== Mystetskyi Arsenal ===
The Mystetskyi Arsenal (Ukrainian: Мистецький арсенал, lit. 'Artistic arsenal') is Ukraine's flagship public cultural institution, a museum and art exhibition complex located at 10–12 Lavrska Street in central Kyiv, adjacent to the Kyiv-Pechersk Lavra. The complex occupies a classified historic building originally constructed in 1798 as a military arsenal and ammunition workshop; its walls exceed 183 cm in thickness. With a total exhibition area of approximately 60,000 m², it is one of the largest art and cultural venues in Europe. The institution was formally established by government order in March 2005 on the initiative of President Viktor Yushchenko, and opened to the public with its first major exhibition in 2009. The building was granted national monument status in 2010. Its stated mission is to contribute to the modernisation of Ukrainian society by raising awareness of social issues, fostering links with the international cultural community and presenting Ukrainian and international art to broad audiences. Alongside its exhibition programme — which has included large-scale thematic exhibitions, retrospectives and international collaborations — the Arsenal hosts the annual Book Arsenal international book and ideas festival, first held in 2011, which attracts around 50,000 visitors and includes a substantial programme devoted to Ukrainian contemporary art publishing. The institution also runs a Laboratory of Contemporary Art (the Mala Gallery), dedicated to supporting early-career Ukrainian artists and fostering professional community around experimental practice. Following the full-scale Russian invasion in February 2022, the complex was closed and its collections secured; director Olesia Ostrovska-Liuta confirmed that emergency security protocols were activated immediately.

=== International presence and diaspora ===
Ukrainian contemporary art is also present in the diaspora. The Ukrainian Institute of Modern Art (UIMA) in Chicago, founded in 1971, maintains a permanent collection and exhibition programme focused on modern and contemporary Ukrainian and Ukrainian-American artists. UIMA has hosted solo and group shows, lectures and community events that link contemporary production with earlier waves of migration.

On the diplomatic side, the Ukrainian Institute, created by the Ministry of Foreign Affairs, promotes Ukrainian visual arts abroad. Its Visualise programme supports the participation of Ukrainian artists and curators in international exhibitions, biennials and museum collaborations, often in partnership with local institutions. Since 2014, and especially after 2022, such initiatives have gained new urgency as part of cultural diplomacy and efforts to counteract Russian narratives about the region.

== Key centres and regions ==
Kyiv is generally seen as the main hub for contemporary art in Ukraine. It hosts national institutions, major galleries, art fairs and higher-education programmes that include contemporary art in their curricula. Nevertheless, other cities maintain distinct profiles. Kharkiv has a strong tradition of photography and conceptual practice that dates back to the late Soviet period, while Odesa is closely associated with conceptualism and experimental groups active from the 1970s onwards. Lviv, with its historical links to Central Europe, has supported a number of independent spaces and festivals, and industrial centres such as Dnipro have become sites for projects dealing with post-industrial landscapes and labour.

These regional scenes are connected through networks of residencies, conferences and joint exhibitions, but they also respond to local conditions and histories. The impact of war, occupation and internal displacement has altered this map, forcing some institutions to suspend work or relocate, while also generating new collaborations and support structures within and beyond Ukraine.

== Notable artists and collectives ==
=== Artists ===
- Alexander Aksinin (1949–1985) – printmaker and painter based in Lviv, associated with the Soviet Ukrainian unofficial scene of the 1970s and early 1980s. Working largely outside official channels, he developed a distinctive graphic language drawing on medieval and early modern European imagery, most notably in his Boschiana series of etchings inspired by Hieronymus Bosch. He died in the 1985 Aeroflot Flight 8381 crash at the age of 35.
- Ivan Marchuk (born 1936) – painter from Ternopil Oblast who developed a personal technique he called Pliontanism, characterised by intricate layering of fine linear strokes that give his canvases a woven, almost textile quality. His landscapes, often depicting Ukrainian rural and natural scenes at dawn or dusk, are among the most recognisable images of post-Soviet Ukrainian painting, and he has been exhibited internationally in Europe, North America and Asia.
- Victor Sydorenko (born 1953) – painter and installation artist whose projects examine the body, memory and trauma, often through restrained colour schemes and references to uniforms and disciplinary structures. He has represented Ukraine at international biennials and curated large group shows.
- Oleg Tistol (born 1960) – painter associated with the Ukrainian transavantgarde and the wider post-Soviet conceptual scene. Together with Mykola Matsenko he formed the duo Natsprom (National Products), producing large-format paintings that rework Soviet-era imagery, Ukrainian national symbols and mass-media iconography. His work has been shown at the PinchukArtCentre and in international exhibitions.
- Arsen Savadov (born 1962) – painter and photographer associated with the Ukrainian transavantgarde and postmodern imagery; his projects often stage complex tableaux that combine Soviet references with theatrical and mythological motifs.
- Ihor Podolchak (born 1962) – Lviv-based conceptual painter, printmaker and film director. His painting practice includes abstract and semi-figurative canvases alongside graphic series such as Op and photographic works. He co-founded the Masoch Fund, an interdisciplinary art initiative that organised performances and public art projects in Lviv from the 1990s onward.
- Igor Gubskiy (1954–2022) – figurative painter from Luhansk Oblast whose work combines expressionist and realist tendencies, often depicting solitary figures, intimate interiors and working-class subjects with a raw, unsentimental directness.
- Evgenia Gapchinskaya (born 1974) – painter based in Kharkiv, known for her illustrative style featuring rounded, childlike figures set against bright backgrounds, which she describes as happy art. Her works have been reproduced on Ukrainian postage stamps and are widely collected in Ukraine and internationally.
- Borys Fedorenko – painter working primarily in landscape, still life and genre painting. His canvases, rendered in a realist manner with an expressive handling of light and colour, depict Ukrainian rural churches, river scenes and seasonal landscapes.
- Olesya Hudyma – painter whose works merge elements of abstract art, expressionism and magic realism. After leaving Ternopil due to the full-scale invasion in 2022, she continued her practice in Italy and has been profiled by Ukrainian cultural media for her emotionally charged imagery.
- Davyd Chychkan (1986–2025) – Kyiv-based painter, draughtsman and activist who combined artistic practice with civil and military engagement. His drawings, often executed in a rapid energetic line, addressed themes of occupation, resistance and Ukrainian identity. He was killed in action in Zaporizhzhia Oblast in August 2025 while serving in the Ukrainian armed forces.

==== Sculptors ====
- Ravil Akmaev (born 1948) – sculptor and painter from Kadiivka, a member of the Donetsk Regional Organisation of the National Union of Artists of Ukraine. His works encompass portrait painting, genre scenes and monumental sculpture, several pieces of which are installed in public spaces in Donetsk Oblast.
- Zhanna Kadyrova (born 1981) – multidisciplinary artist working with sculpture, mosaic and installation. Her works frequently address how ideology and economic change are inscribed into architecture and public space, and she has participated in major international exhibitions and biennials.
- Nazar Bilyk (born 1980) – sculptor from Lviv whose work in polymer, bronze and glass explores perception, memory and the instability of form. His series Counterforms and Imaginary Distances use transparent and translucent materials to question physical boundaries, and his sculptures have been exhibited in major galleries in Kyiv, Lviv and Kharkiv as well as internationally. He is widely considered one of the most significant Ukrainian sculptors of his generation.
- Aljoscha (born 1974) – artist and sculptor born in Hlukhiv, Ukraine, based in Düsseldorf, Germany. His large-scale installations and sculptures explore the intersection of synthetic biology and aesthetics, developing what he calls bioism — a practice that treats artworks as living or quasi-organic forms. His installation The Gates of the Sun and the Land of Dreams, created for Schloss Benrath in Germany, and Panspermia are among his most widely exhibited works. Aljoscha's sculptures and installations have been shown across Europe and North America.
- Olga Balema (born 1984) – sculptor and installation artist born in Kyiv, based in New York. Her works combine abstract and representational elements, often using industrial and organic materials to create objects that hover between recognisable form and pure abstraction. She has exhibited widely in the United States and Europe and is represented by international galleries.
- Petro Antip (born 1959) – sculptor and painter from Horlivka, a member of the National Union of Artists of Ukraine. His practice spans figurative and abstract sculpture in stone and metal, and he has participated in numerous all-Ukrainian and international exhibitions and outdoor sculpture symposia. Several of his works are installed in public spaces in Ukraine.
- Oleksandr Sukholit – painter, sculptor and installation artist described as a prolific experimenter, with a body of work that includes more than 500 sculptures alongside graphic and performance works. His practice crosses the boundaries between object-making, painting and conceptual art.

==== Photographers ====
- Evgeny Pavlov (born 1949) – one of the founding members of the Kharkiv School of Photography, known for lyrical black-and-white work that combines documentary sensitivity with a painterly attention to light and form. His photographs, made across several decades, are among the foundational works of Ukrainian art photography.
- Sergey Bratkov (born 1960) – Kharkiv-born photographer and installation artist who documented the social ruptures of post-Soviet Ukraine with a forensic, often darkly comic eye. Alongside Boris Mikhailov, he is among the most internationally exhibited figures of the Kharkiv school, and his work incorporates video and installation alongside photography.
- Alexander Chekmenev (born 1969) – photographer from Luhansk whose long-term projects document marginalised communities in eastern Ukraine, including Roma communities, the elderly and people living in poverty. His work, produced since the 1990s, has been widely published and exhibited internationally, and he is considered one of the leading documentary photographers of his generation.
- Evgeny Maloletka (born 1985) – photojournalist and documentary photographer from Berdyansk who gained international recognition for his coverage of the siege of Mariupol in 2022. Together with Mstyslav Chernov, his photographs of the Mariupol maternity hospital bombing were among the most widely published war images of the decade, and the pair were awarded the Pulitzer Prize for Breaking News Photography in 2023.
- Mstyslav Chernov (born 1985) – journalist, filmmaker and photographer based in Kharkiv. His documentary 20 Days in Mariupol (2023), co-produced with the Associated Press and based on footage shot during the siege, received the Academy Award for Best Documentary Feature in 2024, the first Oscar won by a Ukrainian production.
- Vladyslav Krasnoshchok – Kharkiv-based photographer and member of the younger generation of the Kharkiv School, known for intimate street photography and experimental darkroom work. His practice was discussed in a 2025 MoMA feature alongside fellow Ukrainian photographers Elena Subach and Lisa Bukreyeva in the context of wartime artistic production.
- Elena Subach – documentary photographer whose long-term projects examine Ukrainian Jewish heritage, religious community and memory. Her work has been featured in international publications and exhibitions, and was included in MoMA's 2025 feature on Ukrainian photographers responding to wartime.
- Boris Mikhailov (born 1938) – photographer based between Kharkiv and Berlin, widely regarded as one of the most significant contemporary artists to have emerged from the Soviet Union. Co-founder of the underground Vremena (Time) group in the early 1970s and a central figure in the Kharkiv School of Photography, he developed a rigorously personal practice combining documentary observation, irony and formal experiment. His long-term series, among them Case History (1997–1998), document poverty, the body and social disintegration in post-Soviet Ukraine with an unflinching directness. His work is held in the collections of MoMA, the Metropolitan Museum of Art, Tate Modern and the Museum of Photography in Winterthur, and he received the Hasselblad Foundation Award in 2000. In 2021 he was awarded the Shevchenko National Prize, the first official Ukrainian state recognition of his practice.

=== Collectives and initiatives ===
- R.E.P. (Revolutionary Experimental Space) – Kyiv-based collective established in 2004 in the context of the Orange Revolution; its members have realised performances, installations and graphic campaigns that examine citizenship, propaganda and state symbols.
- HudRada (Artistic Council) – interdisciplinary group that combines curatorial work, artistic production and critical theory, organising exhibitions and public events on issues such as urban development, labour and cultural policy.
- SOSka group – collective originating in Kharkiv, active in exhibitions and public interventions that reflect on local urban realities and the legacy of Soviet modernism.

== Reception ==
From the 2000s onwards, Ukrainian contemporary art has attracted increasing attention from scholars and curators outside Ukraine. Articles and catalogues have appeared in journals and platforms such as ARTMargins Online and the Museum of Modern Art’s research initiative post, often situating Ukrainian practices within broader debates on post-socialist art and decolonisation.

Curators and writers including Tatiana Bessarabova, Katia Denysova and Tatiana Biedarieva have contributed essays, interviews and exhibition projects that foreground Ukrainian perspectives on war, identity and cultural policy. Within Ukraine, institutions such as the Ukrainian Institute and platforms like The Ukrainians have published analytical texts and interviews that help systematise knowledge about recent art and its social context.

== Images ==
Selected works by Ukrainian contemporary artists

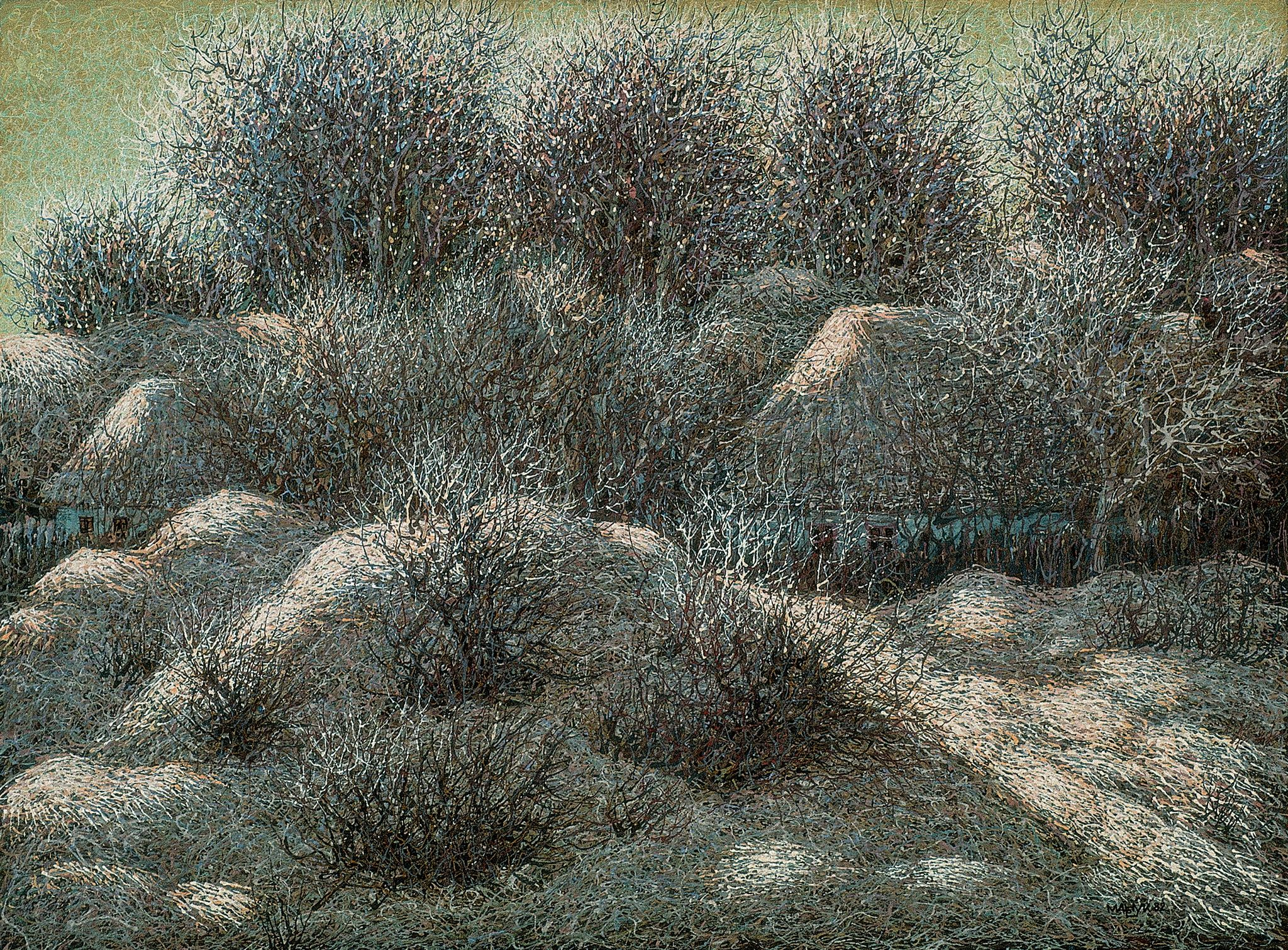
Ivan Marchuk, Bilia khaty sontse khodyt' (The sun walks near the house), 1982. Oil on canvas.

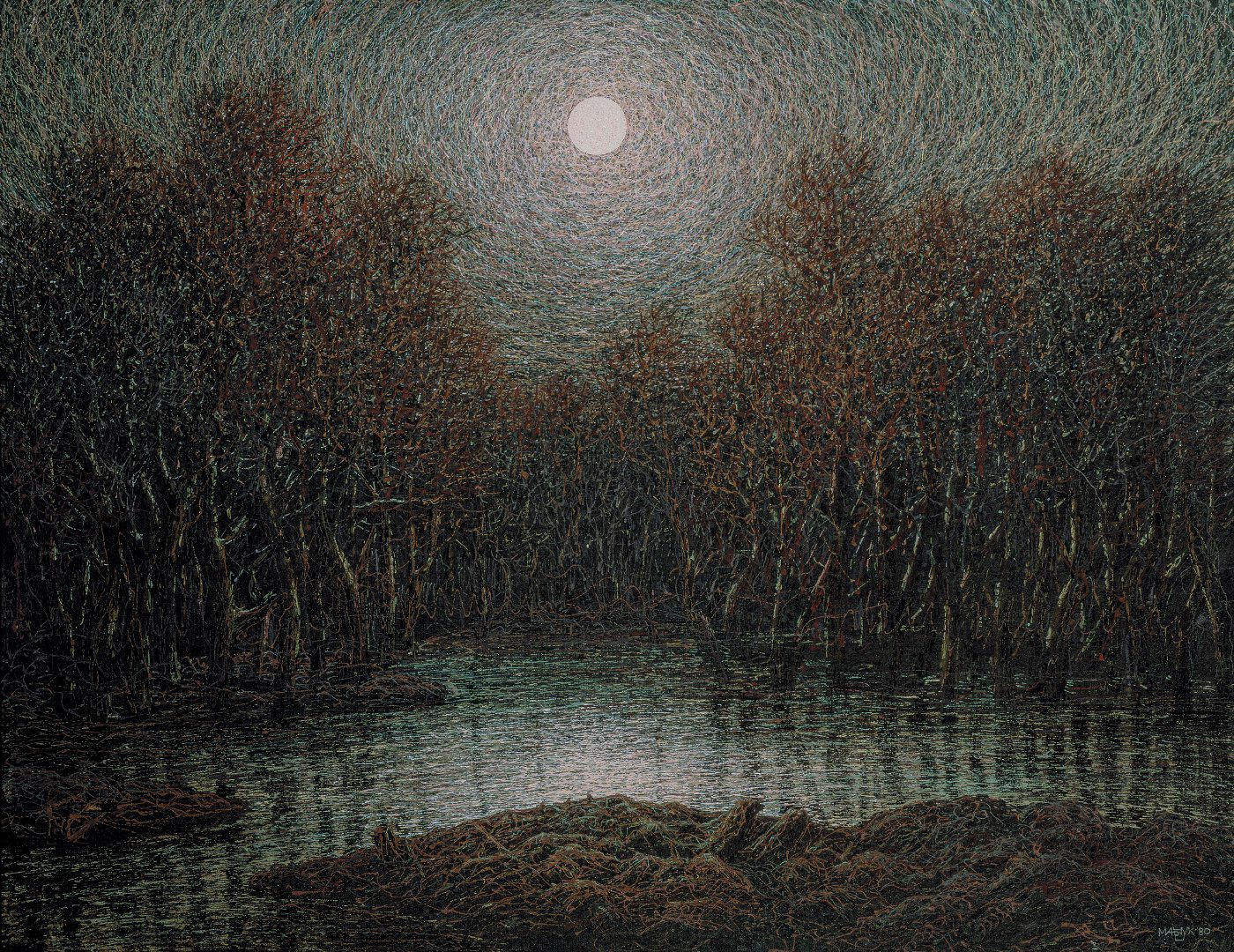
Ivan Marchuk, Vesniani vody (Spring waters), 1982. Oil on canvas.

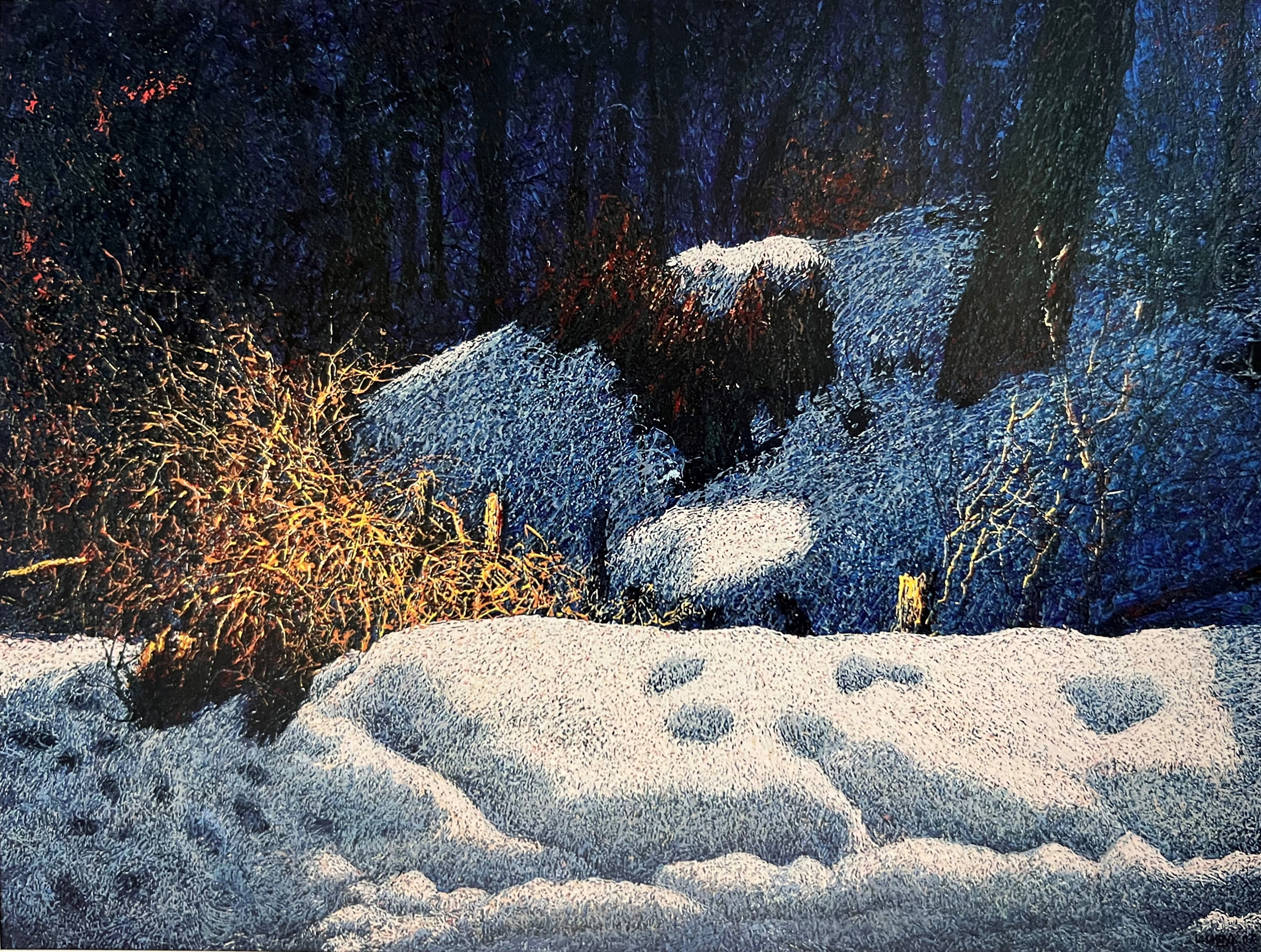
Ivan Marchuk, Zyma u Kanevi (Winter in Kaniv), 2007. Oil on canvas.

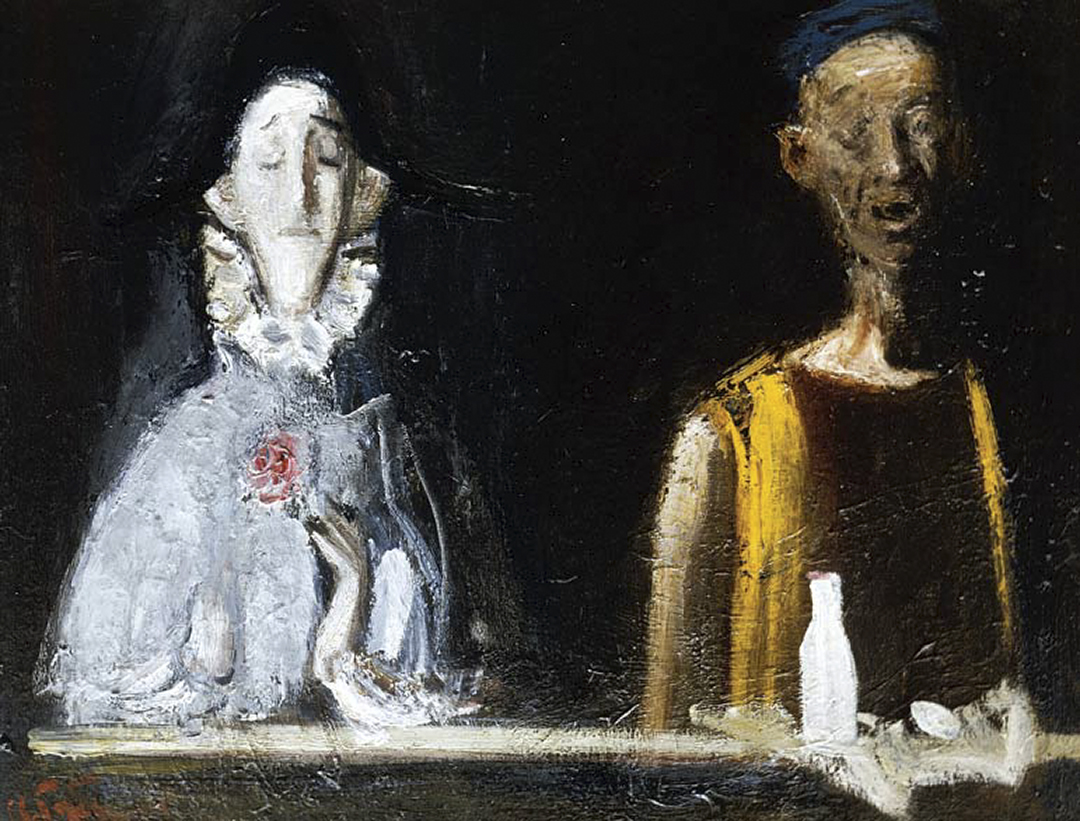
Igor Gubskiy, Art and life, 1985. Oil on canvas.

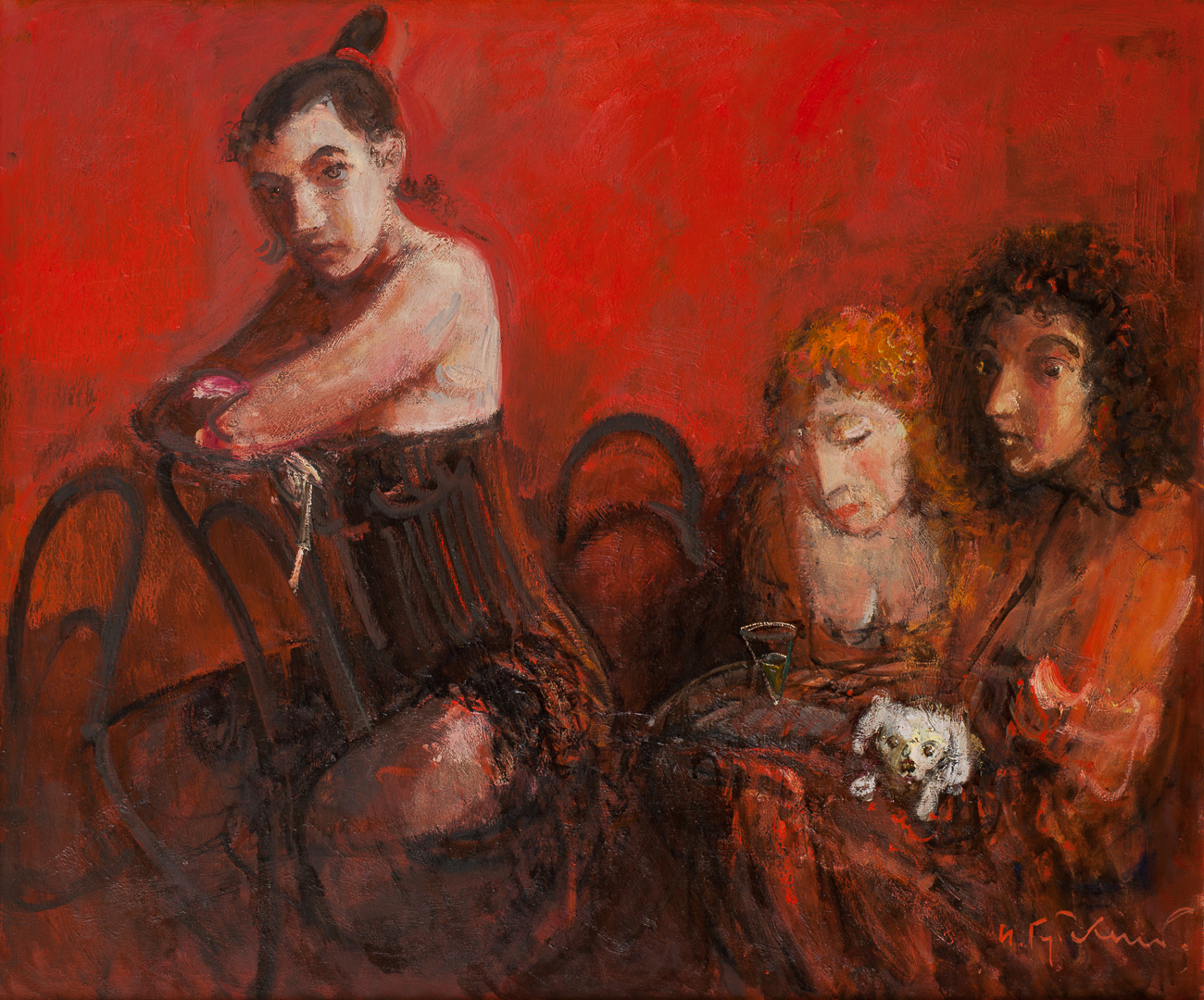
Igor Gubskiy, Night Cafe, 2013. Oil on canvas.

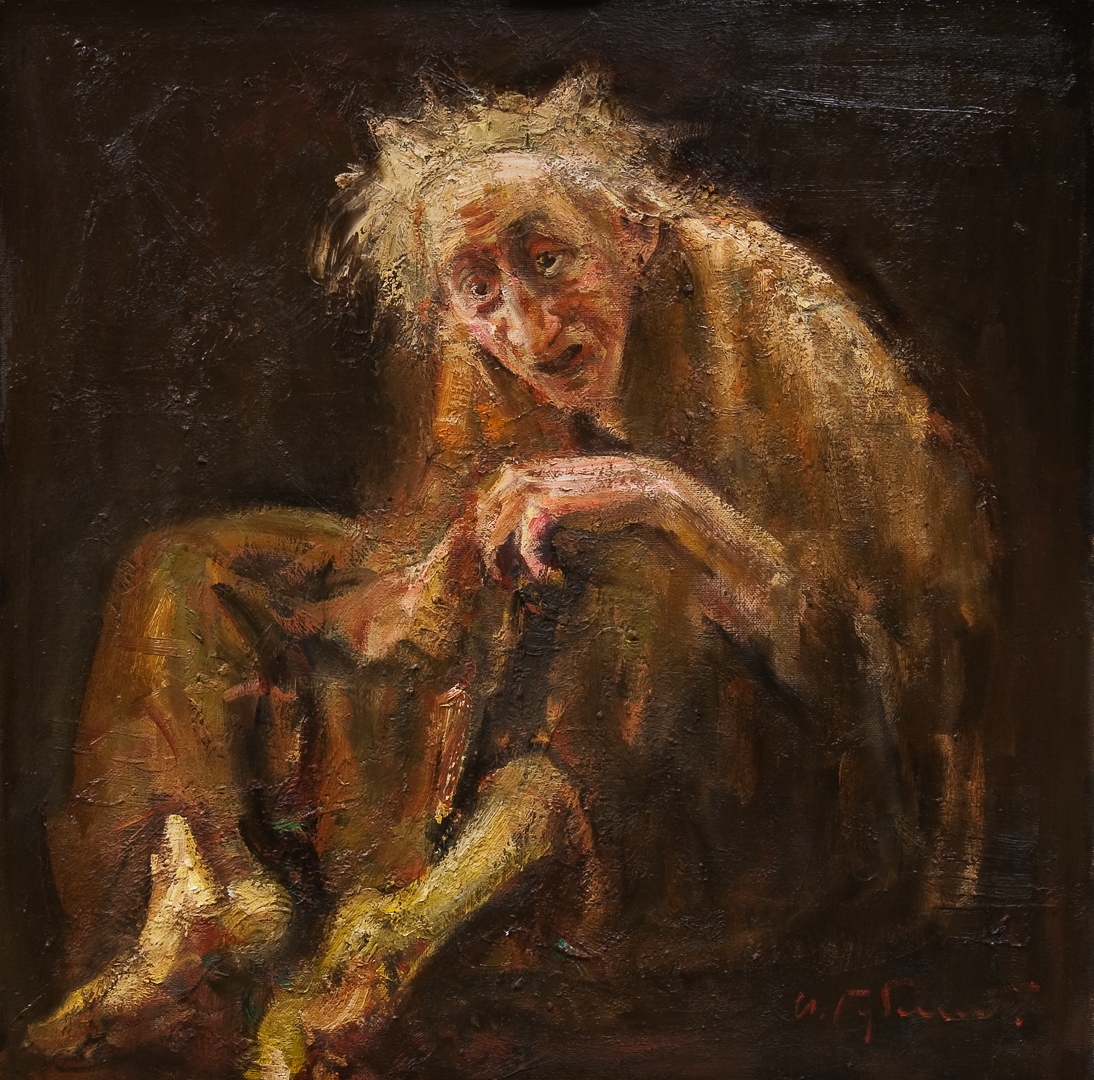
Igor Gubskiy, Old woman, 2009. Oil on canvas.

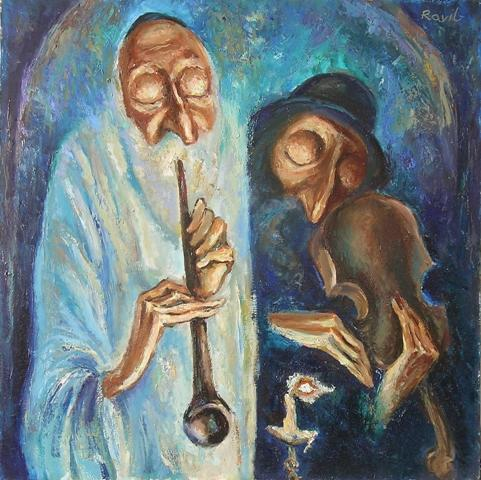
Ravil Akmaev, Melodiia (Melody). Oil on canvas.

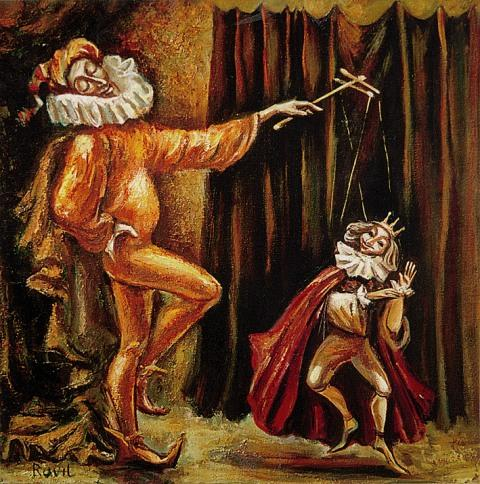
Ravil Akmaev, Vernye Druz'ia (True Friends). Oil on canvas.

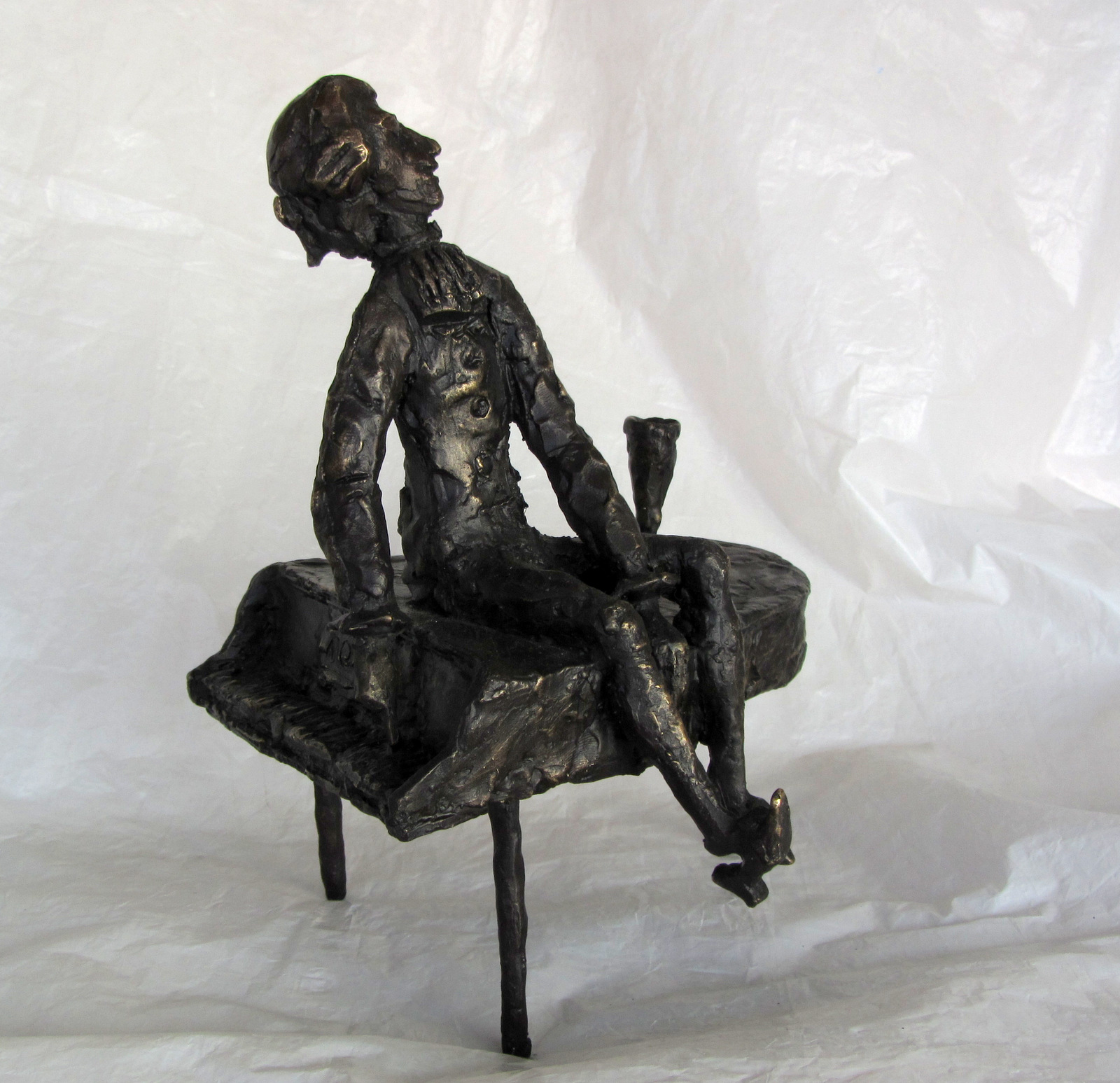
Ravil Akmaev, Mozart. Oil on canvas.

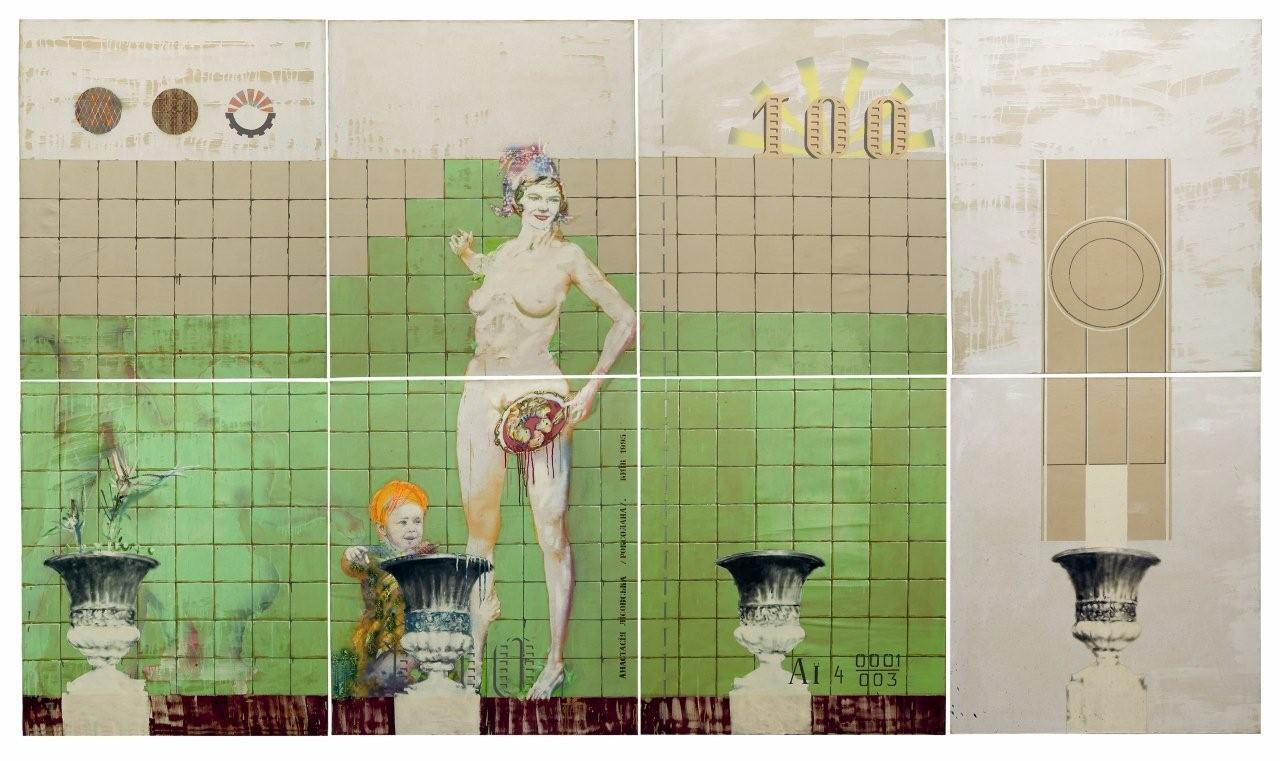
Oleg Tistol, Roxelana. Oil on canvas.

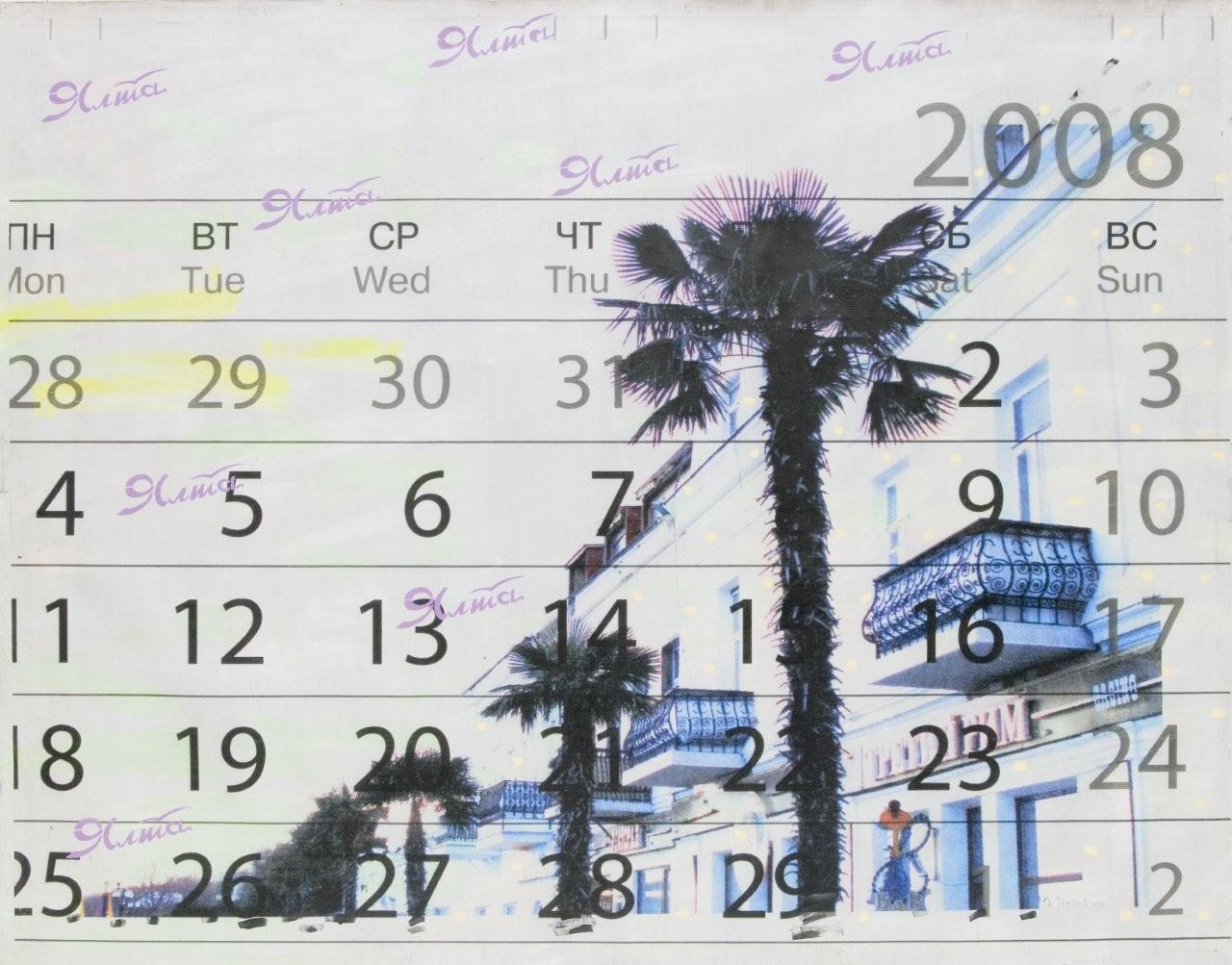
Oleg Tistol, The Third Rome, 2008. Oil on canvas.

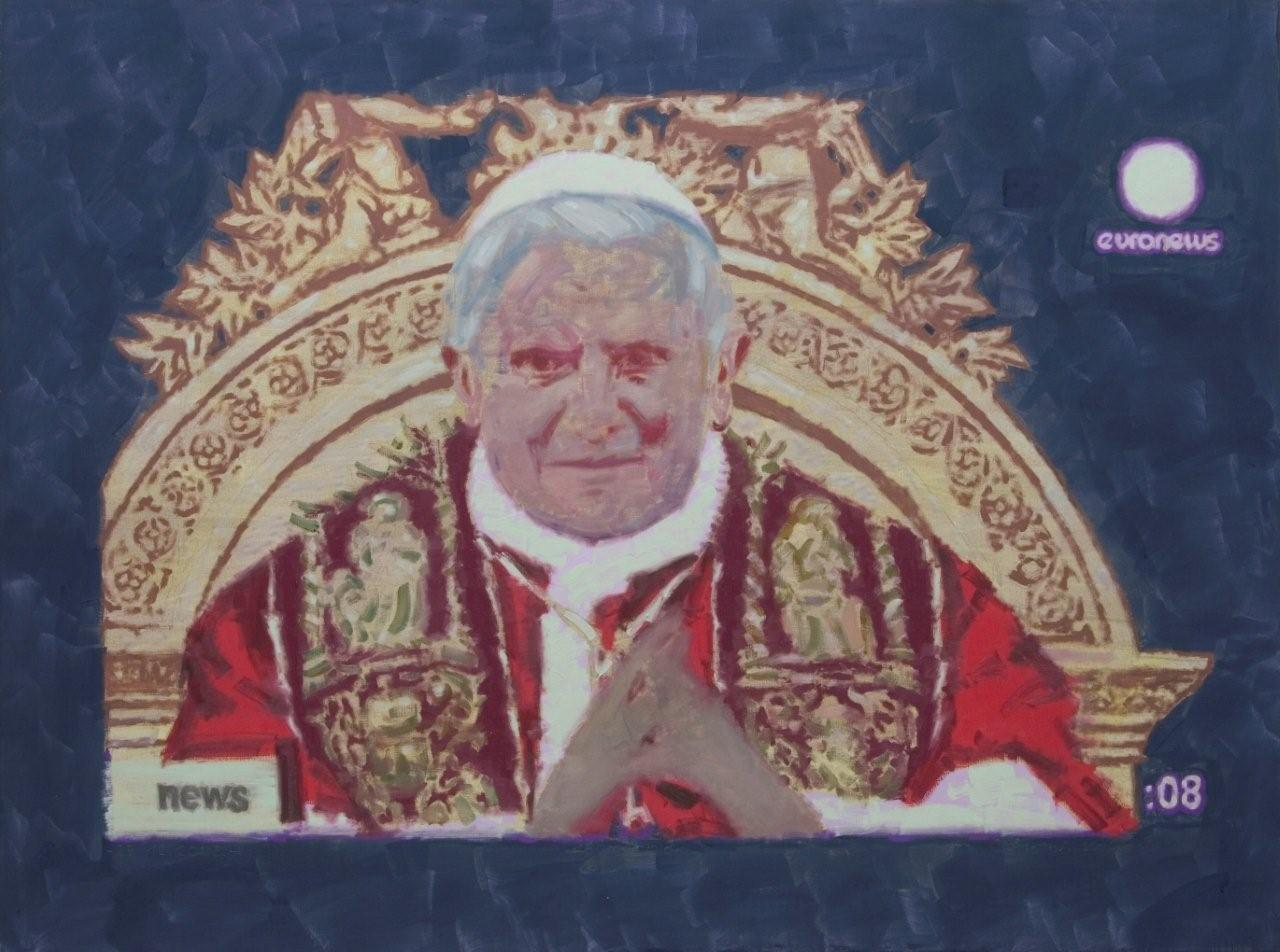
Oleg Tistol, Pope Benedict XVI. Oil on canvas.

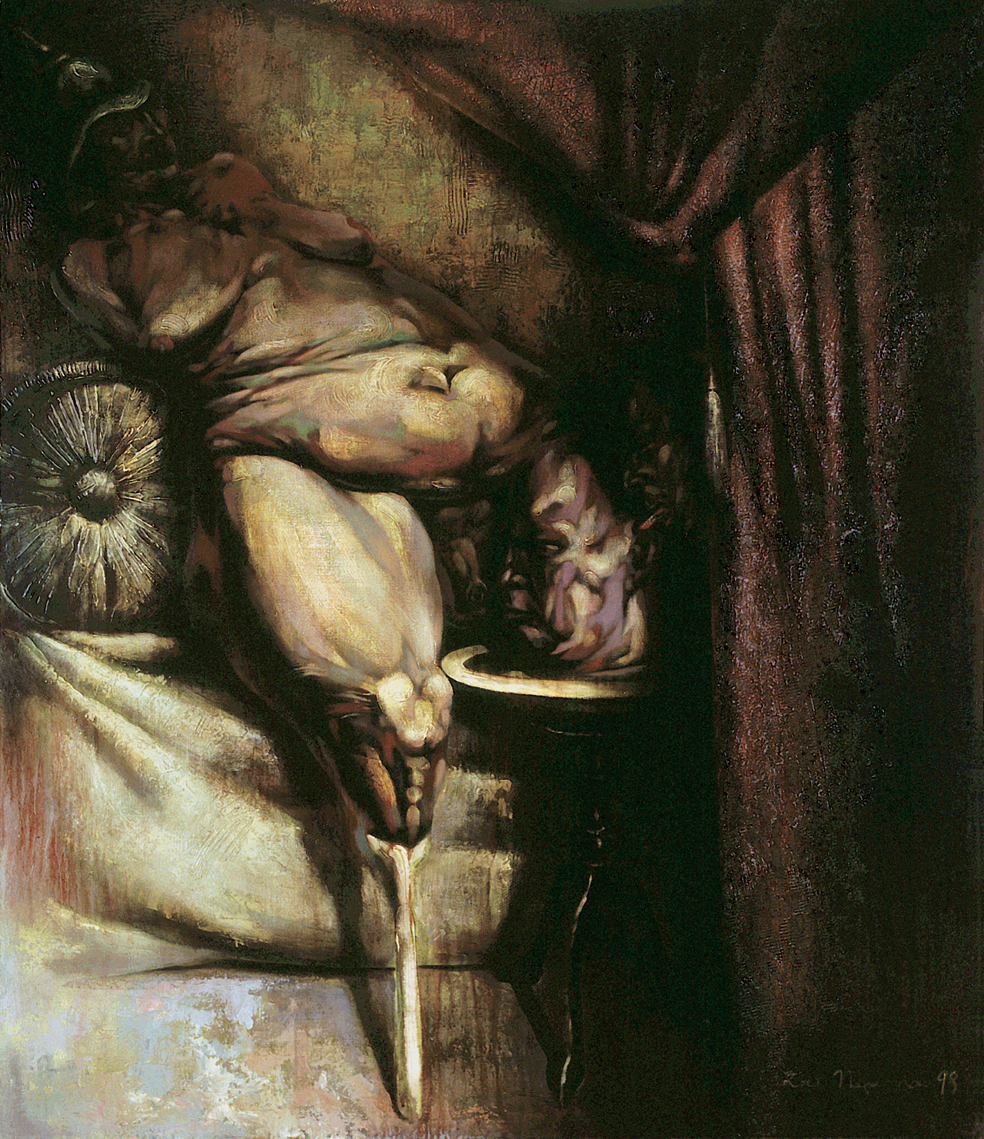
Ihor Podolchak, untitled painting, 1998.

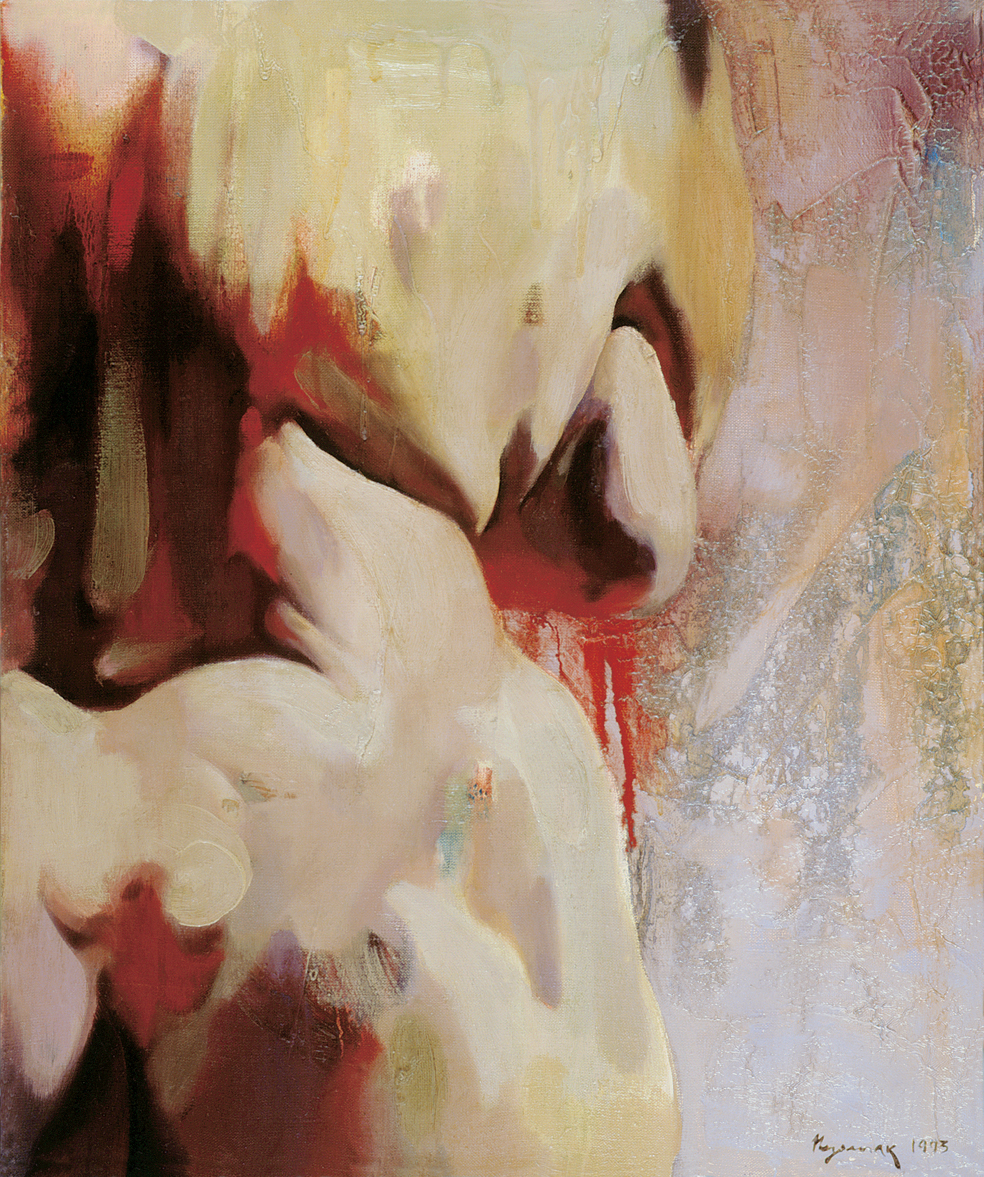
Ihor Podolchak, untitled painting, 1993.

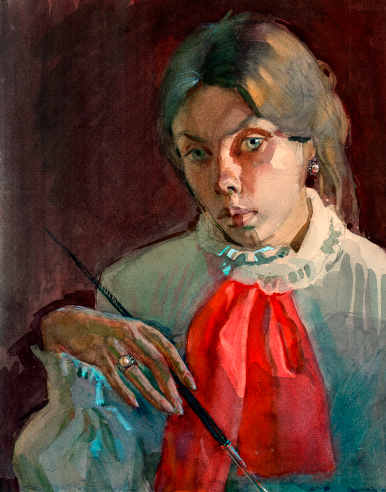
Oksana Ignaschenko, self-portrait. Oil on canvas.

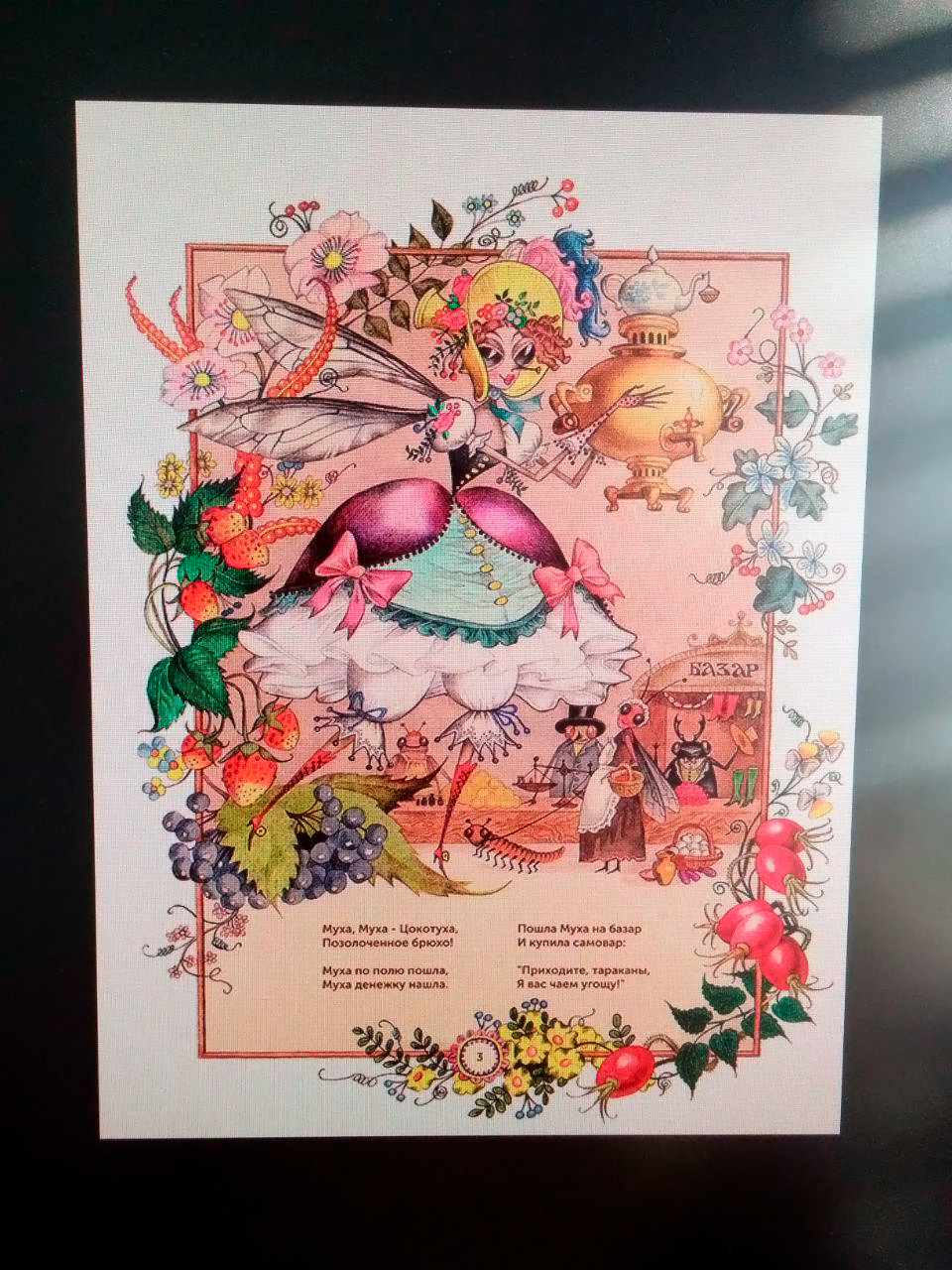
Oksana Ignaschenko, illustration Mukha-Tsokotukha.

== See also ==
- Arts of Ukraine
- Ukrainian avant-garde
- Ukrainian underground
