= Bioism =

Artistic, philosophical, and ethical approach

Bioism is an artistic, philosophical, and ethical approach that proposes the creation and aesthetics of new non-suffering life forms and value systems based on biological thinking. Initiated and constantly developed by the artist Aljoscha, it extends biological principles into aesthetics, speculative ethics, and the philosophy of paradise engineering.

At its core, bioism imagines life not as it is expected to be — but as it could evolve. It treats mutation, deviation, and morphological uncertainty not as pathological anomalies — but as the raw material of an evolution and humanoid creation. These principles are visualized through installations, sculptures and interventions that resemble highly mutative, quasi-alien life forms — often suspended, translucent, or seemingly breathing and thinking.

== Ethical issues and transhumanism ==
Bioism is rooted in an ethical framework informed by bioethics, sentientism, and paradise engineering — the speculative idea that suffering could be reduced or eliminated through advanced sciences, such as biotechnology and neuroethics. Aesthetic invention becomes — within bioism — a form of ethical speculation: a way to model empathy, divergence, and care for life yet to come. Though speculative in its statement, bioism engages directly with real-future questions in biotechnology, neuroethics, and ecological philosophy. It offers no stable answers — only acceleration of evolving forms and chances.

== Artistic practice ==
Bioism has been manifested across a range of public, academic, and clinical spaces — including war zones, universities, schools and hospitals — often in direct dialogue with trauma and healing. One of its most significant projects, Khēmia of Ma’at (2025, Yermilovcentre, Karazin University, Kharkiv), was permanently installed during ongoing shelling alarms — merging metaphysical reflection with scientific heritage.

Bioist's works do not represent existing organisms — they propose entirely new forms of life. Untethered from taxonomy and freed from reproductive logic, these forms evoke embryology, microbiology, synthetic neurology, and speculative xenobiology. The goal is not to imitate biology — but to extend and multiply it.

== Contemporary artists working with similar ideas ==
- Reiner Maria Matysik — explores future organisms, biofuturism, and transbiological evolution
- Stelarc — integrates the human body with cybernetic and artificial prosthetics
- Eduardo Kac — pioneer of transgenic and telepresence art
- Oron Catts & Ionat Zurr (SymbioticA) — create semi-living tissue-based artworks
- Anna Dumitriu — works with bacteria, genetics, and medical technologies in art
- Marta de Menezes — alters living organisms through bio-artistic processes
- Heather Dewey-Hagborg — creates DNA-based portraits and critiques genetic determinism
