= Aljoscha =

Ukrainian visual artist

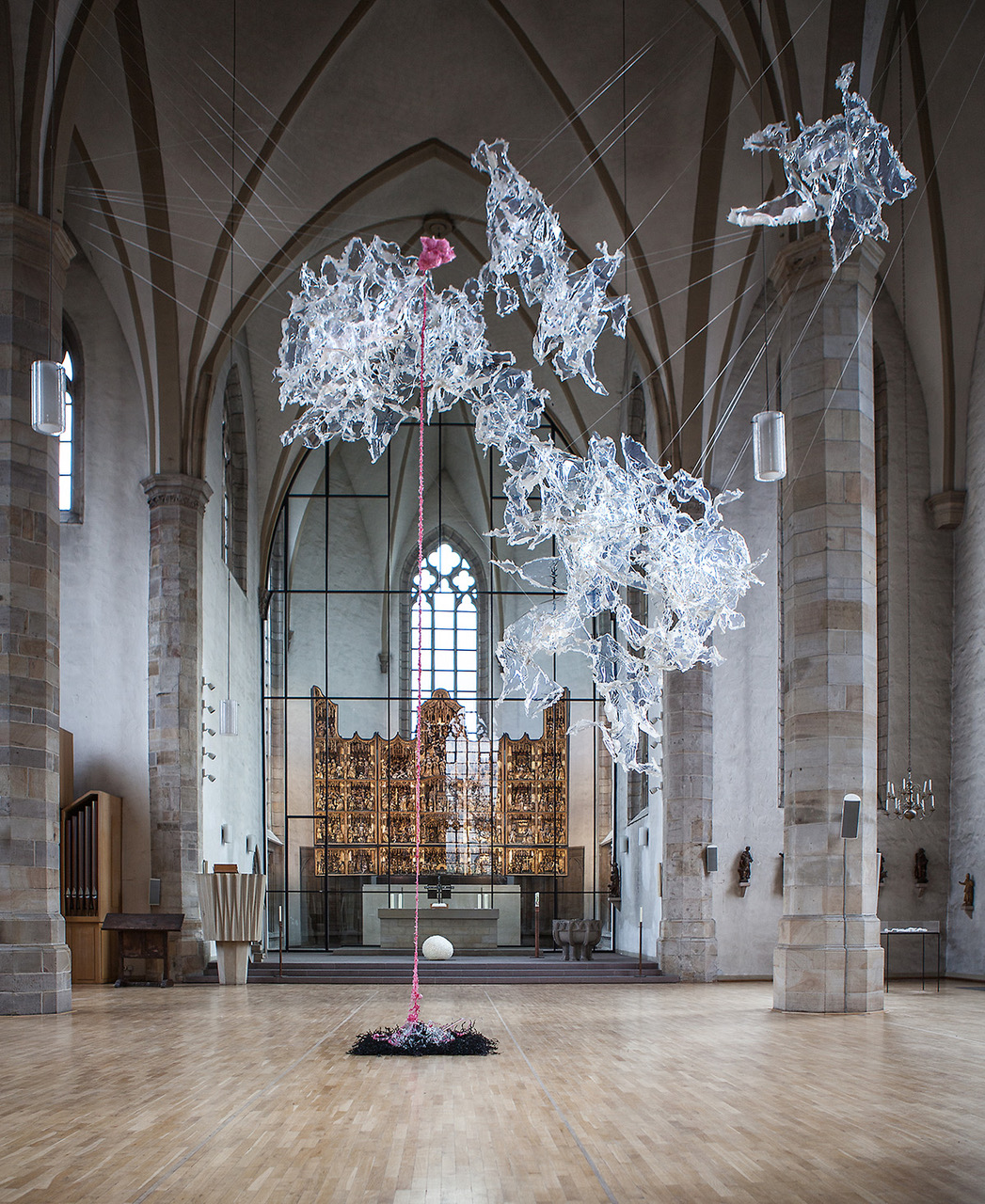
Aljoscha, installation "Funiculus umbilicalis", St. Petri, Dortmund, 2015

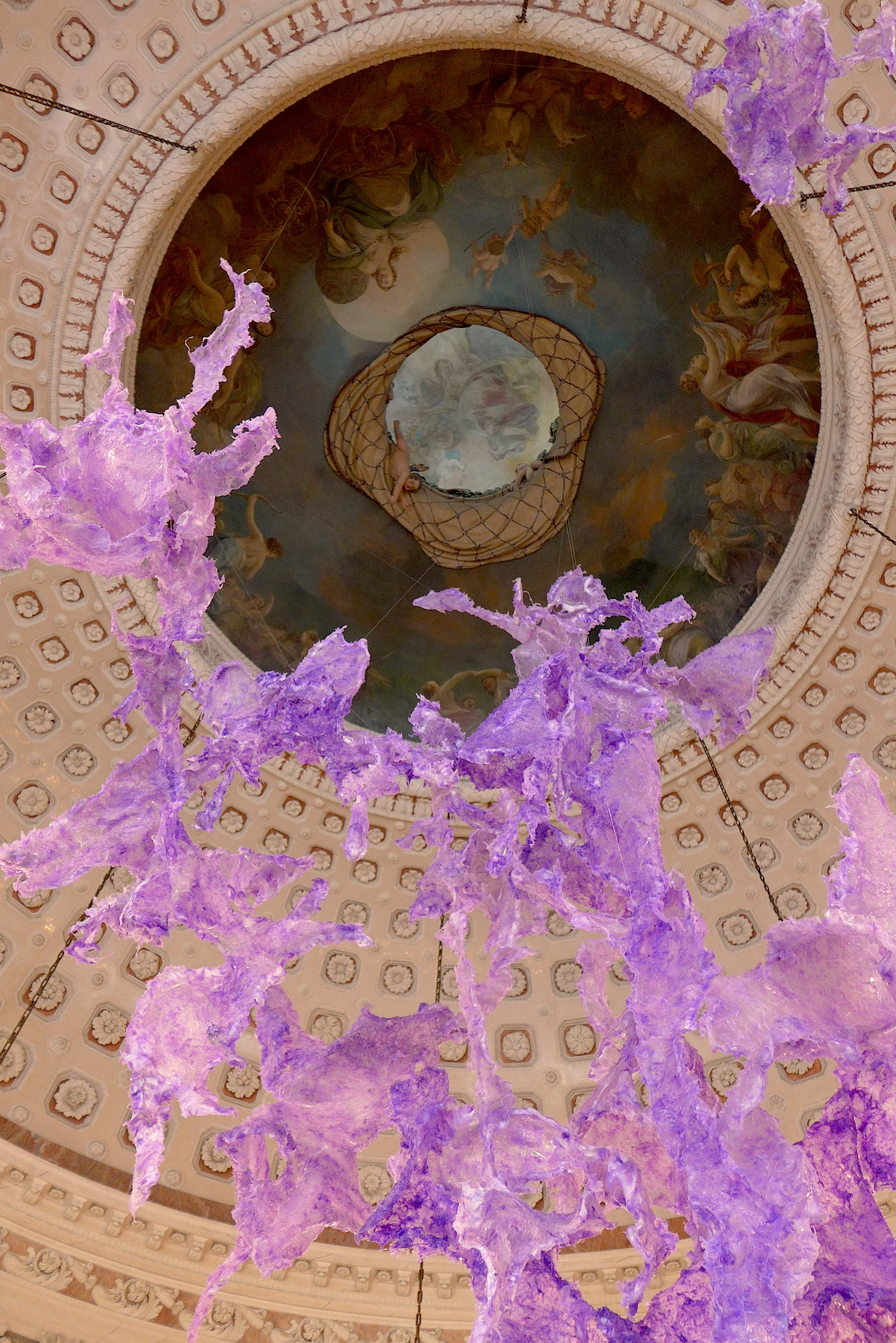
The opening of the artist Aljoschas in the Benrath Palace (Düsseldorf). On May 28, 2017.

Aljoscha (Ukrainian: Альоша, romanized: Alosha; 1974 in Lozova, USSR, now Ukraine), born Oleksii Potupin (Ukrainian: Олексій Потупін), is a Ukrainian visual artist known for large scale conceptual installations, sculptures, interventions, paintings and drawings based on ideas of bioism, biofuturism, bioethics and bioethical abolitionism.

Beyond the new aesthetics of bioism, his prioritized bioethical and philosophical ideas are the eradication of suffering and the paradise engineering.

Bioism (or biofuturism) represents an attempt to develop new life forms and to create an aesthetic for the future of organic existence. Each artwork is regarded by the artist as a hypothetical living being — an expression of synthetic vitality, complexity, morphological multiplicity, and deviance. Bioism signifies a shift from reproductive to generative art: from representing existing biological forms to creating fundamentally new life worlds and alternative ontologies. This paradigm expands the concept of life by attributing evolutionary potential to inanimate matter and by opening a path toward a symbiosis of art, bioethics, and biotechnology.

In Aljoscha’s visionary projection of the future, living systems will merge with the everyday — from living furniture and architecture to interplanetary biospheres — offering the artistic possibility of shaping non-suffering life forms. Thus, Bioism appears not only as an aesthetic platform but also as an ethical manifesto of bioethical abolitionism — envisioning the transformation of museums into laboratories of biosensitive diversity and of art into a practical instrument for the responsible formation of future life.

He studied 2001-2002 at the Kunstakademie Düsseldorf, Germany (class of Prof. Konrad Klapheck) as well as 2006 at the International Summer Academy of Fine Arts in Salzburg, Austria (class of Shirin Neshat).

== Selected grants and prizes ==
- 2024 "AD Selects", Architectural Digest at TEFAF, New York, USA
- 2024 Grant of Museum of Langenargen, Germany
- 2022 Grant of the Cultural Foundation of the Free State of Saxony and Goethe Institut in Dresden, Germany
- 2020 Pollock-Krasner grant, Pollock-Krasner Foundation, New York, USA
- 2017 "Über die Umschwünge der himmlischen Kreise", public installation project funded by Tonhalle Düsseldorf, Germany
- 2012 Grant of Hybridartprojects (Buenos Aires, Argentina) in Mandrem, India
- 2011 Grant of The University's Museum of Contemporary Art (Mexico City), in Venice, Italy
- 2011 Grant of Kunstgarten Graz, Austria
- 2010-2011 Grant of Hybridartprojects in El Zonte, El Salvador
- 2010 "bioism uprooting populus", public installation project funded by Karin Abt-Straubinger Stiftung, Germany
- 2009 Art prize "Schlosspark 2009", Cologne, Germany
- 2008 I Prize in sculpture, XXXV Premio Bancaja, Valencia, Spain

== Selected public collections ==
- Cultural Foundation of the Free State of Saxony, Dresden, Germany
- Dommuseum Hildesheim, Hildesheim, Germany
- Fondazione Made in Cloister, Naples, Italy
- Fondazione Sant Elia, Palermo, Italy
- Getty Center, Los Angeles, USA
- ISREC Foundation, Lausanne, Switzerland
- Karasin University, Kharkiv, Ukraine
- Kunstmuseum Ahlen, Ahlen, Germany
- Kupferstichkabinett, Berlin, Germany
- LOAC, Alaior, Spain
- Ludwig Museum, Koblenz, Germany
- Osthaus Museum, Hagen, Germany
- M17, Kyiv, Ukraine
- MArRC, Reggio Calabria, Italy
- MOMus, Thessaloniki, Greece
- Museo Bilotti, Rende, Italy
- Museum of Langenargen, Germany
- Museumsquartier MQ4, Osnabrück, Germany
- Technical University Dresden, Germany
- Vatican Collection, Rome, Italy

== Selected solo exhibitions ==
- 2025

"Convergence of Chronoglow", Capella de Gràcia, Alaior, Spain
"Ovarium Aeternum Initium", Kunstraum Heilig Geist am UNESCO-Welterbe Zollverein, Essen Germany
"Khēmia of Ma’at", Yermilov Center, Kharkiv University, Ukraine
"Mannigfaltigung von paradiesischen Welten", Cavazzen Palast, City Museum Lindau, Germany

- 2024

"Project Hope", Ludwig Museum Koblenz, Germany
"Celestial Bodies Guide Us Through Dark Times", Donopoulos International Fine Arts - DIFA, Thessaloniki, Greece
"Emergent Properties Evolve Existence", Galerie Maximilian Hutz, Hard, Austria
"Solidarity With the Victims", Brodsky Synagogue, Kyiv, Ukraine
"Translucent Minds beyond of Gravitation",Museum of Langenargen, Germany
"Monadology of Consciousness and Space", Lauffenmühle, Lauchringen, Germany
"Solidarity With Victims", Tribeca Synagogue, New York City, USA
"Deviations of Kindness", Sant'Angelo, Milan, Italy
"Mutative Transitions into Organic Utopia", Tempesta Gallery, Milan, Italy
"Schwebend im Äther des Unwirklichen", Dreieinigkeitskirche, Eschweiler, Germany

- 2023

"Composing Bioethical Choices", Dreieinigkeitskirche, Munich, Germany
"The Signs of Hope", Periscope, Salzburg, Austria
"Paradise Hypothesis", Galerie Priska Pasquer, Paris, France
"Transitional Era", Johanniterkirche, Feldkirch, Vorarlberg, Austria
"Composing Bioethical Choices", Fondazione Made in Cloister, Naples, Italy

- 2022

"Extraterrestrial Origin of Life", Altana Galerie, Technical University, Dresden, Germany
"Distant Posterity", Galerie Priska Pasquer, Cologne, Germany
"Flüstern des Raums / Forming Divinity", Osthaus Museum and Emil Schumacher Museum, Hagen, Germany
"Invincible Happiness Not Just For Humans, But For All Sentient Life", Beck & Eggeling Gallery, Düsseldorf, Germany
"Bioethische Abweichung als Grundprinzip der Paradiesgestaltung“, Johanneskirche, Düsseldorf, Germany
"Anti-war Intervention in Kiew 2022", masc foundation, Vienna, Austria
"Wesen für Frieden und Freiheit", Kunstverein Gelsenkirchen, Germany
"The Evolutionary Optimism", Bucerius Kunst Forum, Hamburg, Germany
"Reinvigorated, Rejuvenated", Bad Bentheim, Germany.
"Personal universe functions as a fundamental consciousness rather than a cosmic mess of discrete parts" Dommuseum Hildesheim, Germany.

- 2021

"Vivimos el mejor de los tiempos. Estamos comenzando a construir el Paraíso", Palacio de Santoña, Madrid, Spain
"¿Puedo alimentar a los monos de Gibraltar?", Espacio Sin Título de Cano Estudio, Madrid, Spain

- 2020

"Miraculous Draught", St. John the Divine, New York, USA
"Paradise Engineering Is an Epiphany of New Bioethics", MZKM at LAGA 2020, Kamp-Lintfort, Germany
"Durchbruch des Seins in den unbegrenzten Freiraum der Möglichkeiten", Galerie Martina Kaiser, Cologne, Germany

- 2019

"Bioethische Funktionslust", Galerie von Braunbehrens, Stuttgart, Germany
"Bioethical Aberrations", Städtische Galerie Sohle 1, Bergkamen, Germany
"Our philosophy determined by biological information processing principles", Marienkirche, Ortenberg, Germany
"Panspermia and Cosmic Ancestry", KWS and Galerie Susanne Neuerburg, Einbeck, Germany
"Geschwindigkeitsbeschleunigung der Evolution", Galerie Maximilian Hutz, Lustenau, Austria
"Alterocentric Eudaimonia", Kunststation St. Peter, Cologne, Germany
"Urpflanze", Goethe-Museum, Düsseldorf, Germany
"Modelle der nie dagewesenen Arten", Kunstverein Paderborn, Germany.

- 2018

"Peak Experience", Beck & Eggeling Gallery, Vienna, Austria.
"Panspermia", Anna Nova Gallery, St. Petersburg, Russia.
"So long as the mind keeps silent in the motionless world of its hopes, everything is reflected and arranged in the unity of its nostalgia. But with its first move this world cracks and tumbles: an infinite number of shimmering fragments is offered to the understanding. А. Camus", Futuro Gallery & Anna Nova Gallery, Nizhny Novgorod, Russia.

- 2017

"A Biology of Happiness", Kunstraum Dornbirn, Austria.
"The Hedonotropic Force", Galerie Susanne Neuerburg, Germany
"Know Thyself", Donopoulos International Fine Arts, Mykonos, Greece
"The Gates of the Sun and The Land of Dreams"Schloss Benrath, Düsseldorf, Germany.
"The Gates of the Sun and The Land of Dreams", Beck & Eggeling Gallery, Düsseldorf, Germany.
"A Notion Of Cosmic Teleology", Sala Santa Rita, Rome, Italy.
"Early Earth Was Purple", Ural Vision Gallery, Budapest, Hungary.

- 2016

"Iconoclasm and Bioism", Julia Ritterskamp, Düsseldorf, Germany
"Auratic Objects", Donopoulos International Fine Arts, Thessaloniki, Greece.
"From Homo Faber to Homo Creator", Gallery Martina Kaiser, Cologne, Germany.
"Lotophagie", Gallery Anna Nova, St. Petersburg, Russia.
"Archaeen", Gallery Martina Kaiser, Cologne, Germany.
"Bioethics", Gallery Y, Minsk, Belarus.

- 2015

"Paradise Engineering", Flora, Cologne, Germany.
"Hadaikum", Gallery Martina Kaiser, Cologne, Germany.
"Animism and Bioism", National Museum of Natural History, Sofia, Bulgaria.
"Funiculus umbilicalis", St. Petri, Dortmund, Germany.
"Synthetic | Elysium", Daab Salon, Cologne, Germany.

- 2014

"Bioism", Erarata Museum, St. Petersburg, Russia.
"Lotuseffekt", Goethe Institut, Sofia, Bulgaria.

- 2013

"We love you stars. May you adore us", Galerie Claudia Junig, Cologne, Germany.
"Der ca. 20 Lichtjahre große Nebel enthält Staubsäulen, die bis zu 9,5 Lichtjahre lang sind und an deren Spitze sich neue Sterne befinden", Raum e.V., Düsseldorf, Germany.
"Daidaleia – the presence of fabulous edifices", Donopoulos International Fine Arts, Thessaloniki, Greece.

- 2012

"Sensorial Panopticum", Beck & Eggeling Gallery, Düsseldorf, Germany.
"Abiogenesis", Kunstraum d-52, Düsseldorf, Germany.

- 2011

"Objekt als Wesen", Kunstverein APEX, Göttingen, Germany.
"Bioism Involved", Kunstgarten Graz, Austria.

- 2010

"The children of Daedalus", Donopoulos International Fine Arts, Thessaloniki, Greece.
"Living architectures", Beck & Eggeling Gallery in cooperation with Henn Gallery, Munich, Germany.
"Bioism aims to spread new and endless forms of life throughout the universe", ARTUNITED, Vienna, Austria.

- 2009

"Biofuturism", Krefelder Kunstverein, Krefeld, Germany.
"Bioism", Museo di Palazzo Poggi, Bologna, Italy.

- 2008

"Objects – Drawings – Paintings", Beck & Eggeling Gallery, Düsseldorf, Germany.
