= Szuper Gallery =

Art collective

Szuper Gallery is a contemporary art collective consisting of artists Susanne Clausen and Pavlo Kerestey based in London, England and Munich, Germany. Their work mainly involves video and sound installations, performances and more - known for works such as Liftarchiv; a piece intended as a dynamic art space in the form of a lift, located in the city's local administration office or Kreisverwaltungsreferat, as well as Liquid Trust, a video and performance shown originally at the Western Front Art Centre Vancouver in 2014.

== Works ==
=== Liftarchiv ===
Liftarchiv, Liftarchiv or Lift Archive is a project by Szuper Gallery in 2007 that focuses around a glass elevator made for the Munich local administration office, or Kreisverwaltungsreferat. It is glass cube that can be fully raised or lowered, containing an archive of the project, changing throughout. It responds to the location; responsible for immigration as well as law and order in the works displayed, responding to a brief that aimed at making the institution more open and transparent.

In the book, the project is described as "A mobile, performative object made for the Kreisverwaltungsreferat (KVR), the district authority. Szuper Gallery has mounted a glass cube onto a lift in the foyer of the KVR, which functions as an archive for the project. A series of events accompanies this sculpture and the archive is continuously being added to. The Liftarchiv aims for a public dialogue."

The Liftarchiv book published in 2007, was written by Susanne Clausen and Pavlo Kerestey about the project and includes texts by Wilfried Blume-Beyerle, Michael Hauffen, Monika Pemler, Dorothee Richter, Peter Suchin, Heinz Schütz and Dirk Snauwaert.

=== Liquid Trust ===
Liquid trust is an abstract and surreal video that is combined with live performance and music, and has been shown in many venues across the world, including the Western Front Art Centre in Vancouver, Canada, and the Institute of Contemporary Arts in London, England. All showings used different experimentations of the combinations between sound and video, featuring different artists and performers.

The ICA describes the piece as "Reflecting on accelerated states of labour, leisure, and social interaction, Liquid Trust takes inspiration from the “trust molecule” or “love hormone” oxytocin, sometimes prescribed for anxiety and designed to increase an individual’s social integration and trust. The performance evolves as a site for video and performance combining image, sound, music and spoken word. Surreal cinematic images, a libretto consisting of singular and polyphonic layering performed by a choir are scored by a musician and pre-recorded sound that creates a visual and acoustic spectacle".

The Western Front Arts Centre also describes the piece as "This is their third collaboration with video, sound, text, by the Szuper Gallery duo Susanne Clausen, and Pavlo Kerestey and spoken word created and performed by Michele Sereda of Curtain Razors, Regina, SK. The performance also includes original composition by musician-in-residence Ben Brown performed with the China Cloud ensemble (Elisa Thorn, harp; Dominic Conway, saxophone; Colin Cowan, contrabass; Ben Brown, drums), and the Express Your Voice and VOICE OVER mind choirs".
