= Susanne Clausen =

German artist, curator and professor of fine art

- Born: Germany
- Education: Academy of Fine Arts, Munich; Slade School of Fine Art (MA)
- Occupations: Artist, Curator, Professor
- Employer: University of Reading
- Known for: Founder of Reading International; Head of Art (2011–2017)
- Notable work: Szuper Gallery (with Pavlo Kerestey)
- Movement: Multimedia art, Performance art
- Website: www.szuper.org

Susanne Clausen is a German and British artist, curator and professor of fine art at the University of Reading. She works often in collaboration with Pavlo Kerestey under the name Szuper Gallery, under which she publishes most of her works consisting mainly of performances, videos and multi-media installations, paintings and drawings. For the University of Reading, apart from being a professor, she holds the title of director and founder of Reading International, also serving as the head of Art between 2011 and 2017.

She has lived and worked in Munich, Germany, London and Reading England, having exhibited across the world in galleries and art spaces spanning from the Institute of Contemporary Arts London to the Western Front Arts Centre Vancouver and the Perm Museum of Contemporary Art Russia.

== Life and work ==
Clausen first studied fine art at the Academy of Fine Art Munich, Germany, or Akademie der Bildenden Künste München between 1988 and 1994. She then studied at the Slade School of Fine Art, London England (Part of the University College London) between 1997 and 1999, where she received an MA in fine art media.

=== Szuper Gallery ===
Together with artist Pavlo Kerestey, Clausen has worked under the name Szuper Gallery. What originated as an actual gallery based in Munich Germany, now serves as a name for a variety of pieces with well-known projects such as Liftarchiv, or Luquid Trust. Szuper Gallery generally specialises in multimedia installations but has worked in a large range of mediums.

=== University of Reading ===
Between 2011 and 2017, Clausen served as the head of the Reading School of Art, or Department of Art (previously).

In 2016, she founded the Reading International arts festival as part of the UoR and the Reading Year of Culture. This project brings together artists and performers from across the world to show in the town of Reading and is self described as "Led by artists from the Reading School of Art at the University of Reading and hosted by a rich mixture of partners within the town, Reading International produces several major projects each year, in which artists and curators are given a platform to make new work in response to the unique social and historical context of Reading and wider Berkshire".
