= Boris Mikhailov =

Boris Mikhailov may refer to:

- Boris Mikhailov (Comintern), representative of the Communist International to the US in 1929-30
- Boris Mikhailov (photographer) (born 1938), fine art photographer
- Boris Mikhailov (ice hockey) (born 1944), former Soviet international ice hockey player
- Borislav Mihaylov (1963–2026), President of the Bulgarian Football Union, and former Bulgarian international
