= Pavlo Makov =

Ukrainian artist

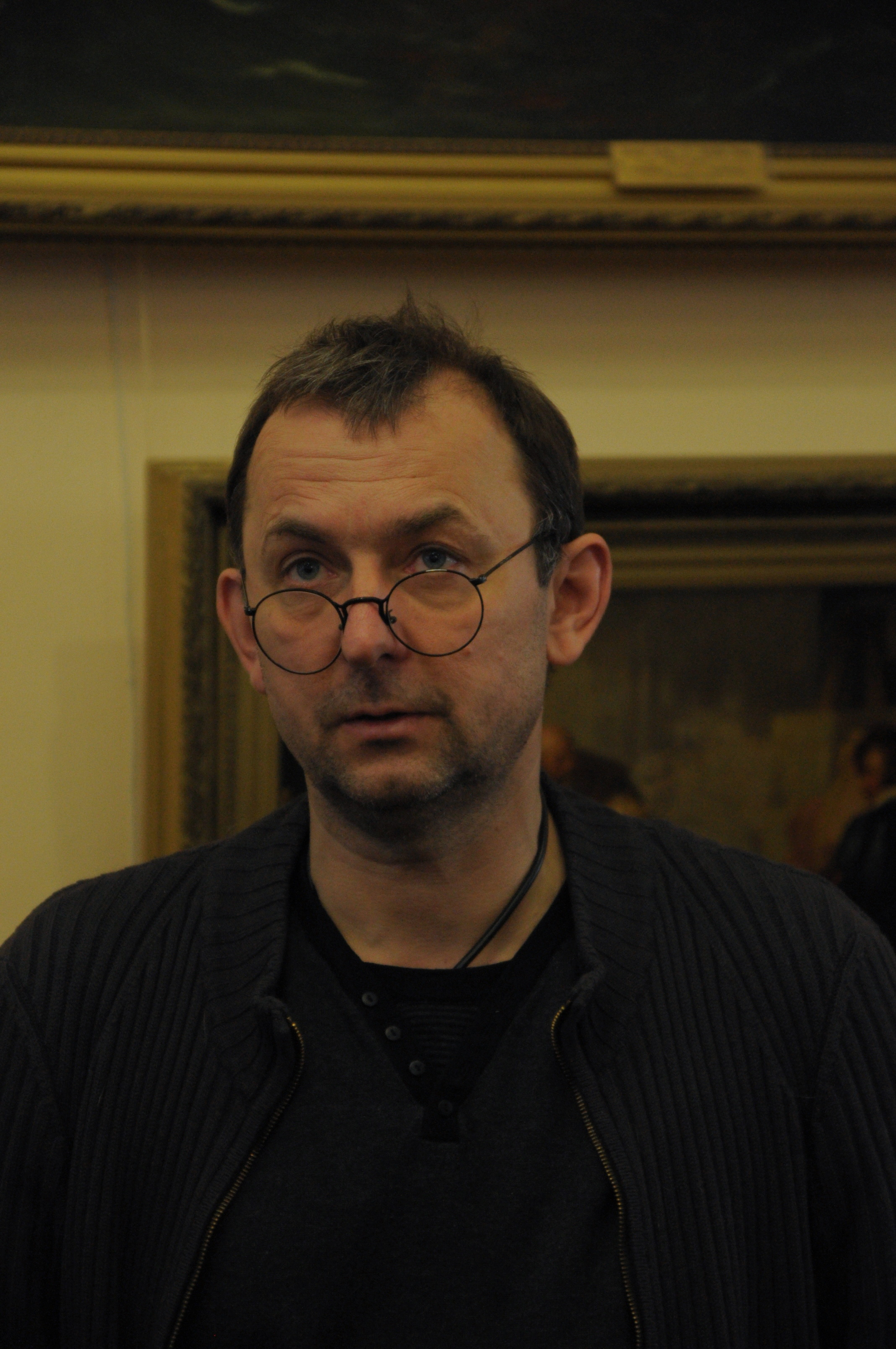
Pavlo Makov

Pavlo Mykolaiovych Makov (Ukrainian: Павло Миколайович Маков; born August 28, 1958, in Leningrad) is a Ukrainian artist. He is a Member of the Royal Society of Painters and Graphic Artists of Great Britain, a Corresponding Member of the National Academy of Arts of Ukraine, and a Laureate of the Taras Shevchenko National Prize of Ukraine (2018).

== Biography ==
He was born on August 28, 1958, in Leningrad in a family of doctors. When Makov was five years old, his parents moved to Ukraine, where he lived for some time in Rivne, Kyiv, and Simferopol. He studied at an art school for three years. Until the eighth grade, he was mainly interested in biology and literature.

In 1974, he entered the Crimean Art School named after MS Samokish in Simferopol, which he graduated in 1979. From 1977 to 1978 he studied at the St. Petersburg Academy of Arts, and from 1979 – at the Faculty of Graphics at the Kharkiv Art and Industrial Institute, which he graduated in 1984. As a child, Makov studied at a school with in-depth study of English and later worked with a teacher to whom he wrote letters from the army in English. For some time he worked as a master printer and taught.

In 1988, the Sumy State Art Museum acquired three works by Makov. In the same year, Makov became a member of the Union of Artists of Ukraine, and the following year won the Grand Prix at the All-Union Biennial of Easel Graphics in Kaliningrad. In 1991, four works by Makov were purchased by the Tretyakov Gallery. Since 1994, Makov has been a member of the Royal Society of Painters and Graphic Artists of Great Britain, where he taught at the Royal College of Art in the early 1990s. Since 2007, he is a Corresponding Member of the Academy of Arts of Ukraine.

Makov is interested in modern Ukrainian literature. In the 1990s, he was acquainted with the work of Yurii Andrukhovych and Oksana Zabuzhko, the latter advised him to read Taras Prokhasko.

He lives and works in Kharkiv.

In 2022, Pavlo Makov took part in the opening of the Ukrainian pavilion at the Venice Biennale. He presented the installation "Fountain of Exhaustion".

== Works by Pavlo Makov ==
Makov's works are exhibited in the Victoria and Albert Museum (London), the National Art Gallery (Kyiv), the Center for Contemporary Art (Osaka), the State Tretyakov Gallery (Moscow), the Museum of Contemporary Art (Ibiza) and others museums. Pavlo Makov's works were also exhibited at the Sotheby's auction (2009).

Makov began working on the creation of artist's books in 1992, and has made many since then.

== Views ==
Speaking about the identity of a modern artist, Makov calls himself a Ukrainian artist, given that he lives in Ukraine and understands the Ukrainian reality. He compares his situation with the problems of self-representation of Catalan artists, but at the same time opposes the fact that contemporary art is based on folklore.

In May 2011, Makov met the American philosopher and literary theorist Hans Ulrich Gumbrecht, who visited his workshop during his stay in Kharkiv. Regarding this visit, Makov said: "This is the first time I have seen someone describe in words what I do. I don't deny postmodernism, I just couldn't find my place there. And Humbrecht showed me where I was."

== See also ==
- Yermilov Centre

== Bibliography ==
- Маков, Павло. Авторські книжки та щоденники. — К.: Видавництва «Артбук», «Дух і Літера», 2007. Погортати PDF.
- Маков, Павел. Utopia. Хроники 1992–1995. — Харьков: Дух і Літера, 2005. — 208 с. — ISBN 966-378-011-8 Погортати PDF.
- Маков, Павло. Книга Днів. — К.: ЦСМ, 2000.
- Маков, Павло. Анатомія Мішені та всі, всі, всі…. — Прага, 1999.
- Маков, Павло. Наш пейзаж. — К.: ЦСМ, Київ, 1998.
- The best of printmaking : an international collection. — Gloucester, Mass. : Quarry Books; Cincinnati, Ohio, 1997. — 160 p. — ISBN 1564963713.
