= Johanneskirche, Düsseldorf =

Largest Protestant church in Düsseldorf

Coordinates: 51°13′28″N 6°46′57″E

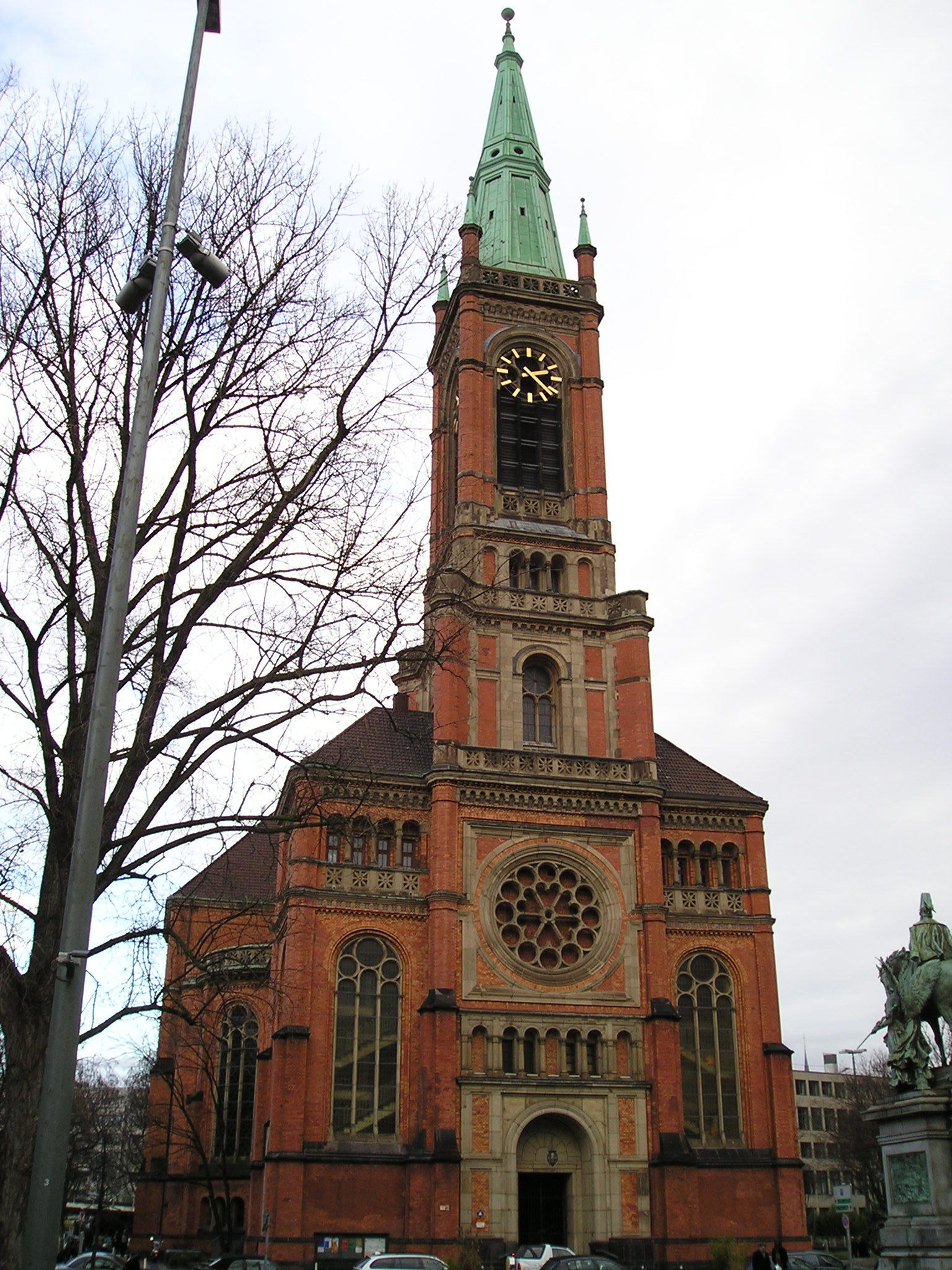
The Facade of the Johanneskirche.

St John's Church (German: Johanneskirche), with its almost 88 m high tower, is the largest Protestant church in Düsseldorf. It is located at the Martin-Luther-Platz. The church was built from 1875 to 1881 in the Romanesque Revival style. It was severely damaged in World War II, but was saved from destruction and in 1953 it was reopened. The last major remodeling took place in 2008. There is a cafe through which one enters the actual church.

== Bells ==
The church has 5 bells:

One cast in 1860, one cast in 1782, and Three cast in 1952.
