= Yermilov Centre =

Modern art museum in Kharkiv, Ukraine

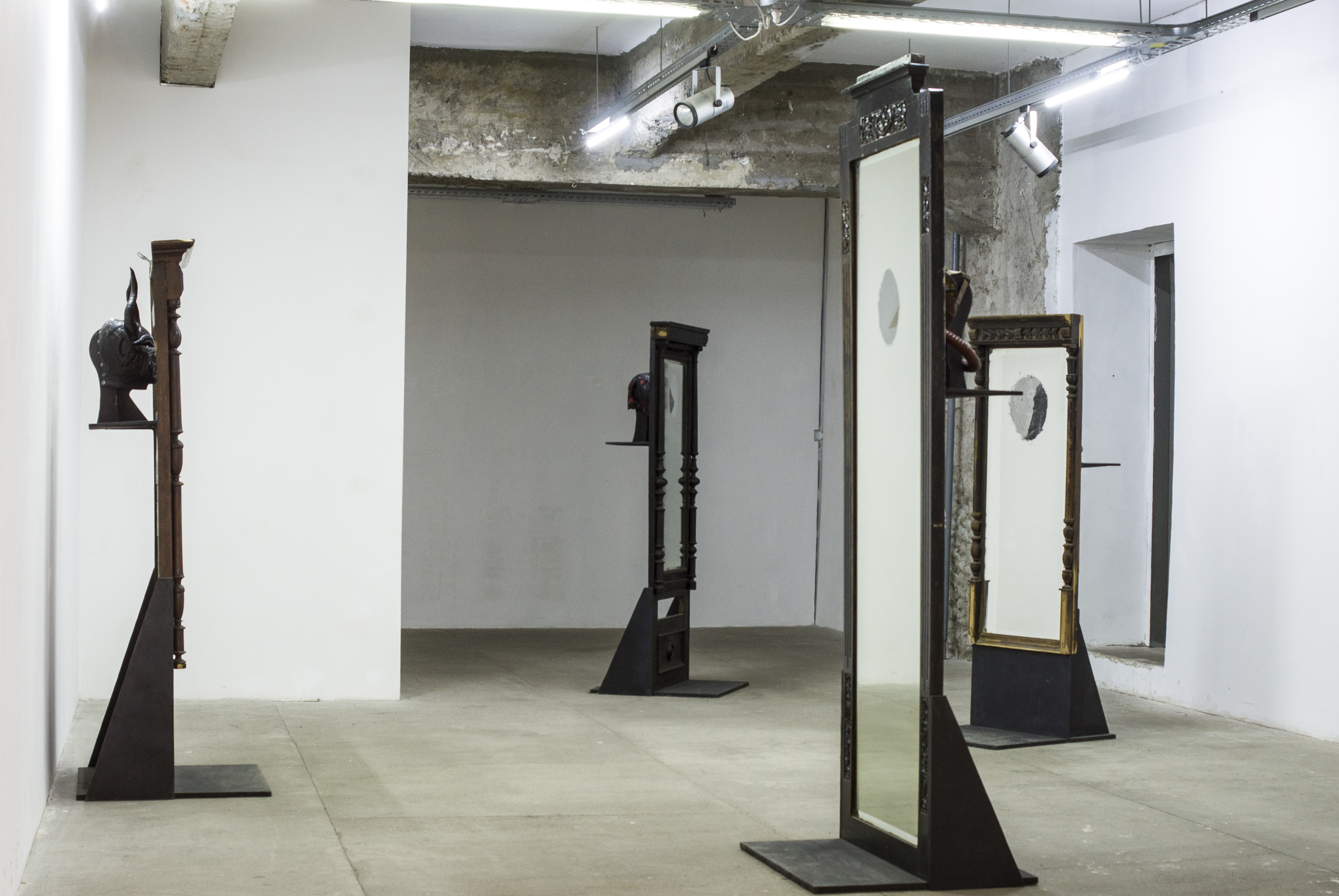
Exhibition "Objects" at the Yermilov Contemporary Art Center.

The Yermilov Center (Ukrainian: ЄрміловЦентр) is a centre of contemporary art in Kharkiv, Ukraine, which opened in March 2012. It is named after the famous Kharkiv artist, representative of the Ukrainian avant-garde, Vasyl Yermylov. Yermilov Centre is a multifunctional space for exhibition projects and interaction between artists, curators, critics, and researchers. The areas of activity of the center include exhibition projects, art residencies, educational projects, lectures and discussions, seminars, etc.

== Appearance and design of the center ==
The interior design was proposed by Kharkiv architects and designers Igor Ostapenko, Inna Pedan, and Andriy Khvorostyanov. The Yermilov Center was established and opened with the support of the Association of Alumni, Teachers, and Friends of the V.N. Karazin Kharkiv National University.

== Opening and first years of operation ==
On March 22, 2012, on Vasily Ermilov's birthday, the grand opening of the Exhibition Center for Contemporary Art "Yermilov Center" took place. On this occasion, a press conference was held with the participation of the center's director Natalia Ivanova, director of the Kharkiv Municipal Gallery Tatiana Tumasyan, and Kharkiv artists Pavlo Makov and Roman Minin.

The exhibition that opened "Yermilov Center," "Construction. From constructivism to contemporary. Kharkiv 20th-21st Centuries," has become a kind of bridge between avant-garde constructivists of the beginning of the last century and modern Ukrainian artists. The curator of the exhibition: Tatiana Tumasyan.

The exhibition brings together works by classics Vasily Yermilov and Boris Kosarev and contemporary Kharkiv artists of three generations: Vitaly Kulikov, Pavlo Makov, Artem Volokitin, Roman Minin, Hamlet Zinkovsky, and Alina Kleitman.

In total, during the first year of its existence, the Center opened six expositions to the audience. Among them is the exhibition of Alexander Gnilitsky "GNILITSKY. Darwin Street," curated by Lesya Zayats and Oksana Barshinova, and Viktor Sidorenko's personal exhibition "Reflection in the unknown."

In 2013, a personal exhibition "Unrespectable. Retrospective" by Boris Mikhailov, world-famous photographer, winner of the prestigious Hasselblad Foundation Award, representative of the Kharkiv School of photography. The Curator: Tatiana Tumasyan.

In the same year, the first foreign exhibition "The Legacy and Myth of Viktor Vasarely" was held at the Yermilov Center with the support of the Hungarian Embassy in Ukraine. More than 100 works by the Hungarian-French artist, founder of optical art (op-art) were presented.

2014 was marked by two international cooperation projects at once: "Slovenia / ART scanning" (participants: Roman Minin, Alexey Yalovega, Oleg Vinnik — Shtepe, Vladislav Bondarenko) on the initiative of the Honorable Consulate of the Republic of Slovenia and the exhibition of the Polish poster “Wealth of Form, Fertility of Thought” in cooperation with the Consulate General of the Republic of Poland. In addition, a large curatorial project "Svoi" was held, which was attended by the National Industry, European standard, GAZ, Andrey Zelinsky, Oleg Tistol, Nikolay Matsenko, Marina Skugareva, Roman Minin, Alexey Sai, Yuri Pikul, Pavel Kerestey, Zakenty Gorobyov, Yuri Efanov. The Curators: AKM-14 (Igor Abramovich, Sergey Kanzedal, Natalia Matsenko).

In 2015, the center hosted an exhibition of the famous Kharkiv architect Oleg Drozdov "Terralogy", which consisted of four sections: "Chemistry-Geography-Architecture," "Time—Space-Geography," "Time-Chemistry-Architecture," and "Architecture-Landscape-Geography."

The main foreign project of 2015 was the exhibition "Neorealism. Polish photography. The 1950s and 1960s." It featured works by Polish artists Jerzy Lewczynski, Marek Piasecki, Tadeusz Rolke, Sofia Ridet, and others. It is important that in addition to the exhibition itself, a conference was held, where representatives of the Polish and Ukrainian scientific and artistic spheres spoke.

== See also ==
- Pavlo Makov
- List of Ukrainian artists
