= Mykhailo Moroz =

Ukrainian painter (1904–1992)

- Михайло Ілліч Мороз
- Born: 7 July 1904; Plikhiv, Austria-Hungary (now Ukraine)
- Died: 27 September 1992 (aged 88); Staten Island, New York, U.S.
- Education: Oleksa Novakivskyi Art School, Académie Julian
- Occupation: Painter

Mykhailo Moroz (Ukrainian: Михайло Ілліч Мороз; 7 July 1904 – 27 September 1992) was a Ukrainian painter.

In 1931 he became a member of the Association of Independent Ukrainian Artists, and in 1949 he joined the Ukrainian Artist's Association in USA. In 1980 he became an academician of the Accademia di San Luca in Rome.

== Biography ==
Mykhailo Moroz was born on 7 July 1904 in Plikhiv, now Ternopil Oblast, Ukraine.

During 1917–1921, he participated in the liberation struggle for the Ukrainian state. In 1927 he graduated from the Oleksa Novakivskyi Art School. In 1928, thanks to a scholarship from Metropolitan Andrei Sheptytskyi, he began his studies at the Académie Julian, graduating in 1930. Moroz's fresco "Hutsulka" was left at the Académie Julian for its high skill.

In Paris, he was a member of the society of young Ukrainian artists (Oleksii Hryshchenko, Mykola Hlushchenko, Vasyl Khmeliuk, Sviatoslav Hordynskyi, Vasyl Perebyinis), and also had creative contacts with famous French masters, made friends with Henri Matisse, and studied in the studio of Antoine Bourdelle. Matisse called Moroz a poet of water and even bought one of his Normandy views, fascinated by the dynamic force of the wave crashing on the rocky shore. At that time, Moroz and Hordynskyi traveled all over France.

In 1932 he became an assistant to Oleksa Novakivskyi, and in 1939 he began working as a professor of art at the Theological Academy in Lviv.

In 1945, he moved to Germany, where he sang in the emigrant choir "Surma". In 1949, he emigrated to the United States. In 1967, 1972–1975, he was in Rome, where he painted 6 portraits for Patriarch Josyf Slipyj, completed a stained-glass window project for the Santi Sergio e Bacco, as well as three projects for the mosaic decoration of the pediment of Santa Sofia a Via Boccea. He also painted 45 landscapes of Rome and its surroundings.

Art historian Dariia Darevych notes that Mykhailo Moroz in his late painting moved in the direction of abstract expressionism, which dominated America at the time, thus fitting Ukrainian art into the global context.

He died on 27 September 1992 in the borough of Staten Island, New York. He is buried in Bound Brook, New Jersey, the U.S.

== Creativity ==
In 1925, he began participating in exhibitions. His personal exhibitions took place in Lviv (1925, 1934, 1942–1943), Kyiv (1941), Munich (1946), Regensburg (1947–1948; both in Germany), Miami (Florida, USA, 1954), New York (1959–1963, 1981, 1990), Paris (1961–1962), Toronto (1964), Philadelphia (Pennsylvania, USA, 1991) and Ternopil (1997).

In 1952, 14 paintings stored in the National Museum of Lviv were destroyed. Some of the works were transferred by Moroz's widow to the Ukrainian Museum in New York.

The works of Moroz include portraits, expressionist landscapes, and still lifes, among others: "Kosmatskyi vodospad" (1926), "Kosmatska richka Pistynka" (1927), "Hutsulskyi peizazh" (1930s.), "Avtoportret" (1932), "Andrei Sheptytskyi pid chas Sluzhby Bozhoi" (1937), "Materynstvo (Druzhyna z synom)" (1944), "Poluden nad Dunaiem" (1949), "Morskyi prybii. Buria" (1961), "Ukrainska tserkva v Hanteri" (1963), "Hirska symfoniia" (1964), "Druzhyna" (1965), "Arka Tytao", "Kolizei", "Vyd na Monte-Kavo" (all – 1967–1975), "Osinnia symfoniia" (1968), "Morskyi prybii" (1969), "Sobor sv. Sofii u Rymi", "Hutsulka" (both from the 1970s.), "Koliadky" (1970), "Mytropolyt Andrei Sheptytskyi. Molytva" (1972), "Rozhi na synomu tli" (1973), cycle "Tserkva sv. Sofii" (1973–1974), "Kardynal Yosyf Slipyi", "Polovi kvity", "U kvitakh. Monastyr studytiv u Kastel Gandolfo", "Ozero Albano. Kastel Gandolfo" (all – 1974), "Mist i zamok sv. Anhela u Rymi" (1975).

== Bibliography ==
- L. Voloshyn (2024). "Мороз Михайло". Мистецька школа Олекси Новаківського 1923-1935. Життя у перспективі часу (in Ukrainian). Lviv–Drohobych: Kolo. p. 244—248, 398—401. ISBN 978-617-642-676-9.
