= Ukrainian Artist's Association in USA =

Organization

The Ukrainian Artist's Association in USA (Ukrainian: Об'єднання митців-українців в Америці) is an organization of Ukrainian artists in the United States, established in New York City in 1952.

== History of creation ==
The New York-based organization was founded on 10 May 1952, at the Congress of Ukrainian Artists from the United States, which was convened on the initiative of the Association of Ukrainian Artists of New York and the Vicinity. The congress was held at the Literary and Art Club (LAC) in New York. Delegates to the Congress included artists of the first emigration and new settlers, representatives of local Ukrainian art groups from Philadelphia and San Francisco; written greetings were sent by artists from Minnesota who were unable to attend the Congress in person.

The meeting elected the following members to the Main Board of the organization: Chairman – SerhiI Lytvynenko; Deputy Chairmen – Volodymyr Sichynskyi and Sviatoslav Hordynskyi; Secretary – Oksana Shaves; Treasurer – Ivan Polovoda; Board members – Petro Cholodny, Myroslav Radysh, Mykhailo Chereshniovskyi, Petro Andrusiv, Ivan Kuchmak; Control Commission – Mykola Butovych, Demian Horniatkevych, Antin Maliutsa; Friendly Court – Iryna Shukhevych, Mykhailo Moroz, Mykhailo Kravchuk.

Professor Alexander Archipenko received an honorary membership in the Association's Board of Directors and Professors Vasyl Krychevskyi and Oleksa Hryshchenko received honorary memberships.

The "Association of Ukrainian Artists of New York and the Vicinity" became a department of the organization.

== Goals and objectives ==
- uniting Ukrainian artists in the United States
- highlighting the values of Ukrainian spirituality and mentality through artistic means, not only within Ukrainian society in exile, but also outside
- cultural and social care for the achievements that already exist
- art studios with Ukrainian teaching staff for young people
- creating collegial working studios for artists
- providing financial assistance to colleagues as much as possible (for this purpose, the Assistance Fund was established in 1954)

== Artistic activity ==
The association organizes annual collective exhibitions of Ukrainian artists and solo exhibitions, which have featured not only Ukrainian authors from the United States, but also Ukrainian artists from Argentina, Venezuela, France, and Canada. The exhibits included paintings, sculpture, graphics, and more.

In 1963, Petro Mehyk began publishing the art magazine Ukrainian Art Digest under the auspices of the organization's Philadelphia office, which was published annually until 1991. It included articles on the history of Ukrainian art, biographies of Ukrainian artists, reviews of exhibitions and art publications.

== Departments ==
The Association of Ukrainian Artists in America holds meetings and exhibitions in close cooperation with the Literary and Art Club:

- The LCA New York (149 2nd Ave., New York, N.Y.) was founded in November 1949. In 1955, sculptor Serhii Lytvynenko, one of the founders and at that time the Club's chairman, described the LCA's activities as follows: "The Club is still the only large organization that has united all artists of all branches of art, regardless of their political, religious, or artistic beliefs. It has become the environment where opposition to Ukrainian spiritual culture is formed and the threshold through which every newly arrived Ukrainian artist crosses into New York".
- The LCA Philadelphia (866 N. 7th St., Philadelphia, Pa). Subsequently, the Philadelphia branch was located in its own building at: 2322 Poplar Street, Philadelphia, PA 19130, USA.
- The LCA Detroit (12001 Lumjkin St., Detroit 12, Mich).

== See also ==
- Ukrainian Association of Visual Artists of Canada
- Ukrainian Association of Visual Artists of Munich
- Association of Independent Ukrainian Artists

== Bibliography ==
- Mysttsiv ukraintsiv v Amerytsi obiednannia / H. H. Stelmashchuk // Encyclopedia of Modern Ukraine [Online] / Eds. : I. М. Dziuba, A. I. Zhukovsky, M. H. Zhelezniak [et al.] ; National Academy of Sciences of Ukraine, Shevchenko Scientific Society. – Kyiv : The NASU institute of Encyclopedic Research, 2018.
