= Mykhailo Osinchuk =

Ukrainian painter-monumentalist, iconographer, graphic artist (1890–1969)

- Михайло Іванович Осінчук
- Born: 16 September 1890; Holoshyntsi (now Ternopil Raion, Ternopil Oblast, Ukraine)
- Died: 13 February 1969 (aged 78); New York City
- Education: Kraków Academy of Fine Arts, Jagiellonian University
- Occupations: Painter-monumentalist, iconographer, graphic artist

Mykhailo Osinchuk (Ukrainian: Михайло Іванович Осінчук; 16 September 1890 – 13 February 1969) was a Ukrainian painter-monumentalist, iconographer, graphic artist. Professor, member of the Shevchenko Scientific Society, Ukrainian art organizations. Brother of the public figure and doctor Roman Osinchuk.

== Biography ==
He was born on 16 September 1890 in the village of Holoshyntsi (now Ternopil Raion, Ternopil Oblast, Ukraine).

In 1910 he graduated from the Ternopil Ukrainian Gymnasium. In 1910–1914, he studied at the Kraków Academy of Fine Arts under Y. Pantakevych. He participated in student exhibitions, where he received medals and prizes. Simultaneously with his studies at the Academy, he deepened his knowledge at the Faculty of Philosophy of the Jagiellonian University.

With the outbreak of the World War I, he was forced to interrupt his studies. In 1917–1918 he continued his studies at the university. From November 1918, he served as a cartographer at the Secretariat of Internal Affairs of the ZUNR in Stanyslaviv (now Ivano-Frankivsk), and was in the ranks of the Ukrainian Galician Army (lieutenant) and the Ukrainian People's Army. In August 1920 he returned home and taught at Ukrainian gymnasiums in Drohobych and Rohatyn.

In 1922, he moved to Lviv and became actively involved in artistic life. In his work, he sought to continue the millennial tradition of Byzantine icons in Ukraine, which was interrupted by nineteenth-century realists. At the same time, he tried to avoid repeating and copying old models and create new forms of iconography based on traditional Ukrainian folk art. He spent some time in Greece, where he learned the technology of tempera painting, and traveled to Turkey, Italy, and France.

In collaboration with Pavlo Kovzhun, he created church polychromies in the Ukrainian Byzantine style in twelve churches in Galicia (in the villages of: Ozerna, Sokal, Zashkiv, Dolyna, Myklashiv, Nakonechne, Kalush, Stoianiv, Hrymailiv, and others). In these works, the artist managed to create a new, organically fresh Ukrainian decorative art. Mykhailo Osinchuk participated in the interior decoration of St. George's Cathedral in Lviv. He also designed ten iconostases.

He created illustrations for works by Ukrainian writers and bookplates. In particular, the bookplate to Anna Stefanovych book in 1933 won the prize of the Society of Ukrainian Writers and Journalists in Lviv. In 1935, he published two icons for a peasant's house (the Savior and the Mother of God). Together with his associates, Osinchuk co-founded the Association of Independent Ukrainian Artists and its printed organ, the magazine "Mystetstvo". In September 1939, he became a professor at the Lviv Art Institute.

=== Emigration ===
In 1944, fearing Stalin's terror, he emigrated to Germany. In the postwar years he lived in New York City. Here he participated in the activities of the Ukrainian Artist's Association in USA, which he founded. M. Osinchuk was elected honorary chairman of the association, he constantly participated in art exhibitions, was a member of many juries and the committee for the construction of the Taras Shevchenko Memorial in Washington. While in exile, he created 4 iconographic polychromies in the United States and 2 in Canada. Over time, he moved away from monumental art and devoted himself to easel painting, creating a series of new icons, portraits and historical compositions. In 1964, a solo exhibition was held in Philadelphia. In 1967, a monograph dedicated to his work entitled "Mykhailo Osinchuk – Painter-Artist" was published in New York.

Mykhailo Osinchuk died on 13 February 1969 in New York City, buried at the Ukrainian Orthodox Cemetery in South Bound Brook.

== Bibliography ==
- Osinchuk Mykhailo / H. H. Stelmashchuk // Encyclopedia of Modern Ukraine [Online] / Eds. : I. М. Dziuba, A. I. Zhukovsky, M. H. Zhelezniak [et al.] ; National Academy of Sciences of Ukraine, Shevchenko Scientific Society. – Kyiv : The NASU institute of Encyclopedic Research, 2022.
- (in Ukrainian) Дуда І., Мельничук Б., Пиндус Б., Осінчук Михайло Іванович // Ternopil Encyclopedic Dictionary: in 4 v. / editorial board: H. Yavorskyi and other, Ternopil: "Zbruch", 2008, V. 3: П—Я, S. 690. — ISBN 978-966-528-279-2.
- Михайло Осінчук (1890—1969)
- Михайло Осічнук: Мистець. Маляр. Нью-Йорк, 1967.
