= Yaroslava Muzyka =

Ukrainian painter, restorer, and public figure (1894–1973)

- Ярослава Львівна Музика
- Born: 10 January 1894; Zaliztsi, Austria-Hungary (nov Ukraine)
- Died: 23 November 1973 (aged 79); Lviv
- Education: Free Academy of Arts in Lviv
- Occupations: Painter, restorer, and public figure

Yaroslava Muzyka, née Stefanovych (Ukrainian: Ярослава Львівна Музика; 10 January 1894 – 23 November 1973) was a Ukrainian painter, restorer, and public figure. She was a member of the Union of Artists of Ukraine (1940) and co-founder and chairman (1931) of the Association of Independent Ukrainian Artists in Lviv. In 1934, she co-organized the Ukrainian Women's Congress in Stanyslaviv.

== Biography ==
She was born in 1894 in the Zaliztsi, now in the Ternopil Raion of the Ternopil Oblast, in the family of a local judge's adviser. Her great-grandfather was Hryhorii Savchynskyi.

As a teenager, she moved to Lviv. In 1917–1919 she studied at the Stanisław Kaczor-Batowski Art Studio in Lviv.

In 1920–1923, she studied at the Faculty of Plastics of the Free Academy of Arts in Lviv. The artist was attracted to the world of folklore images, household items, and folk costumes.

In 1935, he studied at the Free Academy in Paris. Upon returning home, she became a part of the artistic life of Lviv. She became a member of the Association of Independent Ukrainian Artists, which organized numerous exhibitions and published the magazine "Mystetstvo" until 1939. In addition to participating in public life, the artist worked fruitfully in the field of graphics, painted portraits of her contemporaries, created mosaic compositions, and passionately collected masterpieces of Ukrainian folk art.

She worked in the restoration workshop of the National Museum in Lviv. Co-founder and chairman (1931) of the Association of Independent Ukrainian Artists in Lviv; participated in all its exhibitions. In 1934, she co-organized the Ukrainian Women's Congress in Stanyslaviv (now Ivano-Frankivsk).

After the annexation of western Ukrainian lands to the Ukrainian SSR in 1939, she made great efforts to organize exhibitions in Kyiv, Kharkiv, and Lviv.

Her husband, the deputy director of the medical institute, Maksym Muzyka, was forced to urgently evacuate with the students to Central Asia, and she was left alone in the occupied city, earning a living from occasional jobs.

After the war, Yaroslava Muzyka continued to work creatively, participating in exhibitions organized in Kyiv and Lviv. However, on 8 November 1948, during a creative business trip to the Crimea, the artist was arrested and escorted to Kyiv. Here, in a special Ministry of State Security camp, she was accused of having ties to the leaders of Bandera's Organization of Ukrainian Nationalists Central Committee, collaborating with them, and providing material assistance to the underground. After brutal interrogations, the artist was forced to admit to all the charges against her. By the decision of the Special Council of the NKVD of the USSR Ministry of State Security of 18 June 1949, Yaroslava Muzyka was sentenced to 25 years in a prison camp for "active participation in an anti-Soviet gang of Ukrainian nationalists" with a stay in a special camp No. 7 near the city of Bratsk.

After Stalin's death, thanks to numerous petitions, she was released on 6 June 1955. Upon returning to Lviv, the artist, who was suffering from tuberculosis, began to participate in the creative life of her native city. In 1957 and 1964, her works were exhibited with great success at the artist's personal exhibitions.

Yaroslava Muzyka died on 23 November 1973. She was buried at the Lychakiv Cemetery in Lviv, in the Savchynskyi family grave, field 13. A bronze portrait bas-relief by Yevhen Dzyndra is installed on the tomb.

== Creative heritage ==
She worked in various types and genres of fine and decorative and applied arts: painting (iconography, portrait, landscape, still life), mosaics, painting on glass, easel and illustrative graphics (linocuts, etchings), bookplates, enamel, batik, leather stamping, inlay, carpet weaving, applications – more than 2000 works.

She bequeathed her works, archive, library, and collection to the Lviv Art Gallery.

=== Paintings ===
- "Old Man with a Beard" (1923)
- "Princess Olga" (1925, 1967)
- "Hutsul with a Pipe" (1928)
- "Female Portrait" (1933)
- "Kremenets Legend" (1971)

=== Portraits ===
- M. Rudnytskyi (1963)
- M. Fediuk (1964)

=== Graphic series ===
- "Shevchenko's" (1961–1964)
- "Animals" (1932–1965)
- "Przemyśl Legend" (1966)
- "Symbols of Skovoroda" (1969)

=== Other works ===
- Woodcut "Horses" (1932)
- Mosaic "Dovbush's Meeting with Dzvonka" (1962)
- Composition on Glass "Anna Yaroslavna" (1967)
- Composition on Enamel "Folk Beliefs" (1965–1966)
- Appliqués "Bohdan Khmelnytsky's Entry into Kyiv" (1968)

== Commemorating ==
In 1994, a bronze plaque with a high relief image was installed on the facade of the house at 26 Vynnychenko Street in Lviv, where Yaroslava Muzyka lived from 1909 to 1973. Sculptor Emmanuel Mysko, architect Vasyl Kamenshchyk.

In 2000, in order to preserve, revive and further develop the artistic traditions of the Ternopil Oblast, to encourage amateur artists to work fruitfully for the development of Ukrainian national art, the Yaroslava Muzyka Prize was founded in Ternopil.

== Bibliography ==
- Muzyka Yaroslava Lvivna / B. M. Filts // Encyclopedia of Modern Ukraine [Online] / Eds. : I. М. Dziuba, A. I. Zhukovsky, M. H. Zhelezniak [et al.] ; National Academy of Sciences of Ukraine, Shevchenko Scientific Society. – Kyiv : The NASU institute of Encyclopedic Research, 2020.
- (in Ukrainian) Дуда І., Стецько В., Музика Ярослава Львівна // Ternopil Encyclopedic Dictionary: in 4 v. / editorial board: H. Yavorskyi and other, Ternopil: "Zbruch", 2005, V. 2: К—О, S. 575. — ISBN 966-528-199-2.
- Фільц Б. М. Музика Ярослава Львівна // Енциклопедія історії України : у 10 т. / редкол.: В. А. Смолій (голова) та ін. ; Інститут історії України НАН України. — К. : Наукова думка, 2010. — Т. 7 : Мл — О. — С. 121. — ISBN 978-966-00-1061-1.
- Музика Ярослава Львівна // Шевченківська енциклопедія: — Т.4:М—Па : у 6 т. / Гол. ред. М. Г. Жулинський. — Київ : Ін-т літератури ім. Т. Г. Шевченка, 2013. — С. 356-357.
