= Mykola Holubets =

Ukrainian historian (1891–1942)

- Микола Голубець
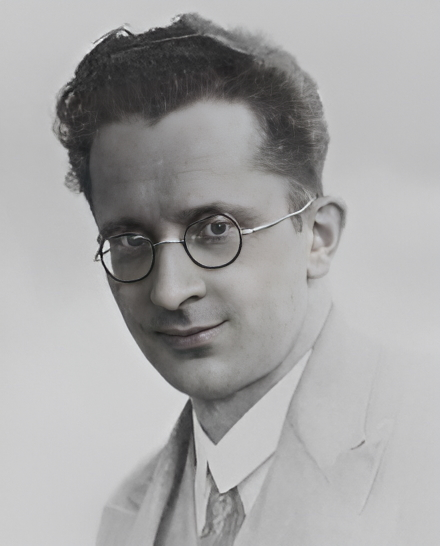
- Born: 15 December 1891; Lviv
- Died: 22 May 1942 (aged 50); Lviv
- Other names: M. Vilshana, Mykola Vikonskyi, Humenetskyi, Liubinetskyi, Milo, M. H.
- Education: Kraków Academy of Arts, University of Lviv, University of Vienna
- Occupation: Historian

Mykola Holubets (Ukrainian: Микола Голубець; 15 December 1891 – 22 May 1942) was a Ukrainian historian, archivist, local historian, art historian, poet, prose writer, publicist, editor, translator, and bibliographer.

== Biography ==
He was born on 15 December 1891 in Lviv. He was the illegitimate child of the priest Bohdan Eliashevskyi, the parish priest of the village of Zashkiv (Lviv Oblast), and Mariia Holubets, who was a servant in his house.

He graduated from the Lviv Academic Gymnasium and the Kraków Academy of Arts. He studied at the Faculty of Philosophy at the University of Lviv and at the University of Vienna.

During the World War I, from 1914, he volunteered for the Legion of Ukrainian Sich Riflemen. He held the rank of cadet and was an active member of the Press Apartment in Vienna. At the end of 1918, he was the commander of the fourth division of the newly created Ukrainian Galician Army, a participant in the fighting of the Polish–Ukrainian War of 1918-1919.

From the 1920s, he was engaged in scientific, literary, and cultural activities: a member of the Shevchenko Scientific Society in Lviv's commission on the history of art, one of the organizers of the Association of Independent Ukrainian Artists.

In the 1930s, he lived at 33 Pasichna Street; in 1991, a neighboring street connecting Pasichna Street with the former village of Hory was named after him.

After September 1939, he worked at the Lviv City Archives.

During the Nazi occupation of Lviv, he founded the Literary and Art Club and worked on a three-volume history of Ukrainian culture.

Holubets died in 1942; he was buried at Lychakiv Cemetery.

== Journalistic work ==
As a researcher of the history of Ukrainian art and the history of Ukraine, Lviv, and the region, he was the author of 84 books and brochures, and over 1500 articles. He also published a series of brochures and articles about Ukrainian artists including Oleksandr Arkhypenko (1922), Taras Shevchenko (1924), Luka Dolynskyi (1924), Petro Kholodnyi (1926), Mykhailo Havrylko, Lev Gets (1934), Teofil Kopystynskyi, Olena Kulchytska, Yurii Narbut, Oleksa Novakivskyi, Ivan Trush, and Pavlo Kovzhun (1939). During the 1920s he worked Worked closely with archaeologist, archivist and art historian Bohdan Yanush.

He also wrote guides to cities and villages including Lviv (guidebook, 1925), Lavriv (1926-1927), Belz, Buzke, Zvenyhorod (1927), Przemyśl, Terebovlia (1928), Sokal (1929), Zhovkva and medieval Halych (1937).

He was the publisher and editor of 14 weekly and daily newspapers, including "Svit" (1917—1918), "Zhyttia i mystetstvo" (1920), "Kholodnyi" (1926), "Ukrainske mystetstvo" and "Nedilia" (1928—1931).

He also edited the "Ukrainian Biblioteka", published by Ivan Tyktor.

== Poet and a prose writer ==
He began his artistic career as a poet with collections of poems marked by minor moods, "Fragmenty" (1909) and "Buvaiut Khvyli" (1910). He is the author of the biblical epic poem "Moisei Bezumnyi" ("Moses the Mad", 1914). In the poems "Apostrofa," "Mykhailovi Yatskovu", and others, the poetic cycle "Vesnyani Vody," and the dramatic scene "Stricha" from the collection "Poeziyi", motifs of defiance against a difficult fate and the desire for social and spiritual harmony prevail.

Known for his prose works: the novella "Liudy i Blazni" (1927), sketches "Hei, Vydno Selo" (1934), and historical novels "Zhovti Vody" (1937) and "Plemia Chingiskkhana" (1938). He translated individual works by Gerhart Hauptmann ("The Sunken Bell"), Henrik Ibsen ("Peer Gynt", translated by Holubets as "Per Hint", 1921), Johann Wolfgang von Goethe (an excerpt from the fifth act of "Faust", 1937), Oscar Wilde, and others (unpublished). His renditions of Heinrich Heine's works were published in periodicals.

== Main works ==
- Українське мистецтво: Вступ до історії (Ukrainian Art: an introduction to History). — Львів, 1918.
- Причинки до історії галицького українського мистецтва. — Т. 1. — Львів, 1920.
- Начерк історії українського мистецтва. — Ч. 1. — Львів, 1922.
- Шевченко — маляр. — Львів, 1924.
- Галицьке мистецтво, Львів, 1926.
- Український килим. — Львів, 1927.
- За український Львів: Епізоди боротьби XII—XIII вв. — Львів, 1927.
- Белз, Буськ, Звенигород. — Львів, 1927. — 32 с.
- Люди і блазні. — Львів, 1928.
- Слідами Хмельницького у Львові. — Львів, 1928.
- Перемишль. — Львів, 1928
- Полум'яний 1848 рік: Картини й епізоди. — Львів, 1929.
- Вчорашня легенда [про визвольні змагання]. — Львів, 1933.
- Гей, видно село… [про перші бої УСС]. — Львів, 1934.
- Велика історія України (Great History of the Ukraine). Львів, 1935.
- Історія української культури (розділ «Мистецтво»). — Львів, 1937.
- Жовті Води: Історичний роман. — Львів, 1937; перевидано 1997.
- Плем'я Чингізхана: Хроніка XII в. — Львів, 1938.
- Голубець М. Павло Ковжун / Микола Голубець. — Львів: б. в., 1939. — 31 с.

== Family ==
Mykola Holubets was the first husband of Mariia Bachynska-Dontsova (sister of Lesia Bachynska), who, after his death, married Samiilo Pidhirskyi. Lesia was shot by the Gestapo for her connection with the Ukrainian Insurgent Army, and subsequently, their daughter with Mykola, Nana, and her husband were also killed. Natalia Yakhnenko describes this in her memoirs: "God granted that no one from our family perished upon the return of the Bolsheviks. It was different for Samiilo Pidhirskyi's family: in the last weeks in our city, his wife Lesia, Mrs. Dontsova's sister, was shot by the Gestapo for her connection with the UPA, and then her daughter Nana from her first marriage to M. Holubets, and her husband".

Mykola Holubets is the father of Zenon Holubets, a sculptor and painter from Lviv.

== Bibliography ==
- Енциклопедія українознавства : Словникова частина : [в 11 т.] / Наукове товариство імені Шевченка ; гол. ред. проф., д-р Володимир Кубійович. — Париж — Нью-Йорк : Молоде життя, 1955—1995. — ISBN 5-7707-4049-3. — Т. 2. — С. 408.
- Holubets Mykola / V. M. Khanko // Encyclopedia of Modern Ukraine [Online] / Eds. : I. М. Dziuba, A. I. Zhukovsky, M. H. Zhelezniak [et al.] ; National Academy of Sciences of Ukraine, Shevchenko Scientific Society. – Kyiv : The NASU institute of Encyclopedic Research, 2006.
- Микола Голубець. Український килим. Львів, 1936.
- Мороз Л. З. Голубець Микола // Українська літературна енциклопедія : В 5 т. / редкол.: І. О. Дзеверін (відповід. ред.) та ін. — К. : Голов. ред. УРЕ ім. М. П. Бажана, 1988. — Т. 1 : А—Г. — С. 448.
- Голубець Микола // Мистецтво України : Біографічний довідник. / упоряд.: А. В. Кудрицький, М. Г. Лабінський ; за ред. А. В. Кудрицького. — Київ : «Українська енциклопедія» імені М. П. Бажана, 1997. — С. 162—163 . — ISBN 5-88500-071-9.
- Сварник І. Голубець Микола // Довідник з історії України. — 2-ге вид. — К., 2001. — С. 169.
- Герасимова Г. П. Голубець Микола // Енциклопедія історії України : у 10 т. / редкол.: В. А. Смолій (голова) та ін. ; Інститут історії України НАН України. — К. : Наукова думка, 2004. — Т. 2 : Г — Д. — С. 148—149. — ISBN 966-00-0405-2.
- Бутрин М. Голубець Микола // Українська журналістика в іменах. — Випуск 2. — Львів, 1995.
- Головацький І. Дещо про Миколу Голубця // Літопис Червоної Калини. — 1998. — Т. 9.
- Matelski D. Anatomia grabieży. Polityka Rosji wobec polskiego dziedzictwa kultury od XVII do XXI wieku [Анатомія грабунку. Політика Росії щодо польської культурної спадщини з 17 по 21 століття]. — Kraków : Avalon, 2021. — S. 287.
