= Association of Independent Ukrainian Artists =

The Association of Independent Ukrainian Artists (Ukrainian: Асоціація незалежних українських митців), also known as AIUA, was an artistic organization that functioned in Lviv in 1931–1939. It was founded in 1931 by a group of Ukrainian painters: Sviatoslav Hordynskyi, Pavlo Kovzhun, Yaroslava Muzyka, and others. The association's activities were based on the principles formulated by the members of the AIUA's predecessor, the Circle of Ukrainian Art Workers (CUAW), which existed in Lviv in 1922–1926. In the short time of its existence, the association achieved tangible results in presenting Ukrainian culture and its best representatives to the world.

== Activities of the association ==
=== Objectives of the association ===
The main tasks of the AIUA were to consolidate Ukrainian artists abroad and in Galicia, to develop Ukrainian art on the principles and traditions of the European art process of the time (the first third of the 20th century), that is, to bring traditional Ukrainian art to the world level of the time. The main means of promoting Ukrainian art and its leading representatives from around the world were exhibitions and publishing. The AIUA actively cooperated with a number of Ukrainian art centers in Europe.

=== Management and members of the association ===
Association management:

- Yaroslava Muzyka, President
- Pavlo Kovzhun, Secretary
- Mykhailo Osinchuk, Treasurer
- Sviatoslav Hordynskyi

Members of the Association:

- Mykhailo Andriienko (Paris)
- Mykola Butovych (Prague)
- Lev Gets (Sanok-Peremyshl)
- Mykola Hlushchenko (Paris)
- Mariia Sofiia Dolnytska (Vienna)
- Mykhailo Dragan (Lviv)
- Fedir Yemets (Berlin)
- Margit Sielska-Reich (Lviv)
- Roman Selskyi (Lviv)
- Volodymyr Sichynskyi (Lviv-Prague)
- Vasyl Perebyinis (Paris)

=== Exhibition activities ===
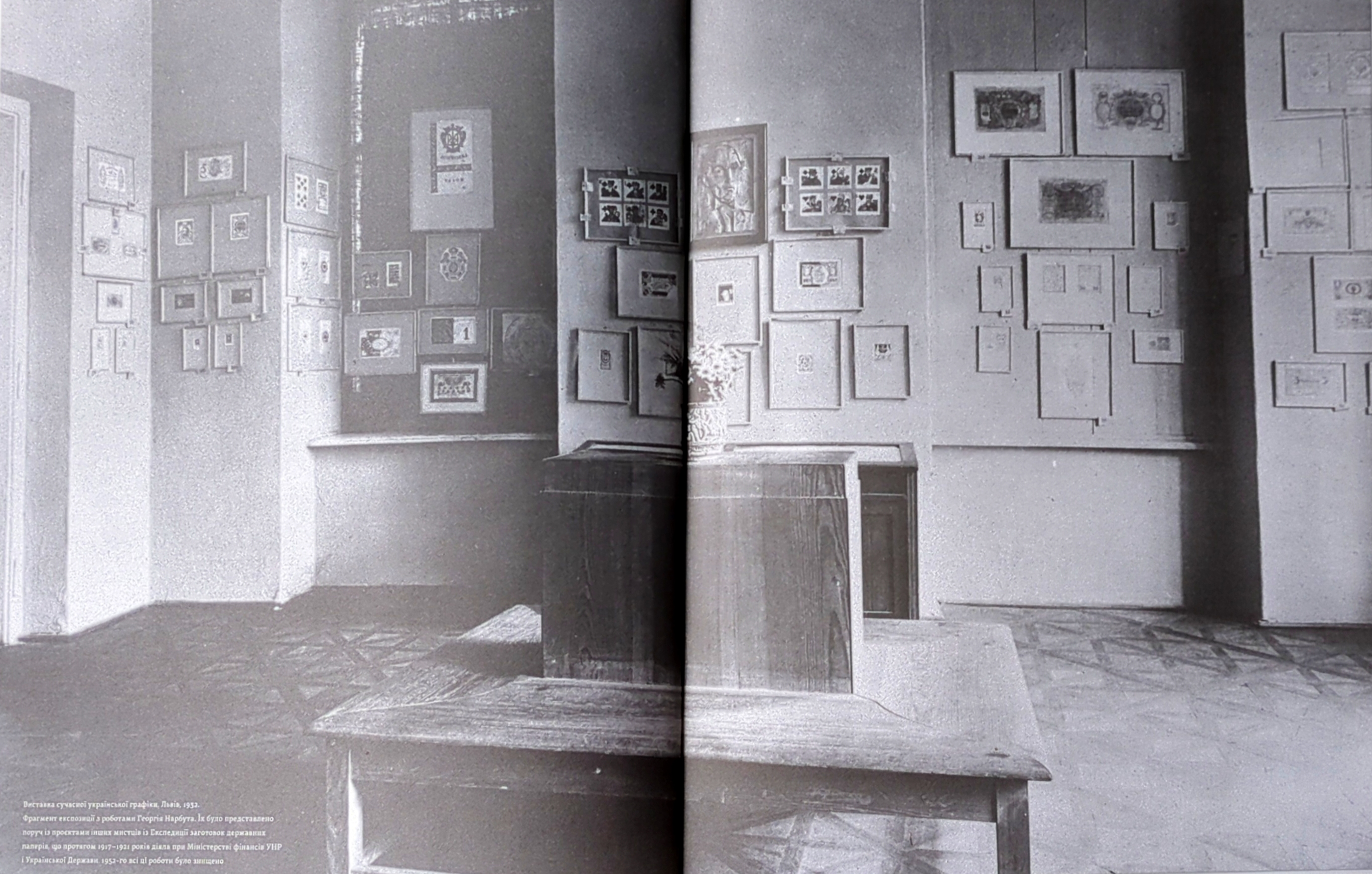
In June 1932, young artists from the AIUA, including Pavlo Kovzhun, organized an exhibition in Lviv called "Modern Ukrainian Graphics", which featured 327 drawings, including one titled "Narbut and the Expedition to Procure Ukrainian Government Papers".

During the 9 years of its existence, the AIUA held 14 exhibitions with a wide geography of participants, each of which exhibited works by Ukrainian artists from the United States (Alexander Archipenko) and Europe – United Kingdom (Warsaw), Anatolii Petrytskyi (Kyiv), Ivan Padalka (Kharkiv), Yaroslav Lukavetskyi (Prague), and others. Related Ukrainian art centers in Europe also took an active part in the exhibitions: the Ukrainian "Paris Group", the Kraków "Zarevo", the Warsaw art group "Spokii" (Calm), the Prague "Studio of Plastic Art", as well as artists from Naddniprianshchyna, Germany, and Austria. The exhibitions featured not only works by members of the AIUA, but also by other well-known Ukrainian and European artists, including those from Italy, France, and Germany (Mario Tozzi, Gino Severini, Pablo Picasso).

The association also organized a number of solo exhibitions of Ukrainian artists (Lev Gets, Olena Kulchytska, Mykola Hlushchenko, Oleksa Hryshchenko, and Volodymyr Lasovskyi).

=== Publishing activities ===
One of the most important achievements of the AIUA was the organization of the publishing of the first ever art publications in the Ukrainian language. In addition to 11 detailed exhibition catalogs, the association published seven monographs on Ukrainian artists (M. Andrienko, L. Gets, M. Hlushchenko, O. Hryshchenko, O. Kulchytska, O. Sakhnovska, and others) at the expense of membership fees.

A special role in the development of Ukrainian art and art criticism was played by the journal "Mystetstvo" published by the association in 1932-1936. A group of talented critics and art historians (S. Hordynskyi, M. Holubets, P. Kovzhun, M. Dragan, V. Sichynskyi, and others) formed around this publication and became the driving force behind the association's development.

== See also ==
- Ukrainian Artist's Association in USA
- Ukrainian Association of Visual Artists of Canada
- Ukrainian Association of Visual Artists of Munich

== Bibliography ==
- Asotsiatsiia nezalezhnykh ukrainskykh mysttsiv / I. V. Holod // Encyclopedia of Modern Ukraine [Online] / Eds. : I. М. Dziuba, A. I. Zhukovsky, M. H. Zhelezniak [et al.] ; National Academy of Sciences of Ukraine, Shevchenko Scientific Society. – Kyiv : The NASU institute of Encyclopedic Research, 2001.
- Ткачова Л. І. Асоціація незалежних українських митців // Енциклопедія історії України: Т. 1: А-В / Редкол.: В. А. Смолій (голова) та ін. НАН України. Інститут історії України. — К.: В-во «Наукова думка», 2003. — 688 с.: іл.
- Енциклопедія Львова, т. 1 (За редакцією А. Козицького та І. Підкови) — Львів, «Літопис», 2007—656 с. ISBN 966-7007-67-1, ISBN 966-7007-68-8 (Т. 1).
