= Iryna Shukhevych =

Ukrainian artist and iconographer (1885–1979)

- Ірина Федорівна Шухевич
- Born: 21 November 1885; Vyshniv, Austria-Hungary (now Ukraine)
- Died: 17 February 1979 (aged 93); Stamford, Connecticut
- Occupations: Artist and iconographer

Iryna Shukhevych (Ukrainian: Ірина Федорівна Шухевич; née Velychkivska; 21 November 1885 – 17 February 1979) was a Ukrainian artist and iconographer; member of the "Zarevo" art organization in Kraków, the Ukrainian Union of Fine Arts in Lviv, the Ukrainian Women's Union, the Ukrainian National Women's League of America, and the Ukrainian Artist's Association in USA.

== Biography ==
She was born on 21 November 1885 in the village of Vyshniv (now Ivano-Frankivsk Raion, Ivano-Frankivsk Oblast, Ukraine). She received her artistic education at the Stanisław Kaczor-Batowski School in Lviv and in 1911–1912 at the Maria Niedzielska School of Fine Arts for Women[pl] in Kraków, where she was taught by professors of the Kraków Academy of Arts. She received a scholarship for her studies from Metropolitan Andrei Sheptytskyi.

She often stayed in the of Dolyna, where her father, Teodor Velychkovskyi, was a priest. There she married Pavlo Shukhevych and moved to Chernivtsi, where the family lived in a house at 12A Yelyzaveta Square. In the following years, the couple moved frequently, living for some time in Kolomyia, then in the south of Poland, in Kraków; during World War II, they lived in Munich.

In 1949, she emigrated to the United States and settled in New York City. She died in Stamford on 17 February 1979. She is buried at the Ukrainian Holy Spirit Cemetery in Hamptonburg.

== Creative work ==
She worked in easel and monumental painting, iconography. After completing her art education, together with her cousin, the artist Modest Sosenko, and later on her own, she painted churches in Galicia (in Bilche-Zolote, Podillia, Pechenizhyn, Koniushky, and other settlements).

She worked in various genres of painting, showed herself in the animalistic genre ("In the Stables", "Calf"), and created portraits, landscapes, and paintings on religious themes. She painted in realistic and impressionistic styles.

Her icons are in the churches of Galicia, Bukovyna, Rome, and the United States of America (Brooklyn, Rochester, Utica).

She participated in exhibitions since the 1920s in Lviv and Kraków; in 1947 in Munich, at the Bavarian National Museum; in the United States of America – exhibitions of the Association of Ukrainian Artists in America and exhibitions organized by the Ukrainian Women's Union of America.

== Honoring ==
In Ivano-Frankivsk, there is a Shukhevych Street named after not only Iryna, but her entire family.

== Bibliography ==
- Шухевич Ірина // Енциклопедія українознавства : Словникова частина : [в 11 т.] / Наукове товариство імені Шевченка ; гол. ред. проф., д-р Володимир Кубійович. — Париж — Нью-Йорк : Молоде життя, 1984. — Кн. 2, [т. 10] : Хмельницький Борис — Яцків. — ISBN 5-7707-4049-3.;
- Г. Г. Стельмащук. Шухевич Ірина // Українські митці у світі. Матеріали до історії українського мистецтва XX ст.. — Львівська національна академія мистецтв (Науково-дослідний сектор). — Львів : Апріорі, 2013. — С. 506—507. — ISBN 978-617-629-152-7.
