= Horodyni =

Rural locality in Volyn Oblast, Ukraine

Horodyni Городині
- Location in Volyn Oblast Horodyni (Ukraine)
- Coordinates: 50°50′41″N 25°2′13″E
- Country: Ukraine
- Oblast: Volyn Oblast
- Raion: Lutsk Raion
- Hromada: Torchyn settlement hromada
- Time zone: UTC+2 (EET)
  - Summer (DST): UTC+3 (EEST)
- Postal code: 45152

Horodyni (Ukrainian: Городині) is a village in the Torchyn settlement hromada of the Lutsk Raion of Volyn Oblast in Ukraine.

== History ==
In 1906, the village was part of the Shchuryn volost of Lutsk county, in the Volyn Governorate. The distance from the county town was 24 versts, and 15 from the volost. There were 46 households and 393 inhabitants.

On 19 July 2020, as a result of the administrative-territorial reform and liquidation of the Rozhyshche Raion, the village became part of the Lutsk Raion.

== Notable residents ==
- Halyna Stelmashchuk (born 1943), Ukrainian scholar specializing in the history and theory of decorative and applied arts, art criticism, and ethnology
