= Plikhiv =

Rural locality in Ternopil Oblast, Ukraine

Plikhiv Пліхів
- Location in Ternopil Oblast
- Coordinates: 49°35′39″N 24°56′40″E
- Country: Ukraine
- Oblast: Ternopil Oblast
- Raion: Ternopil Raion
- Hromada: Berezhany urban hromada
- Time zone: UTC+2 (EET)
  - Summer (DST): UTC+3 (EEST)
- Postal code: 47510

Plikhiv (Ukrainian: Пліхів) is a village in Berezhany urban hromada, Ternopil Raion, Ternopil Oblast, Ukraine.

== History ==
The first written mention of the village was in 1443.

After the liquidation of the Berezhany Raion on 19 July 2020, the village became part of the Ternopil Raion.

== Religion ==
- Church of the Exaltation of the Holy Cross (1742, wooden).

== Notable residents ==
- Mykhailo Moroz (1904–1992), Ukrainian painter.

== Sources ==
- (in Ukrainian) Жак О., Тиманський С., Пліхів // Ternopil Encyclopedic Dictionary: in 4 v. / editorial board: H. Yavorskyi and other, Ternopil: "Zbruch", 2008, V. 3: П—Я, S. 97. — ISBN 978-966-528-279-2.
- "Plichów z Wolicą". Geographical Dictionary of the Kingdom of Poland (in Polish). 8. Warszawa: Kasa im. Józefa Mianowskiego. 1887. p. 262—263.
