= Holoshyntsi =

Rural locality in Ternopil Oblast, Ukraine

Holoshyntsi Голошинці
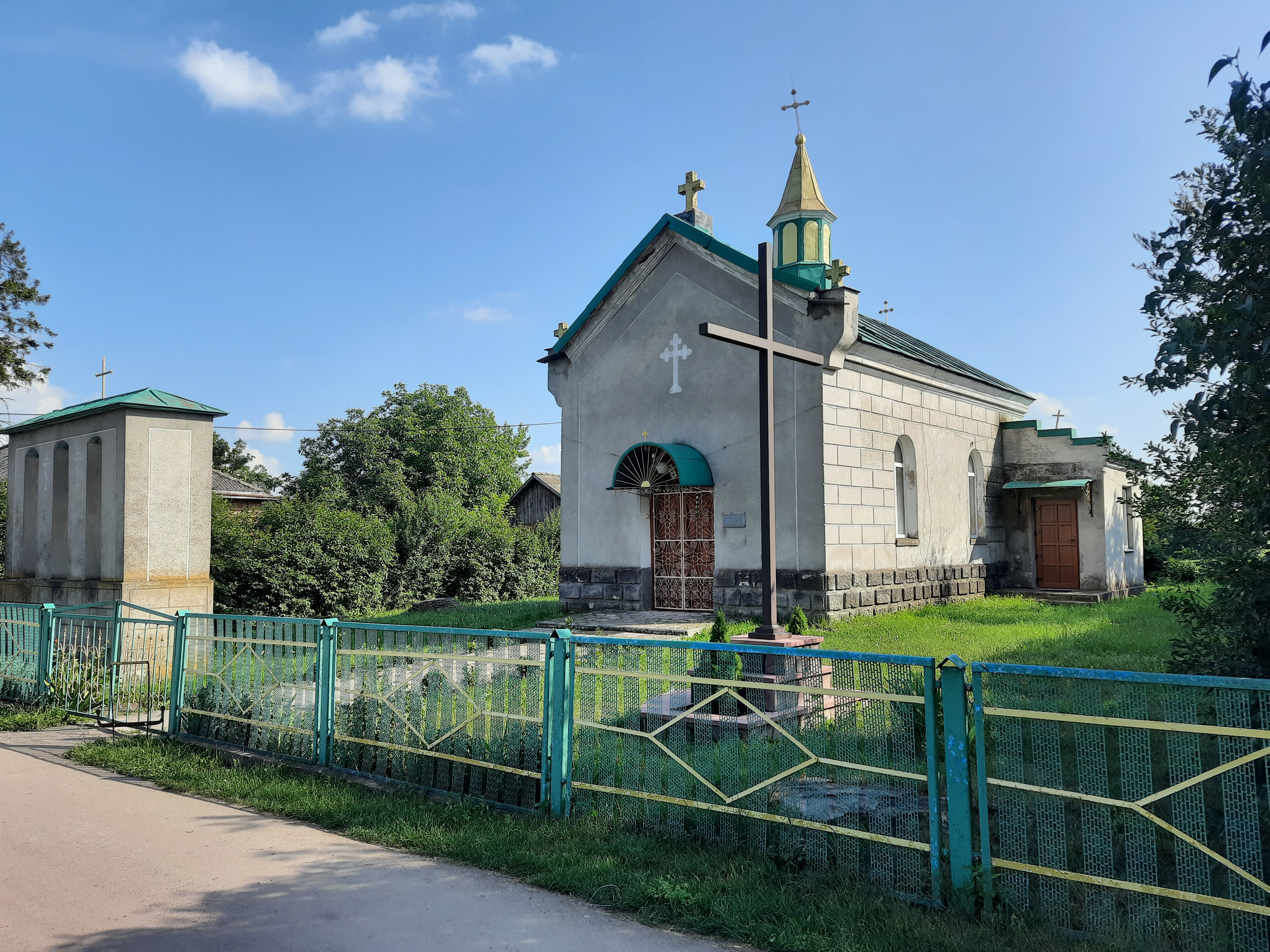
- Church of the Nativity of the Blessed Virgin Mary. Holoshyntsi village Ternopil district, Ternopil region

- Location in Ternopil Oblast
- Coordinates: 49°37′51″N 26°5′49″E
- Country: Ukraine
- Oblast: Ternopil Oblast
- Raion: Ternopil Raion
- Hromada: Skoryky rural hromada
- Time zone: UTC+2 (EET)
  - Summer (DST): UTC+3 (EEST)
- Postal code: 47817

Holoshyntsi (Ukrainian: Голошинці) is a village in Skoryky rural hromada, Ternopil Raion, Ternopil Oblast, Ukraine.

== History ==
The first written mention of the village was in 1402.

After the liquidation of the Pidvolochysk Raion on 19 July 2020, the village became part of the Ternopil Raion.

== Religion ==
- Church-Chapel of the Nativity of the Blessed Virgin Mary (1893, rebuilt from a Roman Catholic church in the early 1990s).

== Notable residents ==
- Mykhailo Osinchuk (1890–1969), Ukrainian painter-monumentalist, iconographer, graphic artist

== Sources ==
- (in Ukrainian) Уніят В., Голошинці // Ternopil Encyclopedic Dictionary: in 4 v. / editorial board: H. Yavorskyi and other, Ternopil: "Zbruch", 2004, V. 1: А—Й, S. 386. — ISBN 966-528-197-6.
- "Hołoszyńce". Geographical Dictionary of the Kingdom of Poland (in Polish). 3. Warszawa: Kasa im. Józefa Mianowskiego. 1882. p. 107.
