= Petro Fedun =

Ukrainian revolutionary (1919–1951)

- Петро Федун
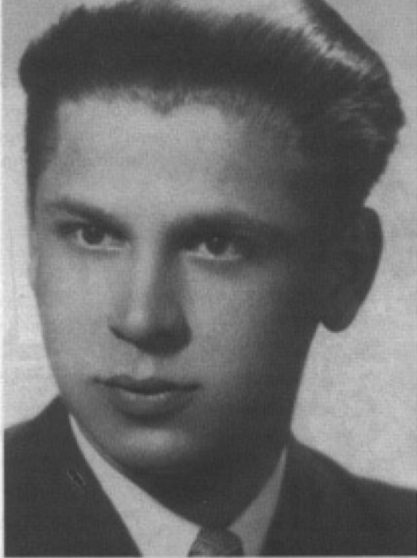
- Fedun in the 1940s
- Born: 23 February 1919; Shnyriv, Ukraine
- Died: 23 December 1951 (aged 32); Vyshniv, Ukrainian SSR, Soviet Union (now Ukraine)
- Cause of death: Suicide by gunshot
- Other name: Petro Poltava
- Known for: Social democracy
- Political party: Organisation of Ukrainian Nationalists
- Military career
- Allegiance: Soviet Union; Ukrainian Insurgent Army
- Branch: Red Army; Ukrainian Insurgent Army
- Service years: 1940–1941; 1944–1951
- Rank: Unclear officer rank (RKKA); Colonel (UPA)
- Conflicts: World War II; Winter War (possibly; see § Soviet occupation and Red Army career); Operation Barbarossa (POW); Anti-Soviet resistance by the Ukrainian Insurgent Army †

Petro Mykolaiovych Fedun (Ukrainian: Петро Миколайович Федун; 23 February 1919 – 23 December 1951), also known by the literary pseudonym of Petro Poltava (Ukrainian: Петро Полтава), was a Ukrainian revolutionary writer, journalist, and politician. Ideologically a Ukrainian nationalist and social democrat, he was one of the leaders of the reformist faction of the Organisation of Ukrainian Nationalists' Banderite wing from 1945 until his 1951 death in battle against officers of the Soviet Ministry of State Security.

Born in rural Galicia, Fedun joined the OUN as a teenager. He was conscripted into the Red Army following the Soviet annexation of Eastern Galicia and Volhynia, and captured during Operation Barbarossa. After being released, Fedun soon returned to the OUN (now split between anti-Nazi and collaborationist wings), and was involved in the group's anti-Nazi underground in the cities of Lviv and Brody. After the German defeat in Galicia, Fedun rapidly rose through the ranks of the OUN, being appointed director of the Main Propaganda Cell in 1946. With the beginning of the Ukrainian Insurgent Army's anti-Soviet insurgency, Fedun became an ideologue for reformist OUN members opposed to the leadership of Stepan Bandera, writing influential works on social democracy and democratic socialism. He became the leader of the reformists in December 1951, but was killed the same month.

== Early life and activities ==
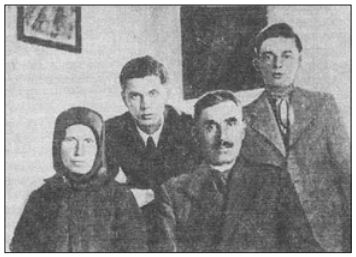
Petro Fedun (left, back row) with his brother and parents, 1930

Petro Mykolaiovych Fedun was born on 23 February 1919, in the Galician village of Shnyriv, the middle child between elder sister Hanna and younger brother Vasyl. His parents, Mykola and Paraskova, were both peasants. At the time, the village was under the rule of the Ukrainian People's Republic. It would later become part of the Second Polish Republic after the Polish–Soviet War via the 1921 Treaty of Riga.

Fedun began studying at the gymnasium in Brody in 1931. There, his belief in Ukrainian nationalism began to form under the influence of his teacher, Father Mykhailo Osadtsa. Father Mykhailo taught students about several Ukrainian celebrations, such as the Shevchenko Days, memorialisations of the 1918 Battle of Kruty, and celebrations of writer Markiian Shashkevych, among others. Fedun may also have undertook a military education while studying in gymnasium, as military training was mandatory for able-bodied students at the gymnasium, but such a thing is unconfirmed.

Fedun joined the youth branch of the Organisation of Ukrainian Nationalists in 1936, alongside fellow Shnyriv natives Bohdan Panasiuk and Wasyl Jaszczun. The three later returned to their home village as educators on behalf of the OUN. Fedun passed his matura in 1937, and he studied at a lyceum for two years before travelling to Lviv in the summer of 1939 to join the medical faculty of the University of Lviv. At this time, he moved to 1 Hlyboka Street, which would remain his home for the remainder of his life.

== Soviet occupation and Red Army career ==
Following the Soviet annexation of Eastern Galicia and Volhynia, Fedun was forced to leave university after being conscripted into the Red Army. Fedun's Red Army service remains a matter of ongoing debate in Ukrainian historiography, particularly regarding his role in the Winter War. According to one claim, Fedun briefly took part in the war, but historian Mykhailo Romaniuk has disputed this, noting that the war ended on 13 March 1940, at a time when Fedun was still listed as a student at the University of Lviv. According to Romaniuk, citing the recollections of an individual named Ya. Roshkovych, Fedun instead served in the city of Pavlohrad, in southern Ukraine.

At the beginning of Operation Barbarossa, Fedun held an officer rank in the Red Army. In the summer that marked the offensive's beginning, he was captured by Nazi Germany and placed in a prisoner-of-war camp. He remained imprisoned until being released prior to October 1941. Two different versions exist as to the cause of his release, with one stating that his parents spent money to ensure his release and another stating that he was allowed to walk free due to his fluency in German.

== German occupation ==
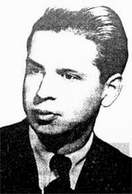
Fedun while studying at the University of Lviv

Upon his release from prison, Fedun first returned to Lviv before later travelling to Shnyriv. From October 1941 until the spring of 1942, he worked in the offices of the Brody County government. At this time, he re-established connections with the OUN. By this time, the group had split into two wings; one led by Stepan Bandera and one led by Andriy Melnyk. Fedun chose to join Bandera's wing of the OUN, establishing contacts within the underground.

After joining the OUN-B (Banderite) underground, Fedun became head of the OUN Youth in western Ukraine. He also became the leader of the Union of the Ukrainian Nationalist Studentry, and from 1943 to 1944 edited the OUN Youth's journal, Yunak, under the pseudonym of "Vol.". Later, he also joined the activities of the Bandera-aligned Ukrainian Insurgent Army (UPA), becoming head of the political education directorate of the Western Operational Group in March 1944. He also became part of the propaganda office of the OUN-B in Galicia the same month.

Fedun's rise within the OUN-B and UPA ranks continued throughout 1944. He began working as editor of three different propaganda journals, and travelled into the Carpathian Mountains to train young members of the OUN in ideology. He additionally became a member of the Main Military Staff of the Ukrainian Insurgent Army focusing on political education.

== Post-war underground ==
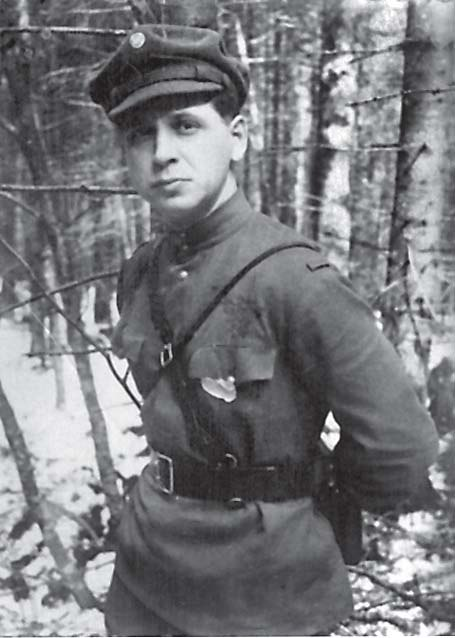
Fedun in the uniform of a Ukrainian Insurgent Army major, 1950 or 1951

German forces were expelled from Galicia as a result of the Lvov-Sandomierz Offensive in the summer of 1944. For Fedun and other members of the OUN-B and UPA, however, the war was far from at an end. At the same time as the German defeat, Fedun joined the Ukrainian Supreme Liberation Council, a political body established by the OUN-B. He also began to rise through the ranks of the UPA, obtaining the rank of senior bulavnyi on 1 October 1944. The next month, he joined the political education office of the Leadership of the OUN, under the leadership of Yakiv Busel.

According to historian Volodymyr Marchuk, after the death of Yosyp Pozychaniuk in December 1944, Fedun became leader of the Main Propaganda Cell and Information Service. Volodymyr Hinda, also a historian, has disputed this, saying that Fedun was appointed as head of the Main Propaganda Cell and the information service of the Main Military Staff upon the 1945 deaths of Busel and propagandist Dmytro Maivskyi. Hinda states that at this time Fedun had acquired a reputation among members of the OUN underground for his oratical and journalistic skills.

Fedun authored a directive of the Main Propaganda Cell titled "On Some Political and Propaganda Errors", published 28 January 1946. Fedun's work was significant in determining the publicly stated ideology of the UPA. It called on the UPA's political educators to refer to Bolshevism as a distinct, incorrect form of communism, and to downplay negative references to the Russian people, including by referring to them as Asiatic. Fedun also called on political educators to cease pejoratively referring to the Soviets as "red", saying that "the fight under the red flag is being waged in all the world, and this is a just fight." Simultaneously, the directive instructed educators to describe the United Nations as a reactionary and imperialist body, and to downplay the Nuremberg trials. Fedun expressed opposition to working with the Polish Home Army, as well as the Romanian Iron Guard and other anti-communist insurgencies in Central and Eastern Europe.

Fedun also took aim at illiteracy among the UPA's ranks, particularly in propaganda, creating one person to proofread such works. Fedun further encouraged the adoption of the 1946 Soviet Ukrainian textbook by Leonid Bulakhovskyi among the UPA, editing it to remove elements of Russification from Ukrainian. Other works produced by Fedun during this time period, among them The Concept of a Self-Governing Ukraine and the Basic Tendency of the Modern World's Ideological-Political Development (1946), Ukraine is Dying! Who is to Blame for This? (1948), and Why the USSR Must Be Rebuilt on the Principle of Independent National States (1950), would become hallmarks of ideological propaganda distributed to soldiers of the UPA at this time. Fedun's activities in organising the printing and publication of pro-UPA materials throughout Galicia was also remarkably successful - around one hundred printing houses were under his control, with one Drohobych Oblast printer having a circulation of 300,000 in the winter of 1949–1950 alone.

Throughout the early post-war period, Fedun continued to rapidly rise through the ranks; he acquired the rank of standard-bearer in April 1945, followed by a promotion to lieutenant two months later. He would be further promoted to sotnik in January 1946. As a commander, Fedun had a fearsome reputation; on one occasion in 1946, he threatened to execute a cook for falling asleep while working, and on another occasion in the winter of 1948–1949, he executed a cook for putting more butter in his own kasha than that of anyone else.

In 1948, Fedun published what would go on to be his most successful work. Who are the Banderites and What are They Fighting For?, published in both Russian and Ukrainian, served to encourage those loyal to the Soviet government or otherwise opposed to the UPA to reconsider their position. According to historian Dmytro Vedienieiev, it was among the most popular propaganda works of the UPA during this time period. The death of UPA leader Roman Shukhevych in March 1950 also proved fortunate for Fedun's career advancement. Vasyl Kuk was selected as Shukhevych's successor, and Fedun received two new positions: deputy commander of the UPA and Deputy General Secretary of the Ukrainian Supreme Liberation Council. He was also promoted to major in July of the same year, and received a final promotion to the rank of colonel in October 1951.

In a classified 1 December 1951 intelligence assessment, the MGB stated that Fedun had gone into opposition against Bandera's supporters within the UPA. According to the MGB's assessment, Fedun and Vasyl Okhrymovych were the leaders of the reformist faction, which was supported by the American Central Intelligence Agency. This was contrary to the Banderites, who were believed to be backed by the British MI6. Prior to 1951 Fedun had sought to place himself as a mediator to other members of the OUN and UPA, such as Shukhevych. In particular, he advocated for what he described as a compromise on the renaming of the OUN, a cause pursued by reformists. Rather than removing the term "nationalists" from the name, as reformists desired, he sought to suffix the group's name with the slogan "Independence, Socialism, Democracy".

=== Death ===
Hinda states that Who are the Banderites and What are They Fighting For? led the Soviet government to focus on eliminating Fedun. A criminal case into Fedun began in 1949, overseen by the Ministry of State Security (MGB) and given the codename of Operation Jackal. Operation Jackal's scope was broadened in 1950, with a 20-man team being tasked with finding and killing Fedun. Several attempts were unsuccessfully made to capture Fedun prior to his death, including one case in which case MGB agents posed as the deceased Shukhevych.

In the autumn of 1951, by now dealing with direct attacks from MGB officers, Fedun travelled to Zhydachiv Raion, where he was placed under the guard of UPA commander Roman Kravchuk. The MGB received information in December of that year that a member of the OUN Leadership was hiding in the villages of Vyshniv or Novoshyny. A total of 4,574 officers were devoted to this final stage of Operation Jackal, occurring from 21 to 28 December 1951. All paths out of the area between Vyshniv and Novoshyny were blocked, and a kryivka was soon discovered. In the ensuing battle, two UPA commanders, Kravchuk and Bohdan Pankiv, were killed. At around 23:30 on 23 December, cadets participating in the operation as part of their training discovered another kryivka from a steam vent in the ground. Although they were given the chance to surrender, the UPA soldiers in the kryivka refused. Seeing no possibility of escaping, they chose to burn the bunker and shoot themselves instead. Following the fire, four bodies were recovered by the MGB, belonging to Fedun and three others.

Since the 1989–1991 Ukrainian revolution Fedun's image has been rehabilitated as an alternative to the new Soviet man, with particular focus on Fedun's knowledge of and pride in Ukrainian history and his perceived willingness to place the good of Ukraine above all else.

== Political positions ==
Self-described as a socialist, Fedun was an ideologue of the principles of social democracy and democratic socialism present in the OUN-B's reformist wing. In a 28 January 1946 internal memo on propaganda, Fedun expressed opposition to specifically using the term "red" as a pejorative against the Soviets and instead advocated for the Soviets to be described as opponents of real socialism. In the same memo, he also positively assessed the electoral victories of the British Labour Party and the French Section of the Workers' International, viewing them as ideological contemporaries because "we are for the destruction of people's exploitation of people, for the destruction of the capitalist system."

Fedun additionally expressed opposition to imperialism globally, basing his resistance to the United Nations and support for socialist revolutions globally upon such principles. He further supported the Third Supreme Assembly of the Organisation of Ukrainian Nationalists, expressly backing the Supreme Assembly's provisions on separation of church and state and private ownership of land.
