= Ihor Kozhan =

Ukrainian archivist (born 1953)

- Ігор Кожан
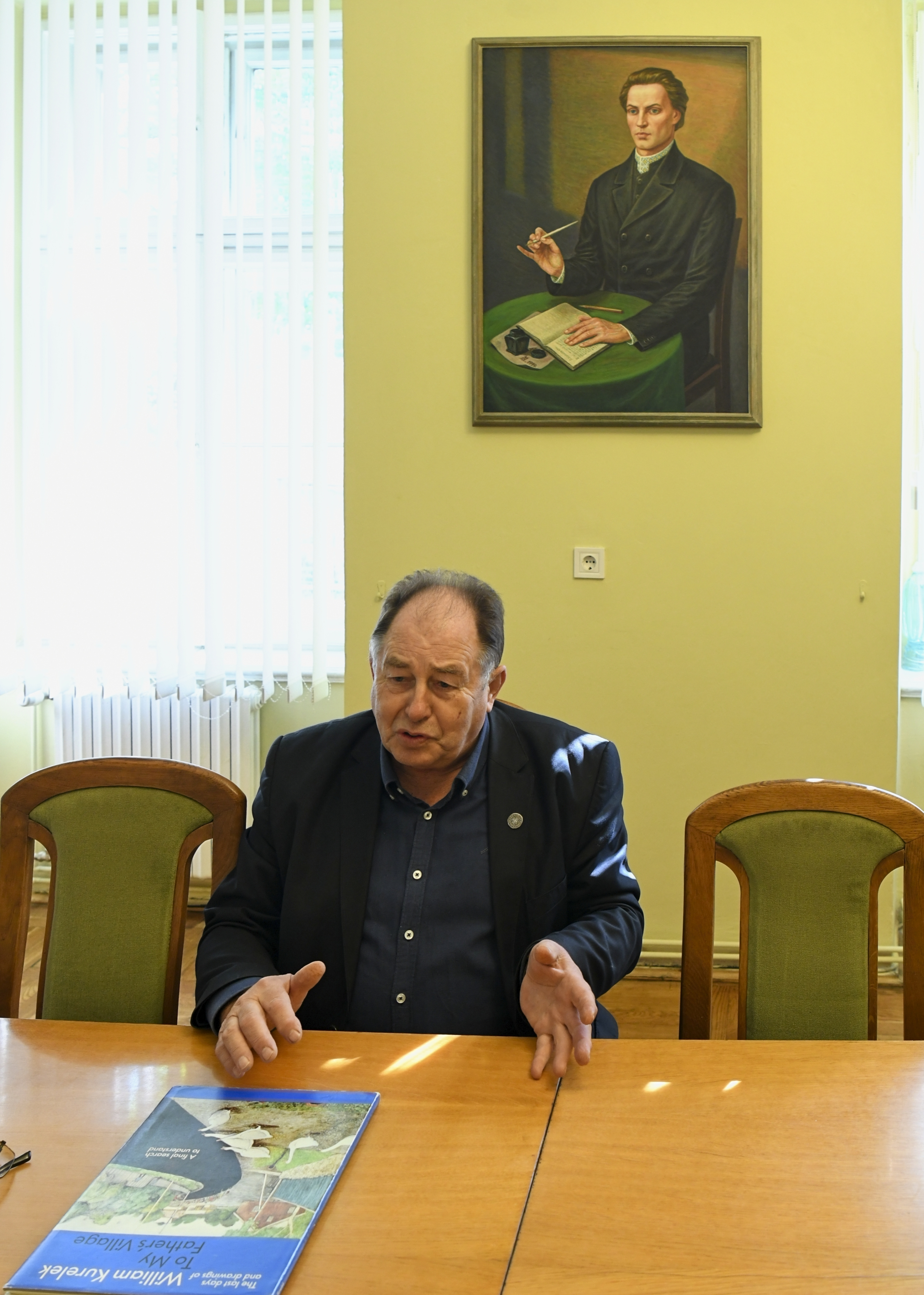
- Born: Ihor Volodymyrovych Kozhan; 17 January 1953 (age 73); Lviv, Ukrainian SSR, Soviet Union
- Education: Uzhhorod University, National Academy of Government Managerial Staff of Culture and Arts
- Occupations: Archivist, cultural and public figure
- Awards: Order of Merit; Merited Culture Worker of Ukraine; Meritorious Activist of Culture of Poland

Ihor Volodymyrovych Kozhan (Ukrainian: Ігор Володимирович Кожан; born 17 January 1953) is a Ukrainian archivist, cultural and public figure. He is director general of the Andrey Sheptytsky National Museum of Lviv (from 2005) and a member of the Ukrainian National Committee of the International Council of Museums.

== Biography ==
Ihor Kozhan was born on 17 January 1953 in Lviv.

He studied at Lviv Specialized Secondary School No. 8. He graduated from Uzhhorod University (1979, majoring in history) and the National Academy of Government Managerial Staff of Culture and Arts (2008).

While studying at the History Department of the University of Lviv, he was caught in a wave of repression unleashed by the authorities against nationally conscious figures of science and education (1972–1973); for participating in a dissident student group, he was expelled from the university (1973) with the wording "behavior unworthy of the title of a Soviet student".

In 1973–1975, he served in the Soviet Army.

Kozhan worked as a laboratory assistant at the Department of Museology (1975–1976), a senior laboratory assistant at the Department of Carpathian Studies (1976–1980) at the Museum of Ethnography and Arts and Crafts of the Academy of Sciences of the USSR, a junior researcher at the Lviv Branch of the Rylsky Institute of Art History, Folklore and Ethnography of the Academy of Sciences of the USSR (1980–1984), an educator and teacher of social disciplines at the Lviv Film College (1985–1988).

He is fluent in German and Polish.

=== National Museum of Lviv ===
He worked at the Andrey Sheptytsky National Museum of Lviv: junior researcher (1988), head of the folk art sector (1989–1990), scientific secretary (1990–1991), deputy director for research (1991–1994), head of the department of exhibition and exposition and scientific and educational work (1994–2005), director general (from 2005 to the present).

While in the last position:

- he was an active participant in the successful effort to return to the museum three iconographic monuments stolen (1984) from the Armenian Cathedral's storage (2011, 2012)
- the museum was granted "national" status and named the Andrey Sheptytsky National Museum of Lviv (2005) on the 100th anniversary of its establishment
- he worked on the fund collections, and was involved in research expeditions in Lviv and Ternopil Oblasts
- the museum received as a gift the collection of works and archive of H. Horiun-Levytska (Canada), the art collection of I. Nosyk (USA), the archives of S. Hordynskyi (USA), V. Popovych (France), and A. Lisikevych (USA)
- he authored or co-authored 400 exhibitions; a number of catalogs of art exhibitions and scientific publications and albums on museum and art history.

He created museums in the Lviv Oblast, which at that time functioned as separate departments of the National Museum of Lviv: the Ustyianovych Museum (Vovkiv, Lviv Raion), Mykhailo Bilas Museum (Truskavets), Les Kurbas Museum, Boikivshchyna Museum (resumed operations), and the Children's Art Gallery (Sambir).

In 1991, he joined the initiative group for the liquidation of the Lviv branch of the Central Lenin Museum and the transfer of the building to the Scientific and Artistic Foundation – National Museum of Lviv (the then name of the institution). He co-curated the arrangement of the exhibition space in the newly acquired building (1991–1993).

He contributed to the development of international relations with museums and scientific institutions in Poland, Lithuania, the Czech Republic, Romania, Austria, France, Italy, Germany, Mexico, Canada, and the United States.

=== Cultural and public activities ===
Head of the Museum Council at the Ministry of Culture of Ukraine (2010–2012), State Examination Commission at the History Department of Ivan Franko National University of Lviv (2010–2015).

Co-founder and member of the Artes Charitable Foundation. Member of the Public Council "St. George", Supervisory Board of the Lviv National Academy of Arts.

Member of the organizing committees at the Curia of the Lviv Archeparchy of the UGCC on the occasion of the celebration of the 200th anniversary of the restoration of the Galician Metropolis and the formation of the Lviv Archeparchy; on the construction of monuments to Metropolitan Andrey Sheptytsky (2012–2015), Omelian Kovch (2012, Peremyshlyany, Lviv Oblast). Co-curator of the artistic action "200th anniversary of the Galician Metropolis" (2007).

== Awards and honors ==
- Order of Merit, 3rd degree (23 August 2022)
- Merited Culture Worker of Ukraine (23 March 2006)
- Meritorious Activist of Culture of Poland (2014)
- Pasquale Rotondi Prize of the XXV edition in the category "World Prize-2023"
