= Bukachivtsi settlement hromada =

Hromada in Ivano-Frankivsk Oblast, Ukraine

Bukachivtsi settlement hromada Букачівська селищна громада
- hromada
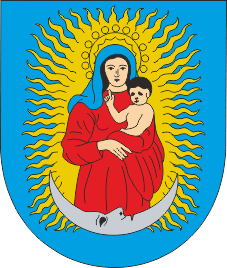
- Seal

- Location within Ivano-Frankivsk Oblast Location within Ukraine
- Coordinates: 49°15′30″N 24°29′50″E
- Country: Ukraine
- Oblast: Ivano-Frankivsk Oblast
- Raion: Ivano-Frankivsk Raion
- Administrative center: Bukachivtsi

Area
  - Total: 1,393 km^{2} (538 sq mi)

Population
  - Total: 4,776
- Rural settlement: 1
- Villages: 12
- Website: bukachivska-gromada.gov.ua

Bukachivtsi settlement hromada (Ukrainian: Букачівська селищна громада) is a hromada in Ukraine, in Ivano-Frankivsk Raion of Ivano-Frankivsk Oblast. The administrative center is the rural settlement of Bukachivtsi.

== Settlements ==
The hromada consists of 1 rural settlement (Bukachivtsi) and 12 villages:

- Bukachivska Sloboda
- Vytan
- Vyshniv
- Zhuravenky
- Zrub
- Kozari
- Posvirzh
- Cherniv
- Lukovets-Vyshnivskyi
- Lukovets-Zhurivskyi
- Kolokolyn
- Chahriv
