= Pyotr Ilyich Bilan =

Soviet painter

- Born: 21 July 1921; Novaya Nikolaevka, Zaporozhe Region, Ukrainian SSR, RSFSR
- Died: 22 September 1996 (aged 75); Kyiv, Ukraine
- Occupations: Painter and illustrator
- Awards: Honored Artist of the USSR

Pyotr Ilyich Bilan (Russian: Петр Ильич Билан; 21 July 1921 – 22 September 1996) was an honored Soviet Russian - Ukrainian painter working in the genre of easel painting. His works particularly include portraits, landscapes and thematic paintings.

== Biography ==
Pyotr Ilyich Bilan was born on 7 July 1921, in the village of Novonikolaevka in the Zaporizhzhia region, Ukrainian SSR, USSR. He was a soldier in World War II and was recruited in 1940. He became a prisoner of war when captured in the Belarusian SSR close to the Polish border in July 1941 by Nazi Germany. He was deported to different unknown locations and escaped a prisoner camp in Badisch-Rheinfelden after having been condemned to death on Easter in 1942. He escaped the camp by breaking the barbed wire and swimming across the partly frozen River Rhine to Switzerland by night. In Switzerland, he was sheltered by a farmer family and spent a few days in prison in Rheinfelden. He was the first Russian prisoner of war who escaped to Switzerland from Germany in World War II. Thereafter, Germany requested from Switzerland that Pyotr Bilan be delivered and made him a Reichsverbrecher. He was then brought to Aarau and in 1943 he joined other refugees in Mönthal as a translator where he had time to paint. Whilst in Switzerland, he visited the art school for interned Italians in Kirchberg. Pyotr Bilan then escaped to France and traveled via Southern Italy, Egypt, and the Black Sea to Odessa, where he arrived in 1945. He visited Switzerland and Germany later in his life. He lived and worked in Kyiv and died on 22 September 1996.

== Art and career ==
Before World War II, Pyotr Bilan studied at the Odessa Art College from 1937 to 1948. After the war, he studied at the Leningrad Art College from 1946 to 1948 and the Kyiv Art Institute 1949–1955. He was a member of the USSR Academy of Arts and took part in art exhibitions within the UdSSR as well as abroad. His paintings reside in the Kyiv Historical Museum, the Lviv National Museum and other museums of Ukraine and in private collections throughout the world.
