= Bukachivtsi =

Rural locality in Ivano-Frankivsk Oblast, Ukraine

Coordinates: 49°14′59″N 24°30′0″E

Bukachivtsi Букачівці
- Rural settlement
- Location within Ivano-Frankivsk Oblast Location within Ukraine
- Country: Ukraine
- Oblast: Ivano-Frankivsk Oblast
- Raion: Ivano-Frankivsk Raion

Population (2022)
  - Total: 1,156

Bukachivtsi (Ukrainian: Букачівці; Polish: Bukaczowce) is a rural settlement in Ivano-Frankivsk Raion, Ivano-Frankivsk Oblast, Ukraine. It hosts the administration of Bukachivtsi settlement hromada, one of the hromadas of Ukraine. Population: 1,156 (2022 estimate).

== History ==
The village had an important Jewish community which was destroyed during World War II.

Until 18 July 2020, Bukachivtsi belonged to Rohatyn Raion. The raion was abolished in July 2020 as part of the administrative reform of Ukraine, which reduced the number of raions of Ivano-Frankivsk Oblast to six. The area of Rohatyn Raion was merged into Ivano-Frankivsk Raion.

Until 26 January 2024, Bukachivtsi was designated urban-type settlement. On this day, a new law entered into force which abolished this status, and Bukachivtsi became a rural settlement.
