= Vyshniv, Ivano-Frankivsk Oblast =

Rural locality in Ivano-Frankivsk Oblast, Ukraine

Vyshniv Вишнів
- Location in Ivano-Frankivsk Oblast Vyshniv (Ukraine)
- Coordinates: 49°16′4″N 24°24′8″E
- Country: Ukraine
- Oblast: Ivano-Frankivsk Oblast
- Raion: Ivano-Frankivsk Raion
- Hromada: Bukachivtsi settlement hromada
- Time zone: UTC+2 (EET)
  - Summer (DST): UTC+3 (EEST)
- Postal code: 77063

Vyshniv (Ukrainian: Вишнів) is a village in the Bukachivtsi settlement hromada of the Ivano-Frankivsk Raion of Ivano-Frankivsk Oblast in Ukraine.

== History ==
It is mentioned on 22 June 1439 in the books of the Galician court.

On 19 July 2020, as a result of the administrative-territorial reform and liquidation of the Rohatyn Raion, the village became part of the Ivano-Frankivsk Raion.

== Religion ==
- Saint Michael church (1804, wooden)

== Notable residents ==
- Petro Fedun (1919–1951), Ukrainian revolutionary writer, journalist, and politician
- Iryna Shukhevych (1885–1979), Ukrainian artist and iconographer

== Bibliography ==
- "Wiszniów, wś, powiat rohatyński". Geographical Dictionary of the Kingdom of Poland (in Polish). 13. Warszawa: Kasa im. Józefa Mianowskiego. 1893. p. 625.
