= Volodymyr Sichynskyi =

- Володимир Січинський
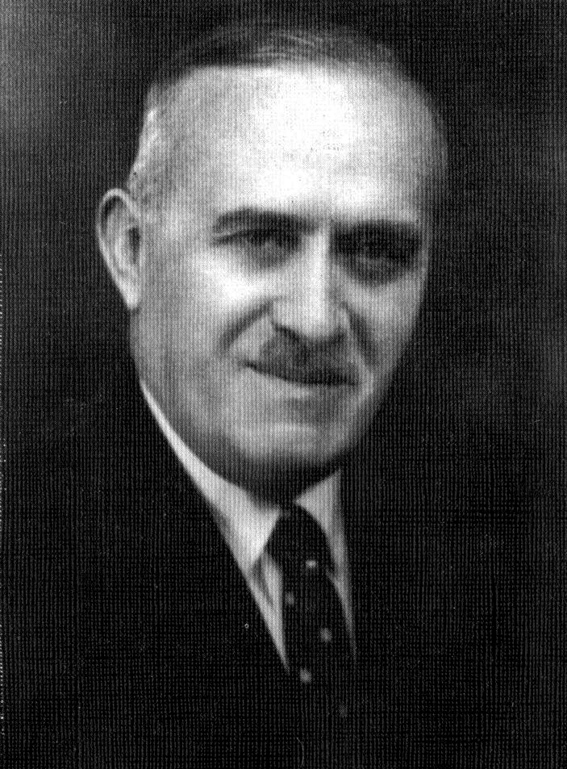
- Born: June 24, 1894; Kamianets-Podilskyi, Russian Empire (now Ukraine)
- Died: June 25, 1962 (aged 68); Paterson, New Jersey, U.S.
- Occupations: Architect, graphic artist, art historian

Volodymyr Yukhymovych Sichynskyi (Note: Ukrainian: Володимир Юхимович Січинський, romanized: Volodymyr Yukhymovych Sichynskyi) (June 24, 1894 – June 25, 1962) was a Ukrainian émigré architect, graphic artist, and art historian.

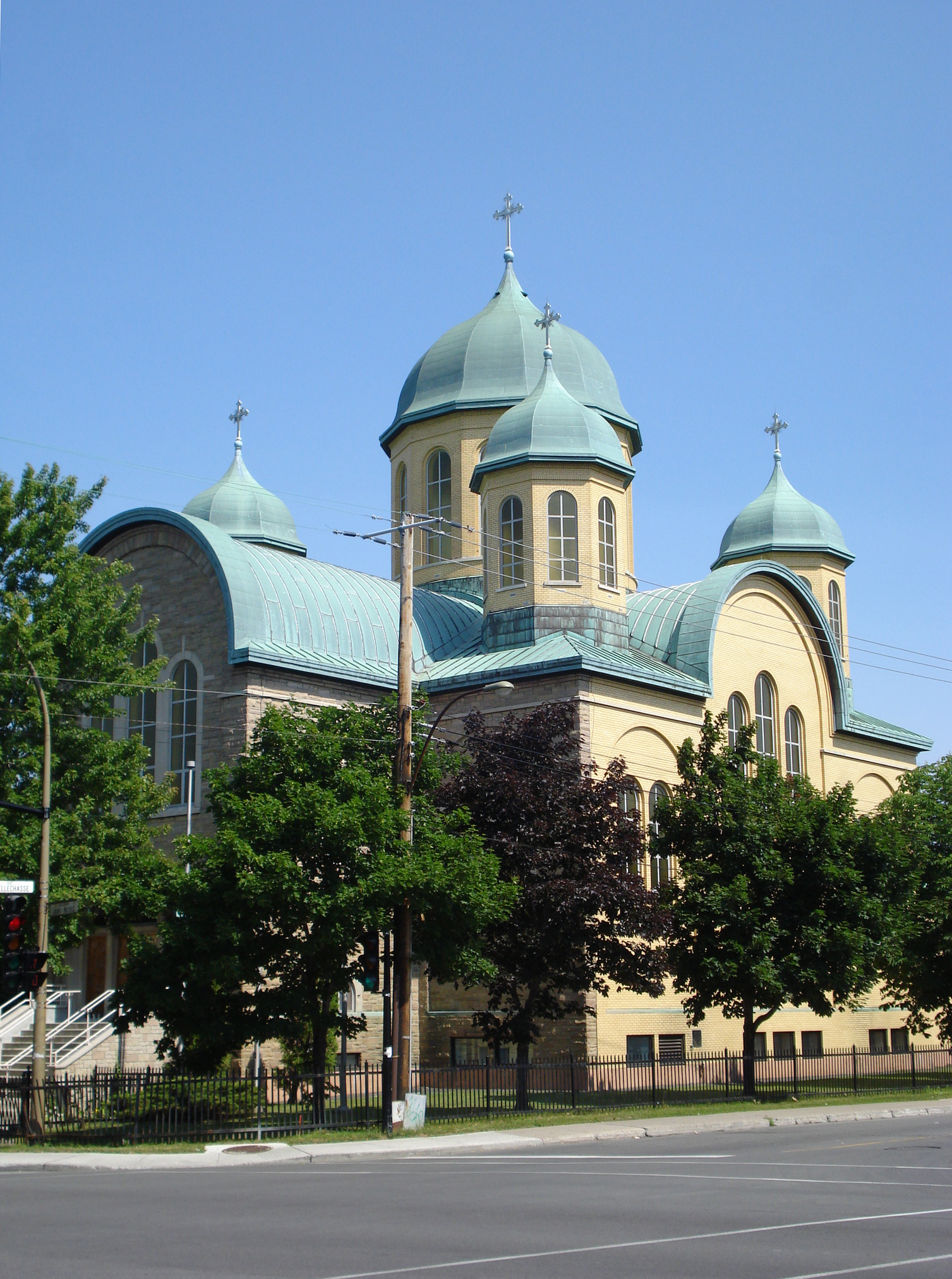
Orthodox Cathedral in Montreal

Volodymyr Sichynskyi was born to the family of Yukhym Sitsinskyi in Kamianets-Podilskyi, Podilia guberniya, Russia, which is in present-day Ukraine.

He graduated from the Kamianets Technical School in 1912, and then continued his studies at the St. Petersburg Institute of Civil Engineers (1912–1917) and at Charles University in Prague (1924–1927). During the interim between St. Petersburg and Prague, he taught at the Kamianets Gymnasium (1918–1919), helped organize the Architectural Institute in Kyiv (1918–1919) and served as director of the construction department of the Podolia Governorate.

After fleeing from Soviet rule to Lviv, he taught at the Academic Gymnasium there (1921–1923) and then moved to Prague. In Prague, he worked on his doctoral degree, taught at the art-school "Studio" (1923–1945), and served as a lecturer of the history of art at the Ukrainian Higher Pedagogical Institute (1923–1933). He received his Ph.D. and was promoted to the rank of professor on October 5, 1927.

He also chaired the Library and Bibliographic Commission of the Ukrainian Society of Bibliophiles in Prague from 1927 and served as the society's president (1934–1943). In 1930 he co-founded the Association of Independent Ukrainian Artists in Lviv. From 1930 he was also a full member of the Shevchenko Scientific Society in Lviv. Sichynskyi was appointed an assistant professor of art history on January 25, 1940, at the Ukrainian Free University, and then was promoted to associate professor on March 22, 1942.

From 1943 to 1945, he was imprisoned and tortured by the Gestapo in Prague and in Berlin. A postwar refugee in Germany, in 1949 he emigrated to the United States where he continued to teach at the Ukrainian Technical Institute in New York City. He died on June 25, 1962, in Paterson, New Jersey, aged 68.

In addition to teaching, Sichynskyi worked as an architect designing churches, schools, and many private and public buildings in Ukraine, Slovakia, Brazil, Canada, and the United States. He designed the Redemptorist Church of the Holy Spirit in Michalovce (1933–1934) and the Boiko-style wooden Church of the Nativity of the Mother of God in Nizny Komarnik, just south of the Dukla mountain pass (1937), both in Slovakia; the Ukrainian churches in Whippany, New Jersey (1949), and Porto União, Brazil (1951); and the Orthodox cathedral in Montreal (1957).

Sichynskyi published over 500 articles, books, and reviews. He is the author of works on Ukrainian art, culture, architecture, engraving and printing, industry, and foreign sources on the history of Ukraine. Two bio-bibliographies of Sichynskyi have been published:

- Volodymyr Sichyns'kyi: arkhitekt, mystets'hrafik, mystetstvoznavets, doslidnyk - by Ivan Keivan (Toronto, 1957)
- Volodymyr Sichyns'kyi: biobibliohrafichnyi pokazhchyk - (Lviv, 1996).

In addition, proceedings of a conference devoted to Sichynskyi have been published under the editorship of Viacheslav Kolomiiets in Kyiv in 1996.

== Illustrated works ==
- Еверс, Г. Г. (1923). Індія і я. Львів: Накладом Видавничої Спілки. OCLC 7380719.

== Sources and external links ==
- Volodymyr Sichynskyi Collection, Ukrainian Research Institute, Harvard University
- Volodymyr Sichynskyi. Andriienko. Lviv, 1934.
- V. Sichynsky. History of Ukrainian Art. 2. Architecture. New York, By the Shevchenko Scientific Society in the USA, 1956.
- V. Sichynsky, Ukraine in Foreign Comments and Descriptions (sourcebook on foreign impressions of Ukraine]
