= Sviatoslav Hordynskyi =

Ukrainian poet, translator, literary critic, artist, and art historian (1906–1993)

- Святослав Ярославович Гординський
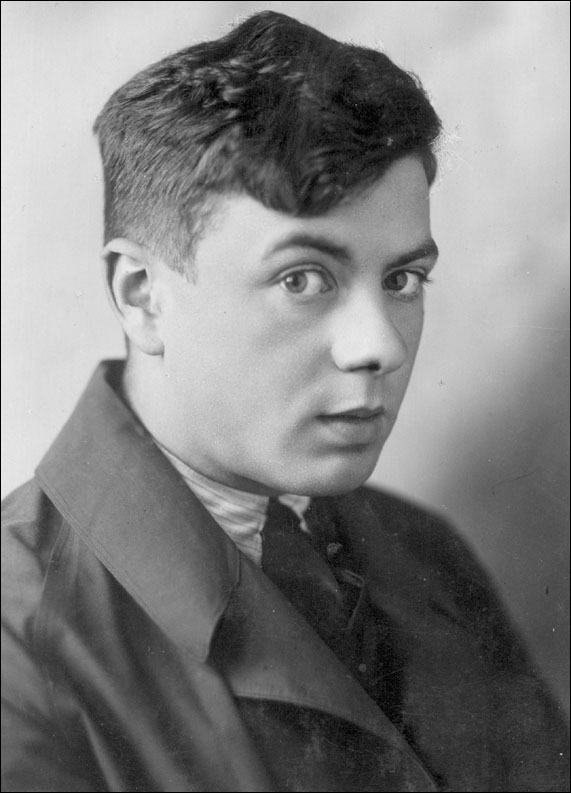
- Born: 30 December 1906; Kolomyia, Austria-Hungary (now Ukraine)
- Died: 20 May 1993 (aged 86); Verona, New Jersey, U.S.
- Other names: Yurii Burevii, Ivan Palytsia, S. H., s. h., Hor., S. Hord.
- Education: Oleksa Novakivskyi Art School, Berlin Academy of Arts, Académie Fernand Léger
- Occupations: Poet, translator, literary critic, artist, art historian

Sviatoslav Hordynskyi Sas coat of arms (Ukrainian: Святослав Ярославович Гординський; 30 December 1906 – 20 May 1993) was a Ukrainian poet, translator, literary critic, artist, and art historian. In 1952 he became a full member of the Shevchenko Scientific Society. Son of Yaroslav, brother of Bohdan-Zynovii, Volodymyr-Yevhen Hordynskyi, Dariia Hordynska-Karanovych, wife of Mariia Hordynska-Chapelska.

== Biography ==
Sviatoslav Hordynskyi was born on 30 December 1906 in Kolomyia, now Ivano-Frankivsk Oblast of Ukraine.

As a child, due to hearing loss, Hordynskyi graduated from the Ukrainian Academic Gymnasium of Lviv in 1924 as an external student. Later he graduated from the Oleksa Novakivskyi Art School, and in 1928 from the Berlin Academy of Arts, and from 1929 he studied at the Académie Fernand Léger in Paris.

From 1931, he lived in Lviv, where he co-founded the Association of Independent Ukrainian Artists; he also edited the magazine "Mystetstvo" and co-edited the literary and artistic biweekly "Nazustrich".

In 1939, some time before the Red Army occupied Lviv, Hordynskyi moved to Kraków, where he worked as a literary and artistic editor of the Ukrainian Publishing House. Later, after the end of World War II, he was in the camps for displaced persons in Munich, and in 1949 he emigrated to Verona, New Jersey, U.S. He co-founded the Ukrainian Artist's Association in USA.

He died on 18 May 1993 in Verona, U.S. He is buried at the St. Andrew's Ukrainian Cemetery in Bound Brook, New Jersey, U.S.

== Works ==
Hordynskyi is also known as a translator of many languages, including The Tale of Igor's Campaign.

Poetry collections:

- Barvy i linii (1933),
- Buruny (1936),
- Slova na kameniakh (1937),
- Viter nad poliamy (1938),
- Lehendy hir (1939),
- Sim lit (1939),
- Surmy dniv (1941),
- Pershyi val (1941),
- Vybrani poezii (1944),
- Vohnem i smerchem (1947),
- Poezii (1989),
- I peremovy barv, i dynamichnist linii (1990).

Individual editions:

- Poety Zakhodu (1961),
- Kolir i rytmy (1977),
- Na perelomi epokh: Literaturoznavchi statti, ohliady, esei, retsenzii, spohady, lysty (2004),
- V oboroni kultury. Spohady, portrety, narysy (2005).

Hordynskyi was also recognized as a monumentalist, iconographer, and book graphic artist. He participated in graphic arts exhibitions in Warsaw (1932), Berlin (1933), and Rome (1938), as well as in group exhibitions in the US and Canada. He has created paintings and posters, as well as painted churches in Europe and America.

He was also a talented art critic, publishing books about art:

- Mykola Hlushchenko (1934),
- Taras Shevchenko — maliar (1942),
- Pavlo Kovzhun. 1896–1939 (1943),
- Kruk– Pavlos–Mukhyn — try ukrainski rizbari (1947),
- Introduction to Archipenko: Fifty Creative Years, 1908–1959 (1960),
- Ukrainski tserkvy u Polshchi, yikh istoriia, arkhitektura i dolia (1969),
- Ukrainska ikona 12–18 st. (1973 in Ukrainian and English; German translation 1981),
- Petro Andrusiv (1981).

== Honoring ==
In 2006, Ukraine celebrated the 100th anniversary of Hordynskyi's birth at the state level, which was crowned by an exhibition at the National Museum of Lviv entitled "Facets of Creativity: Early Graphics, Literary and Critical Heritage".
