= Halyna Stelmashchuk =

Ukrainian art historian (born 1943)

- Галина Григорівна Стельмащук
- Born: 10 May 1943 (age 83); Horodyni (now Volyn Oblast, Ukraine)
- Education: Lviv Institute of Applied and Decorative Arts
- Occupation: Art historian
- Awards: Order of Princess Olga, 3rd class

Halyna Hryhorivna Stelmashchuk (Ukrainian: Галина Григорівна Стельмащук; born 10 May 1943) is a Ukrainian scholar specializing in the history and theory of decorative and applied arts, art criticism, and ethnology. She holds a Doctorate in Arts and is a Professor at the Lviv National Academy of Arts. In 2017, she was elected an Academician of the National Academy of Arts of Ukraine.

== Biography ==
She was born on 10 May 1943 in Horodyni, now part of Lutsk Raion, Volyn Oblast, Ukraine.

In 1948, her parents were arrested and deported during Soviet political repressions. They were officially rehabilitated in 1992.

She completed her secondary education in 1960 at an orphanage located in the village of Krupa-Hranytsia, Lutsk Raion, Volyn Oblast.

In 1971, she graduated from the Lviv Institute of Applied and Decorative Arts, a prominent institution known for its contributions to Ukrainian artistic education.

Between 1976 and 1989, she worked as a researcher at the Lviv Branch of the Rylsky Institute of Philology of the Academy of Sciences of the USSR. This institution is now known as the Institute of Ethnology, part of the National Academy of Sciences of Ukraine.

Starting in 1989, she began teaching at the Lviv Institute of Applied and Decorative Arts, which later became the Lviv National Academy of Arts. From 2003 to 2024, she served as the Head of the Department of History and Theory of Art.

She earned her Doctorate in Art History in 1994 and was awarded the academic title of Professor in 1996, having held the position since 1993. She became a member of the National Union of Artists of Ukraine in 1989 and was elected as an Academician of the National Academy of Arts of Ukraine on 20 June 2017.

Since 22 October 2024, she has held the position of Professor at the Design Department of Lesya Ukrainka Volyn National University.

== Works ==
Author of printed monographs, textbooks, chapters in collective scientific publications of the National Academy of Sciences of Ukraine. She regularly publishes in periodicals (about 400 publications). Dr. Stelmashchuk's scientific work is known in Ukraine and abroad. She has been published in journals in the USA, Poland, Canada, and others.

Chapters in collective works are part of her scientific work:

- Narodni khudozhni promysly Ukrainy (1986);
- Lemkivshchyna (1999);
- Istoriia Hutsulshchyny. Vol. 6 (2001, co-authored with M. Bilan);
- Istoriia ukrainskoi kultury (author of chapters in vol. 2 and vol. 4 - book 1);
- Etnohenez ta etnichna istoriia naselennia ukrainskykh Karpat. Vol. 2. Etnolohiia ta mystetstvoznavstvo (2006),
- Ukraina kozatska derzhava (2004) and others.

She takes an active part in writing chapters for the "History of Ukrainian Decorative Art of Ukraine", which is being prepared at the Rylsky Institute of Art Studies, Folklore and Ethnology of the National Academy of Sciences of Ukraine.

In a team of co-authors, she worked on textbooks and manuals Ukrainske narodoznavstvo (1994), Narysy z istorii zarubizhnoho dekoratyvno-uzhytkovoho mystetstva (1995), Ukrainske narodoznavstvo: pidruchnyk (2004).

She successfully combines her scientific work with teaching. Among her students are well-known artists, participants in many exhibitions, researchers, teachers, and art historians. Under her supervision, 24 candidates of art history were defended. Halyna Stelmashchuk is a member of two Specialized Academic Councils for the defense of candidate and doctoral dissertations at the Lviv National Academy of Arts and the Rylsky Institute of Art History, Folklore and Ethnology of the National Academy of Sciences of Ukraine (Kyiv), and a member of the Expert Council of the Higher Attestation Commission of Ukraine.

In the art world, she is known as an organizer of art events, curator of exhibitions, author of catalogs and critical articles, as well as articles about artists in the Encyclopedia of Modern Ukraine.

=== Monographs, compilations ===
- Ukrainskyi narodnyi odiah XVII — pochatku ХІХ st. v akvareliakh Y. Hlohovskoho (1988, co-authored with Dmytro Krvavych).
- Tradytsiini holovni ubory ukraintsiv (1993, 1994)
- Ukrainskyi strii (2000; 2011, training manual, co-authored with M. Bilan).
- Davnie vbrannia na Volyni: etnohrafichno-mystetstvoznavche doslidzhennia (2006)
- Ekslibrysy rodyny Opanashchukiv (2006)
- Mykola Opanashchuk. Hrafika. Maliarstvo (2007)
- Yaroslav Stadnyk: Maliarstvo. Hrafika. Sakralnyi zhyvopys. Prykladne mystetstvo (album, 2009)
- Ukrainske narodne vbrannia (2013)
- Ukrainski narodni holovni ubory (2013)
- Ukrainski myttsi u sviti. Materialy do vyvchennia istorii ukrainskoho mystetstva ХХ st. (2013)
- Lviv National Academy of Arts (2006, co-author)
- Mystetstvoznavchyi avtohraf / Collection of scientific works of the Department of History and Theory of Art of the Lviv National Academy of Arts (editor-in-chief and compiler; Issue 1, 2006; Issue 2, 2007; Issue 3, 2008; Issue 4-5, 2009-2010; Issue 6-8, 2014)
- Mystetstvoznavstvo Ukrainy. Collection of scientific papers. Special issue (2011, compiler)
- Khrystyna Kyshakevych–Kachaluba: koreni rodu, spadkoiemnist pokolin, khudozhnia tvorchist: Hrafika. Skulptura. Maliarstvo. Restavratsiia tvoriv. Dekoratyvno–uzhytkove mystetstvo (2018)
- Ukrainske narodne vbrannia (2019)
- Mariia Harasovska–Dachyshyn. Ukraina i svit u tvorchosti mystkyni (2020)
- Istoriia tradytsiinykh ukrainskykh prykras (2020, co-authored with H. Vrochynska).
- Tradytsiinyi strii etnohrafichnykh hrup ukraintsiv Karpat (2021).
- Kniaz Vsevolod Karmazyn–Kakovskyi: khudozhnia tvorchist, naukovo–doslidnytska pratsia, pedahohichna diialnist (2022)

=== Catalogs, albums ===
- Vystavka odiahu Stepanydy Hrytsai: Prospekt (1984, co-authored with R. Chuhai).
- Виставка творів Богдана Валька (1984, co-authored with M. Bilan).
- Mykola Opanashchuk. Hrafika. Maliarstvo: Catalog (1997)
- Dilovyi svit Ukrainy'99: Spetsvypusk: Catalog (1999, co-author)
- Mystetstvo. ART: Catalog (1999)
- U XXI stolittia z mystetstvom: Directory-Catalog (2002)
- Hrafika Mykoly Opanashchuka: Exhibition catalog (2004)
- Poetyka volynskoho vbrannia: naukovo-khudozhnia rekonstruktsiia (2005, article by Halyna Stelmashchuk)
- Opanashchuk: hrafika, maliarstvo: Exhibition catalog (2005)
- Introductory article // Roman Dmytryk / Album (2008)
- Introductory article // Marta Sukhania / Album (2008)
- Introductory article // Vasyl Bodnarchuk. Album (2008)
- Lemkivskyi vesilnyi strii // Lemko Calendar for 2005 (2004)

== Awards ==
- Badge of the Ministry of Education and Science of Ukraine "Excellence in Education".
- Sviatoslav Hordynskyi Prize (2002).
- Petro Mohyla Badge (2011).
- Gold medal of the National Academy of Arts of Ukraine "For significant creative achievements" (2013).
- Order of Princess Olga, 3rd class (2018).
- Gold medal of the Lviv National Academy of Arts. Order of Arts of the 1st degree of Ukraine (2023).

== Bibliography ==
- Stelmashchuk Halyna Hryhorivna / H. A. Skrypnyk // Encyclopedia of Modern Ukraine [Online] / Eds. : I. М. Dziuba, A. I. Zhukovsky, M. H. Zhelezniak [et al.]; National Academy of Sciences of Ukraine, Shevchenko Scientific Society. – Kyiv : The NASU institute of Encyclopedic Research, 2024.
- "Галина Григорівна Стельмащук, Академік НАМ України". Національна академія мистецтв України.
- "Стельмащук Галина Григорівна". Логос Україна.
- "Стельмащук Галина Григорівна". Волинська обласна бібліотека для юнацтва.
- "Галина Григорівна Стельмащук". Факультет історії та теорії мистецтва ЛНАМ. Archived from the original on 2011-05-17.
- Г. Г. Стельмащук. Українські митці у світі. Матеріали до історії українського мистецтва XX ст.. — Львівська національна академія мистецтв (Науково-дослідний сектор). — Львів : Апріорі, 2013. — 520 с. — ISBN 978-617-629-152-7. — С. 514—515.
