= Andrey Sheptytsky National Museum of Lviv =

Ukrainian museum

Coordinates: 49°50′35″N 24°01′41″E

Lviv National Museum
- Національний музей у Львові імені Андрея Шептицького
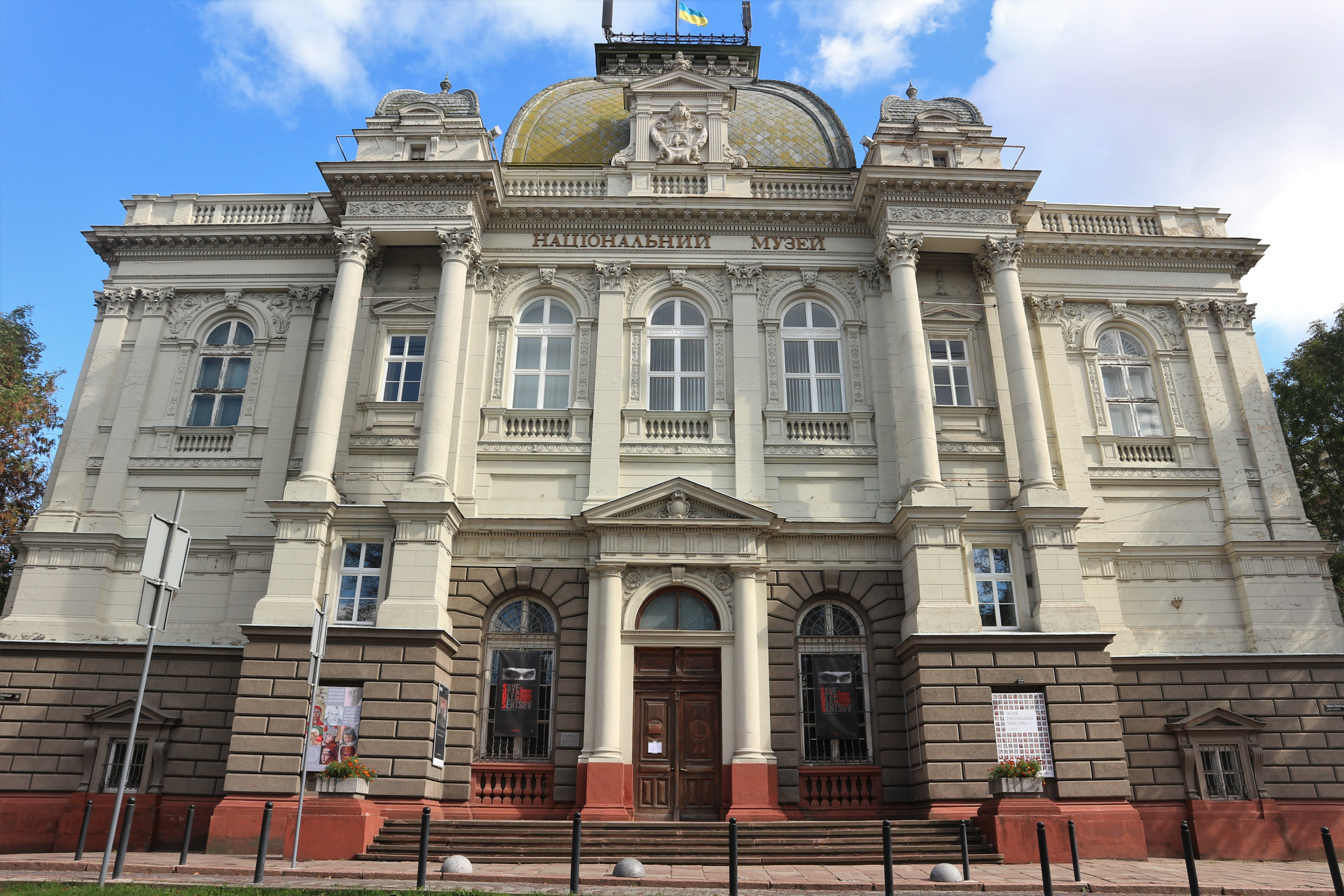
- Main building on Svobody Avenue
- Established: 1905
- Location: Lviv
- Founder: Andrey Sheptytsky
- Director: Ihor Kozhan
- Website: nml.com.ua/en

Immovable Monument of Local Significance of Ukraine
- Official name: Міський промисловий музей (City Industrial Museum)
- Type: Architecture
- Reference no.: 5268-Лв

The Andrey Sheptytsky National Museum of Lviv (Ukrainian: Національний музей у Львові імені Андрея Шептицького) is one of Ukraine's largest museums, dedicated to Ukrainian culture in all its manifestations. It was established by Metropolitan Archbishop Andrey Sheptytsky in 1905 and was initially named the Lwow Ecclesiastical Museum.

== History ==
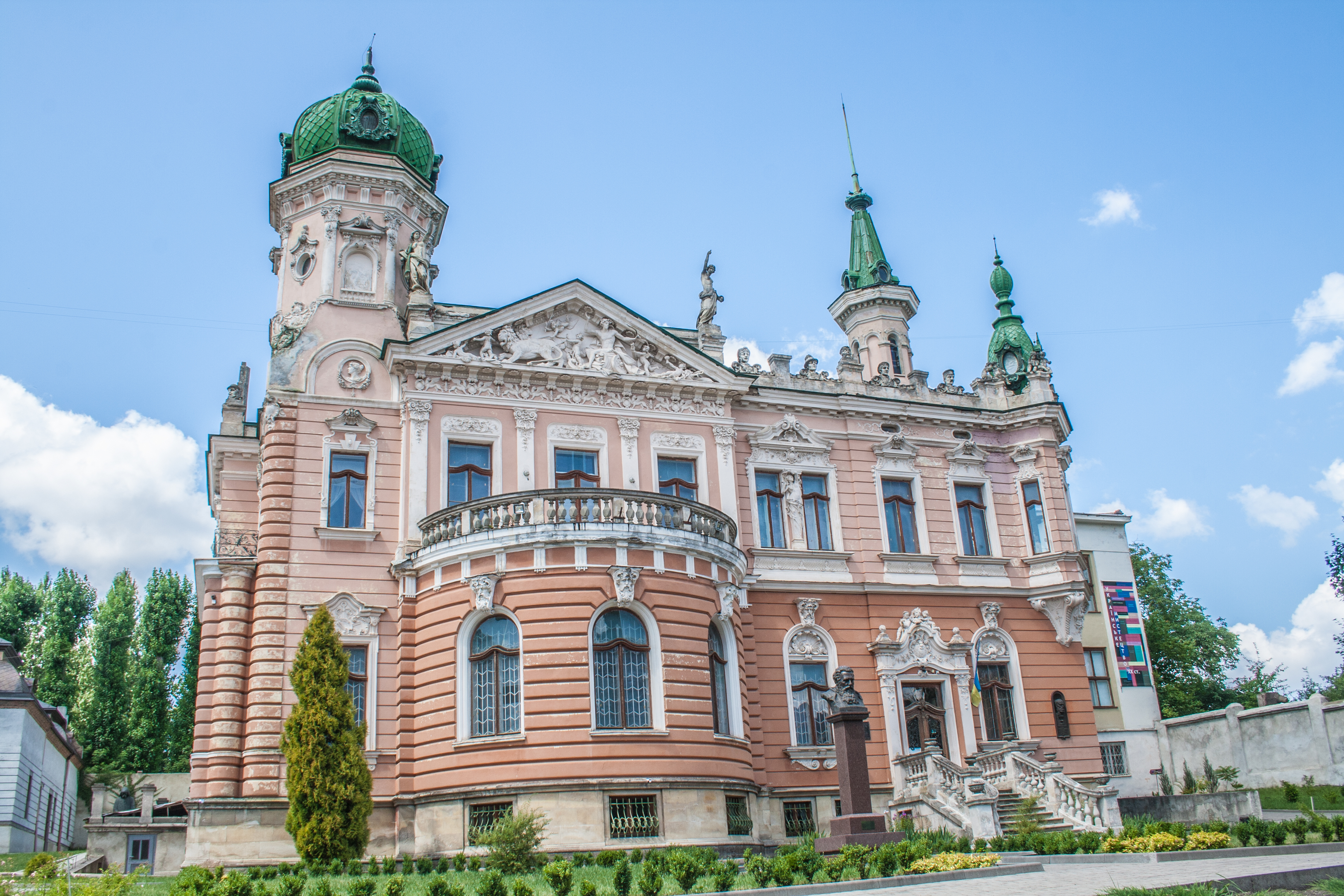
Second building of the museum on Drahomanova Street

Sheptytsky donated around 10,000 items to the museum and raised the funds required for its maintenance. A Neo-Baroque villa was acquired to house the collections.

After World War II, the museum was renamed the Lviv Museum of Ukrainian Art. The collection was augmented by adding a number of exhibits confiscated from other Lviv museums. By the late 20th century, the museum's holdings of Ukrainian icons and folk art were the largest in the country.

The National Museum now occupies the building of the former Lviv Industrial Museum, which housed the Lenin Museum in Soviet times. A cluster of memorial houses and the Sokalshchina Museum in Chervonohrad are affiliated with the National Museum.

During the 2022 Russian invasion of Ukraine, some works were removed from display for safety; they included the Bohorodchany iconostasis. The curator of books and manuscripts, Anna Naurobska, described the importance of the collections, as: “This is our story; this is our life. It is very important to us.”

== Collection ==
Nowadays the museum houses over 100,000 items, representing centuries-old traditions of development of Ukrainian art and national culture. It has four permanent exhibitions: "Old Ukrainian Art"; "Art of the 19th to the Beginning of the 20th Century"; "Ukrainian Art of the 20th Century"; and "Folk Art", with 1,800 objects on display. It also hosts temporary exhibitions.

The museum holds an extensive collection of Ukrainian religious works of art spanning the 12th–18th centuries, including 4000 icons, sculptures, and manuscripts (including the Horodyshche or Buchach Gospel). Prominent in the museum's collection are icons from the 14th–18th centuries, mainly from Western Ukraine. It is known that Illarion Swiecki came to the village of Mshanets, Boykiv, to personally take some of the older icons from the Church of the Nativity of the Blessed Virgin to the museum.

The Ukrainian renaissance and baroque periods are represented by the works of Ivan Rutkovych (the Zhovkva iconostasis of the 17th century) and Job Kondzelevych (the Bohorodchany iconostasis, 1698–1705). The museum also holds a collection of Ukrainian prints of the 17th–18th centuries (about 1000 pieces).

The museum has paintings by artists such as Johann Georg Pinsel, Ivan Rutkovych, Serhii Vasylkivsky, Antin Manastyrsky, Ivan Trush, Olena Kulchytska, Mykhailo Boychuk, Jakiw Hnizdowskyj, Oleksa Hryshchenko, Liuboslav Hutsaliuk, Vasyl Krychevsky, Michał Filewicz, Józefat Ignacy Łukasiewicz, Pyotr Ilyich Bilan, Oleksa Novakivskyi, Ivan Trush, Oleksandr Murashko and Taras Shevchenko and others.

The National Museum of Lviv also has a number of significant manuscripts, such as Kraków publications by Schweipolt Fiol (1491–1493), Prague and Vienna printings by Francysk Skaryna, and virtually all of Ivan Fedorov's publications.

== Foundation ==
Scientific and Artistic Foundation of the metropolitan bishop Andrey Sheptytsky.

- Memorial Art Museum Olena Kulchytska, Lviv
- Memorial Museum of Art Oleksa Novakivskyi, Lviv
- Leopold Levitsky Memorial Museum of Art, Lviv
- Mykhailo Bilas Art Museum, Truskavets
- Memorial Museum of Art Ivan Trush, Lviv
- Sokalshchyna Art Museum, Chervonohrad
- Boykivshchyna Art Museum, Sambir

== Directors ==
- Ilarion Svientsitskyi (1905–1952)
- Zhdan-Andrii Novakivskyi (1983–1994);
- Vasyl Otkovych (1994–2001)
- Myroslav Otkovych (2001–2003)
- Tetiana Lupii (2003–2005)
- Ihor Kozhan (from 2005 to the present)

== Gallery of some works on display ==
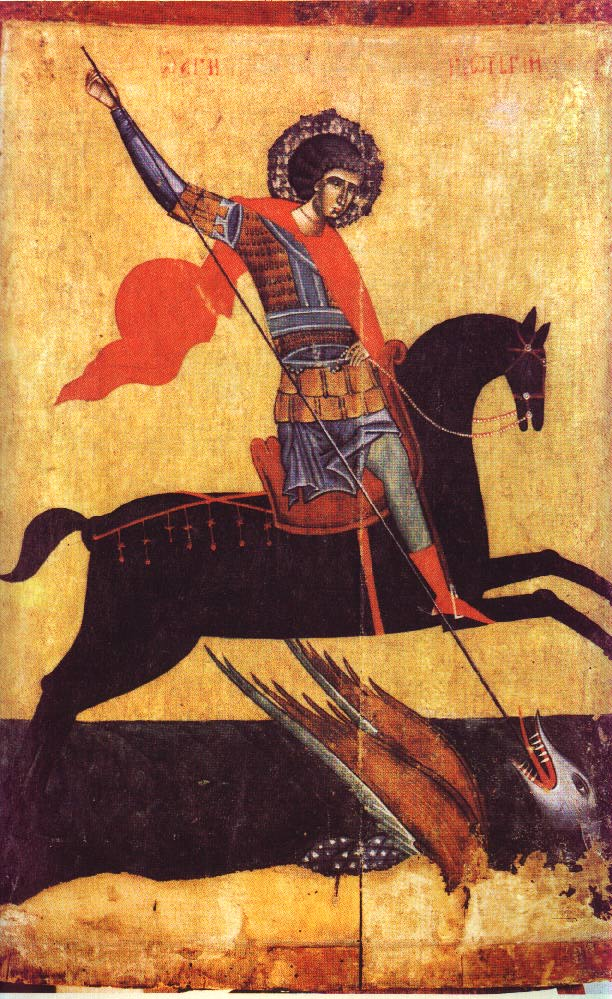

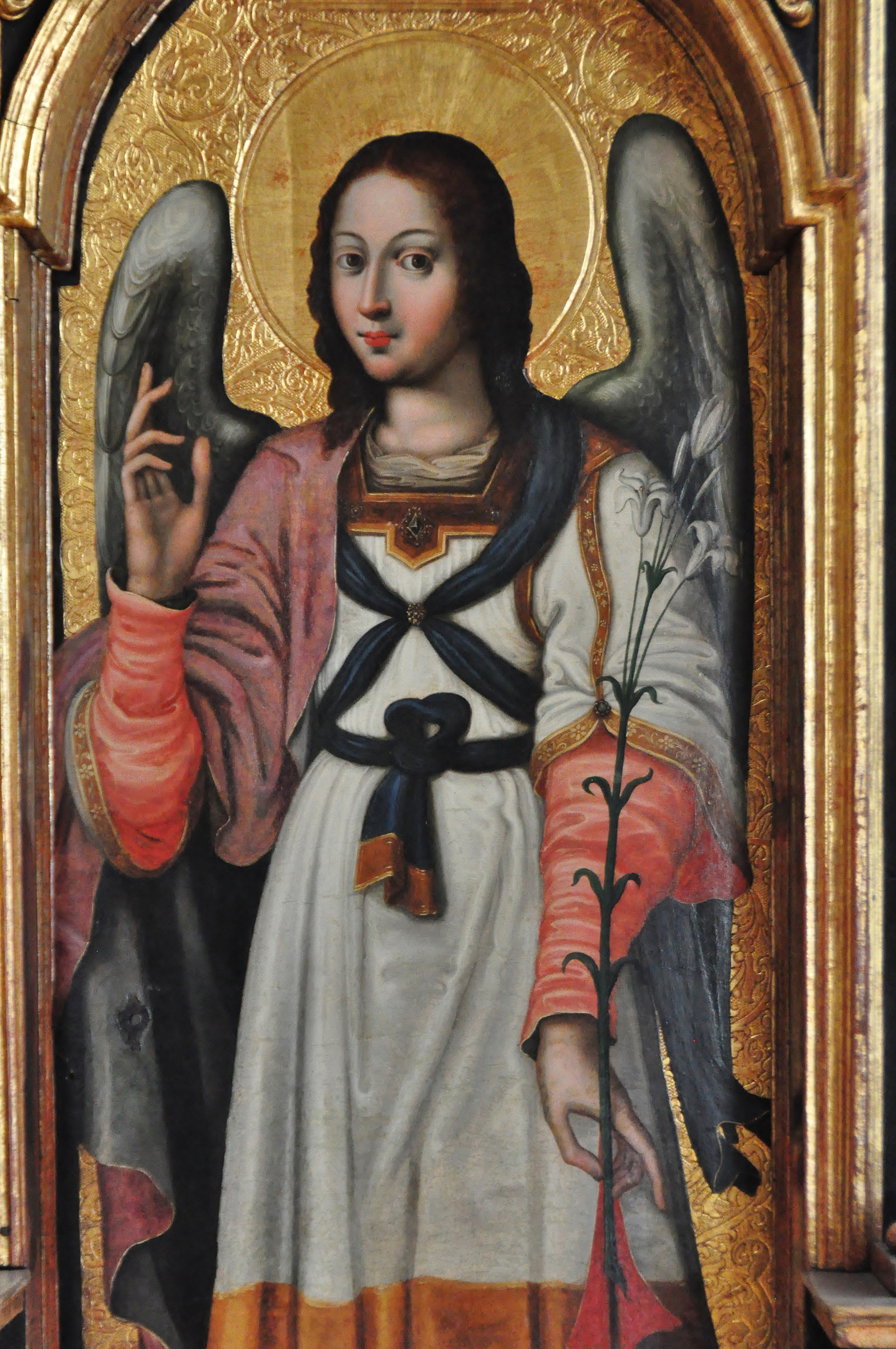

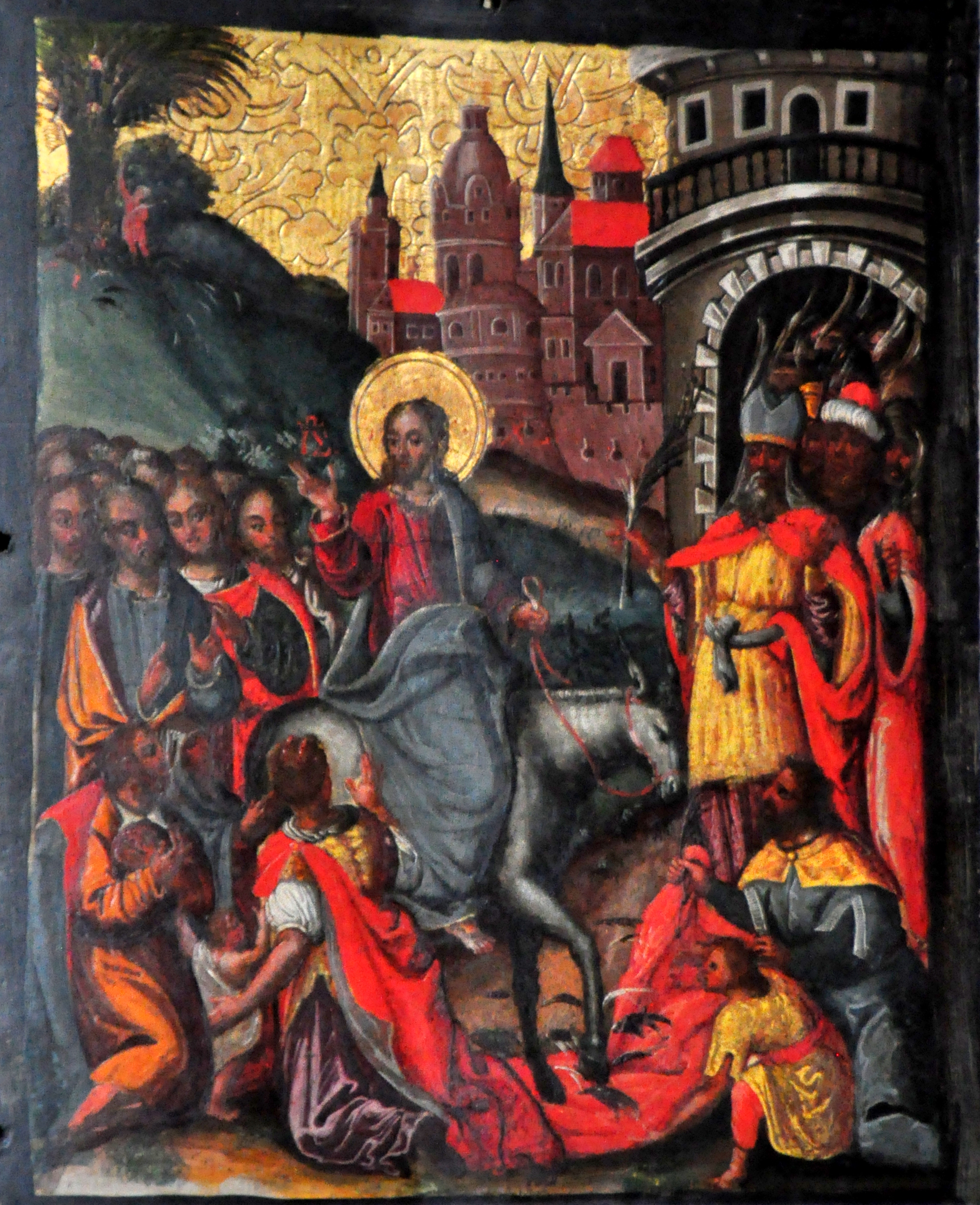

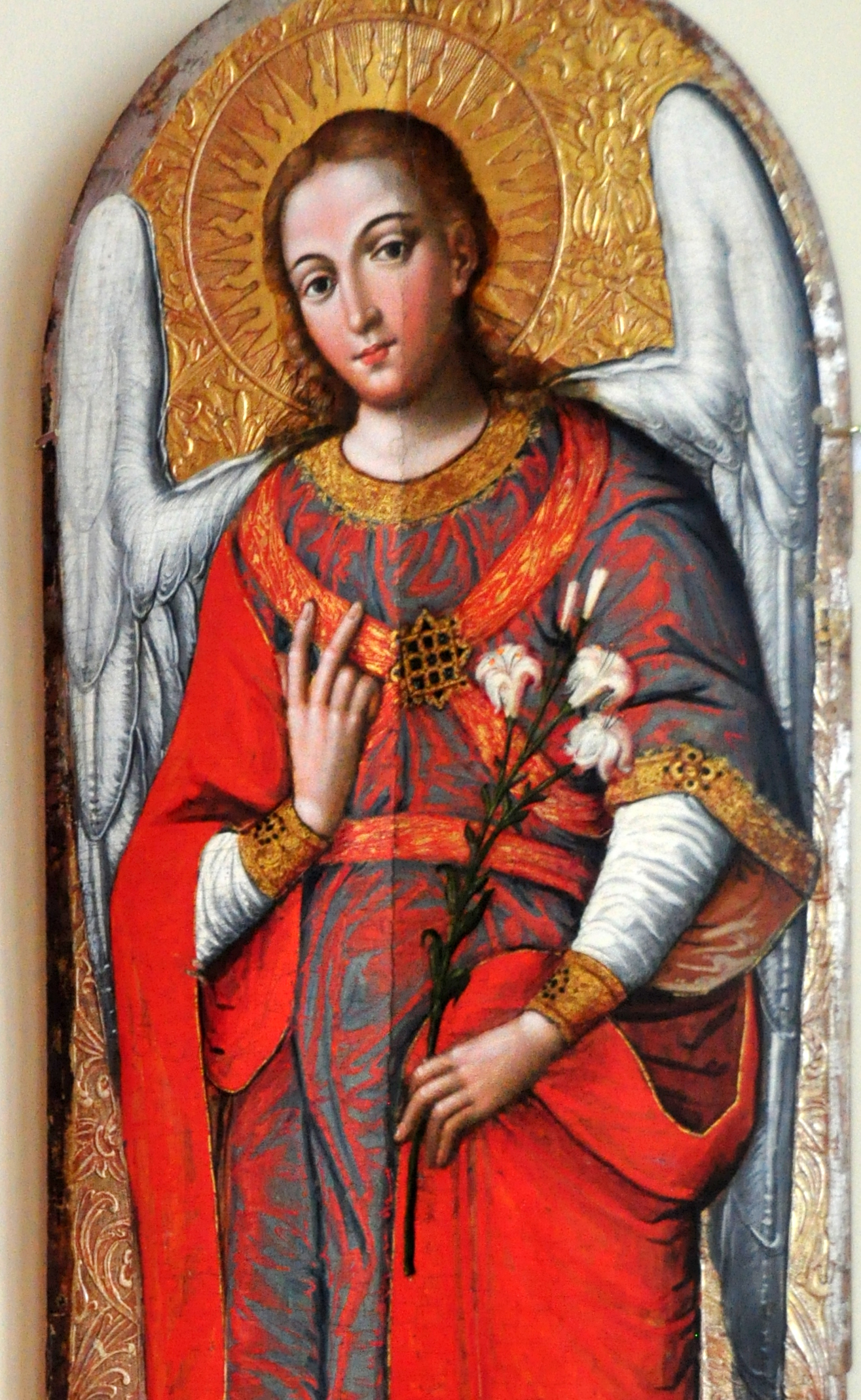

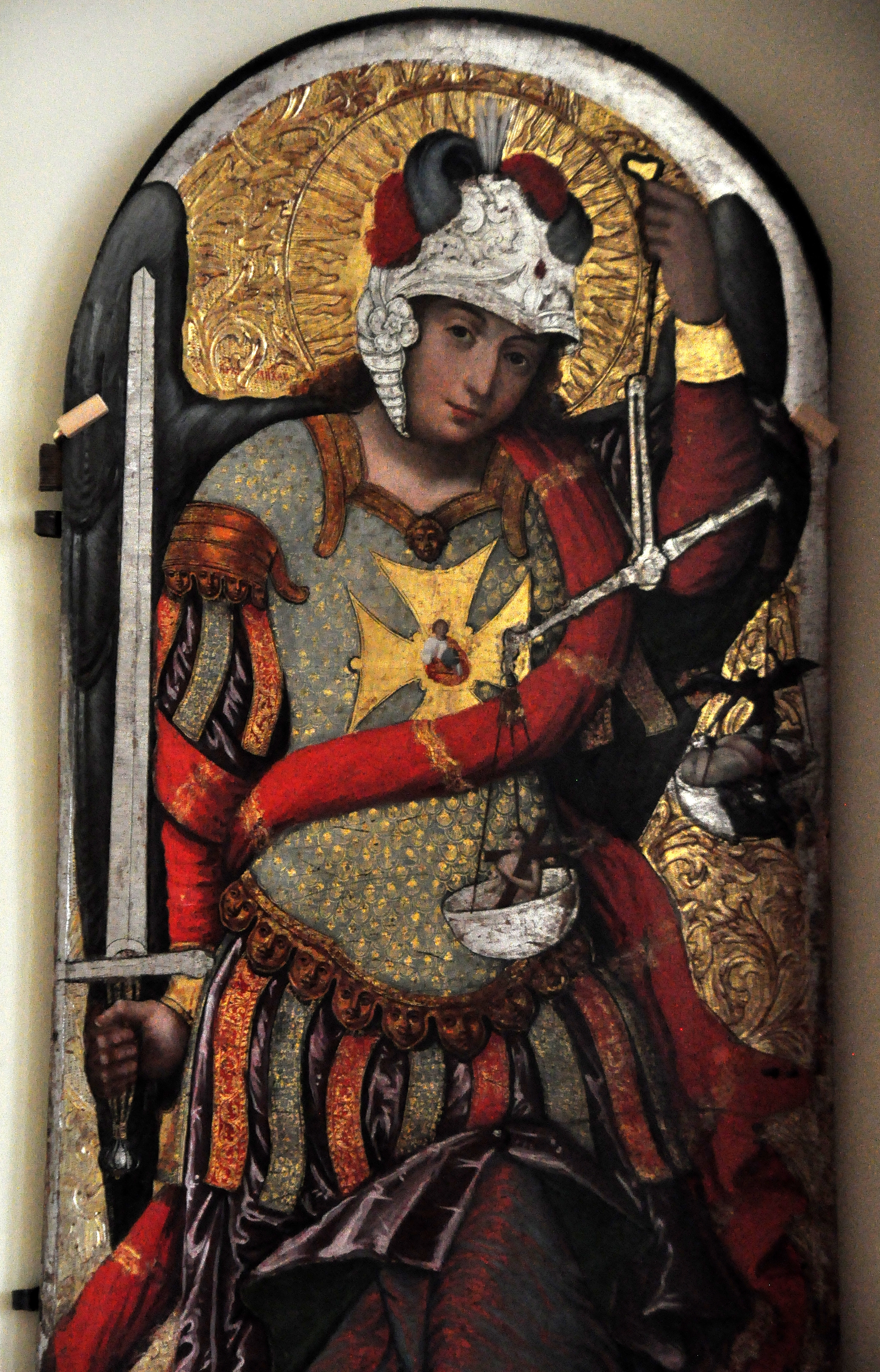

== See also ==
- Liubov Voloshyn
- Emiliia Okhrymovych-Holubovska
