= Olena Kulchytska =

Ukrainian painter (1877–1967)

People's Painter Olena Kulchytska
- Олена Львівна Кульчицька
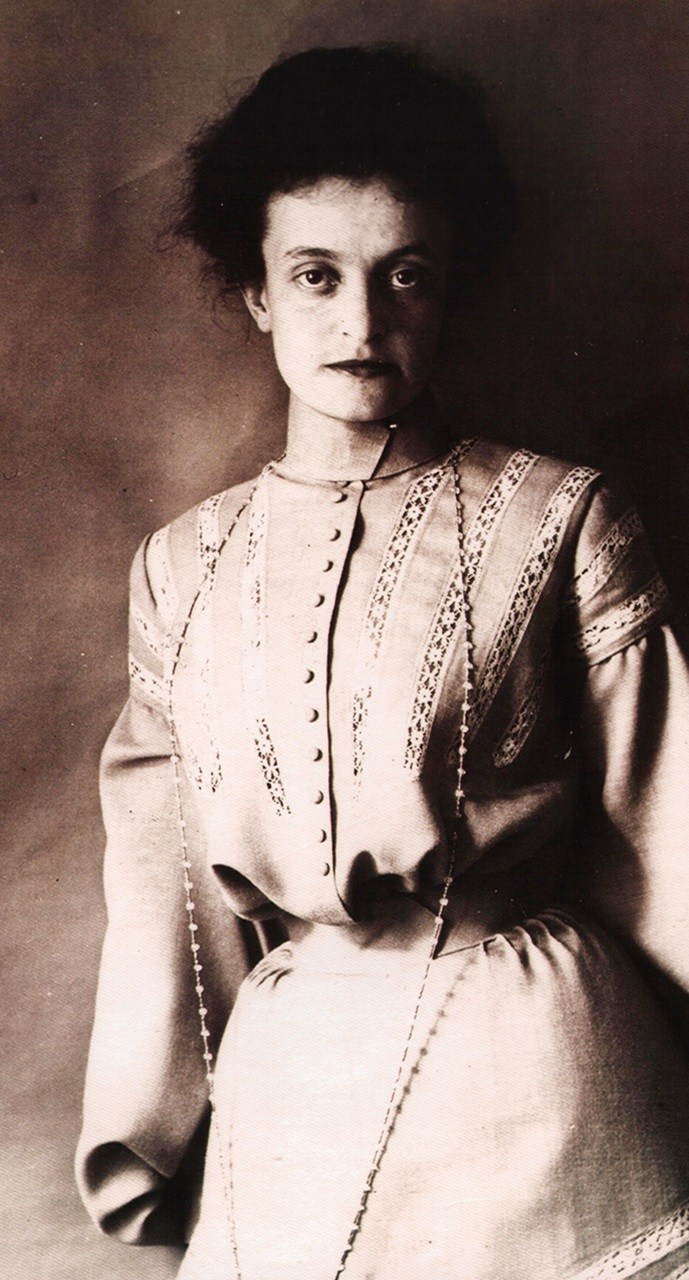
- Kulchytska in 1910
- Born: September 15, 1877; Berezhany, Galicia and Lodomeria, Austria-Hungary
- Died: March 8, 1967 (aged 89); Lviv, Ukrainian SSR, Soviet Union
- Resting place: Lychakiv Cemetery, Lviv
- Occupations: painter-illustrator, graphic artist, rug decorator, pedagogue
- Years active: 1900–1967
- Awards: Shevchenko National Prize

People's Deputy of the Ukrainian SSR
- In office 1951–1959
- Constituency: Lviv Oblast, Peremyshliany

Olena Lvivna Kulchytska (Ukrainian: Олена Львівна Кульчицька, Polish: Ołena Kulczyćka; 15 September 1877 – 8 March 1967) was a Ukrainian painter and politician who was a pioneer of Ukrainian children book illustration in western Ukraine.

== Biography ==
=== Family ===
Sas coat of arms

She was born in the town of Berezhany, in the Kingdom of Galicia and Lodomeria (today Ternopil Oblast, Ukraine). Her father was Lev Teodorovych Kulchytsky (1843 – December 4, 1909), a court counselor, lawyer, public figure, and member of many societies. Her mother was Maria Yakivna (? – December 29, 1939). Her family belonged to the Sas coat of arms and hailed out of place of Kulchytsi near Sambir. She had a sister Olha-Melania and a brother Volodymyr.

=== Learning and the first steps in art ===
In 1894 she graduated from an 8th grade school at the monastery in Lviv (convent of the Perpetual Adoration of the Blessed Sacrament). For several months between 1901 and 1902, she and her sister Olha attended the Lviv School of Arts and Crafts where she received her first lessons in watercolor.

Olena Kulchytska completed her art training at the private studio run by R. Bratkowski and S. Batowski-Kaczor in Lviv (1901–3) and the Vienna School of Industrial Design (1903–1908). After graduating, she took a year to travel through the major European art centres, including Munich, Paris, and London. Later in life, she worked as an art teacher at secondary schools in Lviv (Queen Jadwiga of Poland Gymnasium, 1909-1910) and Przemyśl girl school (1910–1938).

== Work ==
Kulchytska’s first solo exhibition took place in Lviv in 1909. It showcased her engravings, prints, watercolours, woodcuts, and filigrees. The exhibition was celebrated by the early-modernist Ukrainian artists, for instance, Ivan Trush. Kulchytska’s work combined the folk art traditions of the Western Ukraine, particularly, the Hutsuls, with the stylistic innovations of the European Secession. Later, she exhibited her works in Kraków, Warsaw, Poznań, Kyiv, and other European cities.

During 1920-1930, Kulchytska made major contribution to the Ukrainian book design. She illustrated various works by Ivan Franko, Mykhailo Kotsiubynsky, Vasyl Stefanyk, and Yurii Fedkovych, as well as more than 70 books for children for the series «For Our Littlest Ones», which included Oscar Wilde’s ‘The Star-Child’ (1920).

In the field of applied arts, she designed 80 kilims in collaboration with her sister Olha.

== Activism ==
During World War I, Kulchytska depicted the sufferings of the civilian population and refugees. Her works were reproduced as postcards by the Ukrainian Women's Committee to Aid Wounded Soldiers in Vienna.

Kulchytska was part of the civil resistance movement under Stalinism. She helped the families of those who were repressed and deported to Siberia.

In 1955, Kulchytska began campaigning against the closure of the Lviv Art College. She financially supported the Union for the Liberation of Ukraine.

== Legacy ==
Kulchytska donated a collection—including more than 3,000 pieces—of her own artwork to the Lviv Museum of Ukrainian Art in 1950. In 1971, a memorial museum of her work was posthumously opened in Lviv.

== Honours and awards ==
- People's Painter of Ukraine (1956)
- Shevchenko National Prize (1967)
- Order of the Red Banner of Labour

== See also ==
- Liubov Voloshyn
