= Alexis Gritchenko =

Ukrainian painter and art theorist

Alexis Gritchenko Ukrainian: Оле́кса Гри́щенко
- Alexis Gritchenko
- Born: Oleksa Hryshchenko; April 2, 1883; Krolevets, Chernihiv province, Russian Empire
- Died: January 28, 1977 (aged 93); Vence, France
- Education: Moscow Art School
- Known for: Expressionist Painter
- Spouse: Mile Lilas Lavelaine de Maubeuge

Alexis Gritchenko (Ukrainian: Оле́кса Гри́щенко; born April 2, 1883 – January 28, 1977) was a Ukrainian painter and art theorist.

== Biography ==
=== Education and early career ===
Gritchenko studied philology and biology at the universities of Kyiv, St Petersburg and Moscow before turning to art. He studied painting in Moscow and established close ties with the collectors Sergey Shchukin and Ivan Morozov. In 1911, he visited Paris where he became an enthusiast of modern art, especially Cubist painting. After a trip to Italy in 1913-14, he blended with his study of early Italian Renaissance painters, creating a style that brought together the cosmopolitan and urbane with the orthodoxy of the Byzantine legacy of sacred art. Gritchenko devoted his theoretical work to the subject of Byzantine art and its links with modern art, and to an analysis of the formal and stylistic properties of Byzantine painting in terms of modernist tendencies and practice. He published several books and articles, the most important of which were his studies on the icon in relation to Western art, and also took part in contemporary discussions on various aspects of modern art.

After the 1917 revolution, Gritchenko became a professor at the Free Art Studios (Svomas) in Moscow and a member of the Commission for the Preservation of Historic Monuments. In 1919, he was offered the directorship of the Tretyakov Gallery, but decided to leave Russia by way of Crimea to Constantinople, leaving all his paintings and other possessions behind in Moscow. This period marked a distinctive and inspired period of watercolour painting.

=== Emigration to France ===
In 1921, Gritchenko arrived in Paris, and twelve of his paintings of Constantinople were included in the Salon d'Automne, and Fernand Léger placed them next to his own works. A subsequent trip to Greece resulted in an exhibit at the Byzantine Museum in Athens. The art dealer Paul Guillaume introduced him to Leopold Zborovsky, another well-known Paris dealer. Dr. Albert Barnes acquired seventeen Gritchenko's paintings for his collection, now The Barnes Foundation in Philadelphia.

After 1924, Gritchenko lived in southern France. Gritchenko made frequent trips to Spain, Portugal, England and Scandinavian countries, and the paintings he brought from those visits were exhibited in several leading Paris galleries, such as Maison Bing, Granoff, Druet, De l`Elysse, Weil, and Bernheim-Jeune. Salons, especially the Salon des Tuileries and d`Automne, also exhibited his work. After an exhibition of Gritchenko's art at the Maison Bing in 1926, Louis Vauxcelles wrote about him, saying, "the young Ukrainian colorist conquered Paris." In 1937, a one-man exhibition with Gritchenko's works was held at the Museum of Ukrainian Art in Lviv, then under Polish rule, where his first Ukrainian-French monograph appeared.

== Legacy ==
To preserve Gritchenko's artistic legacy, the Alexis Gritchenko Foundation was formed in New York City in 1958. After the foundation was formed, Gritchenko held three more exhibits in New York and Philadelphia, the last in 1967 at the Peter Deitsch Gallery in New York. At the beginning of the sixties it was discovered that his paintings which had been in the collections of the Ukrainian Lviv Museum were destroyed as creations of "bourgeois formalism", together with works of Alexander Archipenko, Mikhail Boichuk and Heorhiy Narbut. This caused Gritchenko to bequeath a collection of seventy works including oils, watercolors and drawings, to the Alexis Gritchenko Foundation, with the provision that they be transferred some day to the museums of a free Ukraine. The foundation and the collection were held by the Ukrainian Institute of America (UIA)

On March 26, 2006, a ceremony was held to formally transfer the Gritchenko Foundation collection to the National Art Museum of Ukraine. In addition to the 70 works of art, books, catalogues, handwritten notes and memoirs, and other archival material were included.

Today, Gritchenko's art work can be found in various museum and private collections, more than three hundred of them in the United States and Canada.

== Books and articles ==
- Russian: «О связях русской живописи с Византией и Западом. XIII–XX вв.» 1913 ("On the links of Russian painting with Byzantium and the West". Мысли живописца. Москва, 1913)
- Russian: «Русская икона как искусство живописи» 1917 («The Russian icon as a pictorial art» // Вопросы живописи. Вып. 3. М., 1917)
- Ukrainian: «Україна моїх блакитних днів» (Ukraine of my blue days)
- Ukrainian: «Два роки в Константинополі» (Two years in Constantinople)
- Ukrainian: «Мої зустрічі з французькими митцями» (My meeting with French artists)
- Ukrainian: «Роки бурі і натиску» (Years of Sturm und Drang)
- French: "Deux ans à Constantinople - Journal d'un peintre." Paris, Éditions Quatre Vents, 1930.
- О группе художников «Бубновый валет» // Аполлон. 1913. № 6. С. 31–38.
- Ответ С. Глаголю, А. Луначарскому и Я. Тугендхольду // Вопросы живописи. Вып. 1. М., 1915.
- Как у нас преподают живопись, и что под нею надо разуметь // Вопросы живописи. Вып. 2. М., 1915.
- Кризис искусства и современная живопись: По поводу лекции Н. Бердяева // Вопросы живописи. Вып. 4. М., 1917.
- О влиянии немецкой культуры и искусства на русских художников: Что такое графика, что такое живопись // Вопросы искусства. Вып. 5. М., 1917.
- Народная картина-лубок // Путь освобождения. 1917. 20 авг. (№ 3). С. 15–19.
- Совместно с А.В. Шевченко: «Поиски и достижения в области станковой живописи». Москва, 1919.
- Совместно с А.В. Шевченко. Цветодинамос и тектонический примитивизм (манифест) // Каталог двенадцатой государственной выставки «Цветодинамос и тектонический примитивизм». Москва, 1919.

== Bibliography ==
- René-Jean et Paul Fierens, Alexis Gritchenko, Paris, Les Quatre Vents, 1948
- Collected by Sylvie Maignan et Jean Bergeron, "Alexis Gritchenko; Lettres a Rene-Jean", Paris, L'Harmattan, 2014
- Тугендхольд Яков. Pro Doma Nostra // Аполлон. 1915. № 2. С. 78–79.
- Лопатин Б. А. Грищенко. Вопросы живописи // День. 1915. 15 окт.
- Moзалевський I. Артист-маляр О. Грищенко // Украïнськi вiстi (Париж). 1927. № 18. С. 3.
- Moзалевський I. Украïнськi артисти на паризьких виставках: (О. Грищенко) // Украïнськi вiстi. 1927. № 33. С. 3.
- Ковжун П. Олекса Грищенко. Львiв, 1934
- Vita Susak. Ukrainian Artists in Paris. 1900-1939. Kyiv, Rodovid Editions, 2010.
- Сусак Вита. Наследие А. Грищенко // Творчество. 1992. № 2.
- Сусак Вита. Цареградские акварели Алексея Грищенко // Пинакотека (Москва). 1999. № 8–9.
- Сусак Вита. «Цветодинамос» Алексея Грищенко // Русский кубофутуризм. СПб., 2002.
- Черняков Б.І. Олекса Грищенко в пам’яті Кролевця: Листи Михайла Коцюбинського з приватного архіву; Біобібліографія / Академія наук вищої школи України, Відділення масової комунікації. – Київ., 2004. (Кролевець і Кролевеччина; Вип. 3).
- A. Gritchenko. Painting. 1920–1958: [Catalogue]. New York, 1958.
- A. Gritchenko. Rétrospective. 1920–1960: [Catalogue]. Cagnes, 1960.
- Alexis Gritchenko. Sa vie, son œuvre / Textes de R. Charmet, P. Fierens, J. Devoluy, S. Hordinsky, M. Phillips. Paris: Quatre Vents, 1964.
- А. Gritchenko. 1883–1977: [Catalogue]. Focus Gallery. Toronto, 1977.
- Alexis Gritchenko. Deux ans à Constantinople: Avec 40 aquarelles de l’auteur. Paris, 1930.
- Alexis Gritchenko. L’Ukraine de mes jours bleus. La Colombe, 1957 (на укр. яз. – Мюнхен, 1958).
- Олекса Грищенко. Моi роки в Царгородi. 1919–1920–1921. Мюнхен; Париж, 1961 (на укр. яз.).
- Олекса Грищенко. Мої зустрічі та розмови з французькими художниками. Нью-Йорк, 1964
