= Zalissia =

Zalissia (Ukrainian: Залісся) is a name of several populated places in Ukraine:

Lviv Oblast:

- Zalissia, Lviv Oblast
- Zalissia, Zolochiv Raion, Lviv Oblast

Ternopil Oblast:

- Zalissia, Monastyryska urban hromada, Chortkiv Raion, Ternopil Oblast
- Zalissia, Ivane-Puste rural hromada, Chortkiv Raion, Ternopil Oblast
- Zalissia, Ternopil Raion, Ternopil Oblast
- Zalissia, Zavodske settlement hromada, Chortkiv Raion, Ternopil Oblast
