= Church of the Dormition, Pylypche, Ternopil Oblast =

Greek Catholic church in Pylypche, Ukraine

Church of the Dormition Церква Успіння Пресвятої Богородиці
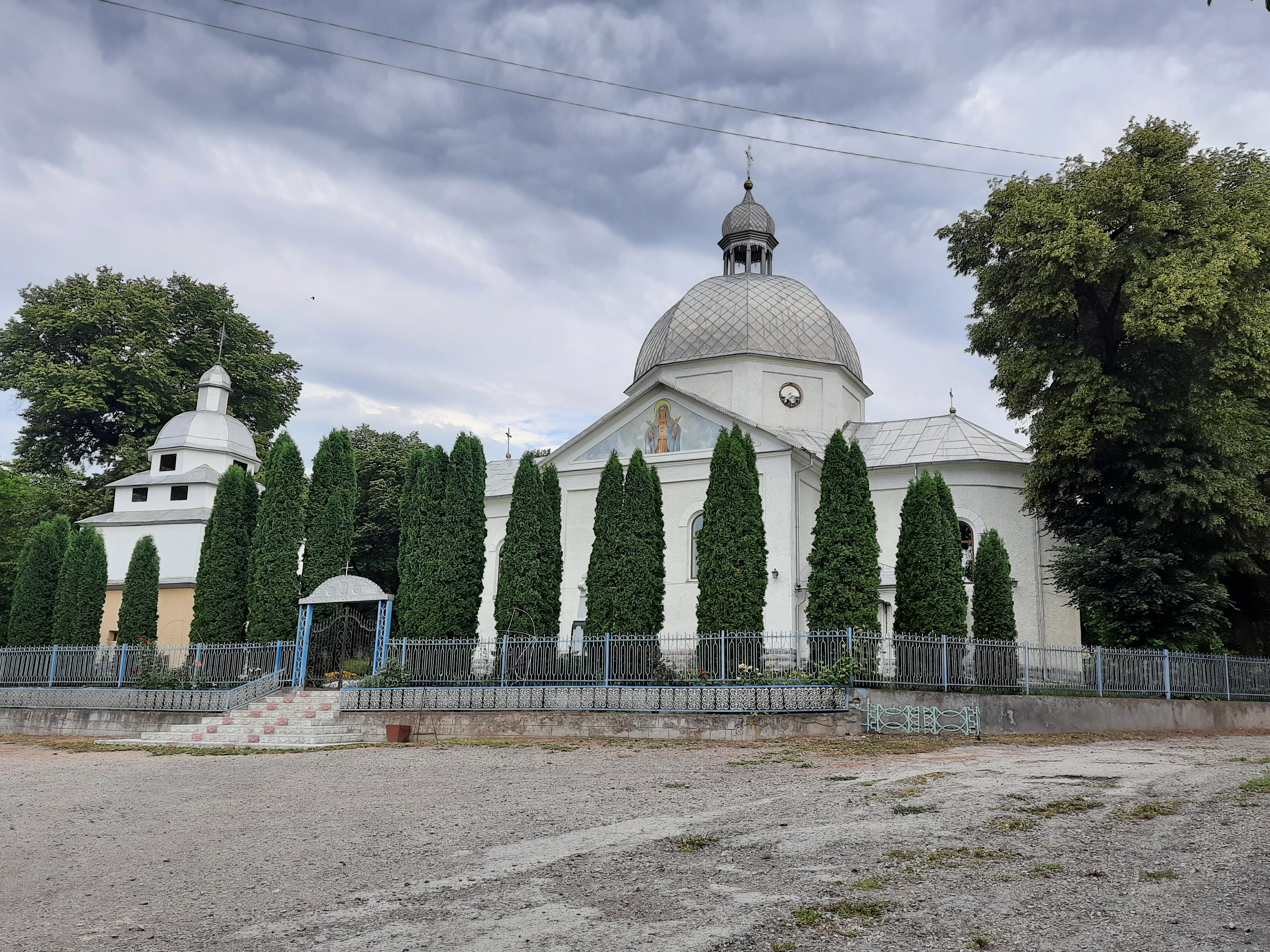

Religion
- Affiliation: Ukrainian Greek Catholic Church

Location
- Location: Pylypche, Ivane-Puste rural hromada, Chortkiv Raion, Ternopil Oblast, Ukraine
- Interactive map of Church of the Dormition; Церква Успіння Пресвятої Богородиці
- Coordinates: 48°38′22″N 26°05′04″E

Architecture
- Completed: 1907

Church of the Dormition (Ukrainian: Церква Успіння Пресвятої Богородиці) is a Greek Catholic parish church (UGCC) in Pylypche of the Ivane-Puste rural hromada of the Chortkiv Raion of the Ternopil Oblast, and an architectural monument of local importance.

== History ==
The stone church in the village of Pylypche was built in 1907 on the site of an old cemetery. The initiator of the construction and the main benefactor was a village resident, Dmytro Kubei. The old wooden church was dismantled.

In 1911–1912, the church's decoration was performed by the artist Mykhailo Shurma.

Until 1946, the community was Greek Catholic, and from 1946 to 1964, it belonged to the ROC.

From 1964 to 1988, the church was closed by state authorities. During this period, the faithful attended services in neighboring villages.

In 1988, the church was reopened under the subordination of the ROC. Repairs were carried out by the community, with the support of the local collective farm. The wooden iconostasis was painted by Yakiv Hnizdovskyi (the nephew of the well-known artist Jacques Hnizdovsky), who was assisted by Roman Stratiichuk.

In 1991, the parish returned to the fold of the UGCC. The first episcopal visitation was conducted by Bishop Mykhailo Sabryha.

On 6 August 2007, the 100th anniversary of the church was celebrated. On this occasion, Bishop Iryney Bilyk arrived for a visitation and consecrated an oak cross near the church.

On 10 March 2012, His Beatitude Lubomyr Husar visited the village on a private visit. He visited the school museum of Jakob Hnizdovskyi, and then served a memorial service in the church for the repose of his soul.

The Mothers' Prayers community operates at the parish. The parish owns the church, a bell tower, a chapel, and a rectory.

== Priests ==
- at. Hryhorovych,
- at. Ivan Ustianovych,
- at. Dmytro Palianytsia,
- at. Roman Tychynskyi,
- at. Hordiichuk,
- at. Hunchak,
- at. Ostap Havryliv (ROC),
- at. Hryhorii Drebit,
- at. Oleh Kosovan,
- at. Vasyl Stasiv,
- at. Valerii Kandiuk,
- at. Yaroslav Manchulenko,
- at. Andrii Senyshyn (since 3 February 2007).
