= Lys Mykyta =

Lys Mykyta may refer to:

- Lys Mykyta (magazine), a Ukrainian-language satirical and humorous magazine
- Lys Mykyta (book), an 1890 children's book by Ivan Franko
