= Ivane-Puste =

Rural locality in Ternopil Oblast, Ukraine

Ivane-Puste Іване-Пусте
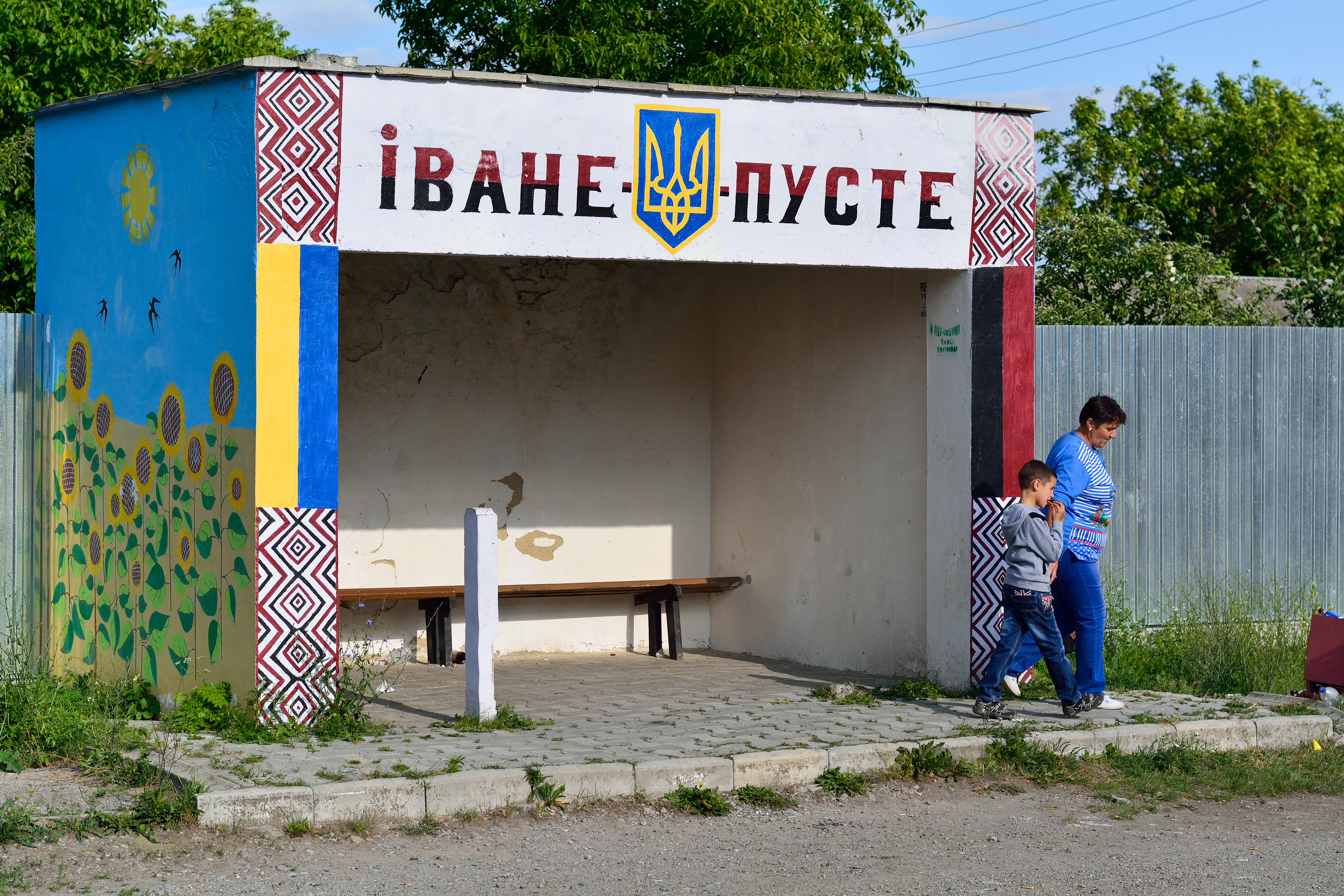
- A bus stop near Ivane-Puste

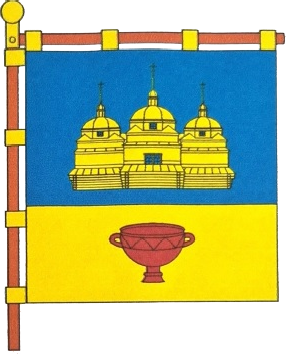
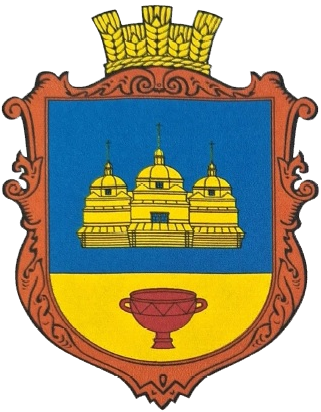
- Flag Coat of arms

- Location in Ternopil Oblast
- Coordinates: 48°38′41″N 26°11′14″E
- Country: Ukraine
- Oblast: Ternopil Oblast
- Raion: Chortkiv Raion
- Hromada: Ivane-Puste Hromada

Government
  - Head: Mariia Skaliak
- Time zone: UTC+2 (EET)
  - Summer (DST): UTC+3 (EEST)
- Postal code: 48748

Ivane-Puste (Ukrainian: Іване-Пусте) is a village that is located in the Ivane-Puste rural hromada, Chortkiv Raion, Ternopil Oblast, Ukraine.

== History ==
It is known in written sources from 1549.

== Religion ==
- Saint John the Baptist church (1763, wooden; since 1997 – brick, painted by Ternopil artists Y. Burda and S. Mamchur)

== Notable people ==
- Ioann Bodnarchuk (1927-1994), Ukrainian Orthodox hierarch (UAOC, UOC-KP).
