= Marcel Anselme =

French painter and engraver (1925–1982)

- Born: 1925; Bourgoin
- Died: 1982 (aged 56–57); Bourgoin-Jallieu

Marcel Anselme (1925–1982) was a French painter and engraver, and held the position of official portrait painter for Archbishop Makarios of Cyprus for several years.

In 1948, he met Léon Garraud, a master of the Lyon School and attended his workshop. In 1962, Anselm met Nicos Dikheos, Consul of Cyprus in Lyon. The diplomat was struck by the talent of the young painter and introduced him to Archbishop Makarios, President of the Republic of Cyprus. For ten years, Anselm regularly visited the Cypriot capital of Nicosia where he was entrusted to paint the portraits of the archbishops. During this time he developed his abilities, studying the works of Dutch, Italian Renaissance, Florentine and Venetian painters.

He painted nudes, landscapes and everyday scenes, but he excelled in portraiture. Marcel Anselm also made many portraits at the request of political, scientific and religious personalities throughout the world. The St. Francis Gallery, Lyon in 1963 and the Ror Volmar Gallery in Paris honored Anselme in 1977 with multiple exhibitions. Les Amis de la Maison Ravier held a retrospective exhibition of his work during September and October 1992, showing fifty paintings in which 'this tormented artist sought perfection in his expression".

== Bibliography ==
- Thiolier, Hubert: Ravier et les peintres lyonnais : 1850-1950 : Guiguet et Garraud / Hubert Thiolier, 1984, Lyon, Impr. des Beaux-Arts, 206 p. (in French)

== External sources ==
- Rétrospective Marcel ANSELME Maison RAVIER – Morestel (Isère 38), Imprimé à l’Imprimerie des Beaux-arts TIXIER et Fils à LYON (tirage en 500 exemplaires)
- Catalogue d’Exposition Marcel ANSELME du 23 Novembre au 7 Décembre 1963 à la galerie St FRANÇOIS 24, rue Auguste-Comte, Lyon (2ème)
- La revue Moderne, Des Arts et de la Vie – publication Mensuelle Août 1960
- La revue Moderne, Des Arts et de la Vie – publication Mensuelle Décembre 1977
- La revue Moderne, Des Arts et de la Vie – publication Mensuelle Juin 1979 (Page 3)
