= Liuboslav Hutsaliuk =

Ukrainian-American artist (1923–2003)

- Born: April 2, 1923; Lviv, Second Polish Republic (now Ukraine)
- Died: December 16, 2003 (aged 80); New York City, New York, US
- Education: The Cooper Union School of Art
- Known for: Painting
- Notable work: City in the Sun (1957)
- Movement: Neo-impressionism

Liuboslav Hutsaliuk (Note: first name also variously spelled Lubomyr, Luboslau, Ljuboslav, or shortened to Lubo and surname also spelled Hucaljuk) (2 April 1923 – 16 December 2003) was a Ukrainian American painter, graphic artist, cartoonist and caricaturist. Along with Edward Kozak, Mykola Butovych and Mykhailo Moroz, Hutsaliuk was cited in 1972 as amongst the best known of Ukrainian painters living in the United States, and mentioned as "becoming increasingly popular". In 1982, he was again mentioned as one of Ukraine's "first rate artists" living in the United States. He was best known for his "neo-impressionist oil paintings of cityscapes, landscapes and still lifes."

== Biography ==
Hutsaliuk was born in Lviv, Poland, on April 2, 1923. He joined the Galicia (Halychyna) SS Division and fought in World War II; wounded in action, he was moved to various displaced persons camps after the war had finished. In 1946, Hutsaliuk moved to Munich, where he began his artistic training under Kozak in Berchtesgaden. He studied under Kozak until 1949 when he emigrated to the United States with Kozak and settled in New York City where he was associated with Kozak for many years. Early on, he became a United States citizen. He married Renata Kozicky in 1951, and they had a son, Yarema. Hutsaliuk enrolled at the Cooper Union School of Art, graduating in 1954 and pursued further studies at the Campanella Academy in Rome, which gave him the silver medal in 1970.

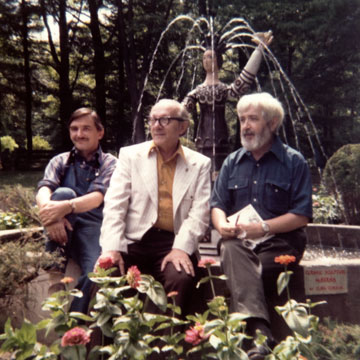
Hutsaliuk (left), with Edward Kozak and Jacques Hnizdovsky in the 1960s.

From 1955, Hutsaliuk began splitting his time between New York, and his tranquil and airy studio in Paris at Rue de Vaugirard 103. The following year, in 1956, Hutsaliuk held his first major exhibition at the Galerie Ror Volmar in Paris. The Encyclopedia of Ukraine cites his 1957 oil painting City in the Sun to be of note from this period. Hutsaliuk produced many watercolor paintings and many drawings which he showcased throughout the United States and beyond but was best known for his "neo-impressionist oil paintings of cityscapes, landscapes and still lifes." His work was displayed in many one man shows in galleries in major cities such as Milan and Toronto, in addition to New York and Paris.

He garnered critical acclaim in numerous artistic publications in these cities for his urban landscape paintings, painting with a "bold and aggressive impasto technique and a lyric color." Le Hors-Cote said of Hutsaliuk in 1959, "This urban landscape artist seems to inlay his colors into the canvas to give us cityscapes that haunt us with their new faces." In the 1960s, with Kozak, Hutsaliuk became associated with the Soyuzivka, a Ukrainian American artistic centre in New York City. Hutsaliiuk was also a talented cartoonist and caricaturist, and his drawings often appeared in the noted satirical journal Lys Mykyta. As a graphic artist, he did design work for Sunshine Biscuits. He published art reviews in the daily newspaper Svoboda and the artistic journal Suchasnist. The bulk of his works can be found in art collections in France, the United Kingdom, Italy, Canada, as well as the Palm Springs Desert Museum and Vermont Arts Center in United States.

Hutsaliuk was described as a "tall and powerfully built man". In 1990, he suffered a stroke, but eventually recovered and continued to paint and showcase his works in exhibitions; the last sole exhibition of note was "Five Decades" in 1999 at the Ukrainian Institute of America. The Ukrainian Weekly spoke highly of Hutsaliuk's "enchanting oil paintings, gouaches and watercolors of French landscapes and florals". In the late 1990s and early 2000s, he was a contributor to the Josyf Slipyj Memorial Museum of the Lviv Theological Academy in his native Lviv, along with numerous other emigre Ukrainian artists.

With Butovich, Kozak, Moroz, as well as Jacques Hnizdovsky and Sviatoslav Hordynsky, Hutsaliuk was considered a notable Ukrainian-American artist. He was a member of The New York Group, Audubon Artists, Société des Artistes Indépendants, and the Ukrainian Association in the United States. He died on 16 December 2003, and he was buried at St. Andrew's Ukrainian Orthodox Cemetery in South Bound Brook, New Jersey on 23 December in a funeral attended by many notable Ukrainians living in the states and of the Halychyna Division.
