= Soyuzivka =

Ukrainian cultural center in Wawarsing, New York, US

Coordinates: 41.758697°N 74.312285°W

Soyuzivka Heritage Center
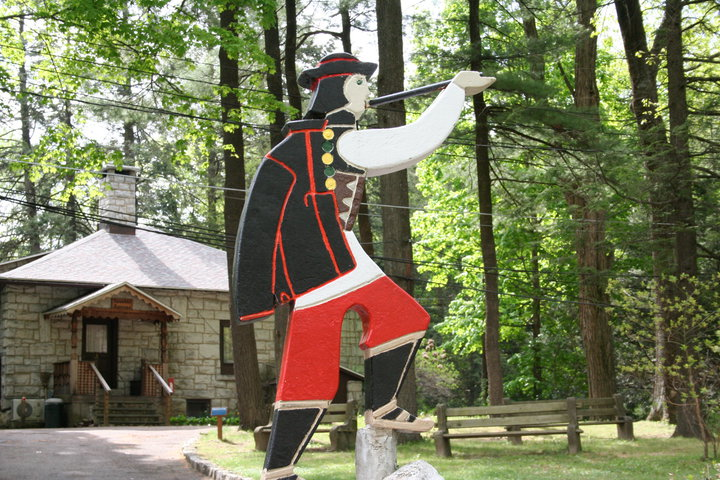
- Formation: 1952
- Type: NGO
- Legal status: Active
- Purpose: Cultural
- Location: Wawarsing, Ulster County; Kerhonkson, New York
- Region served: Canada, United States of America
- Official language: English, Ukrainian
- Parent organization: Ukrainian National Foundation
- Website: Soyuzivka website

Soyuzivka Heritage Center (Ukrainian: Союзівка), also known as Soyuzivka, Suzi-Q, or the Q, is a Ukrainian cultural center located in the hamlet of Kerhonkson, New York, in Ulster County, in the Shawangunk Ridge area south of the Catskill Mountains. Soyuzivka hosts children's heritage camps, Ukrainian dance camps, workshops, seminars, festivals, concerts, dance recitals and art exhibits for those interested in learning about Ukraine and its culture.

Soyuzivka's mission is to promote, preserve and share Ukrainian culture. With its programs, Soyuzivka aims to instill pride in Ukrainian heritage among Ukrainian North American youth and to showcase Ukrainian culture to a North American audience.

== History ==
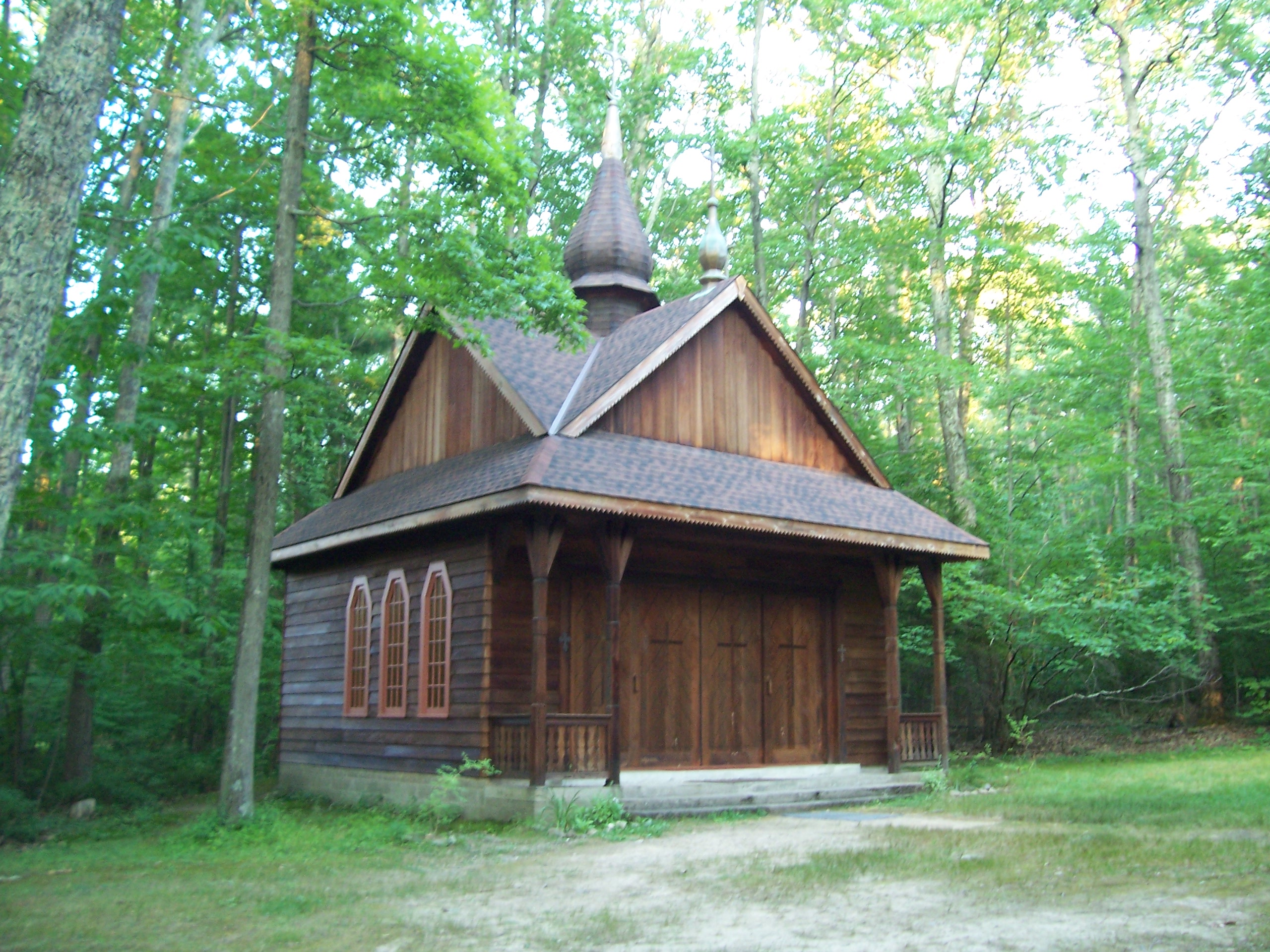
Soyuzivka Chapel, demonstrating unique architecture

In 1952, the Ukrainian National Association, a fraternal organization established in 1894, purchased the property in response to the need of its growing Ukrainian community for a cultural center. Soyuzivka provided language workshops, heritage studies, festivals, concerts, dances, art exhibits and children's summer camps. It has been providing this service for over 50 years.

Soyuzivka thrived under the leadership of Walter Kwas, a great supporter of the arts, who dedicated his entire life to bettering the center, and was the person responsible for inviting fine artists, musicians and dancers to exhibit, hold recitals and workshops at the resort during the summer months and holidays.

Kwas modeled the resort after the architecture of the Carpathian mountains, with the famous woodcarver, Cherniovsky, embellishing the individual buildings that made up the premises. Each of these buildings was named after a city or region in Ukraine.

== Activities ==
=== Artists ===
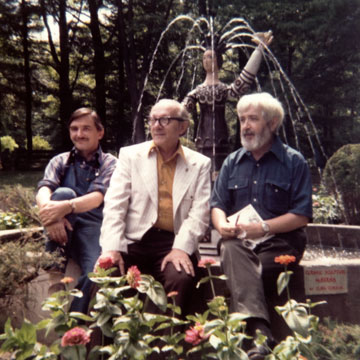
Ukrainian artists Liuboslav Hutsaliuk, Edward Kozak and Jacques Hnizdovsky in front of Slava Gerulak's "Mayana" fountain at Soyuzivka

Many artists exhibited there over the years, including Slava Gerulak, Jacques Hnizdovsky, Liuboslav Hutsaliuk, Edward Kozak, Halyna Mazepa and others. Soyuzivka is home to many important works of art by the most famous of Ukrainian sculptors, who were commissioned to provide busts of the most famous Ukrainian literary, historic, political and religious figures. These include the busts of Lesia Ukrainka, poet; Taras Shevchenko, poet; Cardinal Josyf Slipyj, leader of the Ukrainian Catholic Church; the Rev. Hryhoriy Hrushka, the founding editor of Svoboda, the oldest continuously published Ukrainian-language newspaper in the US (established in 1893); and Hetman Ivan Mazepa, the legendary leader of Ukraine in the 17th century. The most notable statue is that of Taras Shevchenko, donated by Alexander Archipenko. Edward Kozak's relief paintings of Ukrainian dancers adorn the Veselka Hall, where exhibitions and recitals are held.

Montreal-based recording artists Rushnychok became a major draw for concerts and dances during summers in the mid-1970s. More recently, noted performing artists have visited Soyuzivka, including Vitaly Kozlovsky in 2008 and Ruslana in 2009, who performed during annual Ukrainian Cultural Festivals. Ruslana returned to Soyuzivka amid heavy unrest in Ukraine on July 10 and 11, 2014. Haydamaky appeared in 2010 and Maria Burmaka in 2011. Peter Yarrow, of Peter, Paul and Mary fame, was a special guest at the festival, performing with Ukrainian folk singer Maria Burmaka.

=== Dance ===
Soyuzivka is home to the Roma Pryma Dance Academy, a lasting legacy of choreographer Roma Pryma-Bohachevsky whose summer camps continue to this day. The Syzokryli Ukrainian Dance Ensemble organizes intensive dance camps and workshops for six weeks of instruction in total. The camps satisfy all levels of amateur Ukrainian folk dance. The first two weeks are a "Workshop" for advanced teens and young adults and the following four weeks are two-week sessions of "Dance Camp" geared towards all levels. Over 400 children participate annually in this program. The most advanced dancers are featured (after the completion of a two-week intensive Dance Workshop) at Soyuzivka's annual cultural festival. Actress Vera Farmiga spent many summers at Soyuzivka, as a participant in the dance camps and workshops.

=== Education ===
Courses for teachers in Ukrainian-language schools have been offered since at least the 1980s. These are two-week intensive certification programs for teaching the Ukrainian language, as well as its history, culture and literature.

Since the 1990s, offerings have included Ukrainian cultural courses, including language immersion, and heritage camps for English speakers.

=== Sports ===
Soyuzivka's facilities include a hockey rink, soccer field, swimming pools, tennis courts, and volleyball courts. The center partners with Chornomorska Sitch, a Ukrainian-American sports organization, to provide sports camps for children of Ukrainian descent. Ukrainian heritage and language are also emphasized in all the programs.

== Partnership ==
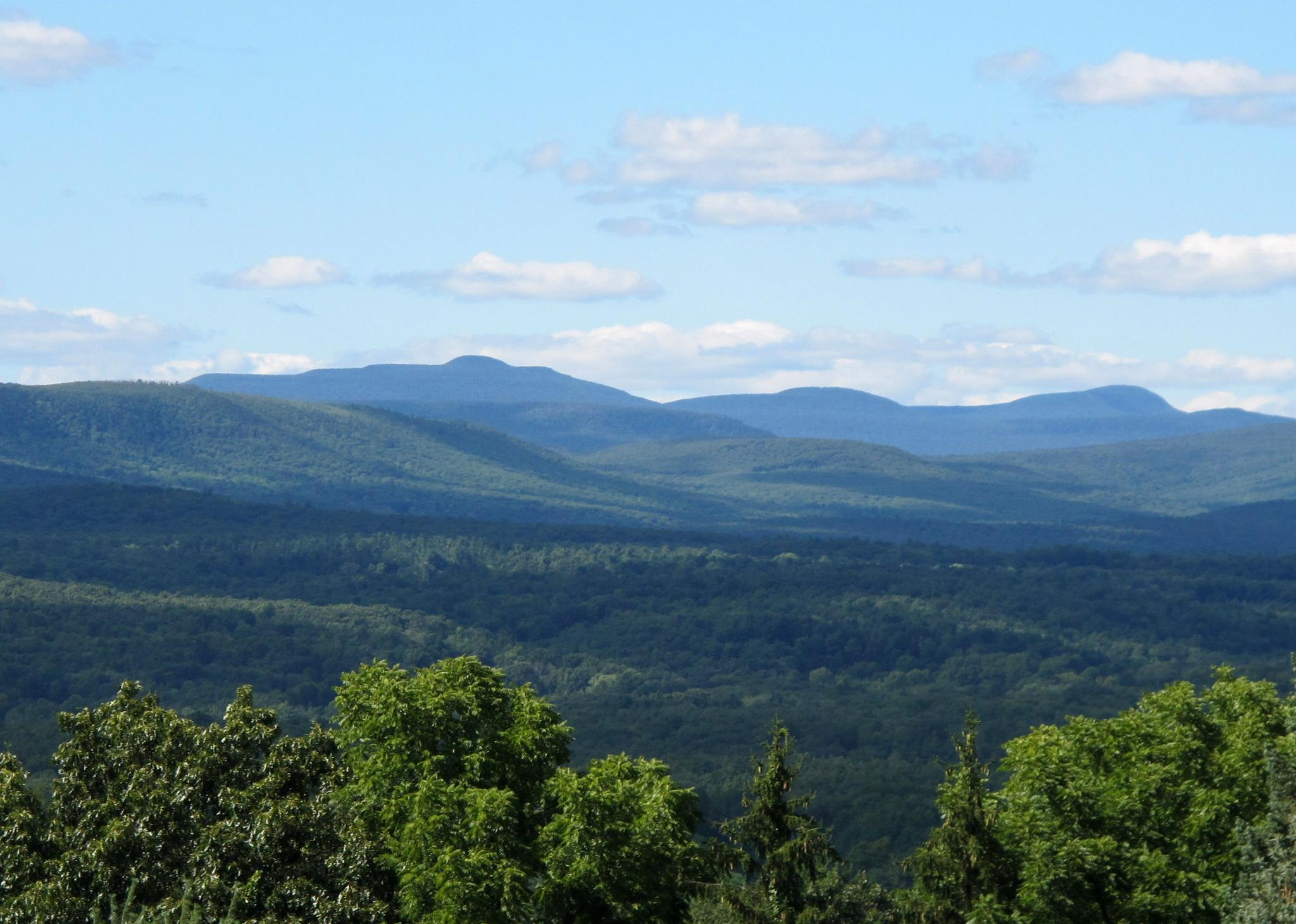
A view of the Catskill Mountains from Soyuzivka Ukrainian Resort in Kerhonkson.

In joint partnership with Ukraine's embassy in Washington D.C., a workshop is offered to families who have adopted children from Ukraine. The programs seeks to address the problems these children may have integrating into American culture and help these parents have a greater understanding of the culture of their new children.

== Venue ==
Soyuzivka is also a venue that is used frequently by various Ukrainian organizations for conventions and reunions, such as the Ukrainian American Veterans and the Ukrainian National Women's League of America. Soyuzivka has always been host to important dignitaries of Ukrainian descent. Cardinal Josyf Slipyj was honored during his first US visit, after his release from a Soviet prison, right after the Pope nominated him Cardinal. Soyuzivka also hosted the first president of an independent Ukraine, President Leonid Kravchuk in 1992. During the 1980s, 1990s and more recently, leaders and political dissidents, championing the rights of Ukraine's self-determination, were asked to lecture and meet with the community. These included Valentyn Moroz (dissident), Mykola Horyn, Taras Chornovil and others.

Well-known guests that visited and attended benefits at the resort are Jack Palance, Mike Mazurki, Miss USA and others.
