= Pylypche, Ternopil Oblast =

Pylypche Пилипче
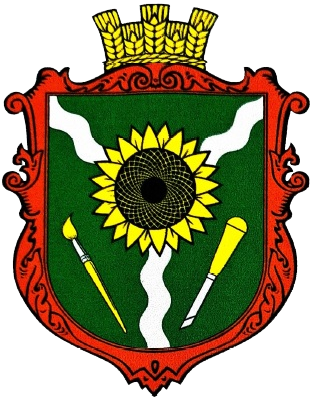
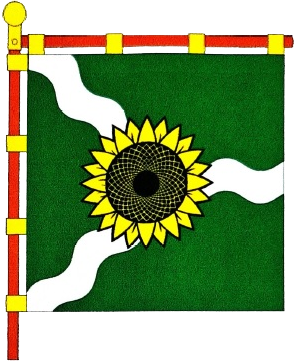
- Flag Coat of arms

- Location in Ternopil Oblast
- Coordinates: 48°38′19″N 26°05′05″E
- Country: Ukraine
- Oblast: Ternopil Oblast
- Raion: Chortkiv Raion
- Hromada: Ivane-Puste Hromada
- Postal code: 48746

Pylypche (Ukrainian: Пилипче) is a village in Ivane-Puste rural hromada, Chortkiv Raion, Ternopil Oblast, Ukraine.

== History ==
The first written mention is from 1415.

== Religion ==
- Church of the Dormition (1907, brick, UGCC)

== People ==
- Jacques Hnizdovsky (1915–1985), Ukrainian-American painter, printmaker, graphic designer, illustrator and sculptor

== Sources ==
- (in Ukrainian) В. Процюк, В. Уніят, Пилипче // Ternopil Encyclopedic Dictionary: in 4 v. / editorial board: H. Yavorskyi and other, Ternopil: "Zbruch", 2008, V. 3: П—Я, 708 s. — ISBN 978-966-528-279-2.
