= Jean Fernand =

French painter and sculptor

- Born: 19 November 1948 (age 77); Orly, France
- Known for: Painting, drawing, sculpture, printmaking
- Movement: Impressionism; Modernism

Jean Fernand (born 19 November 1948) is a French impressionist painter, lithographer, sculptor and illustrator.

== History ==
Jean Fernand was born in 1948 in Orly, 30 kilometres (19 mi) south of Paris. His parents, who were Parisians, managed an industrial laundry. When he left the primary school, Jean Fernand passed his launderer certificate; he was therefore destined to take up the family business. His grandfather was a painter who also lacquered Napoleon's tomb, so Fernand was already very interested in painting and drawing since childhood.

At the age of 16, he began to paint. He received painting classes from several artists such as André Bergeron and Gozlan. From the age of 25, he gradually devoted himself to painting, gradually forming his style. In 1970, he opened an art studio in Orly.

His first exhibition took place in 1970 in the Salon des Indépendants in Paris. In the early 70s, he showcased his works several times at the influential art gallery Galerie Ror Volmar. His works have also been exhibited in galleries in Switzerland, Japan, Sweden, Norway, Germany, Belgium, Japan and the United States. During the seventies, he illustrated also some stories by Edgar Allan Poe for the publishing house Cercle Européen du Livre. He became friends with the painter Francis Goubault, originally from Choisy-le-Roi. Together, they created different frescoes.

He won several art prizes, including the first prize at Lézignan-Corbières in 2003.
