= Galerie Ror Volmar =

Galerie Ror Volmar or Ror Volmar Gallery was an influential art gallery located at 58 Rue de Bourgogne in the 7th arrondissement of Paris. The gallery specialized in contemporary figurative painters. In 1970, Art International reported that the gallery had been "holding an exhibition of paintings unusual both in content and treatment." Ukrainian painter Liuboslav Hutsaliuk held his first exhibition at the gallery in 1956. Tamara de Lempicka showcased at the gallery from 30 May to 17 June, 1961. Durnad Rosé showcased at the gallery from 10 to 23 November, 1967. In 1977, the gallery honored Marcel Anselme. In the early 70s, the French impressionist painter Jean Fernand showcased some works at the gallery.
