= Lys Mykyta (book) =

1890 children's book by Ivan Franko

Lys Mykyta (Ukrainian: Лис Микита, Mykyta the Fox) is an 1890 children's book by Ivan Franko, written as a verse novella based upon a popular European plot.

== Creation and publication ==
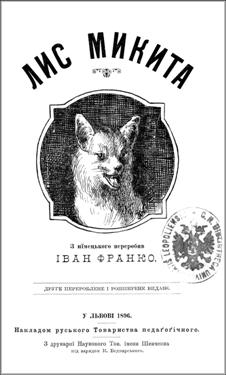
1896 edition of the book illustrated by Teofil Kopystynskyi

Franko wrote the tale for his children Andriy, Taras, Petro and Anna. Franko adopted a traditional European plot about the fox, adorning it with Boyko features, including elements of the local dialect, and thus creating an original work of literature. The story was first published in the children's magazine Dzvinok ("Bell") in 1890, and one year later saw the light as a separate book. The original story consisted of 9 parts ("songs"), but three more were added in the new version published in 1896. The story's fifth edition, the last during Franko's lifetime, was published in Kyiv in 1914 is a censored form.

== Plot ==
Mykyta, the main personage of the tale, as a cunning, inventive and vile fox, who acts for his own benefit, tricking other animals living in the forest, including the Lion - king of the animals. Many characters of the tale were based on the author's personal acquaintances, and its plot ridicules human weaknesses and other negative features with the use of irony.

== Illustrations ==
The first four editions of the tale were illustrated by Teofil Kopystynskyi. Later several prominent artists including Edward Kozak, Olena Kulchytska and Sofia Karaffa-Korbut created their own illustration for the book.

== Influence and legacy ==
With Franko being recognized as a classic of Ukrainian literature, many generations of Ukrainians grew up with his tale. A satirical magazine named after the work was founded by Edward Kozak in the United States. In 2025 a comic book based on Franko's tale was published in Ukraine, and a travelling exhibition dedicated to the 135th anniversary of the publication was organized by the Franko House in Lviv.

A Ukrainian animated series based upon the tale was created in 2005-2007.
