= Edward Kozak =

Ukrainian cartoonist (1902–1992)

- Едвард Теодорович Козак
- Born: 21 January 1902; Hirne, Austria-Hungary (now Ukraine)
- Died: 22 September 1992 (aged 90); Warren, Michigan, U.S.
- Other names: EKO, E. K., Ek, Koko, Zyz, Kosyi, Pik, Avenir Liushnia, Hryts Zozulia, Maik Chichka, Mamai
- Education: Oleksa Novakivskyi Art School
- Occupations: Сartoonist, humor writer, publisher, designer

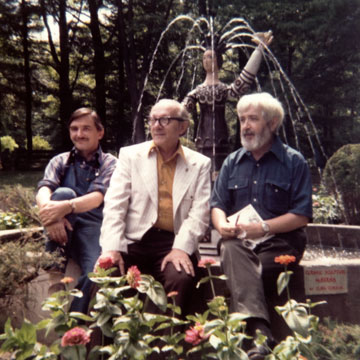
Liuboslav Hutsaliuk, Edward Kozak and Jacques Hnizdovsky in the 1960s.

Edward Kozak (Ukrainian: Едвард Теодорович Козак; 21 January 1902 – 22 September 1992) was a Ukrainian cartoonist, humor writer, publisher, designer. Brother of Alfred, father of George and Jerome Kozak's.

== Biography ==
Born on 21 January 1902 in Hirne, now Stryi Raion, Lviv Oblast, Ukraine.

He graduated from the art schools of Vienna and Lublin, and in 1930 from the Oleksa Novakivskyi Art School. During World War I, he fought in the Ukrainian Galician Army. In 1922, in Lviv, he was a defendant in the trial of the Ukrainian Military Organization. During 1923–1924, he served in the Polish Land Forces.

Later, he worked in Lviv, where he illustrated and edited the magazines "Zyz" in 1923–1933, and "Komar" in 1933–1939; also, in 1933–1939, he illustrated for the Ivan Tyktor Publishing Concern. Later, he worked in Kraków, where from 1940 to 1944 he illustrated the magazines "Yuni Druzi" and "Doroha"; from 1940 to 1941 he was a cartoonist for the German Occupation "Krakauer Zeitung" magazine. In the 1940s, in the latter city, he headed the Ukrainian art circle "Zarevo". In 1933, he illustrated the book "Lys Mykyta" by Ivan Franko.

In 1944, he moved to Germany. In 1947–1948, he headed the Union of Ukrainian Fine Artists in the resettlement camps. In 1950, he emigrated to the U.S.

For many years, he was a member of various creative unions, including the Association of Independent Ukrainian Artists from 1932 to 1939, the Union of Ukrainian Fine Artists from 1941 to 1944, and the Ukrainian Union of Fine Artists in 1945.

Died on 22 September 1992 in Warren, Michigan, U.S.

== Creativity ==
He created in the fields of monumental church art and feature film. The author of poems on humorous themes, feuilletons, and two volumes of short stories "Hryts Zozulya" (1973) and "Na khlopskyi rozum Hrytsia Zozuli" (1982). From 1946 to 1991, he edited, published, and illustrated the satirical and humorous magazine "Lys Mykyta" in Munich, New York, and Detroit.

In 1951–1957, he illustrated children's fairy tales on American television and was also a television film artist for the Jam Handy Film Studio in Detroit.

In 1929–1930, he also painted churches in the Lviv Oblast. In the 1950s, he created Ukrainian design, posters, and wrappers in the United States, and in 1942–1944 he collaborated with the "Veselyi Lviv" Small Forms Theater. Author of the decorations for the main hall of the Ukrainian resort Soyuzivka.

He is the author of about 1000 paintings, several thousand caricatures, and illustrations on Ukrainian topics. In the 1930s, he participated in exhibitions, and in 1990, a personal exhibition was held in Lviv.

Among the main works:

- graphics: the cycle "Za motyvamy striletskykh pisen" (1930s); series of color postcards: on the theme of Ukrainian folk songs (Munich, 1949), "Selo" (Munich, 1956), to the 50th anniversary of the Ukrainian Sich Riflemen (New York, 1965); "Lys Mykyta" (1960s), "Volodymyr Velykyi", "Vesillia", "Ukrainskyi yarmarok", "Pokutskyi yarmarok", "Stara korchma", "Selo", "Hutsulska nich", "Trembity klychut", "Lisovyi chort", "Molfar", "Hutsuliia", "Divchyna z ptakhoiu", "Mamai", "Yidut do mista", "Duma pro kozaka Holotu", "Chornyi kozak" (all 1960s-90s);
- painting: "Motyv Kosmacha" (1935), "Znesinska tserkva u Lvovi", "Syn Yurii" (both 1942).

== Awards ==
In the 1950s, he won three first prizes in the All-American competition for a series of color television paintings.

== Bibliography ==
- L. Voloshyn (2024). "Козак Едвард". Мистецька школа Олекси Новаківського 1923-1935. Життя у перспективі часу (in Ukrainian). Lviv–Drohobych: Kolo. p. 248—250, 372—373. ISBN 978-617-642-676-9.
