= Hermakivka =

Rural locality in Ternopil Oblast, Ukraine

Hermakivka Гермаківка
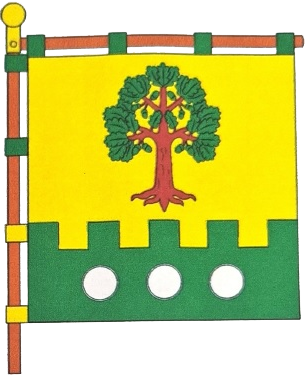
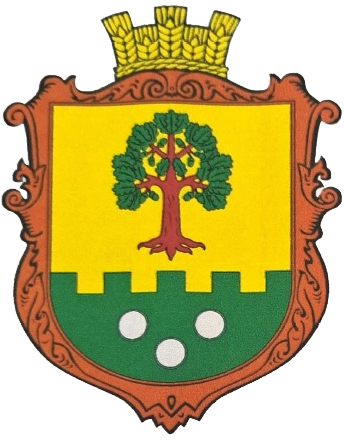
- Flag Coat of arms

- Location in Ternopil Oblast
- Coordinates: 48°41′34″N 26°10′46″E
- Country: Ukraine
- Oblast: Ternopil Oblast
- Raion: Chortkiv Raion
- Hromada: Ivane-Puste rural hromada
- Time zone: UTC+2 (EET)
  - Summer (DST): UTC+3 (EEST)
- Postal code: 48742

Hermakivka (Ukrainian: Гермаківка) is a village in Ivane-Puste rural hromada, Chortkiv Raion, Ternopil Oblast, Ukraine.

== History ==
The first written mention dates from 1641.

After the liquidation of the Borshchiv Raion on 19 July 2020, the village became part of the Chortkiv Raion.

== Religion ==
- two churches of the Assumption (1815, OCU; 1905, rebuilt from a Roman Catholic church in 2009; UGCC).

== Sources ==
- (in Ukrainian) Боєчко В., Мельничук Б., Уніят, В., Гермаківка // Ternopil Encyclopedic Dictionary: in 4 v. / editorial board: H. Yavorskyi and other, Ternopil: "Zbruch", 2004, V. 1: А—Й, S. 305. — ISBN 966-528-197-6.
- "Germakówka". Geographical Dictionary of the Kingdom of Poland (in Polish). 2. Warszawa: Kasa im. Józefa Mianowskiego. 1881. p. 537-538.
