= Mykyta the Fox =

Ukrainian animated series

- Лис Микита
- Created by: Volodymyr Kmetyk, Pavlo Movchan
- Directed by: Volodymyr Kmetyk
- Country of origin: Ukraine
- Original language: Ukrainian
- No. of seasons: 1
- No. of episodes: 26

Production
- Running time: 15 min

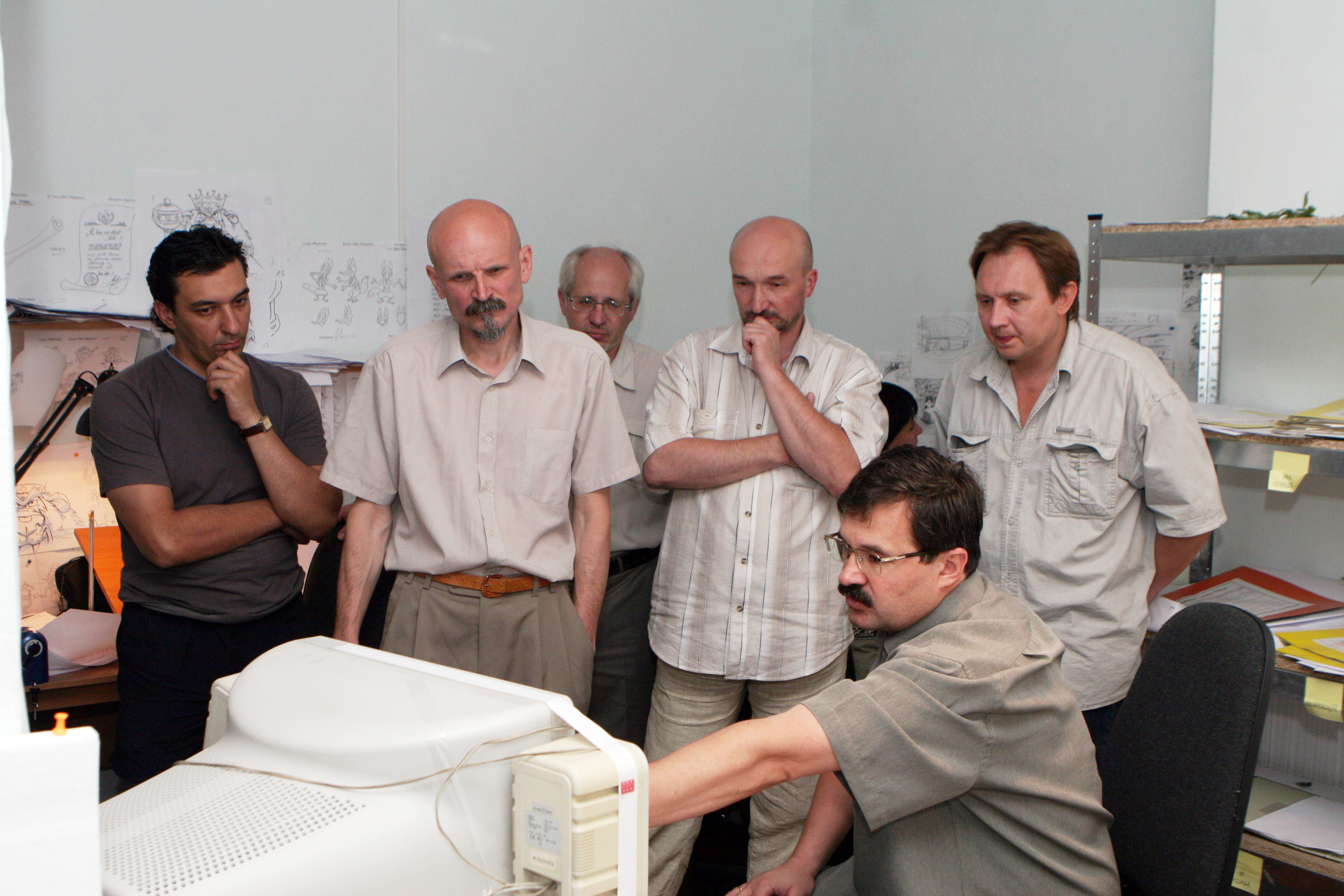
Creators of Lys Mykyta at work in 2006

Mykyta the Fox (Ukrainian: «Лис Микита», romanized: Lys Mykyta) is the first Ukrainian animated series made in the country since it declared independence from the USSR. The series is based on Ivan Franko's satirical fairy tale poem Lys Mykyta.

== History of creation ==
The series was created on the order of the all-Ukrainian Prosvita society. It is based on the eponymous satirical fairy tale in verse by Ivan Franko (an adaptation of the popular European tale of Reynard). The series had a budget of ₴10 million (according to alternative data, ₴6 million). A theatrical pre-release was held at Kinopalats in Kyiv on 15 June 2007. The series premiered on TV in 2009 on Pershyi Natsionalnyi, having already been released on DVD in 2008. The cartoon was also broadcast in other countries, including Latvia, Hungary, Poland and Turkey.

== Plot ==
The series tells the story of a witty and cunning fox Mykyta, his adventures and relationships with his other animals.

=== Characters ===
- Mykyta the Fox
- Burmylo the Bear
- Hektor the Puppy
- The Vixen
- The Lion
- Murlyka the Cat
- Nesyty the Wolf
- Bazyliy the Goat
- The Hare
- The Rooster
- The Sheep
- Fruzia the Monkey

== Episodes ==
The series consists of 26 episodes of 15 minutes each:

- Episode 1 “Nesyty the Wolf”
- Episode 2 “Hektor the Puppy”
- Episode 3 “Rooster”
- Episode 4 “Bear”
- Episode 5 “Deck”
- Episode 6 “Cat Purr”
- Episode 7 “Spizharnya” (“Pantry”)
- Episode 8 “Tribunal”
- Episode 9 “The Verdict”
- Episode 10 “Chicken Coop”
- Episode 11 “Burmilov”
- Episode 12 “Irony of Fate”
- Episode 13 “Wolf Trouble”
- Episode 14 “Sheep Patriot”
- Episode 15 “The Tailor”
- Episode 16 “Hare”
- Episode 17 “Letter to the Tsar”
- Episode 18 “Basilius the Goat”
- Episode 19 “Nag”
- Episode 20 “Voice from the Sky”
- Episode 21 “Sexton”
- Episode 22 “Fruzia the Monkey”
- Episode 23 “Fishing”
- Episode 24 “The Well”
- Episode 25 “Duel”
- Episode 26 “His Majesty’s Chancellor”

== Interesting facts ==
- When the animals begin to get angry at the king of animals, Leo, the song of the group “GreenJolly” "Together we are rich" is played - the anthem of the Orange Revolution.
- Burmylo the Bear and Mykyta the Fox go to steal honey in the village, the song “We are carried by the ocean, in it we can do everything...” by the group “Okean Elzy” is heard.
- The animated series was planned for 260 minutes, but was produced in 405 minutes.
- The series soundtrack includes songs by GreenJolly, Okean Elzy, Braty Hadyukiny, and ABBA.
- The cartoon uses national and satirical features of clothing. For example, Mykyta the Fox, the Sun in the Hutsul keptare or the Moon in the nightcap.
- The score was composed with the participation of Myroslav Skoryk.
- 450,000 drawings were used to create this animated series.
- 70 animators were involved in the creation of the series.

== See also ==
- Ukrainian animation
