= Roma Pryma-Bohachevsky =

Roma Pryma-Bohachevsky (Ukrainian: Рома Прийма-Богачевська, translit. Roma Pryima-Bohachevs'ka) (1927 – May 23, 2004) was a dancer and choreographer, who instructed thousands of students in the art of ballet and Ukrainian dance.

== Education ==
Roma Pryma was born into a musical family in Przemyśl, a city in present-day Poland, but spent her formative years in Lviv, a city in present-day western Ukraine. At the age of 5, her mother, Ivanna Pryma, sensing her daughter's talent for movement, enrolled her in eurhythmics classes, as well as in the study of modern dance, under M. Bronevska, a disciple of Mary Wigman. Between the years 1939–44, Roma began performing at the Lviv Opera and Ballet Theater, and after a year and a half, she moved up from serving in the corps de ballet, to small solo roles of a character nature. Leaving her homeland after World War II, Roma and her mother resettled in Austria in 1944, where after 3 years she graduated with honors from the Academy of Music and Dramatic Arts in Vienna and later became a soloist in the ballet group of the National Theater in Innsbruck.

At this point, Roma turned away from pursuing a career dedicated to classical ballet and followed her roots in alternative expression. After a meeting with Harald Kreutzberg at his villa in the Alps, she began to focus on creating expressionistic choreographies.

== Career ==
Ms. Bohachevsky's stage appearances included solo performances and concert tours of Europe, North America and Central America. Eventually, she turned to teaching and choreography, influenced by the methods of Agrippina Vaganova and Martha Graham, with whom she studied.

Among Mrs. Bohachevsky's many choreographic creations are "Peer Gynt," "Kvit Paporoti" (Blossoming Fern), and "Cinderella," which have been danced over the years by hundreds of her students. At each summer camp, Mrs. Bohachevsky brought to life a Fairy Tale, weaving traditional and classical themes with imaginative staging, choreography, and costumes. The summer camps continue as of June, July, and August 2014 under her namesake at Soyuzivka Ukrainian Heritage Center in the Shawangunk Mountains of Kerhonkson, New York.

More impressive choreographies are the ones she created specifically for the Syzokryli Ukrainian Dance Ensemble, composed of her most talented students. Each choreography brings out the beauty of the Ukrainian theme developed in the dance, interwoven with elements of ballet, modern and stylized folk dance. Among her creations are "Battle for Freedom," a dramatic ballet commemorating the tragedy of Chernobyl, and "Icona," a historical recreation celebrating the millennium of Christianity in Ukraine. Shortly, after her death, a concert performed in Lincoln Center showcased much of the work she had taught her students.

== Bibliography ==
- Pasternakova, Maria (1964). Ukrainian Woman in Choreography, Ukrainian Women's Association of Canada & Natalia Kobrynska Foundation.
