= Mlynky Cave =

Gypsum cave system in Zalissia, Ukraine

Mlynky
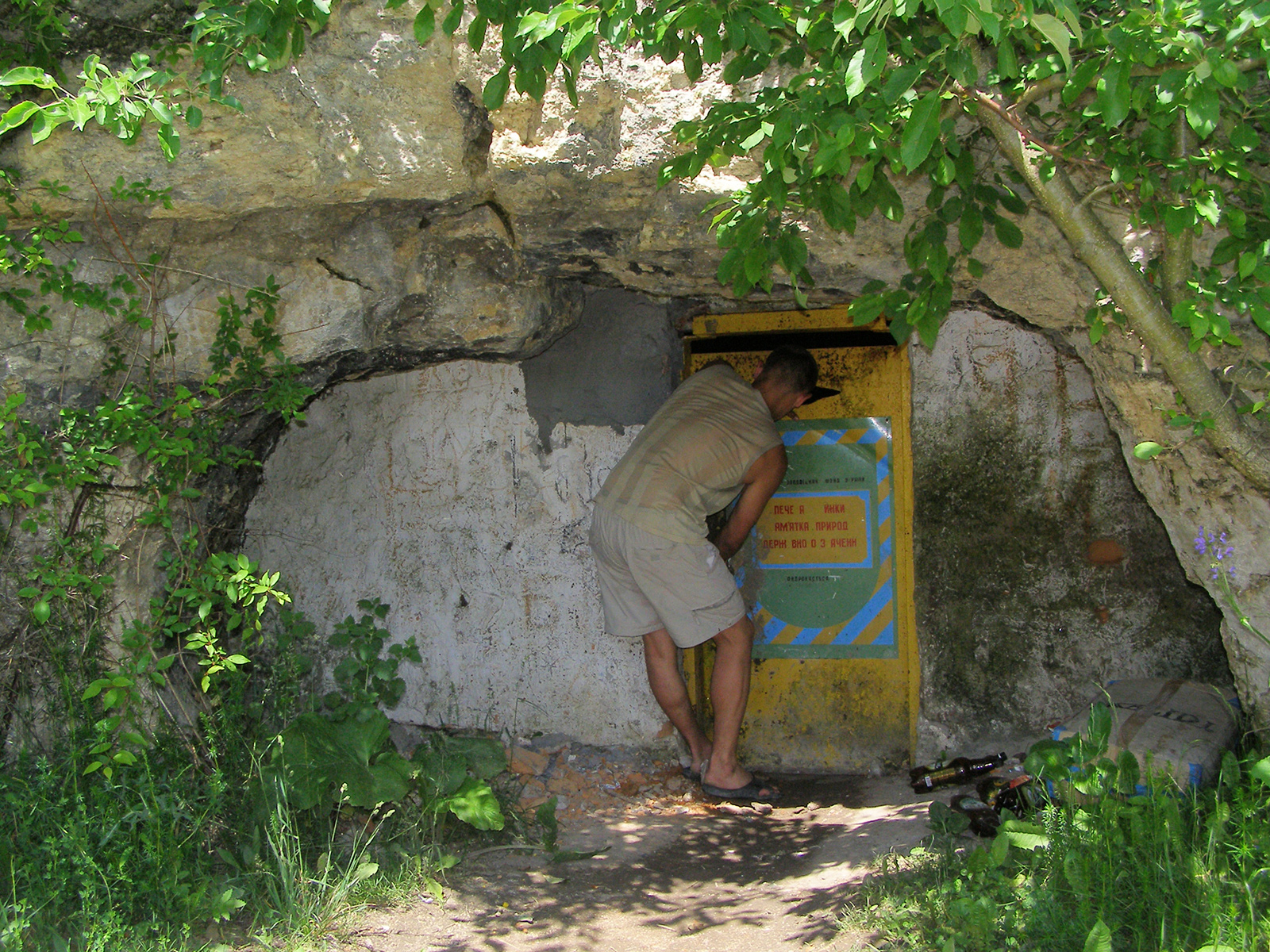
- Interactive map of Mlynky
- Location: Zalissia, Zavodske settlement hromada, Chortkiv Raion, Ternopil Oblast, Ukraine
- Coordinates: 48°57′20″N 25°52′32″E
- Length: 50 km (31 mi)
- Discovery: 1960
- Geology: gypsum

Млинки (Ukrainian: Млинки) is a gypsum cave located in the Ukrainian village of Zalissia, Zavodske settlement hromada, Chortkiv Raion, Ternopil Oblast.

== History ==
On 25 June 1960, the Chortkiv Raion newspaper Nove Zhyttia published an article by Mykhailo Bil, a teacher at the Uhryn school, entitled "Mlynetska Cave".

The area is 0.5 hectares. Since 1971, it has been under protection, in particular, a natural labyrinth of karst origin with a total length of more than 50 km of passages.

Before the opening of the passages, foxes lived in the cave.

In 1960–1967, Mlynky were explored by members of the Ternopil section of speleology. Nowadays, the cave is studied by the Chortkiv club of speleologists "Krystal".

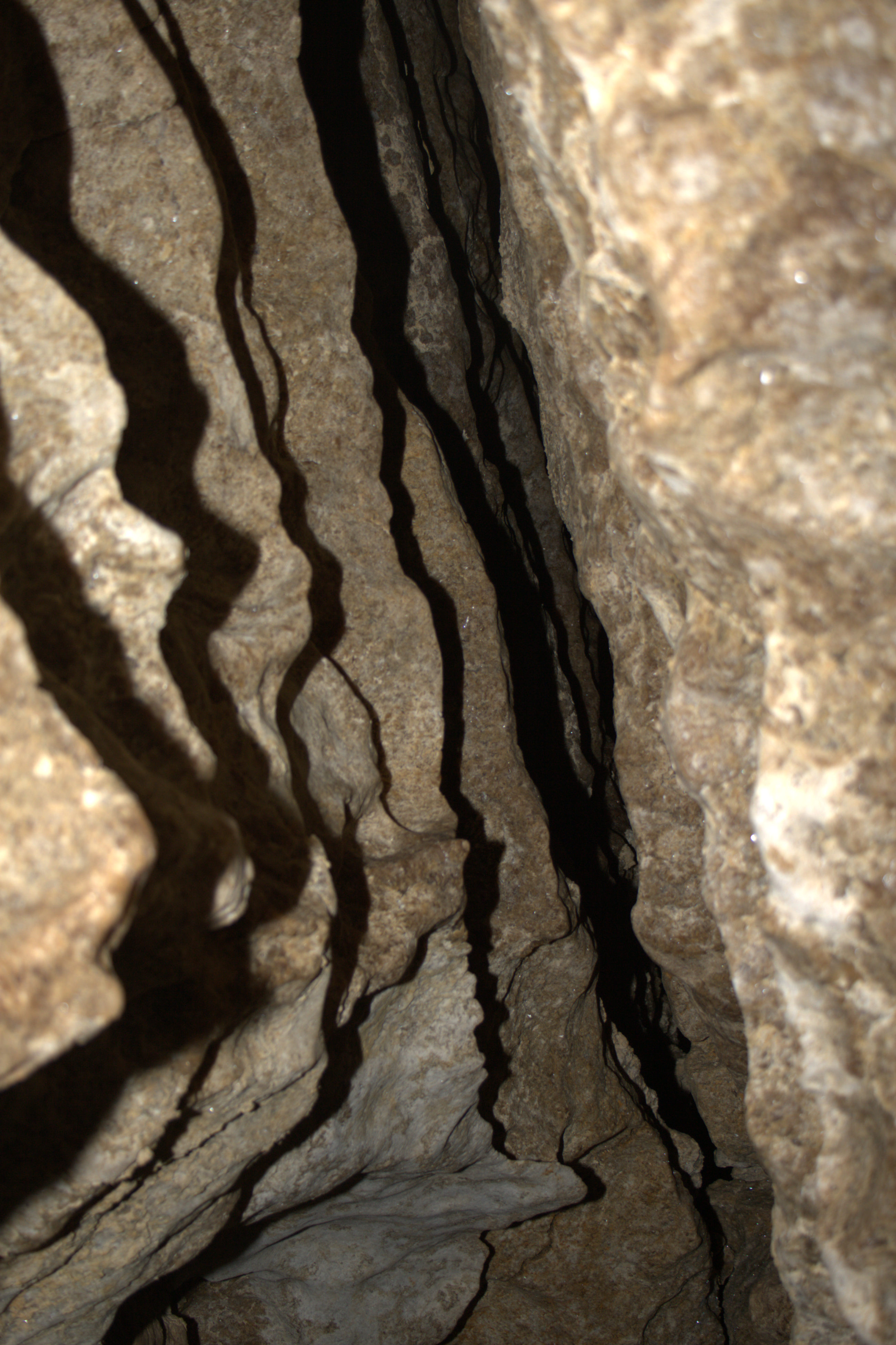

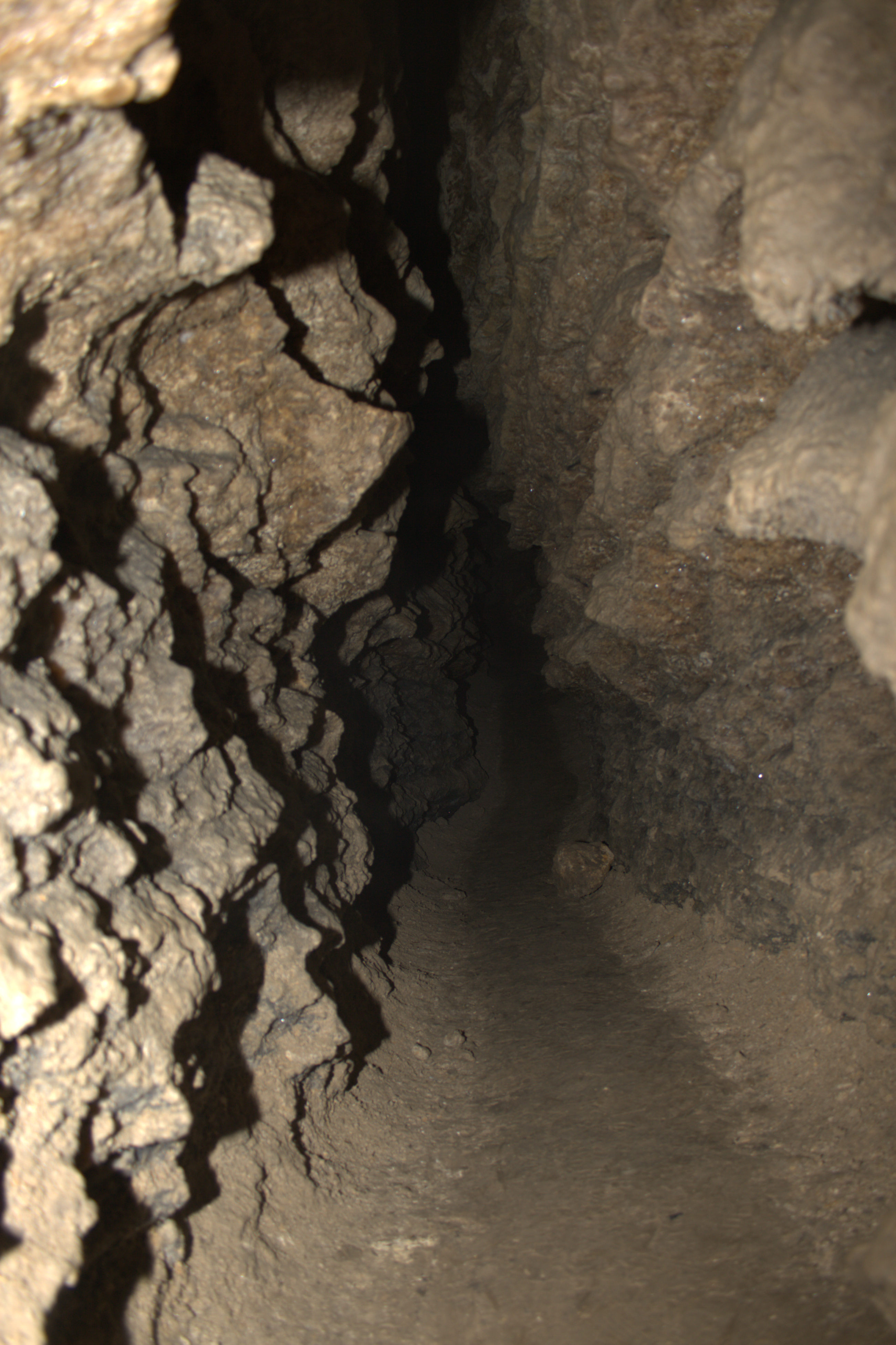

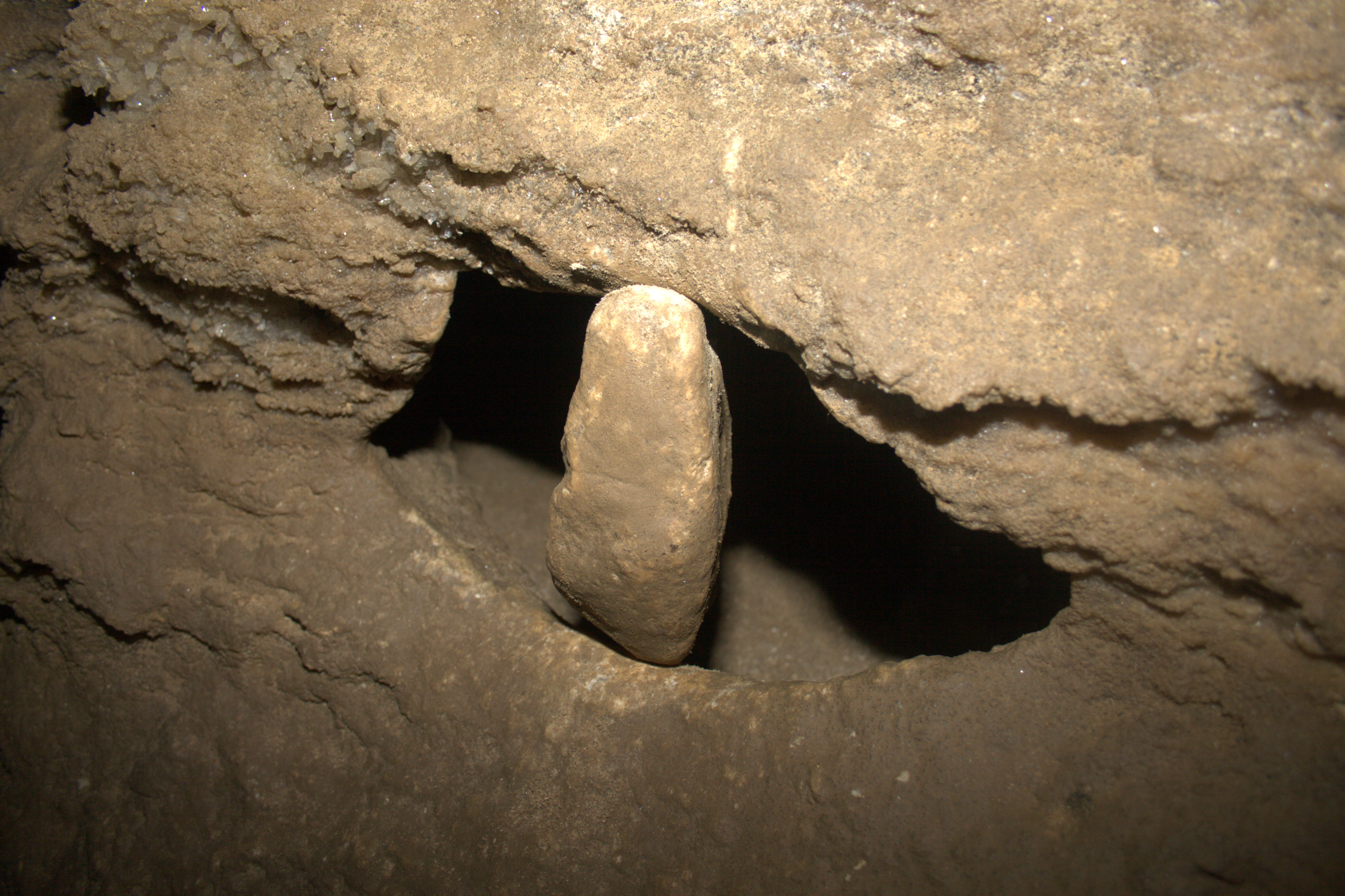

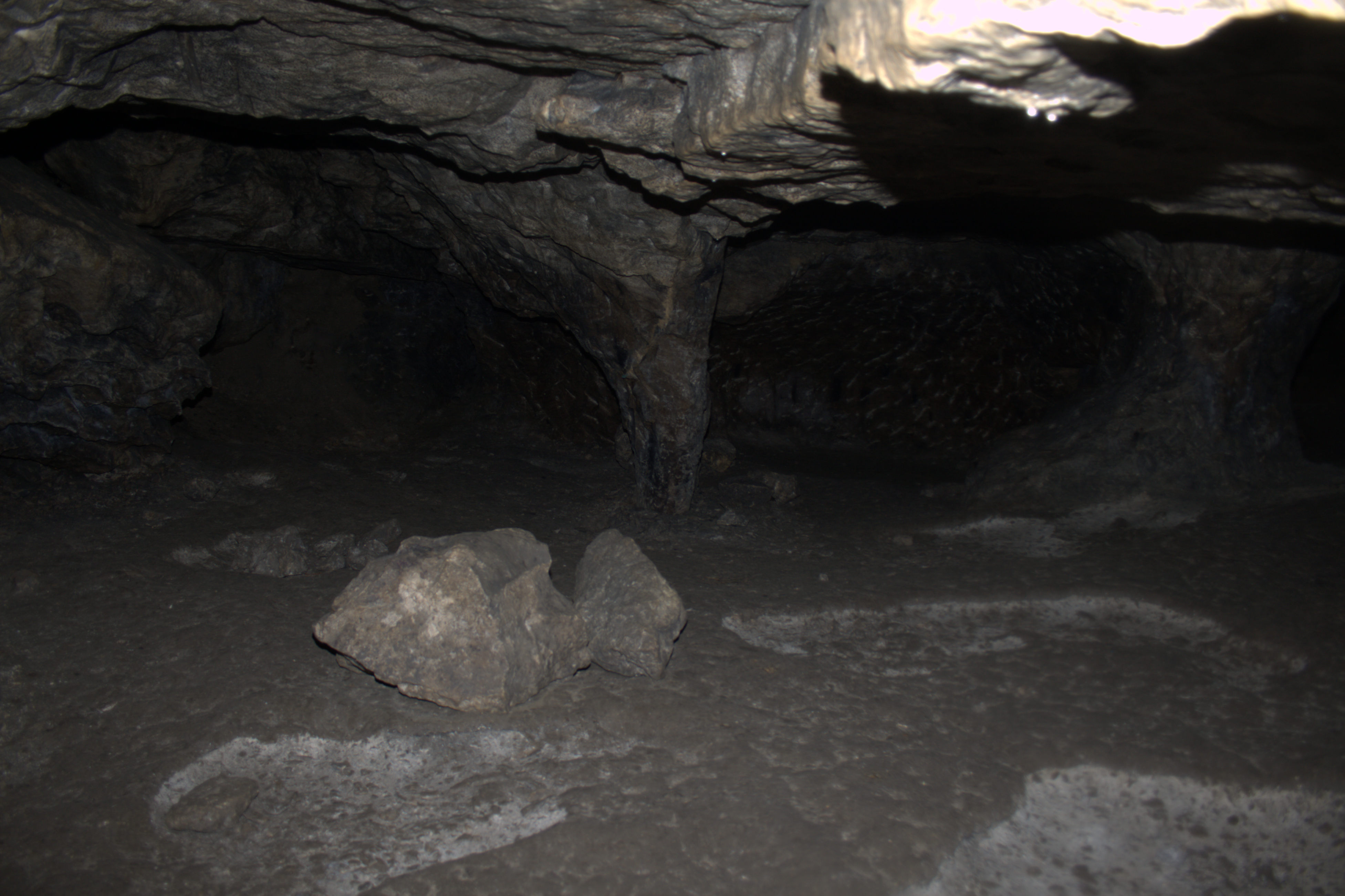

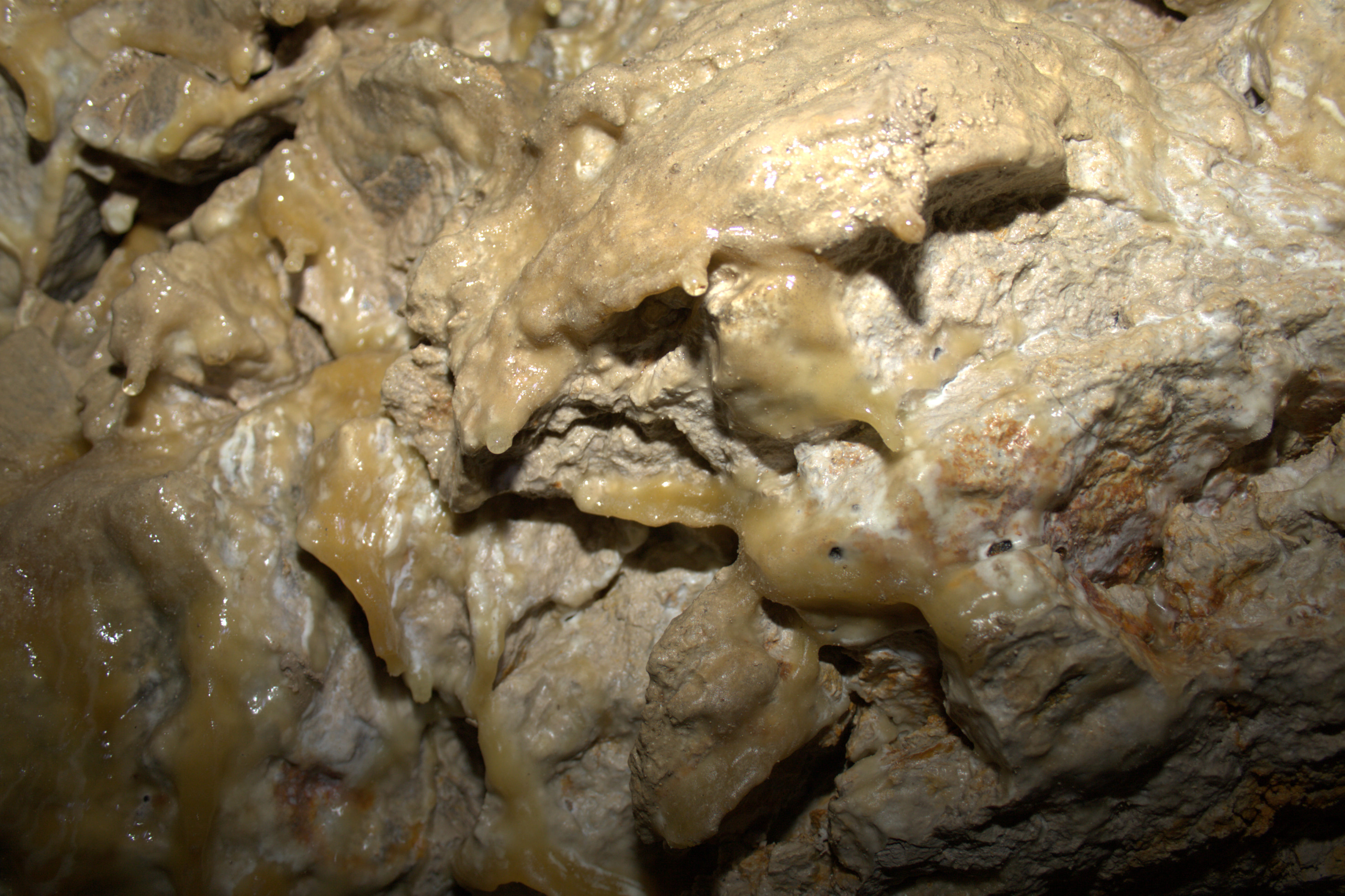
