= Lys Mykyta (magazine) =

Lys Mykyta (Ukrainian: Лис Микита) was a Ukrainian-language satirical and humorous magazine. The magazine took its name from Ivan Franko's story about a wily fox. Edward Kozak published it between 1947 and 1990, and featured cartoons and caricatures. The poet Bohdan Nyzankiwsky was a regular contributor under his pen name Babay. Lys Mykyta was originally published in Munich where Kozak taught. Still, when he emigrated to the United States with Liuboslav Hutsaliuk (another regular contributor and friend of Kozak), it moved location.
