= Zalissia, Lviv Oblast =

Rural locality in Lviv Oblast, Ukraine

Zalissia Залісся
- Location in Lviv Oblast
- Coordinates: 49°47′28″N 24°49′27″E
- Country: Ukraine
- Oblast: Lviv Oblast
- Raion: Zolochiv Raion
- Hromada: Zolochiv urban hromada
- Time zone: UTC+2 (EET)
  - Summer (DST): UTC+3 (EEST)
- Postal code: 80750

Zalissia (Ukrainian: Залісся) is a village in the Zolochiv urban hromada of the Zolochiv Raion of Lviv Oblast in Ukraine.

== History ==
On 19 July 2020, as a result of the administrative-territorial reform and liquidation of the Zolochiv Raion, the village became part of the Zolochiv Raion.

== Religion ==
- Saint Paraskeva church (1804, brick)

== Sources ==
- "Zalesie". Geographical Dictionary of the Kingdom of Poland (in Polish). 14. Warszawa: Kasa im. Józefa Mianowskiego. 1895. p. 340.
