= Zalissia, Ivane-Puste rural hromada, Chortkiv Raion, Ternopil Oblast =

Rural locality in Ternopil Oblast, Ukraine

Zalissia Залісся
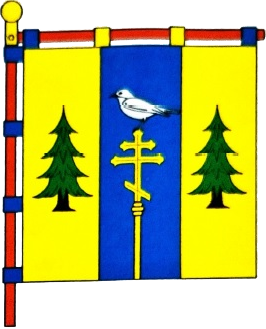
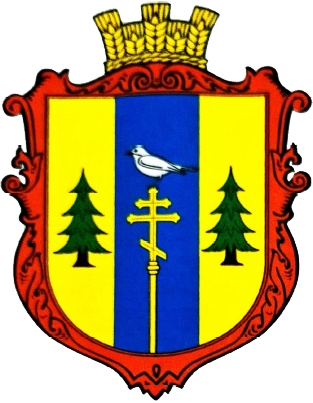
- Flag Coat of arms

- Location in Ternopil Oblast
- Coordinates: 48°39′59″N 26°14′8″E
- Country: Ukraine
- Oblast: Ternopil Oblast
- Raion: Chortkiv Raion
- Hromada: Ivane-Puste rural hromada
- Time zone: UTC+2 (EET)
  - Summer (DST): UTC+3 (EEST)
- Postal code: 48745

Zalissia (Ukrainian: Залісся) is a village in Ivane-Puste rural hromada, Chortkiv Raion, Ternopil Oblast, Ukraine.

== History ==
Known from the 15th century.

After the liquidation of the Borshchiv Raion on 19 July 2020, the village became part of the Chortkiv Raion.

== Religion ==
- Church of the Transfiguration (1835, brick),
- Roman Catholic church.

== Sources ==
- (in Ukrainian) Уніят, В., Залісся // Ternopil Encyclopedic Dictionary: in 4 v. / editorial board: H. Yavorskyi and other, Ternopil: "Zbruch", 2004, V. 1: А—Й, S. 606—607. — ISBN 966-528-197-6.
- "Zalesie 1.) wś, pow. borszczowski". Geographical Dictionary of the Kingdom of Poland (in Polish). 14. Warszawa: Kasa im. Józefa Mianowskiego. 1895. p. 340.
