= Ivane-Puste rural hromada =

Hromada in Ternopil Oblast, Ukraine

Ivane-Puste rural hromada Іване-Пустенська сільська громада
- hromada
- Location within Ternopil Oblast Location within Ukraine
- Coordinates: 48°38′41″N 26°11′14″E
- Country: Ukraine
- Oblast: Ternopil Oblast
- Raion: Chortkiv Raion
- Administrative center: Ivane-Puste

Government
  - Hromada head: Mariia Skaliak

Area
  - Total: 80.7 km^{2} (31.2 sq mi)

Population (2022)
  - Total: 4,754
- Villages: 4
- Website: ivanepustenska-gromada.gov.ua

Ivane-Puste rural territorial hromada (Ukrainian: Іване-Пустенська територіальна громада, romanized: Ivane-Pustenska silska terytorialna hromada) is a hromada in Ukraine, in Chortkiv Raion of Ternopil Oblast. The administrative center is the village of Ivane-Puste. Its population is 4,754 (2022 estimate)

== Settlements ==
The hromada consists of 4 villages:

- Ivane-Puste
- Hermakivka
- Zalissia
- Pylypche
