= Zalissia, Zavodske settlement hromada, Chortkiv Raion, Ternopil Oblast =

Zalissia Залісся
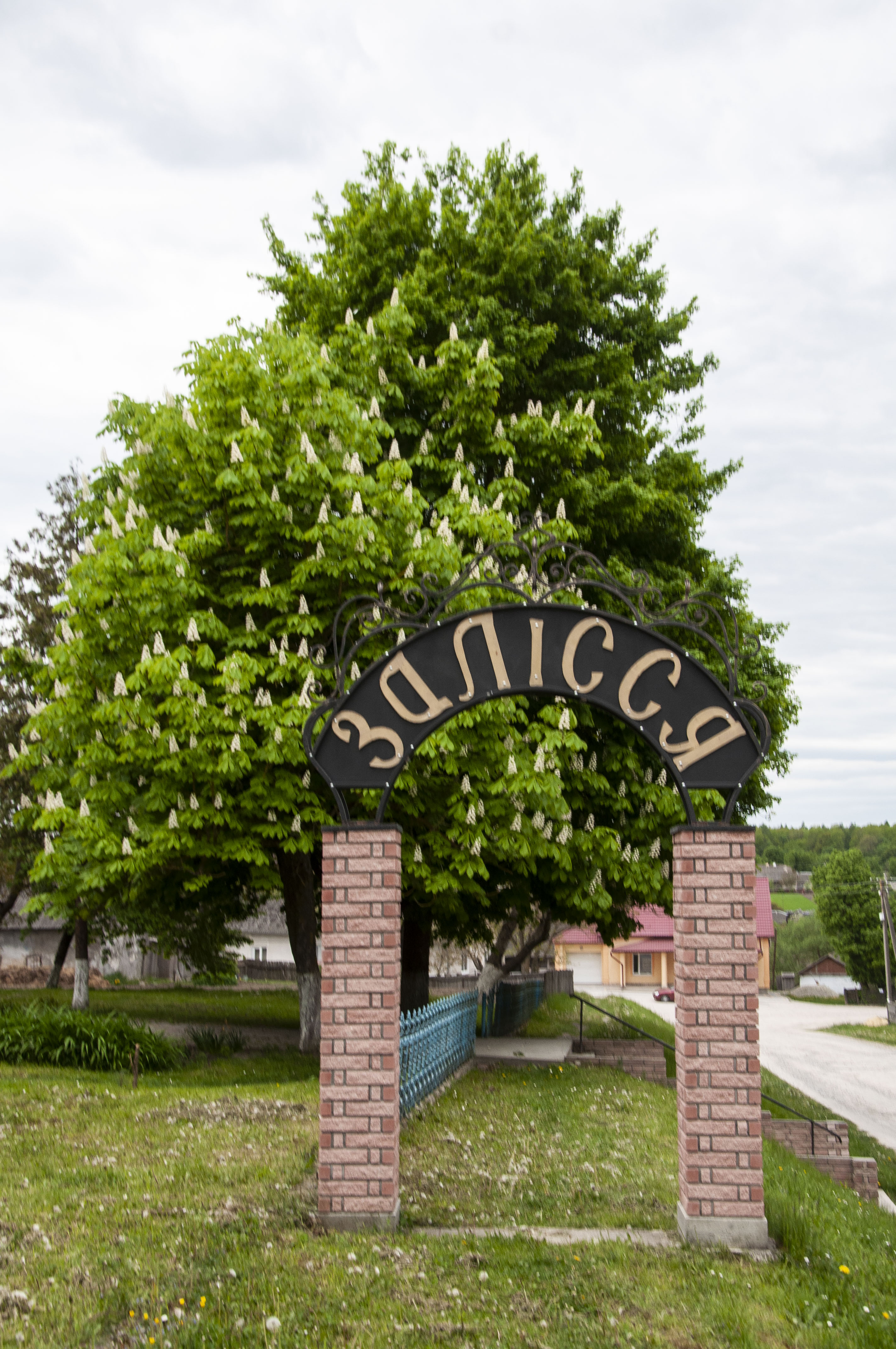
- A sign at the entrance to the village

- Flag Coat of arms

- Location in Ternopil Oblast
- Coordinates: 48°56′38″N 25°53′30″E
- Country: Ukraine
- Oblast: Ternopil Oblast
- Raion: Chortkiv Raion
- Hromada: Zavodske Hromada

Population (2021)
  - Total: 860
- Time zone: UTC+2 (EET)
  - Summer (DST): UTC+3 (EEST)
- Postal code: 48561

Zalissia (Ukrainian: Залісся, Polish: Zalesie) is a village in Ukraine, Ternopil Oblast, Chortkiv Raion, Zavodske settlement hromada.

== Geography ==
There is a cave Mlynky in the village.

== History ==
The first written mention is from 1561.

Since 27 November 2020, Zalissia has belonged to the Zavodske settlement hromada.

== Religion ==
- Saint Michael church (OCU, built in 1895)
- Saint Michael church (UGCC, 1998)
- Church of the Assumption of the Blessed Virgin (1801)
