= Zalissia, Zolochiv Raion, Lviv Oblast =

Rural locality in Lviv Oblast, Ukraine

Zalissia
- Village
- Location within Lviv Oblast Location within Ukraine
- Coordinates: 49.9881°N 25.2208°E
- Country: Ukraine
- Oblast: Lviv
- Raion: Zolochiv
- Area: 0.683 km^{2} (0.264 sq mi)
- Population: 90
  - Density: 131/km^{2} (340/sq mi)

Zalissia (Ukrainian: Залісся) is a village (selo) in Zolochiv Raion, Lviv Oblast, in western Ukraine. It belongs to Pidkamin settlement hromada, one of the hromadas of Ukraine.

From 1918 to 1939 the village belonged to Tarnopol Voivodeship in Poland.

Until 18 July 2020, Zalissia belonged to Brody Raion. The raion was abolished in July 2020 as part of the administrative reform of Ukraine, which reduced the number of raions of Lviv Oblast to seven. The area of Brody Raion was merged into Zolochiv Raion.
