= Jacques Hnizdovsky =

Ukrainian-American painter

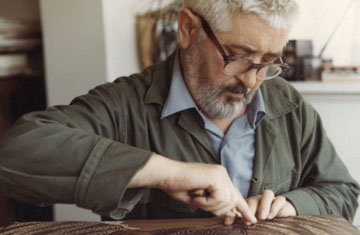
- Jacques Hnizdovsky carving the woodblock "Two Rams" in his studio in New York, 1969
- Born: Yakiv Yakovych Hnizdovsky; January 27, 1915; Pylypche, Austria-Hungary (now Ukraine)
- Died: November 8, 1985 (aged 70); New York City, New York, United States
- Education: Academy of Fine Arts, Warsaw; Academy of Fine Arts, Zagreb
- Known for: painting, printmaking, watercolor, ceramics, graphic design, bookplate design, book illustration, book cover design, lettering design
- Notable work: www.hnizdovsky.com www.jacqueshnizdovsky.com
- Movement: stylized realism

Jacques Hnizdovsky (1915 – 1985, born Yakiv Yakovych Hnizdovsky) (Note: Ukrainian: Яків Якович Гніздовський, romanized: Yakiv Yakovych Hnizdovskyi; Polish: Jakub Gniazdowski; Croatian: Jakiv Hnizdovskij) was a Ukrainian-born American painter, printmaker, graphic designer, illustrator and sculptor.

== Biography ==
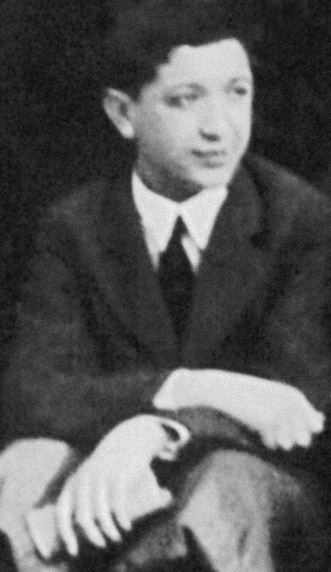
Young Hnizdovsky in the 1930s

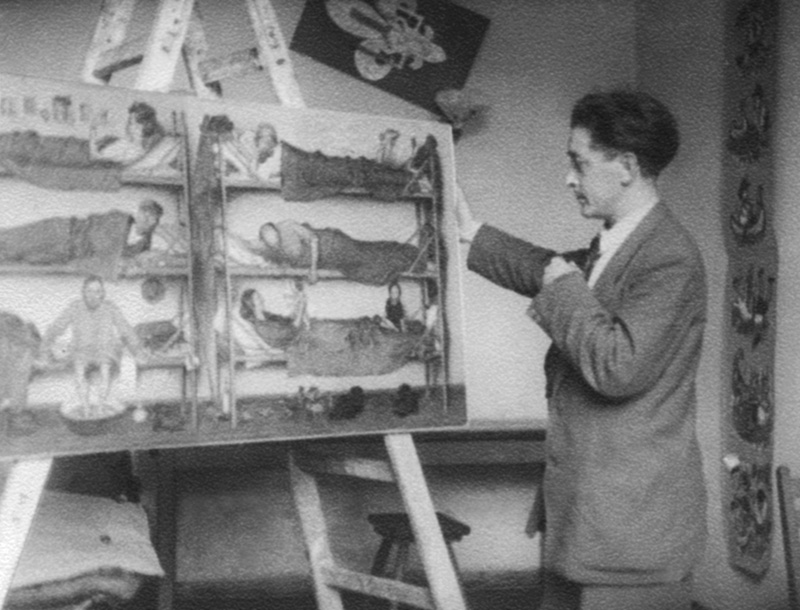
Hnizdovsky with his painting "Displaced Persons", 1948, now in the Ukrainian Museum, New York

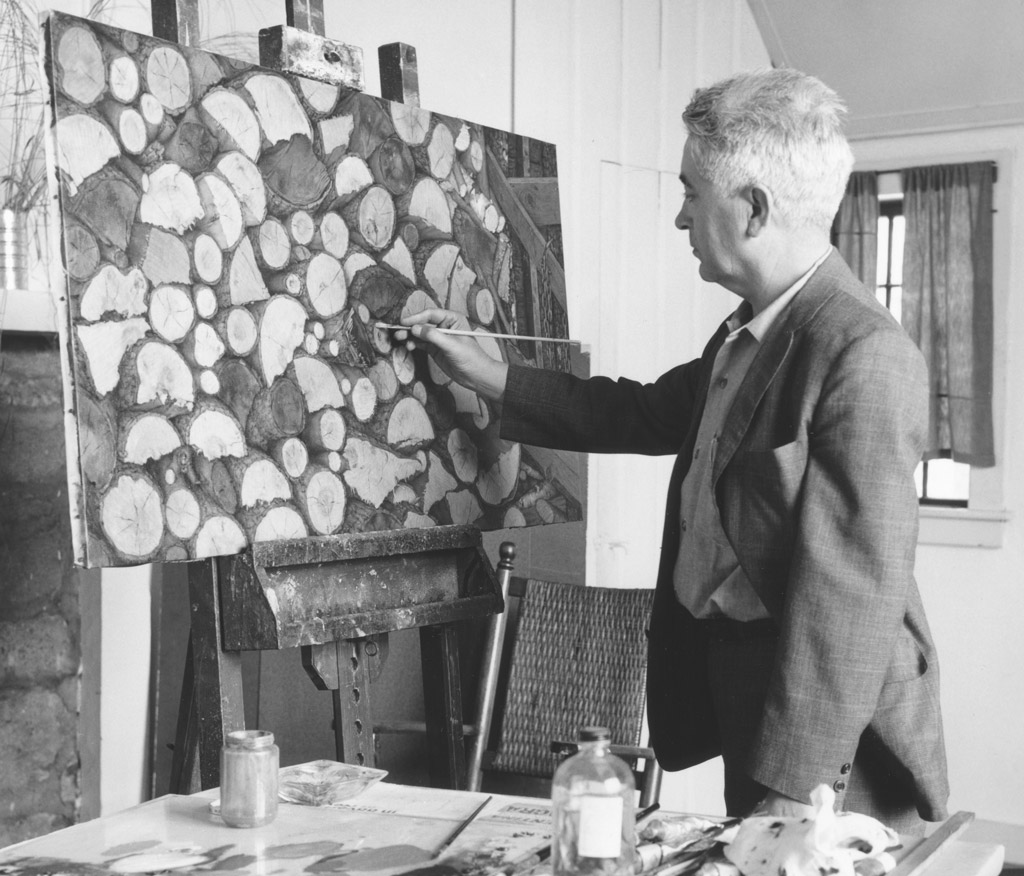
Hnizdovsky painting at the MacDowell Colony in Peterborough, New Hampshire in the early 60s

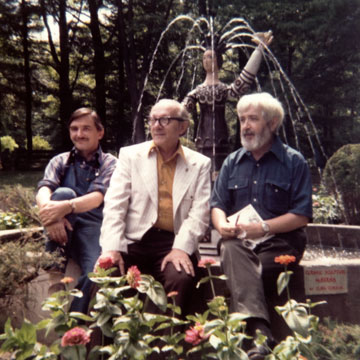
Hnizdovsky (right) with Lubomyr Hutsaliuk (left) and Edward Kozak in Soyuzivka

Jacques Hnizdovsky was born on January 27, 1915, in Ukraine in what is now Chortkiv Raion of Ternopil Oblast in a priestly family of noble origin bearing the Korab coat of arms. He was the youngest of seven children and the only member of his family that was able to emigrate to the west.

He began his fine arts studies at the Academy of Fine Arts in Warsaw. Germany's invasion of Poland and bombardment of Warsaw forced Jacques to flee Warsaw and continue his studies at the Academy of Fine Arts in Zagreb. He was classically trained and had a great interest in portraiture, but Hnizdovsky was entirely self-taught in the art of printmaking.

Hnizdovsky created hundreds of paintings, pen and ink drawings and watercolors, as well as over 377 woodcuts, etchings and linocuts after his move to the United States in 1949. He was greatly inspired by woodblock printing in Japan as well as the woodcuts of Albrecht Dürer. Influences on his early works can be seen on his website.

Hnizdovsky printed all his woodcuts and linocuts himself at his home studio. Woodcuts and linocuts were printed on washi, which is erroneously translated as "rice paper"

Hnizdovsky's prints frequently depict flora and fauna, and there are several reasons for him largely shifting his focus from the human form. His first few years in the United States were marred by financial difficulties, language difficulties and a creative crisis. But what at first were merely substitutes for the human form. later became his most cherished subjects. He was well known in all the botanical and zoological gardens in New York, where he would find subjects willing to pose at no cost. At the Bronx Zoo, he found many models that were willing to pose "for peanuts". Andy, the orangutan, who opened the Ape House of the Bronx Zoo when he was just a baby, was one of Hnizdovsky's favorite models. When Andy died, the Bronx Zoo immediately purchased the Hnizdovsky woodcut in remembrance of Andy. Another favorite Bronx Zoo model was the sheep. Hnizdovsky's The Sheep would become his best known print, illustrating the poster for his very successful exhibition at the Lumley Cazalet Gallery in London. This poster, incidentally, can be seen in the kitchen scene of the film The Hours.

Hnizdovsky has exhibited widely and his works are in the permanent collections of many museums worldwide. The Museum of Fine Arts in Boston has a large collection of his prints, as does the University of Mount Olive in North Carolina, which presumably has the largest collection of Hnizdovsky prints worldwide.

Hnizdovsky designed numerous book covers and illustrated many books. He also designed several postage stamps and a souvenir sheet for the Ukrainian Plast postal service (issued in 1954 and 1961).

Jacques Hnizdovsky died on November 8, 1985, in Bronxville, New York, and is buried at the Lychakivskiy Cemetery in Lviv, Ukraine. His archives are housed at the Slavic and Baltic Division of the New York Public Library.

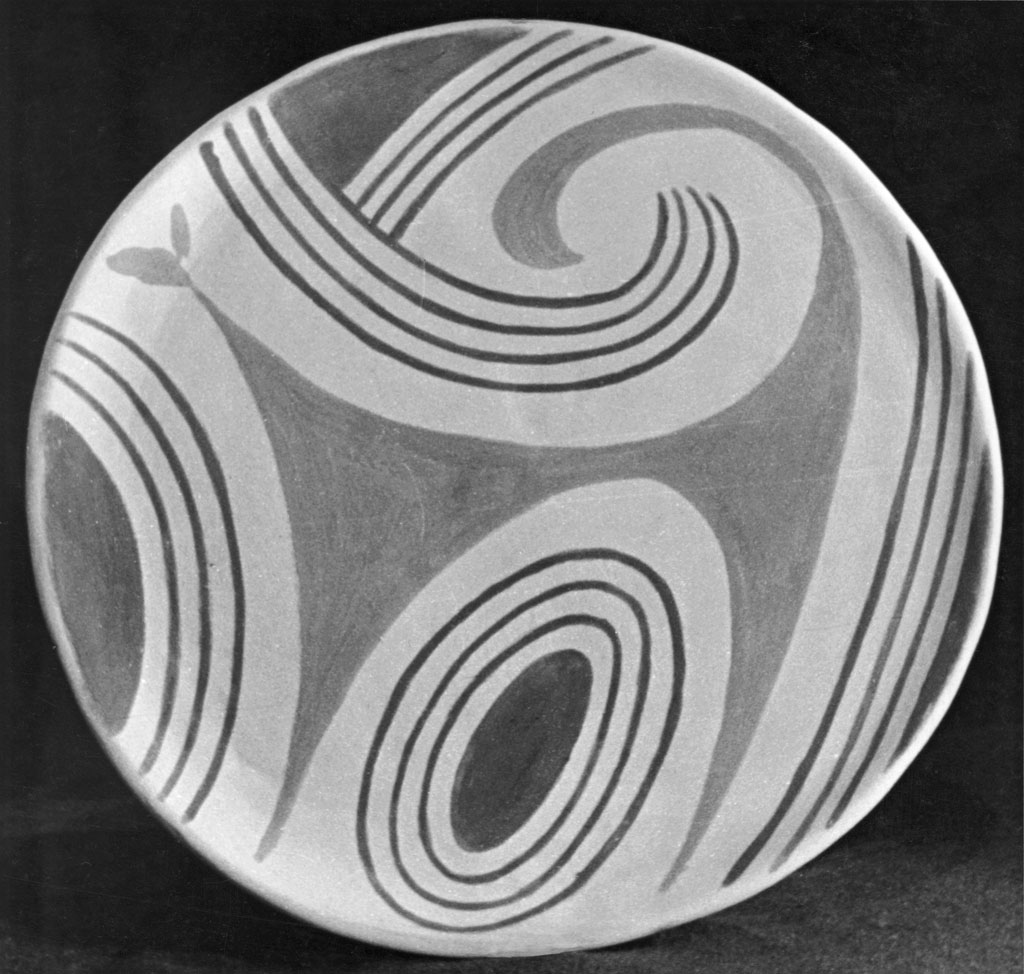
Jacques Hnizdovsky terra-cotta, 1950s

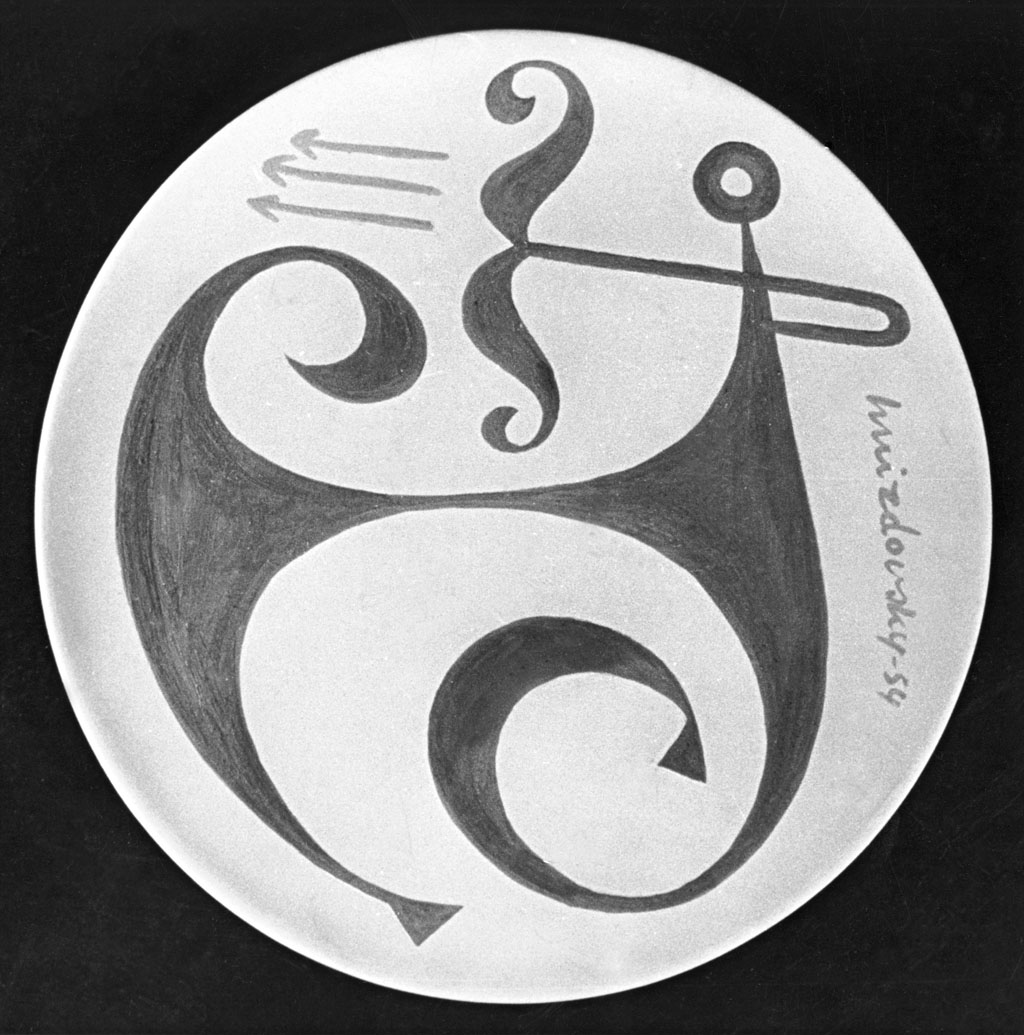
Jacques Hnizdovsky terra-cotta, 1950s

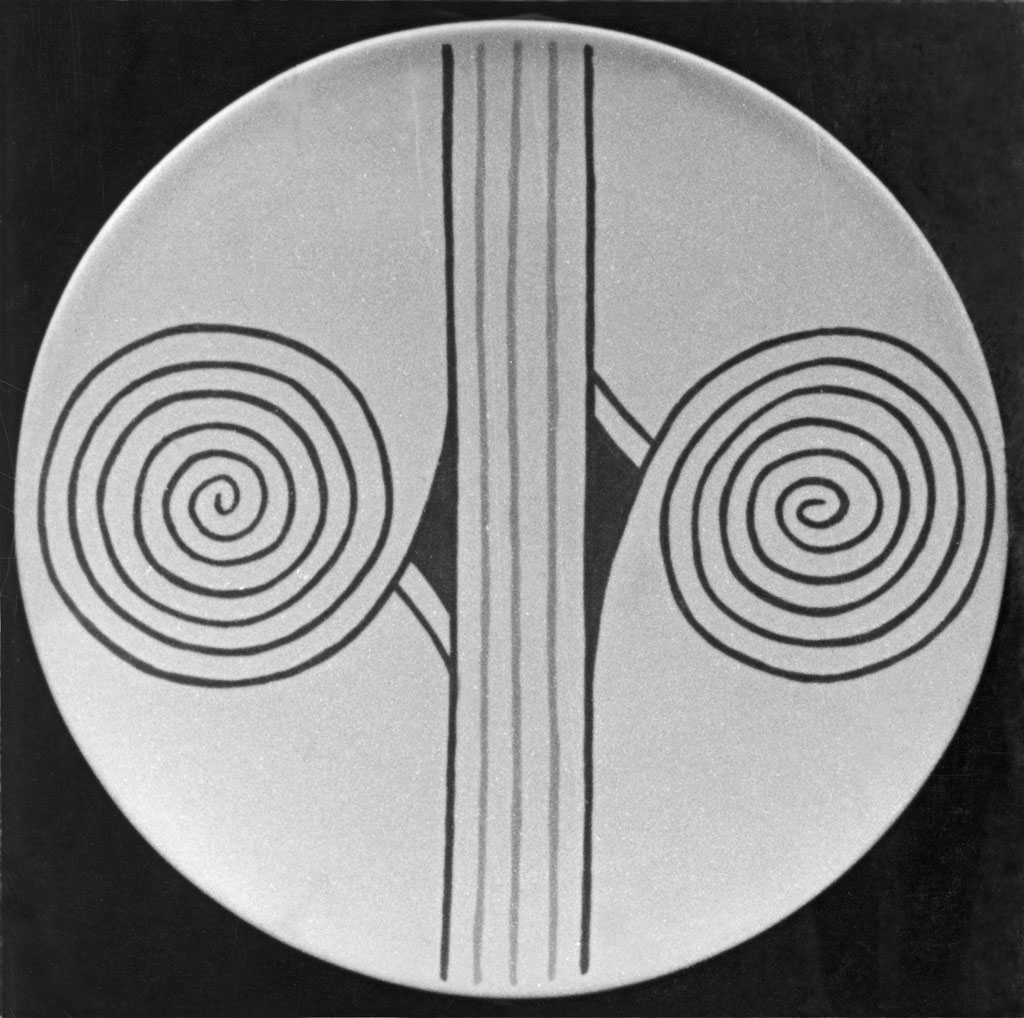
Jacques Hnizdovsky terra-cotta, 1950s

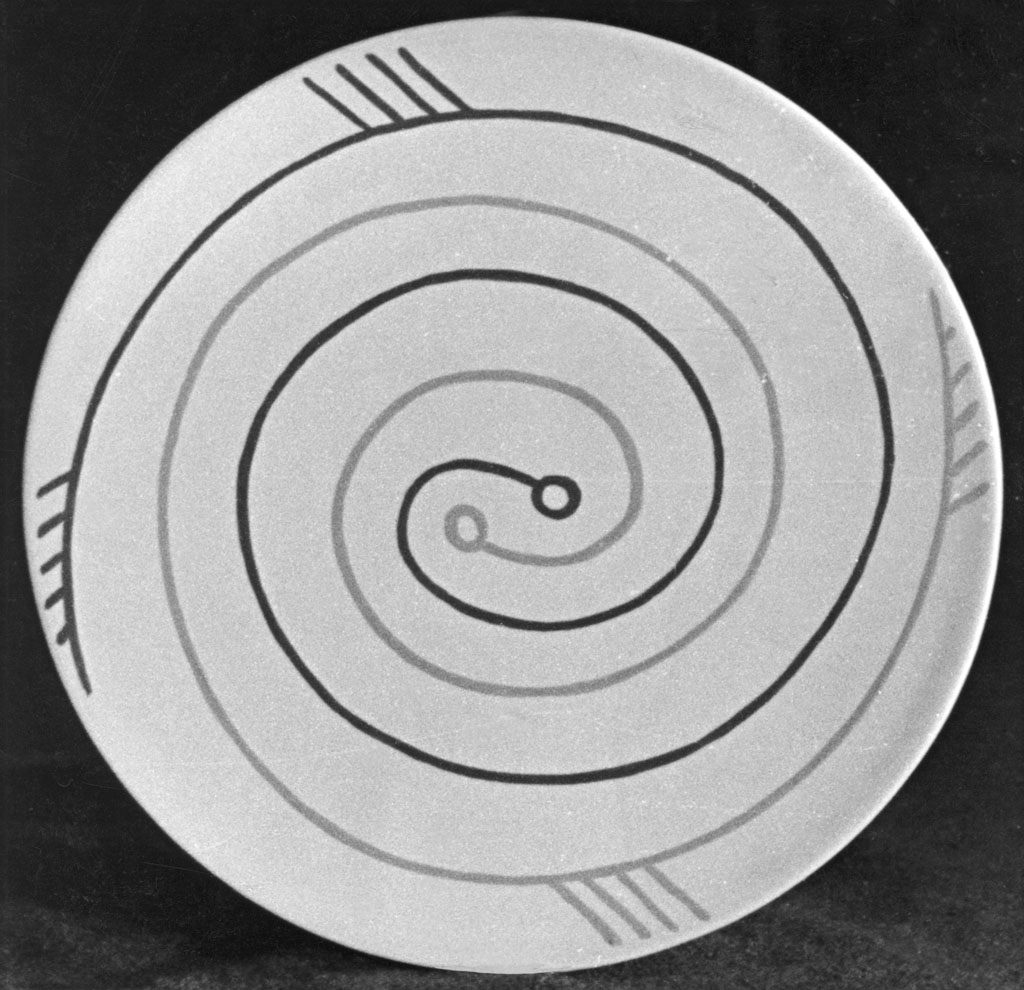
Jacques Hnizdovsky terra-cotta, 1950s

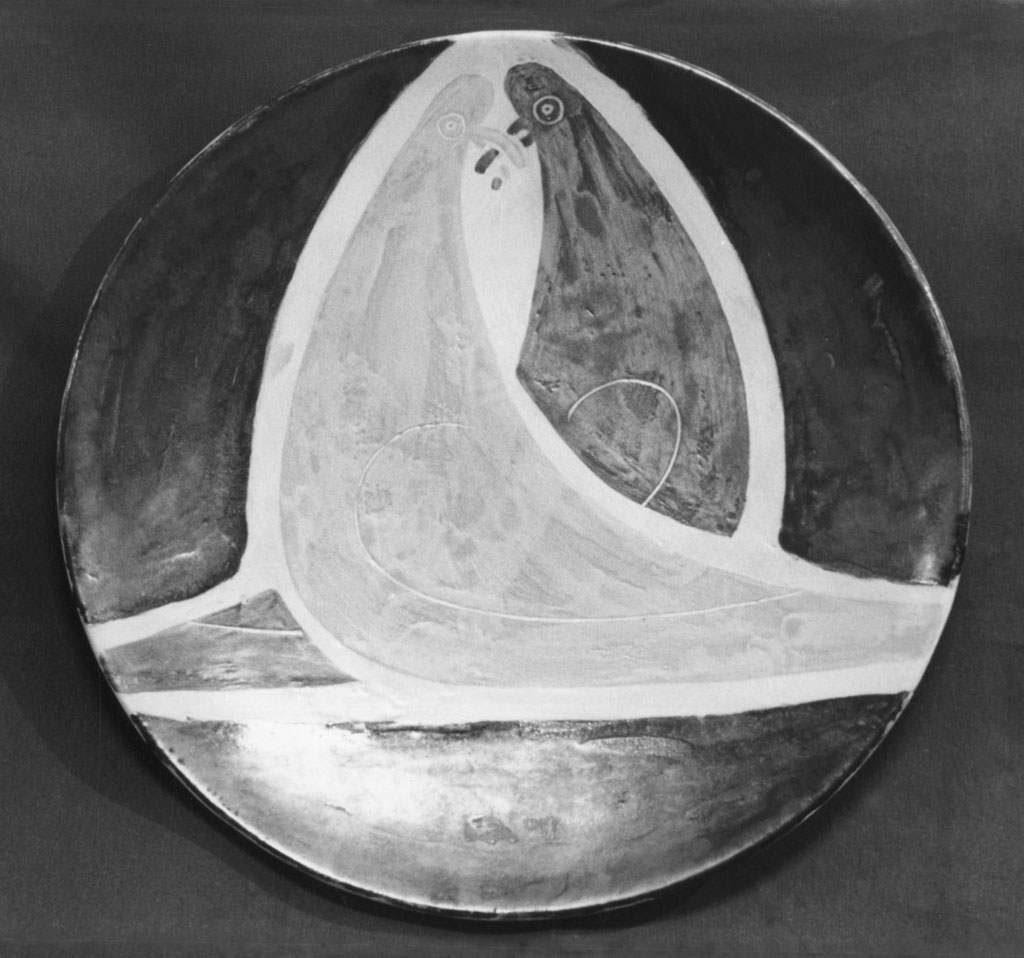
Jacques Hnizdovsky terra-cotta, 1950s

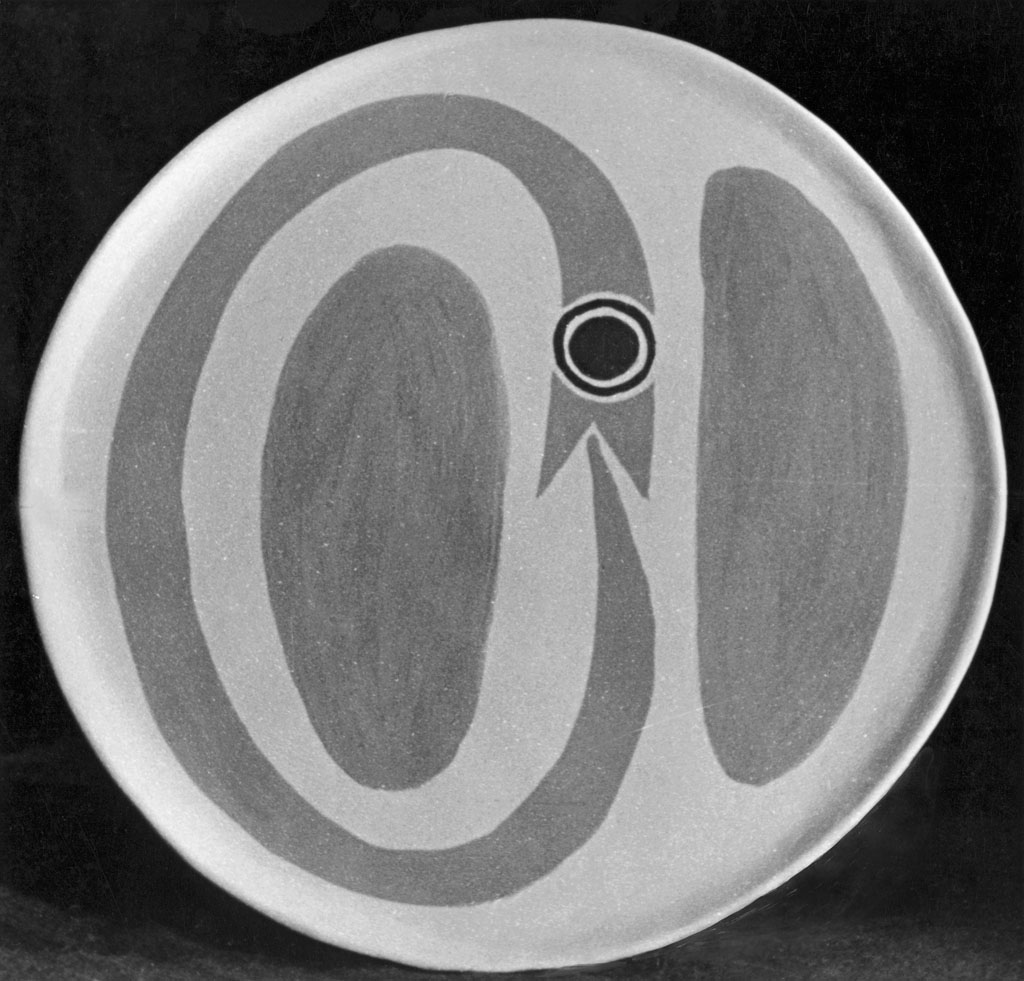
Jacques Hnizdovsky terra-cotta, 1950s

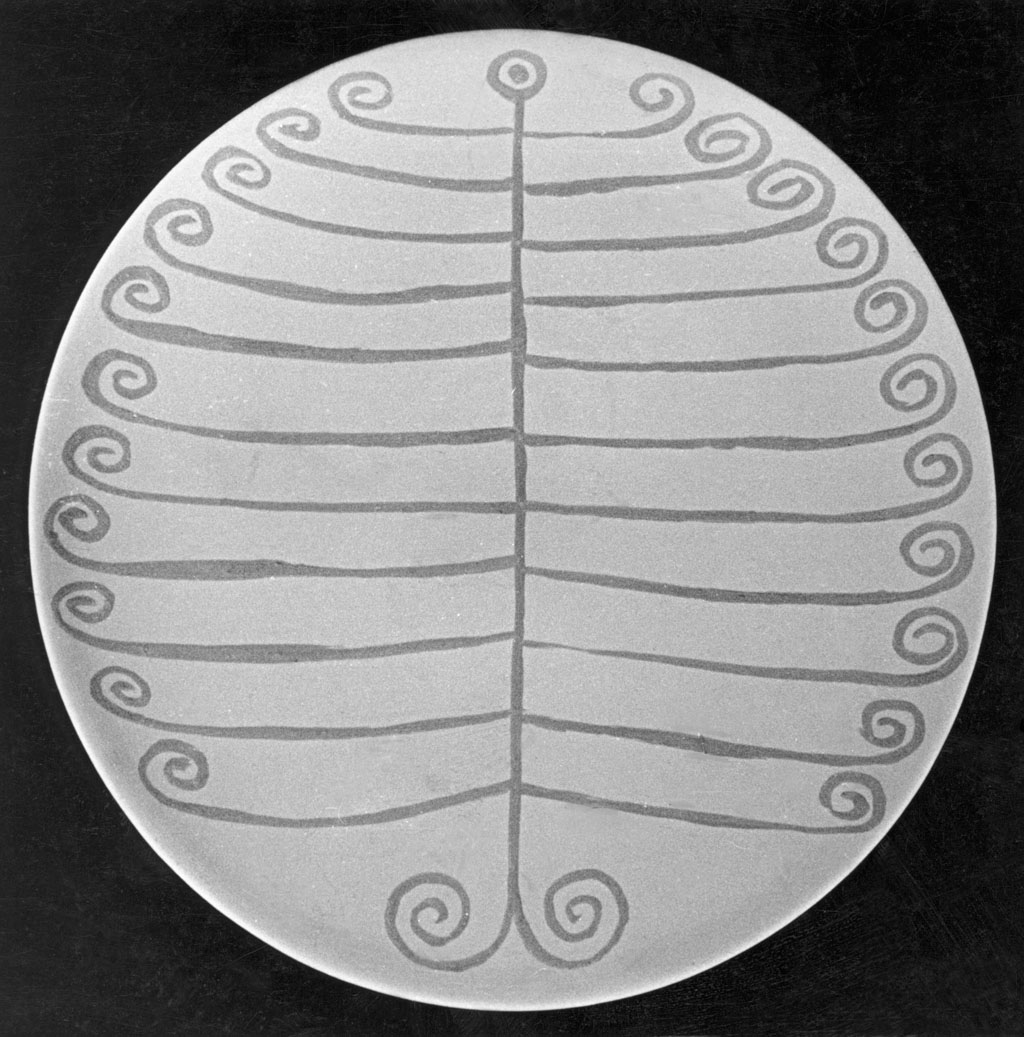
Jacques Hnizdovsky terra-cotta, 1950s

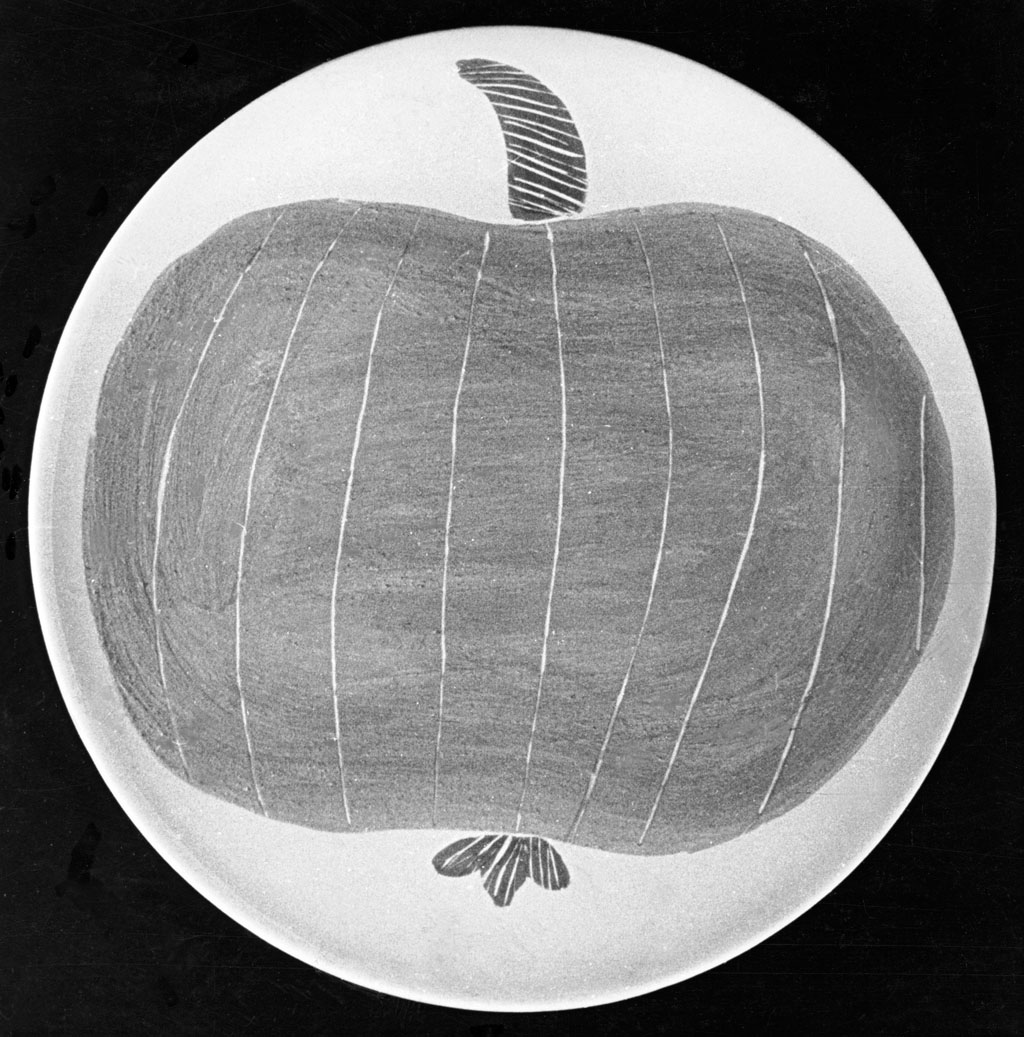
Jacques Hnizdovsky terra-cotta, 1950s

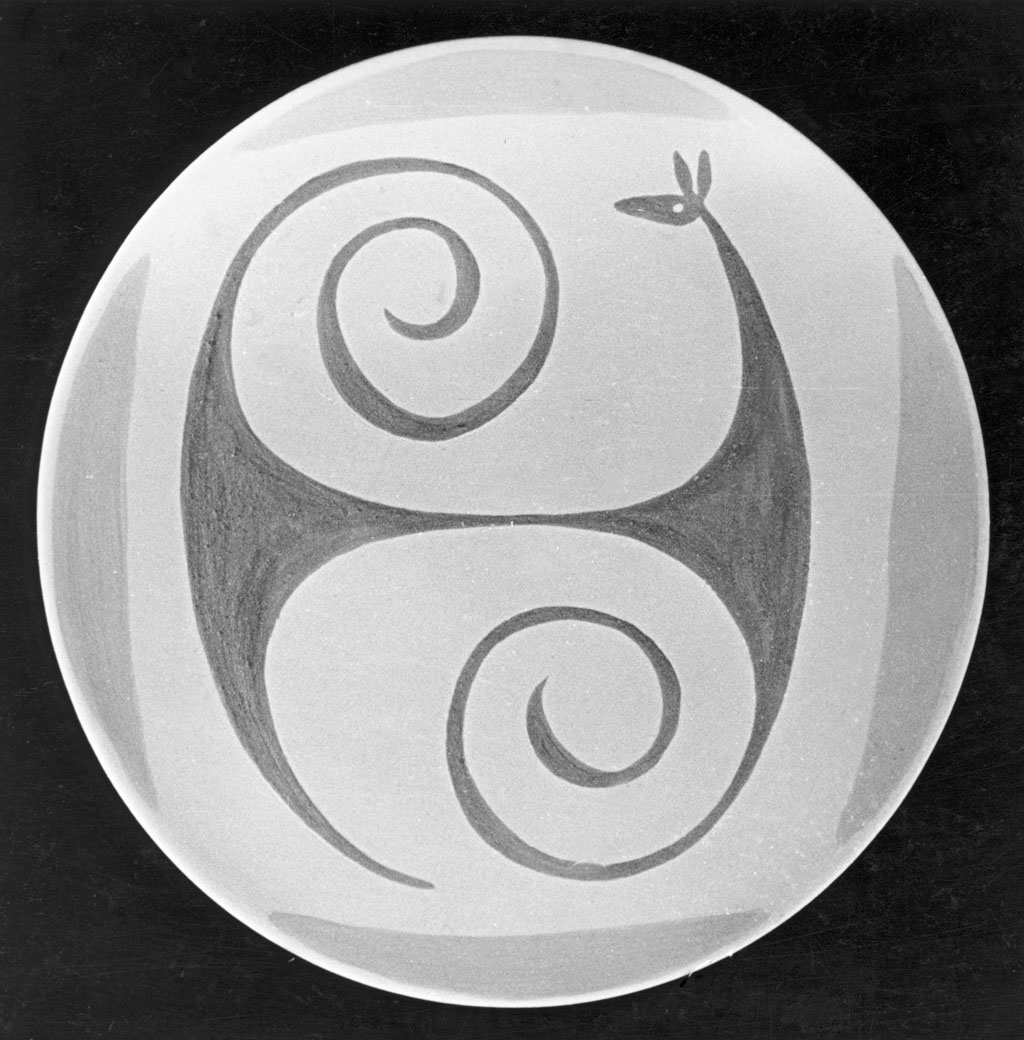
Jacques Hnizdovsky terra-cotta, 1950s

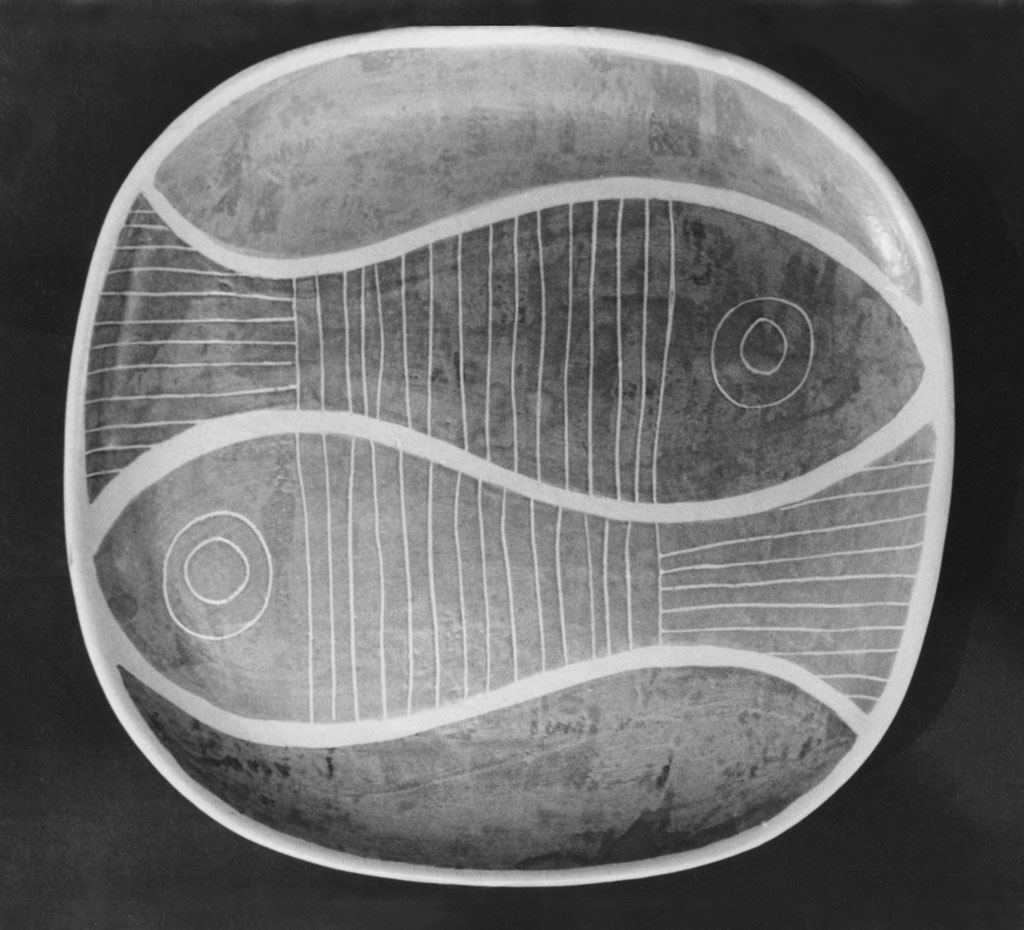
Jacques Hnizdovsky terra-cotta, 1950s

== Books illustrating the work of Hnizdovsky ==
- Tahir, Abe M. Jr (1987). Jacques Hnizdovsky Woodcuts and Etchings. Pelican Publishing Co. ISBN 0-88289-487-0.

Shows all prints created during the artist's lifetime, a catalogue raisonné, profusely illustrated with images.

- Tahir, Abe M. Jr (1975). Hnizdovsky Woodcuts 1944-1975, a Catalogue Raissonné. Pelican Publishing Co.. ISBN 0-88289-149-9, ISBN 0-88289-072-7, ISBN 0-88289-150-2.

Shows prints created between 1944-1975, a catalogue raisonné, profusely illustrated with images.

- Hnizdovsky, Jacques (1986). Jacques Hnizdovsky Ex Libris. S. Hnizdovsky. ASIN B0007BYZ94

Shows 54 Ex Libris designs that the artist created for family, collectors, museums and libraries.

== Publications ==
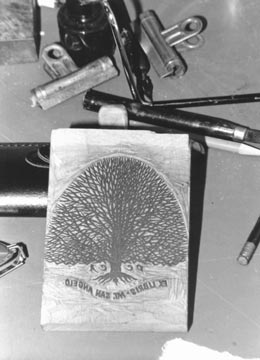
Hnizdovsky carving an ex libris (bookplate)

A partial list of books illustrated by Jacques Hnizdovsky.

- The Poems of John Keats, 1964
- Ukrainian Folk Tales, 1964
- The Auk, the Dodo, and the Oryx, 1967
- The Poems of Samuel Taylor Coleridge, 1967
- Tree Trails of Central Park, 1971
- Flora Exotica, 1972
- The Poems of Thomas Hardy, 1979
- The Traveler's Tree, 1980
- The Poetry of Robert Frost, 1981
- Signum Et Verbum, 1981
- A Green Place, 1982
- The Violin of Monsieur Ingres, 1983
- Jacques Hnizdovsky Ex Libris, 1986
- Birds and Beasts, 1990
- Behind the King's Kitchen, 1992
- The Girl in Glass, 2002
- The Adventurous Gardener, 2005

== Public collections ==
Among the public collections holding works by Jacques Hnizdovsky are:

Name	Location
Addison Gallery of American Art	Andover, Massachusetts
Borshchiv Regional Museum,	Borshchiv, Ukraine
Burnaby Art Gallery,	Burnaby, British Columbia
Butler Institute of American Art,	Youngstown, Ohio
Chrysler Museum	Norfolk, Virginia
Cleveland Museum of Art,	Cleveland, Ohio
Davison Art Center at Wesleyan University,	Middletown, Connecticut
Duke University Museum of Art,	Durham, North Carolina
Dulin Gallery of Art,	Knoxville, TN
Hunts Institute for Botanical Documentation	Pittsburgh PA
Henry Art Gallery, University of Washington	Seattle WA
Lauren Rogers Museum of Art	Laurel MS
Library of Congress	Washington DC
Louisiana Arts and Science Center	Baton Rouge LA
Louisiana State Museum	New Orleans LA
Minneapolis Institute of Arts	Minneapolis MN
Mississippi Museum of Art	Jackson MS
Museum of Fine Arts	Boston MA
National Collection of Fine Arts	Washington DC
National Museum of Lviv	Lviv, Ukraine
National Museum of Ukrainian Fine Arts	Kyiv, Ukraine
New Orleans Museum of Art	New Orleans LA
New York Public Library	New York NY
Philadelphia Museum of Art	Philadelphia PA
Temopil Regional Museum	Ternopil, Ukraine
Tweed Museum of Art University of Minnesota	Duluth MN
Ukrainian Canadian Art Foundation	Toronto, ON
Ukrainian Institute of Modern Art	Chicago IL
The Ukrainian Museum	New York NY
The Ukrainian Museum-Archives	Cleveland, OH
University of Delaware	Newark DE
University of Minnesota	Minneapolis MN
University of Mount Olive	Mount Olive NC
United States Information Agency	Washington DC
Virginia Museum of Fine Arts	Richmond VA
The White House	Washington DC
Winnipeg Art Gallery	Winnipeg MB
Yale University	New Haven CT

== Awards ==
- Associated American Artists, 1959, 1962, 1964, 1965, 1970, 1972, 1974, 1975, 1979, 1982, 1983
- Ben and Beatrice Goldstein Foundation, 1973
- Boston Museum of Fine Arts, 1961
- Boston Printmakers, 1962
- Davison Art Center, Wesleyan University, 1969
- Henry Ward Ranger Award, National Academy of Design, 1963
- International Graphic Arts Society, 1964, 1969, 1970
- MacDowell Colony Fellowship, 1963, 1971, 1976
- Minneapolis Institute of Art, 1950
- Ossabaw Foundation, 1980
- Salmagundi Club Award, Audubon Artists Annual, 1975, 1982
- Tiffany Foundation Fellowship, 1961
- Virginia Center for the Creative Arts Fellowship, 1979, 1981, 1982, 1983, 1984
- Yaddo Fellowship, 1978, 1979

In November 2022, as part of a derussification campaign, Kyiv's Magnitogorsk Street was renamed to Jacques Hnizdovsky Street.

== One-Man Shows ==
- Associated American Artists, New York NY, 1971, 1979, 1986
- Bronx Museum of the Arts, Bronx NY, 1971, 1981
- Burnaby Art Gallery, Vancouver BC, 1985
- Butler Institute of American Art, Youngstown OH, 1962
- Chapman Gallery, Canberra, Australia. 1982
- Chrysler Museum at Norfolk VA, 1967, 1968
- Creuze Gallery, Paris, 1957
- Davison Art Center, Wesleyan University, Middletown CT 1970
- Eggleston Gallery, New York NY 1954, 1958
- Emilie Walter Galleries, Vancouver BC, 1973
- Hermitage Museum and Gardens, Norfolk VA, 1981
- International Institute of Minnesota, Saint Paul MN, 1972
- Jane Haslem Gallery, Washington DC, 1982, 1984
- La Maison Francaise, NYU, New York NY, 1960
- Long Beach Museum of Art, Long Beach CA, 1977
- Lumley Cazalet Gallery, London, England, 1969, 1972, 1982
- Lviv Museum of Ukrainian Art, Lviv, Ukraine, 1990
- National Museum of Ukrainian Fine Arts, Kyiv, Ukraine, 1990
- Philadelphia Art Alliance, Philadelphia PA1961
- Pratt Institute, Brooklyn, NY, 1970
- Roberson Center for the Arts and Sciences, Binghamton, NY, 1974
- Salpeter Gallery, New York NY, 1960, 1961, 1962, 1964
- Sweet Briar College, Sweet Briar VA, 1984
- Tahir Gallery, New Orleans, 1967, 1971, 1974, 1976
- Ternopil Natural History Museum, Temopil, Ukraine, 1990
- Troup Gallery, Dallas TX, 1966, 1971
- Tryon Fine Art Center, Tryon NC, 1974
- Ukrainian Canadian Art Foundation, Toronto, ON, 1983, 1985
- Ukrainian Institute of Modern Art, Chicago IL, 1978, 1985
- University of Mount Olive, NC, 1972, 1984
- University of Virginia, Charlottesville VA, 1978, 1980, 1982, 1986
- Van Straaten Gallery, Chicago IL, 1971 (currently Denver CO)
- Virginia Center for the Creative Arts, Sweet Briar VA, 1979, 1981
- Westwood Gallery, Westwood, MA, 1973
- Winnipeg Art Gallery, Winnipeg MB, 1973
- Yale University, New Haven CT, 1977

== Traveling One-Man Shows ==
- Burnaby Art Gallery, Burnaby BC, 1985-1986
- Fendrick Gallery, Washington DC, 1987
- United States Information Service, Kyiv, 1995-1996
- Virginia Museum of Fine Arts, Richmond VA, 1987-1992
- Winnipeg Art Gallery, Winnipeg MB, 1973

== Group exhibitions ==
- Audubon Artists, 1975
- Boston Printmakers, 1962
- National Academy of Design, 1963, 1973, 1976, 1977, 1980
- Pratt Graphic Center, 1975-1985
- Society of American Graphic Artists, 1965-1985
- Triennale Internazionale della Xilografia, 1972
- Taipei Fine Arts Museum, Taiwan, 1983, 1985
- US Information Agencies in Europe, Asia, South America and Africa, 1963, 1965, 1967, 1968
