= Oleh Loshniv =

Ukrainian painter, graphic artist, and educator (1887–1934)

- Олег Лошнів
- Born: 24 November 1887; Ternopil
- Died: after 1934
- Education: Kraków Academy of Arts, Vienna Academy of Arts
- Occupations: Painter, graphic artist, and educator

Oleh Loshniv (Ukrainian: Олег Лошнів; 24 November 1887 – after 1934) was a Ukrainian painter, graphic artist, and educator. He was the author of the coat of arms of the West Ukrainian People's Republic.

== Biography ==
Oleh Loshniv was born on 24 November 1887, in Ternopil.

He studied at the Ternopil Ukrainian Gymnasium. In 1907, he graduated from the Kraków Academy of Arts (his specialized teacher was Teodor Axentowicz), and later from the Vienna Academy of Arts. Until 1930, he studied at the Oleksa Novakivskyi Art School, where he attended drawing lectures.

From 1916, he was a set designer for the Ukrainska Besida Theatre.

In the 1920s, he worked as a teacher of evening drawing courses at the Lviv Ukrainian Academic Gymnasium. In 1933, in Lviv, he became a member of the editorial board of the art almanac "Karby".

He died after 1934.

== Creativity ==
In 1916, he began participating in exhibitions in Lviv, including the 3rd exhibition of the Ukrainian Society of Art Patrons (1934), as well as the "Exhibition of Four" (Hryhorii Smolskyi, Ivanna Nyzhnyk, Oleh Loshniv, and Petro Obal; 1937).

In the artist's works, one can observe a somewhat dry, realistic plasticity of forms. He also experimented with creating in the Cubist style ("Composition", 1934).

Among his works are:

- a series of watercolor landscapes — "Pidlvivski motyvy";
- portraits — "Yakiv Strukhmanchuk", "Oleksa Novakivskyi" (both from 1934);
- charcoal drawings.

== Bibliography ==
- L. Voloshyn (2024). "Лошнів Олег". Мистецька школа Олекси Новаківського 1923-1935. Життя у перспективі часу (in Ukrainian). Lviv–Drohobych: Kolo. p. 389. ISBN 978-617-642-676-9.
