= Mariia Krompets-Morachevska =

Ukrainian painter (1897–1960)

- Марія Петрівна Кромпець-Морачевська
- Born: 10 April 1897; Sokolivka, Austria-Hungary (now Ukraine)
- Died: 3 November 1960 (aged 63); USA
- Education: Oleksa Novakivskyi Art School, University of Lviv
- Occupations: Artist of decorative and applied arts, a painter, and a teacher

Mariia Krompets-Morachevska (Ukrainian: Марія Петрівна Кромпець-Морачевська; 10 April 1897 – 3 November 1960) was a Ukrainian artist of decorative and applied arts, a painter, and a teacher. Wife of Yurii Morachevskyi, mother of Sofiia Morachevska-Temnytska.

== Biography ==
Mariia Krompets-Morachevska was born on 10 April 1897 in Sokolivka (now Zolochiv Raion of the Lviv Oblast).

In 1922–1923, she attended lectures at the Lviv Art and Industrial School. In 1926, she graduated from the Oleksa Novakivskyi Art School, and in 1929 from the Faculty of Philosophy at University of Lviv.

She worked in various positions, in particular, from 1922 at the Lviv Ukrainian Women's Gymnasium of the Basilian Sisters; at the same time at the Lviv Private Teachers' Seminary for Women, the Lviv Women's Humanist Seminary of the Ridna Shkola Society; in 1941–1943 she headed the textile department of the Lviv Art and Industrial School. In 1945–1948, she was a design artist at the Maria Zankovetska Ukrainian Drama Theater, where she created theatrical costumes together with Eleia Olesnytska.

From 1948 she lived in Vienna, and in 1950 she emigrated to Philadelphia (USA), where she worked as a teacher at the St. Nicholas Church from 1950 to 1958. She took an active part in the Ukrainian community of the city. She was a member of the Ukrainian National Women's League of America and the World Federation of Ukrainian Women's Organizations.

She died on 3 November 1960 in a car accident. She was buried in Philadelphia (USA).

== Creativity ==
From 1926 she participated in exhibitions. In her works, she preserved the national style in modern life. She used samples of folk art in napkins, curtains, and carpets, and popularized them in the 1930s in the publications of the Nova Khata magazine.

Her works include painting studies, landscapes ("Blossoming Apple Tree", 1925), still lifes, and portraits. She wrote a memoir about Oleksa Novakivskyi, which was published in 1935 in the magazine "Nova Hata". She had several students, including: Ivanna Nyzhnyk-Vynnykiv, Vira Svientsitska, Yevheniia Chapelska-Kurylovych, and Olena Verhanovska.

== Bibliography ==
- L. Voloshyn (2024). "Кромпець-Морачевська Марія". Мистецька школа Олекси Новаківського 1923-1935. Життя у перспективі часу (in Ukrainian). Lviv–Drohobych: Kolo. p. 252—253, 379—380. ISBN 978-617-642-676-9.
