= Saint Michael Church, Stara Skvariava =

Church in Lviv Oblast, Ukraine

Saint Michael Church
- Церква Святого Архистратига Михаїла
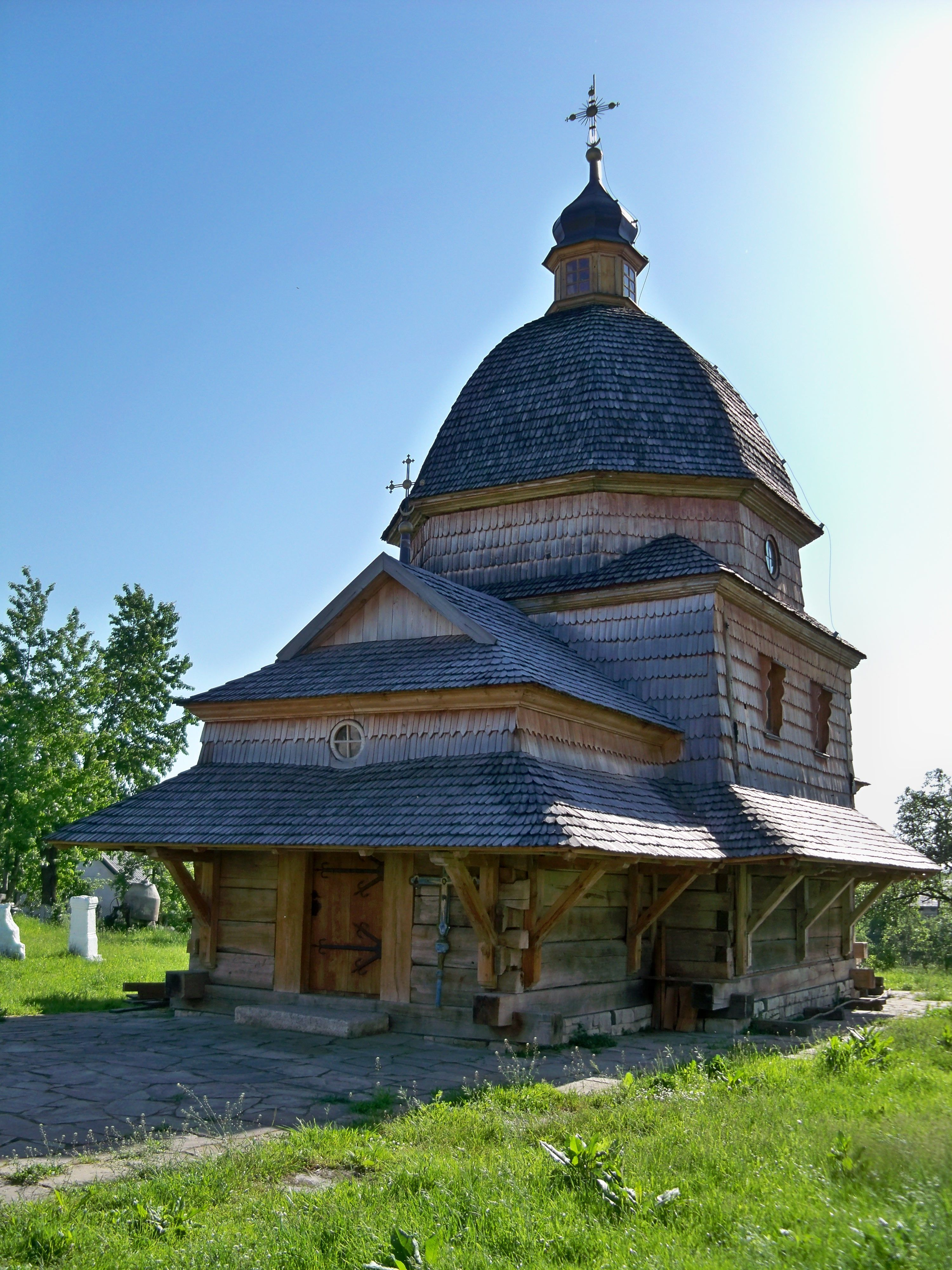

- Location within Lviv Oblast

Religion
- Affiliation: Ukrainian Greek Catholic Church
- Ecclesiastical or organisational status: Architectural monument of local importance

Location
- Location: Stara Skvariava, Zhovkva urban hromada, Lviv Raion, Lviv Oblast, Ukraine
- Coordinates: 50°02′24″N 23°57′00″E

Architecture
- Completed: 1508

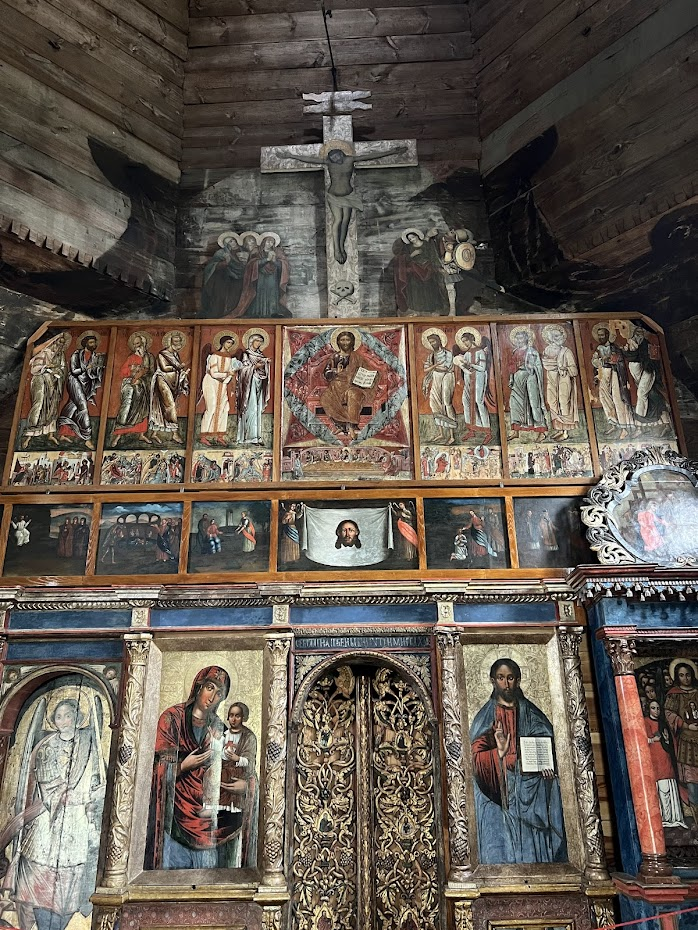
Staroskvariavskyi iconostasis

Saint Michael Church (Ukrainian: Церква Святого Архистратига Михаїла) is a Greek Catholic parish wooden church (UGCC) in Stara Skvariava of the Zhovkva urban hromada, Lviv Raion, Lviv Oblast. Architectural monument of local importance

== History ==
The three-domed wooden church was first mentioned in writing in 1578. It had a throne with an antimension from Bishop Athanasius Sheptytsky. In 1715 it burned down. A wooden church from the village of Hlynsk, Lviv Raion, was moved to its place.

In 2008, researcher Vasyl Slobodian discovered the year 1508 on the wall of the church's nave, which is the date of construction of the shrine.

In 1947–1989, the church was closed by the Soviet authorities. In 2009–2014, the church was restored with wood shingles (designed by architect Serhii Pinkovskyi, and was renovated by I. Bukhanskyi). Next to the wooden church, a stone church of the Archangel Michael was built in the early 1990s and consecrated in 1995 (architects Sviatoslav Krupchuk and Roman Hoshko).

In 2023, the church, along with the iconostasis, was digitized in 3D format.

=== Staroskvariavskyi iconostasis ===
In 1995–2015, the iconostasis of the 16th-18th centuries was undergoing restoration at the Museum of History of Religion in Lviv (led by Halyna Skop-Druziuk and Mariia Bonkovska). Now it is a branch of the mentioned museum institution called "Museum of the Staroskvariavskyi Iconostasis of the XVI-XVIII centuries". In the vicarage row of the iconostasis there is an icon of St. Nicholas (1687), which is associated with the Ukrainian iconographer Ivan Rutkovych.

Famous Ukrainian art historians have written about the monument, including Mykhailo Dragan in his works: "The iconostasis in Skvariava Stara is a conglomerate of icons of different times and authors, collected from different churches. The oldest part is from the 16th century – a series of apostles with "feasts" (praznychky) and "Pantocrator" (two pairs of apostles and a 16th-century Crucifix are kept in the Lviv Museum of Ukrainian Art)", as well as Vira Svientsitska: "The iconostasis consists of icons from the 16th and 17th centuries".

== Priests ==
- Teodor Bilevych (1828–1838)
- Kelestyn Kyverovych (1838–1859)
- Yakiv Zakrevskyi (1858–1859, administrator)
- Luka Oleshchuk (1859–1901)
- Yosyf Karanovych (1897–1901, assistant; 1901, administrator)
- Volodymyr Ustrysko (1901–1927)
- Stefan Haida (1928–1939)
- Stepan Makar – now.
