= Osip Sorokhtei =

Osip-Roman Iyosafatovych Sorokhtei
- Осип-Роман Йосафатович Сорохтей
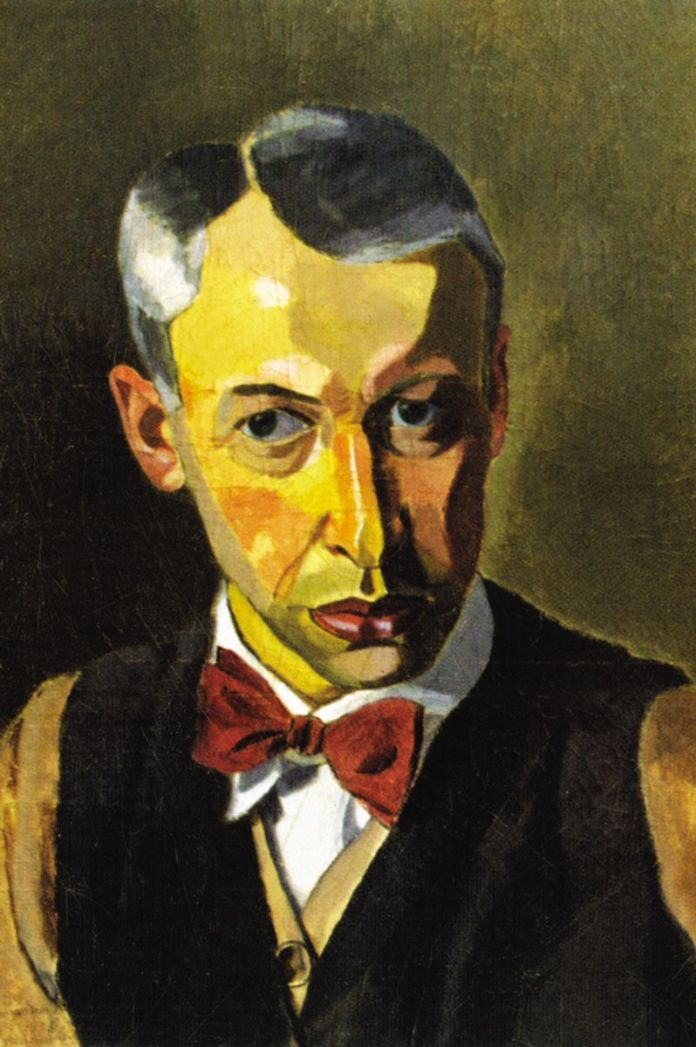
- Self-portrait, 1938
- Born: 28 February 1890 near Baranyvtsy, Sambir Raion, Galicia, Austria-Hungary
- Died: 28 November 1941 (aged 51); Ivano-Frankivsk, Ukrainian SSR, Soviet Union
- Education: Kraków Academy of Fine Arts
- Occupations: Painter, graphic artist, caricaturist, art teacher
- Years active: 1911–1941
- Known for: Religious paintings, caricatures, graphic art
- Movement: Expressionism
- Awards: Several medals (Kraków Academy of Fine Arts)

Osip-Roman Iyosafatovych Sorokhtei (Ukrainian: Осип-Роман Йосафатович Сорохтей; 28 February 1890, near Baranyvtsy, Sambir Raion – 28 November 1941, in Ivano-Frankivsk) was a Ukrainian painter, graphic artist, caricaturist and art teacher.

== Biography ==
His father was a Czech laborer who came to Galicia working on the railway. His mother was Polish. Shortly after his birth, his family moved to Stanislaus (now Ivano-Frankivsk). His father was killed in an accident shortly after and his mother had to raise the family on a railway pension.

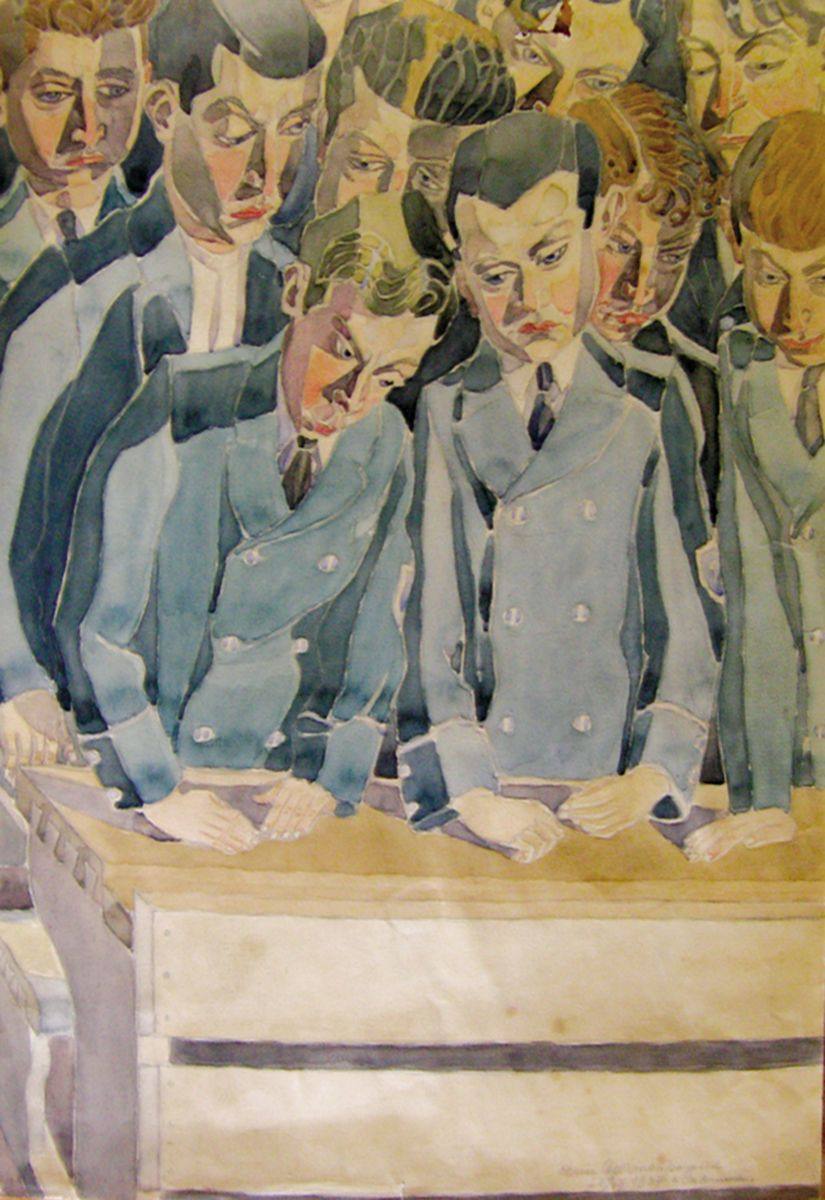
Gymnasium Students

He soon developed an interest in drawing and often snuck away from the Jesuit school, which he loathed, to take lessons from a local, unsuccessful, painter. Eventually, unable to tolerate the school, he ran away from home. When he returned, he was enrolled at the Teacher's Seminary instead, and graduated from there in 1910, although he had no intention of becoming a teacher. Instead, from 1911 to 1914, he studied at the Kraków Academy of Fine Arts, where he enrolled as a Ukrainian. While there, he was awarded several medals.

During World War I, he was drafted into the Austro-Hungarian Army and was assigned to the press corps of the Ukrainian Sich Riflemen. When he was mustered out of service in 1918, he participated in the Ukrainian War of Independence, but became disillusioned, so he returned home.

In 1919, he resumed his studies at the Academy with Yulian Pankevych, among others. After graduating, he worked as a drawing teacher; initially at the Stanislaus Ukrainian Gymnasium (1920-1926). After 1925, he was a regular contributor to the satirical magazine Zyz (Squint), published in Lviv. One of his contributions was an unflattering caricature of the school's Director, which resulted in his dismissal. He then went to teach in Sniatyn (1926-1928). While there, he met and married Mariia Karpiuk (1900-1978), a pupil of Oleksa Novakivskyi. They returned to Ivano-Frankivsk, where he had been offered a job at the gymnasium.

In 1925, he had begun a series of drawings and paintings called Golgotha, which displeased Bishop Hryhoriy Khomyshyn. Despite this, in 1935, he received a commission from the theological seminary and produced a depiction of Christ's descent from the cross. It was considered too unconventional, however and, ironically, ended up being placed in a Jesuit church.

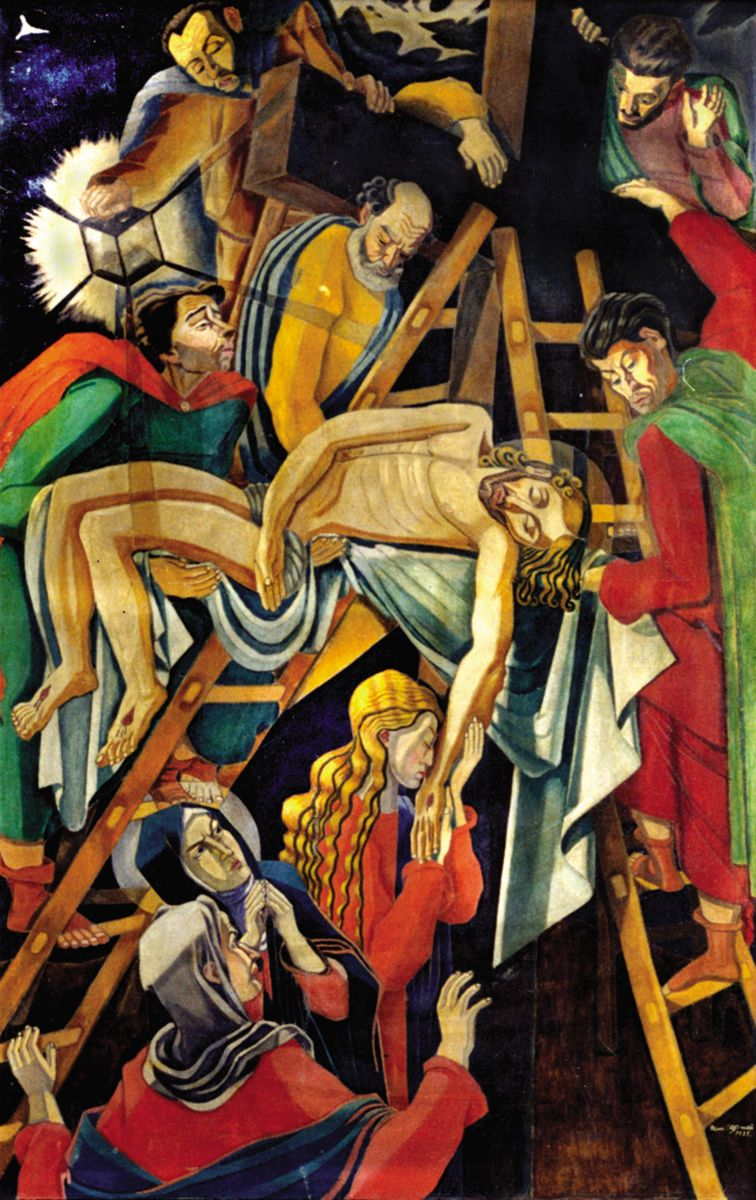
Descent from the Cross

He died of a heart attack in 1941. Major retrospectives of his work were held in Ivano-Frankivsk (1942) and Lviv (1970).

More than 1,000 works in a variety of media are known. Most are held at the Ivano-Frankivsk Regional Art Museum and the Lviv National Art Gallery. Streets are named after him in both cities.
