= Olha Maryniak =

Ukrainian graphic artist, Plast member (1904–1939)

- Ольга Мариняк
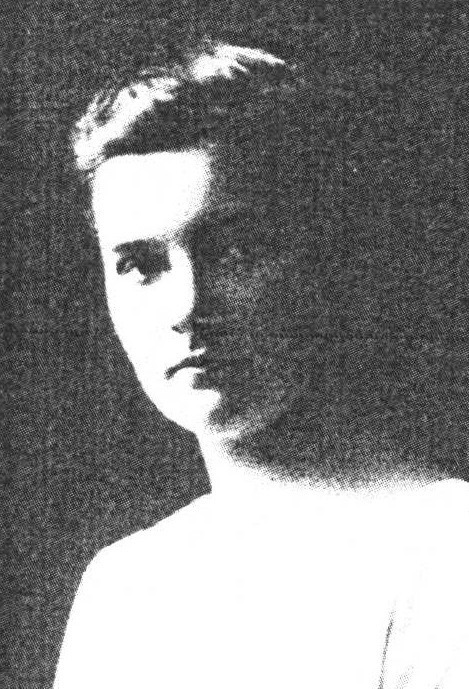
- Born: 7 September 1904; Ternopil
- Died: 20 April 1939 (aged 34); Warsaw
- Occupations: Graphic artist, Plast member

Olha Maryniak (Ukrainian: Ольга Мариняк; 7 September 1904 – 20 April 1939) was a Ukrainian graphic artist, Plast member.

== Biography ==
Olha Maryniak was born on 7 September 1904 in Ternopil.

In 1923, she graduated from the Ukrainian Gymnasium and Real School of the Sisters of St. Joseph in Ternopil, and in 1925 from the Lviv Art and Industrial School. She also attended the Oleksa Novakivskyi Art School, and in 1926–1931 studied at the Warsaw Academy of Arts (teachers Felician Kowarski, Milosz Kotarbinski, and Henryk Jastrzęmbowski).

She is active in the Plast organization. She organized a group of senior Plast members in Warsaw.

She died on 20 April 1939 in Warsaw.

== Creativity ==
She was a member of the Warsaw art group "Spokii". From 1928, she participated in art exhibitions in Warsaw (1929, 1935, 1937–1939), Lviv (1931, 1935), Lutsk, Rivne, and Kremenets (all in 1935).

She worked in the field of easel graphics (woodcut and lithography). Her works are kept in museum collections and private collections.

Main works: "Tserkva v seli Koropets", "Plastunky pry vatri", "Babtsia", "Kvity", "Vesliarky" (all from the early 1930s), "Stare misto", "Divchata" (both from the late 1930s).

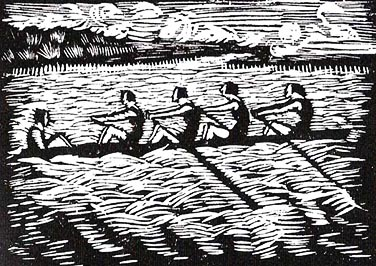
Vesliarky

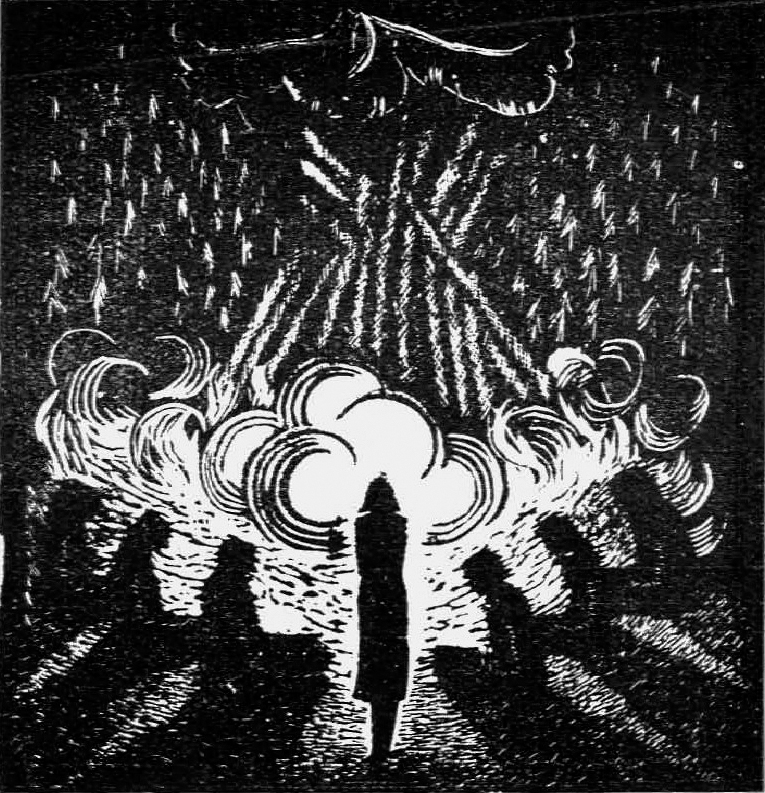
Plastunky pry varti

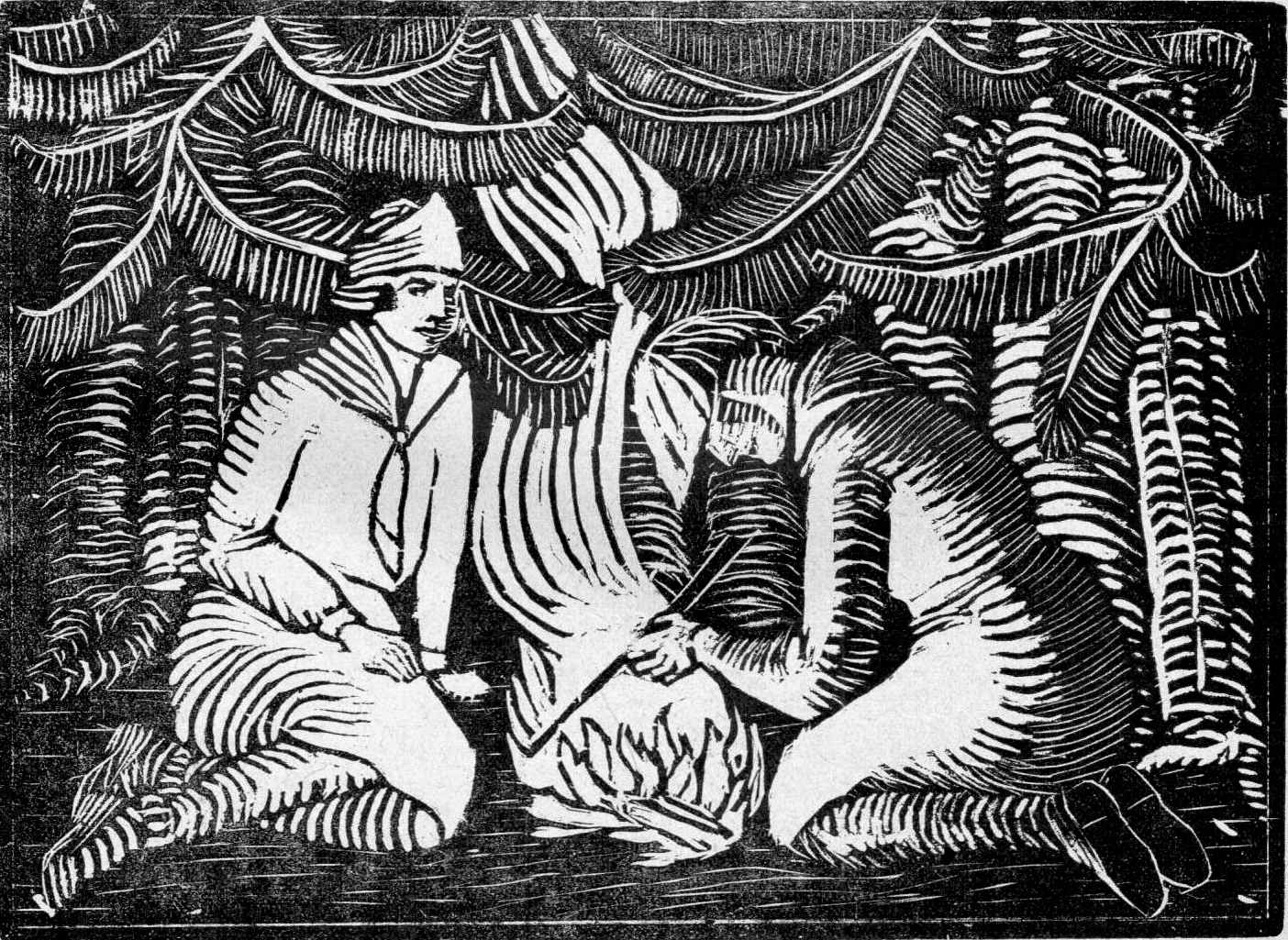
Plastunky

== Bibliography ==
- L. Voloshyn (2024). "Мариняк Ольга". Мистецька школа Олекси Новаківського 1923-1935. Життя у перспективі часу (in Ukrainian). Lviv–Drohobych: Kolo. p. 296—297, 397—398. ISBN 978-617-642-676-9.
