= Ivan Severyn =

Ukrainian painter (1881–1964)

- Іван Митрофанович Северин
- Born: 23 September 1881; Ostapivka (now Myrhorod Raion, Poltava Oblast, Ukraine)
- Died: 20 September 1964 (aged 82); Kyiv
- Education: Kraków Academy of Arts
- Occupation: Painter

Ivan Severyn (Ukrainian: Іван Митрофанович Северин. 23 September 1881 – 20 September 1964) was a Ukrainian painter, student of Opanas Slastion. Member of the Association of Revolutionary Art of Ukraine, the Union of Artists of Ukraine (1956).

== Biography ==
Ivan Severyn was born on 23 September 1881 in Ostapivka, Myrhorod district, Poltava Governorate (now Komyshnia Hromada, Myrhorod Raion, Poltava Oblast, Ukraine).

Until 1905, he studied at the Myrhorod School of Art and Industry (teacher – Opanas Slastion) and the Kharkiv School of Drawing and Painting. From 1907, he graduated from the Kraków Academy of Arts (teachers: Jan Stanisławski and Stanisław Wyspiański). Until 1913, thanks to a scholarship from Metropolitan Andrei Sheptytskyi, the artist improved his skills in the art studios of Munich, Rome, and Paris, and also studied at the Paris Academy of Arts.

In 1913, during a geographical and geological expedition, he painted the Tian Shan and Tibet.

From 1925 to 1927, he taught at an art college, and from 1927 to 1933 at the Kharkiv Art Institute. In the mid-1930s, he was arrested and exiled to the Gulag, and after Stalin's death he was rehabilitated. He died on 20 February 1964 in Kyiv.

== Creativity ==
In Ukrainian art, he belonged to the impressionist masters of the early 20th century (among them Ivan Trush, Oleksa Novakivskyi, Mykola Burachek). From 1927, he presented his works at art exhibitions. His personal vernissages took place in 1909 in Lviv (with the assistance of Metropolitan Andrey Sheptytskyi) and in 1911 in Kyiv.

Some of his works are kept in the collections of the Andrey Sheptytsky National Museum of Lviv, the Museum of Arts of Prykarpattia, and the Ivano-Frankivsk Local Museum. A significant part of the artist's works was lost during the World War II.

Among the important works:

- Painting – "Zakopane" (1907), "Vechory v Alpakh" (1908–1909), "Okolitsi Rymu" (1910), "Sutinky", "Na Ukraini", "Step Ukrainskyi", "Zymovyi vechir u Karpatakh", "Kubanskyi kozak";
- Cycles "Hutsulshchyna" (1905–1911), "Dniprovska HES" (1930–1932);
- Portraits of Taras Shevchenko, Ivan Franko, Lesia Ukrainka, and others.

== Bibliography ==
- Северин Іван // Енциклопедія українознавства : Словникова частина : [в 11 т.] / Наукове товариство імені Шевченка ; гол. ред. проф., д-р Володимир Кубійович. — Париж — Нью-Йорк : Молоде життя, 1973. — Кн. 2, [т. 7] : Пряшівщина (продовження) — Сибір. — ISBN 5-7707-4049-3.
- Юван В. Северин Іван Митрофанович // Шевченківська енциклопедія : у 6 т. / Гол. ред. М. Г. Жулинський. — Київ : Ін-т літератури ім. Т. Г. Шевченка, 2015. — Т. 5 : Пе—С. — С. 694—695.
- Мистецтво України : Біографічний довідник. / упоряд.: А. В. Кудрицький, М. Г. Лабінський ; за ред. А. В. Кудрицького. — Київ : «Українська енциклопедія» імені М. П. Бажана, 1997. — С. 700 с. . — ISBN 5-88500-071-9.
- Семчишин-Гузнер О. Мистець із зраненим серцем // Образотворче мистецтво. — 2007. — № 2. — С. 52–53.
- Ханко В. Полтавщина: плин мистецтва, діячі: Мистецтвознавчі праці. — Київ: Видавець Остап Ханко, 2007. — С. 338.
- Іван Северин (1881—1964) : альбом-каталог / [авт. вступ. ст. О. Семчишин-Гузнер]. — Львів : Каменяр, 2009. — 106 с.: ілюстр.
- Полтава історична
- Пошуковий загін "Славія"
