= Oleksa Novakivskyi Art School =

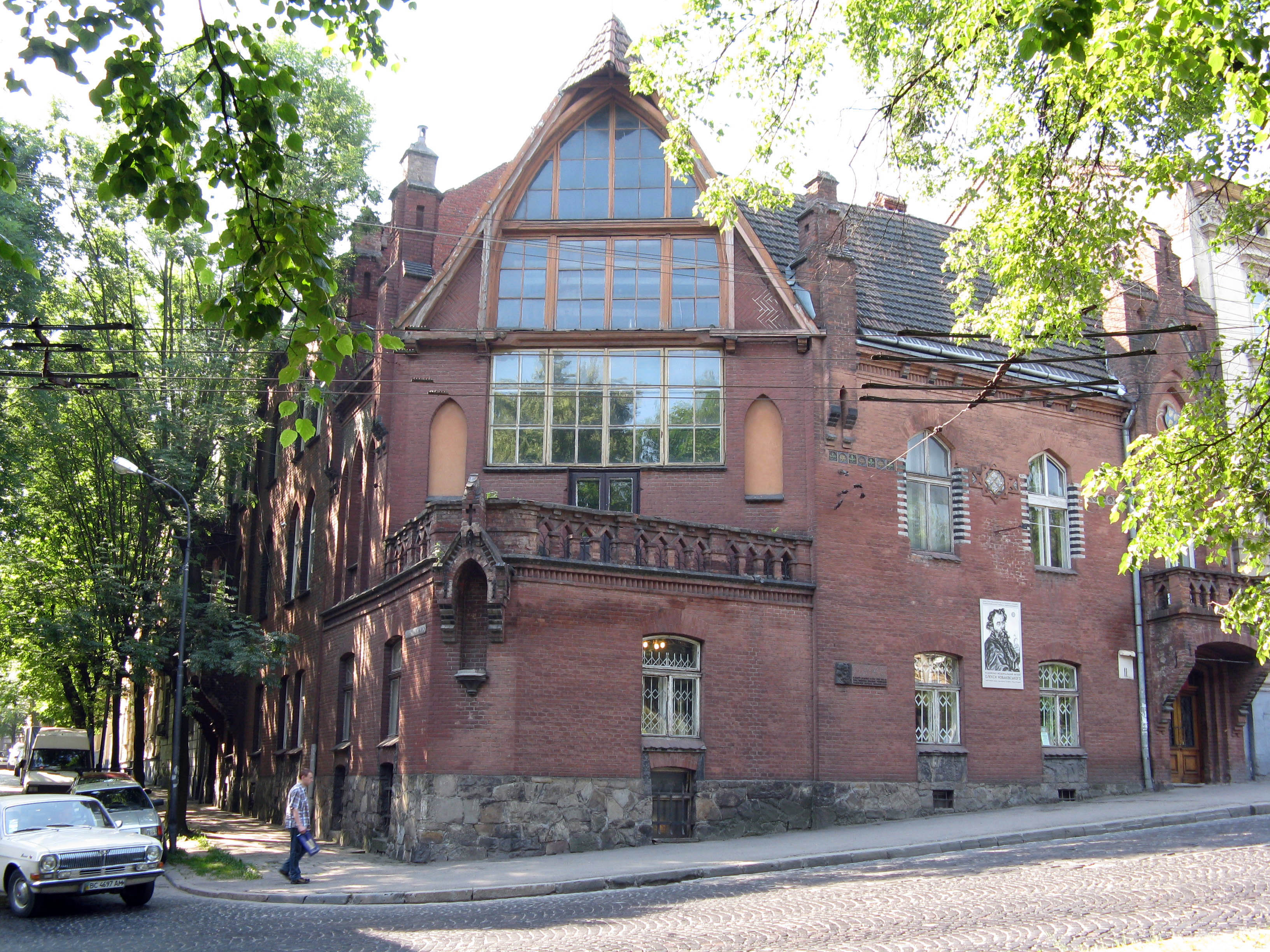
Oleksa Novakivskyi Museum in Lviv: Oleksa Novakivskyi and his family lived in this house built in the early 20th century. Now it is his museum.

The Oleksa Novakivskyi Art School was an educational institution in Lviv that operated from 1923 to 1935. It was founded on the initiative and with the financial support of Metropolitan Andrei Sheptytskyi by the artist Oleksa Novakivskyi.

Initially, the school functioned as an art department of the Secret Ukrainian University, and after 1925 it became independent. During 1925–1929, the school's students were taught by Volodymyr Zalozetskyi (art history), Volodymyr Peshchanskyi (artistic styles and color chemistry), Metropolitan Andrei Sheptytskyi (history of Ukrainian art), Ilarion Svientsitskyi (history of Ukrainian art), Osyp Kurylas (drawing), Stepan Balei (anatomy), Ivan Rakovskyi (cultural history), and Yevhen Nahirnyi (perspective). The students presented their works at exhibitions held in 1926, 1928–1929, 1930, 1932, and 1934.

In different years, 90 people studied at the school. Among the famous and prominent artists: Roman Selskyi, Sofiia Zarytska, Hryhorii Smolskyi, Mykhailo Moroz, Vasyl Diadyniuk, Antin Maliutsa, Andrii Koverko, Emiliia Okhrymovych-Holubovska, Mariia Krompets-Morachevska, Mykhailo Dragan, Sviatoslav Hordynskyi, Stefania Gebus-Baranetska, Olha Maryniak, Natalka Prystai-Ohonovska, Lev Gets, Ivanna Nyzhnyk-Vynnykiv, Mariia Karpiuk, Yaroslav Krushelnytskyi, Yaroslav Lukavetskyi, Olha Pleshkan, Stepan Lutsyk, Volodymyr Lasovskyi, Edward Kozak, and Myron Levytskyi.

Today, the Oleksa Novakivskyi Memorial Art Museum operates in the school's building.

== Bibliography ==
- L. Voloshyn (2024). Мистецька школа Олекси Новаківського 1923-1935. Життя у перспективі часу (in Ukrainian). Lviv–Drohobych: Kolo. 552 pp. ISBN 978-617-642-676-9.
