= Yurii Morachevskyi =

Ukrainian poet, critic (1896–1935)

- Юрій Вацлавович Морачевський
- Born: 4 February 1896; Zurich, Switzerland
- Died: 14 December 1935 (aged 39); Vienna
- Education: University of Lviv
- Occupations: Poet, critic

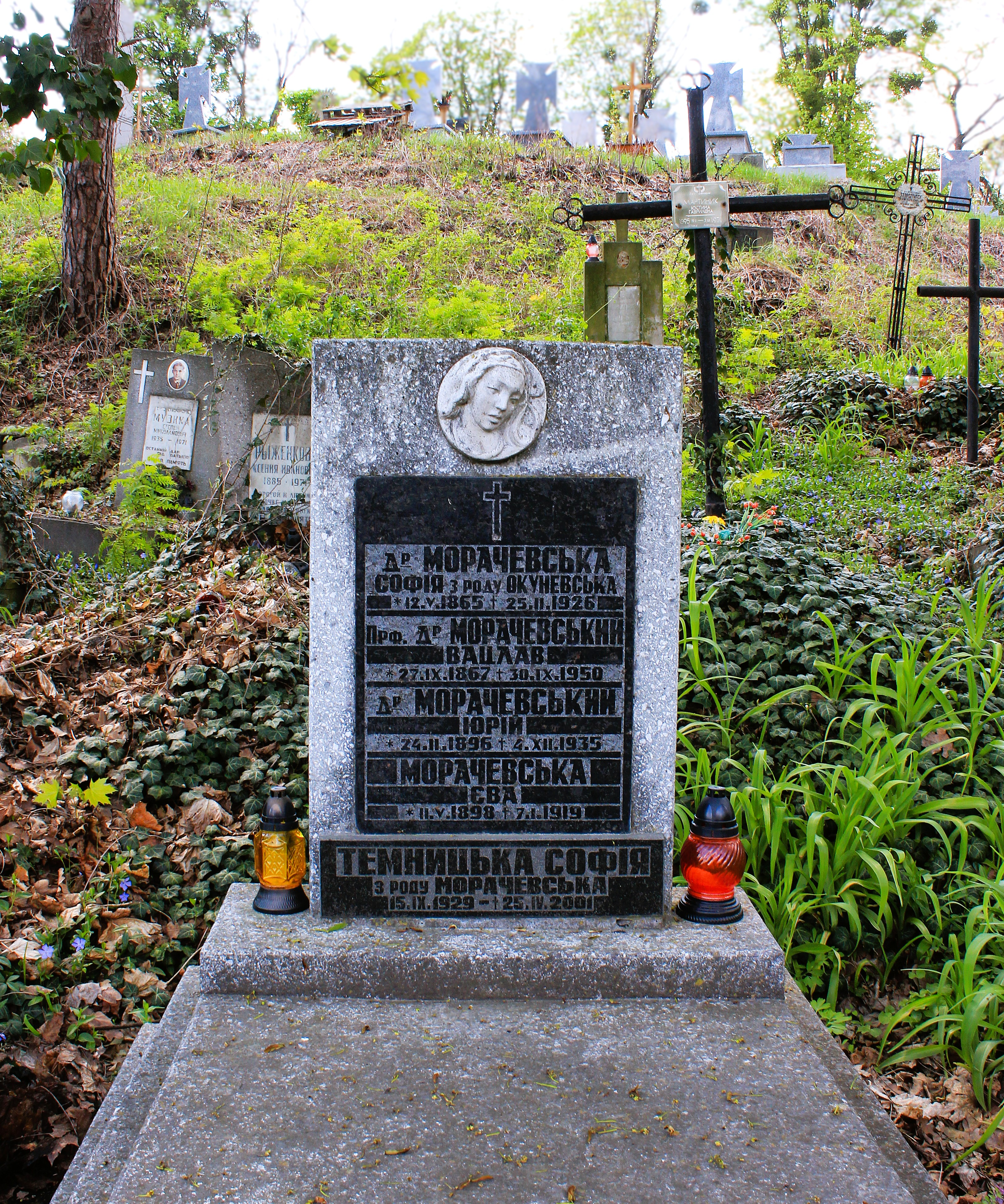
Tombstone on the grave of the Morachevskyi family.

Yurii Morachevskyi (Ukrainian: Юрій Вацлавович Морачевський; 4 February 1896 – 14 December 1935) was a Ukrainian poet, critic. Son of Wacław Damian Moraczewski and Sofia Okunevska, husband of Mariia Krompets-Morachevska, father of Sofiia Morachevska-Temnytska.

== Biography ==
Yurii Morachevskyi was born on 4 February 1896 in Zurich.

A free listener at the University of Zurich, he mastered 10 languages. In 1923 he graduated from University of Lviv. With a law degree, Morachevskyi worked as a judge in Lviv and was a member of the district court.

He had a doctorate in classical philology. In the 1920s and 1930s, Morachevskyi was an original and colorful personality in Ukrainian Lviv. By nationality, he considered himself a Ukrainian, despite the fact that he belonged to the Roman Catholic rite: once Metropolitan Andrei Sheptytskyi asked Morachevsky why he decided to be a Ukrainian, and he replied: "If the Poles were in the same position as the Ukrainians, I would have become a Polish".

He died on 14 December 1935 in Vienna. He was buried on field 36 of the Lychakiv Cemetery in Lviv.

== Works ==
He is the author of several publications on the history of Czech law.

He wrote some works for Vasyl Stefanyk and had friendly relations with his family. In particular, in 1928, he published a review of Stefanyk's collection "Tvory" for the latter, and in 1931, the Zagreb newspaper Morgenblatt published an article "Vasyl Stefanyk: do 60-richchia z dnia narodzhennia ukrainskoho poeta" together with Morachevskyi's German translation of Vasyl Stefanyk's short story "Vona – zemlia". In 1932, in his literary-critical study "Skarb nashoi movy" Morachevskyi reveals the uniqueness of Vasyl Stefanyk's talent as a novelist (the last two works were published in the book "Vasyl Stefanyk u krytytsi ta spohadakh", published in 1970). It is also known that Morachevskyi had art criticism publications, in particular about Oleksa Novakivskyi, about the "unusually beautiful" stained-glass windows of Petro Kholodnyi, and others.

In 1935, he published the lyrical collection "Parerha", which included poems written in Ukrainian, German, French, and Italian. A prominent place in Morachevskyi's oeuvre is occupied by his epistolary work, which can be traced in his correspondence with Vasyl Stefanyk, Olha Kobylianska, and others. Vasyl Stefanyk called Morachevskyi "the highest figure among Ukrainian patriots" and wrote in his honor the novels "Mamyn synok", "Sanchata", and "Pro khlopchyka, shcho yoho vesna vbyla". In 1983, Yurii Klynovych (Yurii Stefanyk) published a book about Morachevskyi, "Yurii Morachevskyi, yoho batky, yoho pryiatel".

== Bibliography ==
- Морачевський Юрій Вацлавович // Українська літературна енциклопедія : у 3 т. / відп. ред. І. О. Дзеверін. — К. : Головна редакція УРЕ, 1995. — Т. 3 : К—Н. — 496 с. — ISBN 5-88500-023-9.
