= Emiliia Okhrymovych-Holubovska =

Ukrainian artist (1903–1994)

- Емілія Степанівна Охримович-Голубовська
- Born: Emiliia Stepanivna Okhrymovych-Holubovska; 30 May 1903; Lviv, Austria-Hungary (now Ukraine)
- Died: 3 October 1994 (aged 91); Karlovy Vary, Czech Republic
- Education: Oleksa Novakivskyi Art School

Emiliia Stepanivna Okhrymovych-Holubovska (Ukrainian: Емілія Степанівна Охримович-Голубовська; 30 May 1903 – 3 October 1994) was a Ukrainian artist of decorative and applied arts.

== Biography ==
Studied at the Oleksa Novakivskyi Art School. She lived in the artist's apartment with her husband, and after O. Novakivskyi's wife died, she was a tutor for his two sons.

She worked as an artist at the National Museum in Lviv (1927–1928). For 14 years, she collaborated anonymously with the editorial board of the women's magazine "Nova Khata" (from 1925), for which she created fashionable designs of clothing and embroidered items (hoops, napkins, pillows, etc.) in the Ukrainian national style. In her works, she creatively embodied the motifs of Ukrainian folk ornamentation.

From the 1940s she lived in Germany; in 1945 she lived in Vejprty (Czechoslovakia). She kept part of her father's archive and the archive of Stanislav Dnistrianskyi.

Died on 3 October 1994 in Karlovy Vary (Czech Republic). In 2001 she was reburied in Lviv.

Daughter of Stepan Rudnytskyi, wife of Ivan Okhrymovych.

== Bibliography ==
- L. Voloshyn (2024). "Охримович-Голубовська Емілія". Мистецька школа Олекси Новаківського 1923-1935. Життя у перспективі часу (in Ukrainian). Lviv–Drohobych: Kolo. p. 407—408. ISBN 978-617-642-676-9.
