= Stara Skvariava =

Rural locality in Lviv Oblast, Ukraine

Stara Skvariava Стара Скварява
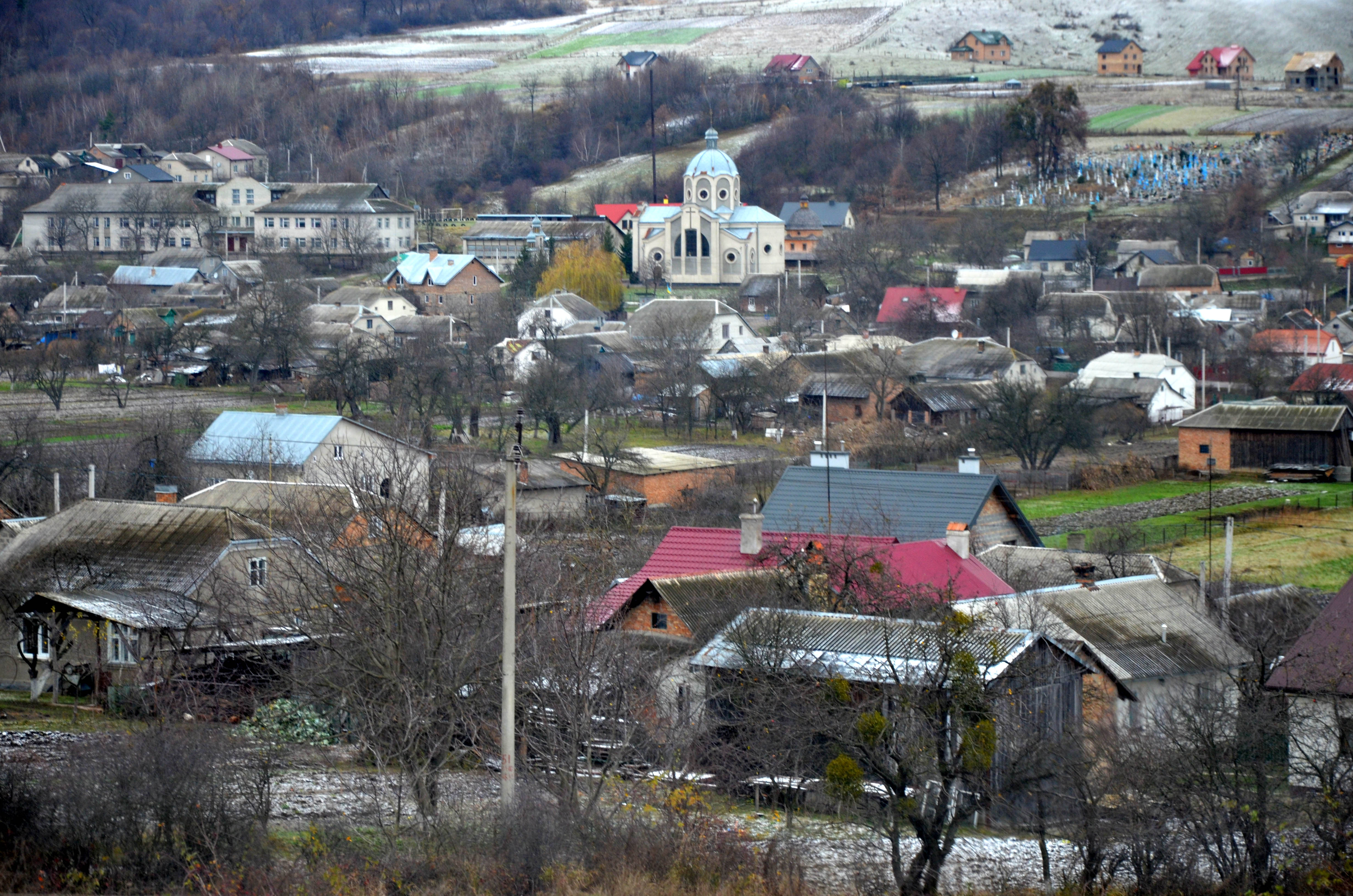

- Location in Lviv Oblast Stara Skvariava (Ukraine)
- Coordinates: 50°2′19″N 23°56′41″E
- Country: Ukraine
- Oblast: Lviv Oblast
- Raion: Lviv Raion
- Hromada: Zhovkva urban hromada
- Time zone: UTC+2 (EET)
  - Summer (DST): UTC+3 (EEST)
- Postal code: 80354

Stara Skvariava (Ukrainian: Стара Скварява, Polish: Stara Skwarzawa) is a village in the Zhovkva urban hromada of the Lviv Raion of Lviv Oblast in Ukraine.

== History ==
The first written mention of the village was in 1368.

A small brick manor built in 1807 by Józef Bołoz Antoniewicz. The building was surrounded by a park.

In the Second Polish Republic, until 1934, it was an independent rural municipality. Subsequently, it became part of the collective rural Mokrotyn municipality in the Żółkiew County of the Lwów Voivodeship.

In April and May 1944, Ukrainian nationalists from the OUN-UPA murdered 63 Poles here, looting and burning Polish households, part of Volhynia genocide.

After the war, the village became part of the administrative structures of the Soviet Union.

On 19 July 2020, as a result of the administrative-territorial reform and liquidation of the Zhovkva Raion, the village became part of the Lviv Raion.

== Religion ==
The village has a wooden church of Saint Michael built in 1508 with a unique iconostasis dating back to the 16th-18th centuries. In the 1990s, a brick church was built near the shrine.

== Bibliography ==
- "Skwarzawa (3)". Geographical Dictionary of the Kingdom of Poland (in Polish). 10. Warszawa: Kasa im. Józefa Mianowskiego. 1889. p. 742.
