= Sokolivka, Zolochiv Raion, Lviv Oblast =

Rural locality in Lviv Oblast, Ukraine

Sokolivka Соколівка
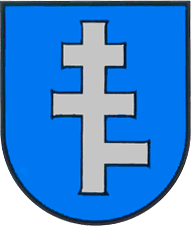
- Coat of arms

- Location in Lviv Oblast Sokolivka (Ukraine)
- Coordinates: 50°2′24″N 24°51′0″E
- Country: Ukraine
- Oblast: Lviv Oblast
- Raion: Zolochiv Raion
- Hromada: Busk urban hromada
- Time zone: UTC+2 (EET)
  - Summer (DST): UTC+3 (EEST)
- Postal code: 80525

Sokolivka (Ukrainian: Соколівка) is a village in the Busk urban hromada of the Zolochiv Raion of Lviv Oblast in Ukraine.

== History ==
The first written mention of the village was in 1016.

On 19 July 2020, as a result of the administrative-territorial reform and liquidation of the Busk Raion, the village became part of the Zolochiv Raion.

== Notable residents ==
- Mariia Krompets-Morachevska (1897–1960), Ukrainian artist of decorative and applied arts, a painter, and a teacher

== Sources ==
- "Sokołówka (2)". Geographical Dictionary of the Kingdom of Poland (in Polish). 11. Warszawa: Kasa im. Józefa Mianowskiego. 1890. p. 35.
