= Mariia Karpiuk =

Ukrainian painter (1900–1978)

- Марія Василівна Карп'юк
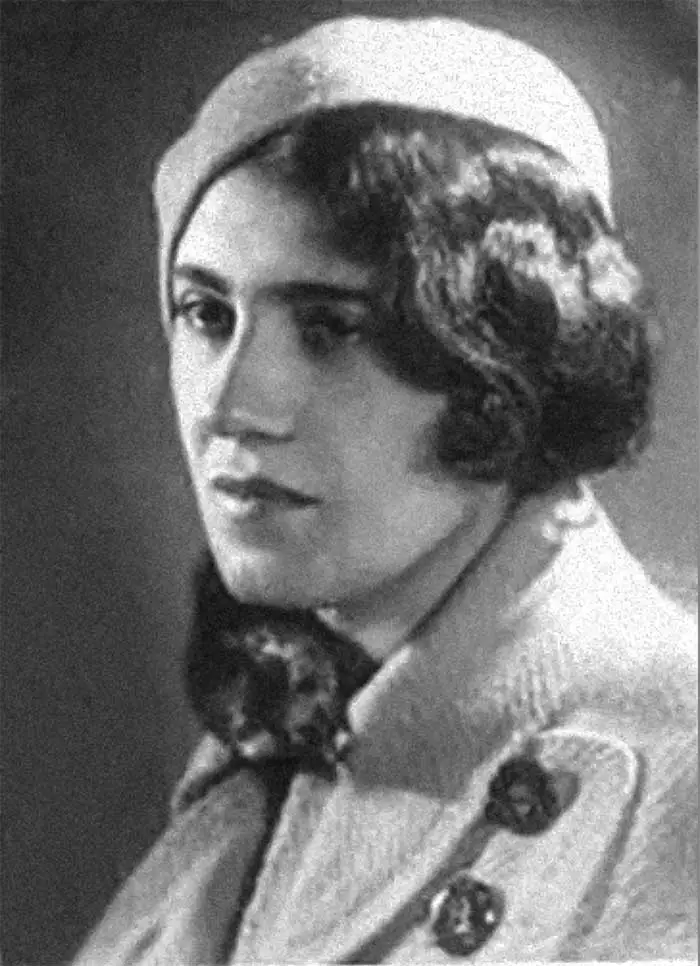
- Born: 14 June 1900; Sniatyn, Austria-Hungary (now Ukraine)
- Died: 3 June 1978 (aged 77); Kyiv
- Education: Oleksa Novakivskyi Art School
- Occupation: Painter

Mariia Karpiuk (Ukrainian: Марія Василівна Карп'юк; 14 June 1900 – 3 June 1978) was a Ukrainian painter, and the wife of Osip Sorokhtei.

== Biography ==
Mariia Karpiuk was born on 14 June 1900 in the town of Sniatyn.

In 1928, she graduated from the Oleksa Novakivskyi Art School in Lviv. In the same year, she participated in the exhibition of the mentioned educational institution in Lviv.

In 1929, she took an internship at the Louvre (Paris), which was funded by Metropolitan Andrei Sheptytskyi (for him, Karpiuk made a copy of the painting "Portrait of a Man", which belongs to the 15th-century Florentine School).

Karpiuk painted realistic portraits, landscapes, and still lifes in which impressionism and post-impressionism can be traced. Some of her works are kept in the collections of the Lviv Art Gallery and the Marko Cheremshyna Literary and Memorial Museum in Sniatyn.

Among the main works: graphics – "O. Sorokhtei" (1928); paintings – "Landscape of Stanyslaviv" (1930s), "Grandmother", "Moonlight Night" (both 1930), "Daughter" (1950s), "Grandson Andrii" (1960s).

She died on 3 June 1978 in Kyiv. She was buried at the Lisovyi Cemetery.

== Honoring the memory ==
In February 2022, on the occasion of the 120th anniversary of Mariia Karpiuk's birth, a special redemption of the stamp dedicated to the artist took place. In the same year, the Museum of Ethnography and Crafts opened a solo exhibition "Natkhnenni odniieiu muzeiu", which included works by Mariia Karpiuk and Osyp Sorokhtei. Later, the exhibition of the same name was presented in Sniatyn, Ivano-Frankivsk, and Drohobych.
