= Ivanna Nyzhnyk-Vynnykiv =

Ukrainian artist (1912–1993)

- Іванна Василівна Нижник-Винників
- Born: 8 July 1912; Lviv, Austria-Hungary (now Ukraine)
- Died: 9 January 1993 (aged 80); Cannes, France
- Education: Oleksa Novakivskyi Art School, Académie Julian
- Occupations: Artist of decorative textiles and ceramics, painter

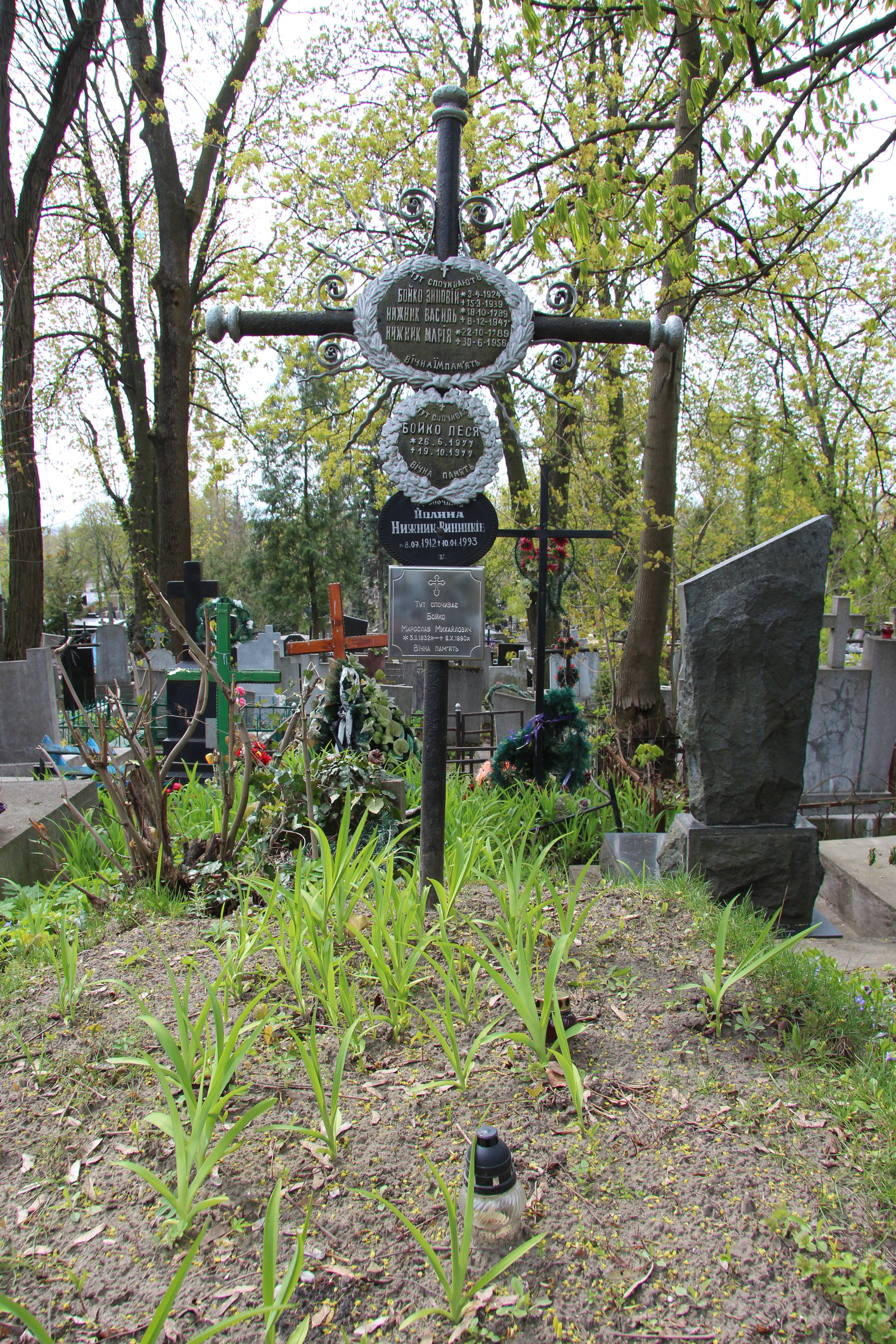
Grave of Ivanna Nyzhnyk-Vynnykiv

Ivanna Nyzhnyk-Vynnykiv (Ukrainian: Іванна Василівна Нижник-Винників; 8 July 1912 – 9 January 1993) was a Ukrainian artist of decorative textiles and ceramics as well as a painter. From 1938 she was a member of the Association of Independent Ukrainian Artists.

== Biography ==
Ivanna Nyzhnyk was born on 8 July 1912 in Lviv to the family of Vasyl Nyzhnyk and Mariia née Roiterovska (Ройтеровська).

Until 1935, she studied at the Oleksa Novakivskyi Art School in Lviv. In 1949, she also finished studying painting at the Académie Julian. In 1932, she became an activist of the youth creative group "Rub", and in 1933, she became a member of the editorial board of the art almanac "Karby".

From 1942 in Poland, and during 1945–1946 in the camps for displaced persons in the American occupation zone in Germany. In 1947–1957 she worked in Paris.

She was also active in the public life of the Ukrainian community. In particular, she was a member of the Ukrainian Women's Union in France and the World Federation of Ukrainian Women's Organizations. As a compiler of ethnographic materials, she established cooperation with the scientific center of the Shevchenko Scientific Society in Sarcelles.

Nyzhnyk-Vynnykiv lived in the former home of Volodymyr Vynnychenko in Mougins, France. She died on 9 January 1993. In September 1995, she was reburied at the Yaniv Cemetery in Lviv.

== Creativity ==
At the beginning of her career, she mostly painted portraits, still lifes, and mountain landscapes of Kosmach, Pidliute, Yamna, the outskirts of Lviv, Zboriv, and Snovydiv in an expressionist style similar to her teacher Oleksa Novakivskyi.

She worked in various techniques of graphics, tapestry, batik (decorative panels) and silk embroidery with gold and silver threads (khorugv and flags). Some of the works are kept in the National Museum of Lviv, and National Art Museum of Ukraine.

In 1932, she began to present her works at exhibitions, in particular in 1970, together with Pablo Picasso, with whom she collaborated (in 1985, she dedicated the painting "In Honor of Picasso" to the artist), she participated in an exhibition of with ceramic works in Mougins. Personal exhibitions took place in 1948, 1949, 1988, 1992 in Paris; in 2002, 2012, anniversary exhibitions in Lviv, in 2012, anniversary in Kyiv.

== Bibliography ==
- L. Voloshyn (2024). "Нижник-Винників Іванна". Мистецька школа Олекси Новаківського 1923-1935. Життя у перспективі часу (in Ukrainian). Lviv–Drohobych: Kolo. p. 278—285, 402—405. ISBN 978-617-642-676-9.
- Іванна Нижник-Винників. Рання творчість у Львові, 1920—1930 роки / Л. Волошин ; Нац. музей у Львові ім. А. Шептицького, Худож.-мемор. музей О. Новаківського. — Л. : Афіша, 2013. — 132 с. : іл. — Бібліогр.: с. 121—122 (16 назв). — ISBN 978-966-325-188-2
- Іванна Нижник-Винників. Творчість на еміграції. Німеччина, Франція. 1945—1993 роки: [монографія] / Л. Волошин ; Нац. музей у Львові ім. А. Шептицького. — Львів: Афіша, 2015. — 372 с. : іл., портр. — Бібліогр.: с. 216 (16 назв). — ISBN 978-966-325-208-7
- Федорук О. К. Повернення шедеврів: [Про виставку мист. творів Іванни Нижник-Винників та Юрія Кульчицького] // КіЖ. 1995, 4 трав.
