= Church of Virgin Mary, Ivano-Frankivsk =

Church in Ivano-Frankivsk, Ukraine

Collegiate Church of Virgin Mary
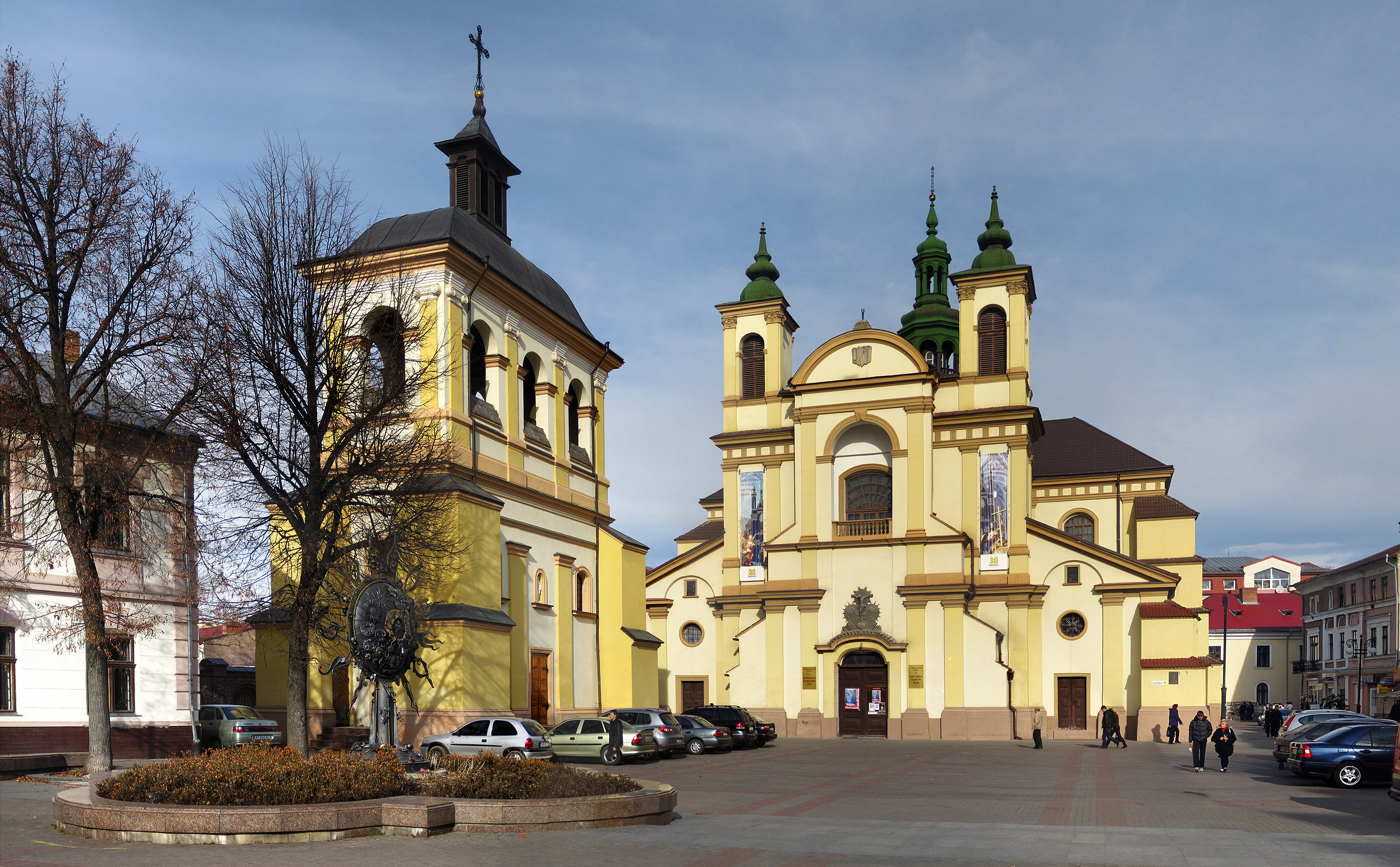
- Interactive map of the Collegiate Church of Virgin Mary area
- Alternative names: Fara

General information
- Type: Cult structure
- Architectural style: Baroque
- Location: 8 Sheptytsky Square, Ivano-Frankivsk, Ukraine
- Coordinates: 48.923727°N 24.70919°E
- Current tenants: Regional Art Museum
- Construction started: ~1660s
- Inaugurated: 1662; 1774 (bell assembly)
- Renovated: 1980; 2000 (bell assembly)
- Owner: City government

Design and construction
- Other designers: Karol Benoe (1672)

Immovable Monument of National Significance of Ukraine
- Official name: Костьол (Church)
- Type: Architecture
- Reference no.: 090039

Church of Virgin Mary is a collegiate parish church and the oldest building of Ivano-Frankivsk city. The church building ensemble includes the main building and a belfry that was rebuilt after the fall of Soviet Union.

== History ==
The exact date of the church's founding is not known. It is known that when the fortress of Stanislawow was erected together with it, Andrzej Potocki started to build out wood the Catholic parish church as well. The pastor and chaplain Wojcech Bialachewski helped him as the old friend. The newly erected church was named after the Virgin Mary, Saint Andrew, Saint Stanislaus, and Saint Anna. On June 14, 1669 Andrzej Potocki was able to acquire the status of collegiate for the church. It was consecrated by Archbishop Jan Tarnowski. Here was opened a campus of the Jagiellonian University (Kraków).

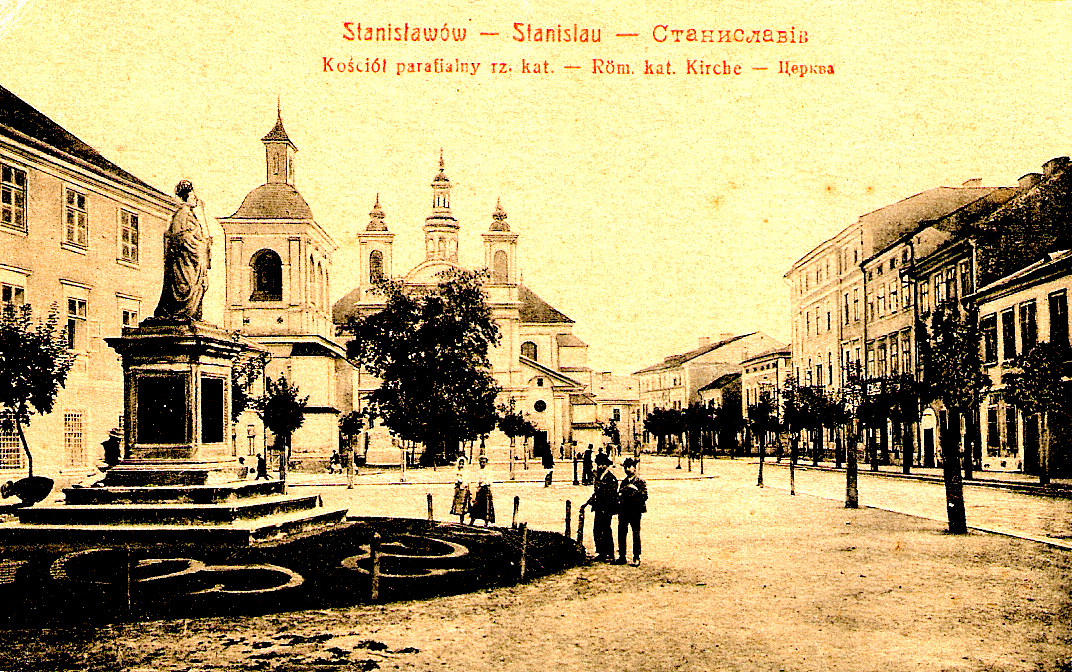
Postcard of 1900 with the Church of Virgin Mary in the background

Soon after that sometime in the 1670s Andrzej Potocki financed redesign of the wooden church into limestone by designs of Francua Korassini and Karlo Benoe. In 1703 the redesigned temple was reconsecrated by Archbishop Konstanty Zelinski. In 1737 Jozef Potocki continued to improve the church. The bell assembly next to the former building of a church was erected in 1774. During 1782-1799 the status of the church was lowered by the Austrian authorities to a parish church. In the second half of the 19th century the building required some renovations and the current church pastor Father Joan Krasowski hired Erazm-Rudolf Fabianski to conduct the restoration works. All that was destroyed during the fire in 1882 and was again restored only ten years later in 1892. Since that time in the church was established a music school as well.

With establishment of the Soviet power in the region the church as most other religious buildings went into decline. The anticipated promotion of the church to cathedral in December 1939 failed and soon most of the Latin Rite Catholics who mostly were the Polish nationals left the city with the end of World War II. In 1962 the temple was closed down and the next year the bell assembly was destroyed. In 1965 the building was passed in possession to the Institute of Oil and Gaz as a geological museum. On May 18, 1980 after a substantial restoration works in the building was opened an exposition of the Regional Art Museum.

Currently the building is the only church structure in the city that is used for other than religious purposes.
