= Vasyl Diadyniuk =

Ukrainian painter, monumentalist and graphic artist (1900–1944)

- Василь Андрійович Дядинюк
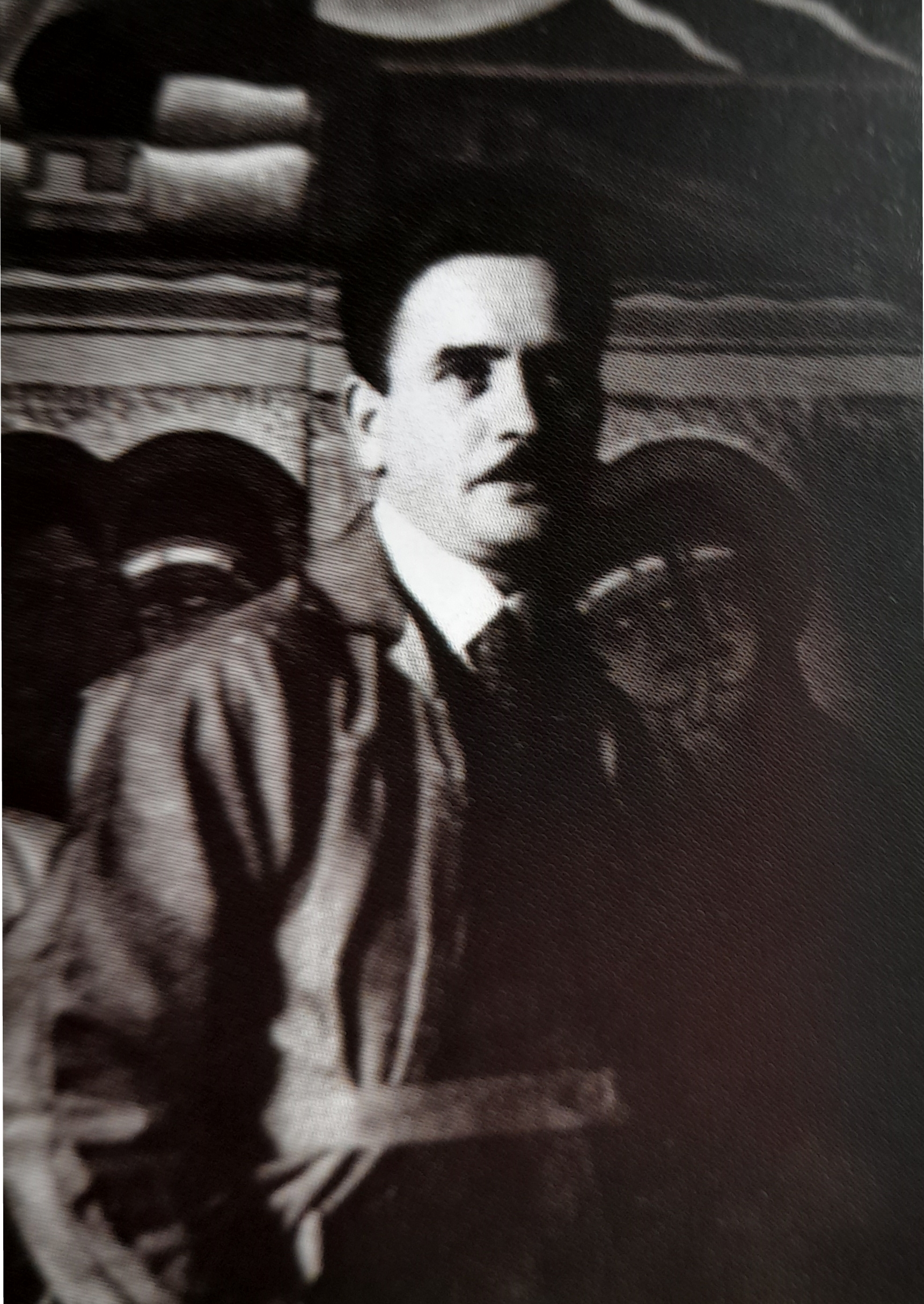
- Born: 1 January 1900; Luchynets, now Vinnytsia Oblast, Ukraine
- Died: 21 January 1944 (aged 44); Vienna
- Education: Oleksa Novakivskyi Art School, Paris National High School of Arts, Académie Julian
- Occupations: Painter, monumentalist and graphic artist

Vasyl Diadyniuk (Ukrainian: Василь Андрійович Дядинюк; 1 January 1900 – 21 January 1944) was a Ukrainian painter, monumentalist and graphic artist. He was married to Olha Kozakevych-Diadyniuk.

== Biography ==
Vasyl Diadyniuk was born on 1 January 1900 in Luchynets, now Vinnytsia Oblast.

He participated in the battles for Ukrainian independence as a member of the Ukrainian People's Army. Later, he was taken to the internment camp for Ukrainian soldiers in Kalisz, Poland. In 1924 he was released. From then on, he lived in Lviv, where he studied at the Oleksa Novakivskyi Art School until 1928, as well as with Petro Kholodnyi.

During 1927-1930, on behalf of Metropolitan Andrei Sheptytskyi, he made studio trips to Vilno (he made twelve copies of portraits of Uniate bishops), Rome, Florence, and Venice (in all three he copied paintings by Fra Angelico, Leonardo da Vinci, Sandro Botticelli, and Peter Paul Rubens and Rembrandt).

Until 1929, at the expense of Andrei Sheptytskyi, he studied in France, and later studied at the Paris National High School of Arts and the Académie Julian. His works were exhibited at the Grand Palais.

In 1930–1933, he headed the schools of religious art that operated at the monastery of the Studite Fathers in Lviv.

He died on 21 January 1944 in Vienna.

== Works ==
He painted churches, created book and industrial graphics, and worked in the collage technique. In his works, he applied the Ukrainian-Byzantine style and used constructivism in his graphics.

In 1926, he began to participate in exhibitions held in Lviv, Krakow, Vienna, Paris, Prague, Philadelphia, and New York. In the same year, he held a solo exhibition in Kolomyia.

Among his main works:

- portrait series "Rulers of Ukraine";
- "Nesennia khresta", "Rozpiattia" (both from the 1920s.), "Natiurmort iz ryboiu" (1932), "Myronosytsi" (1933);
- portraits – "Lehin z Kryvorivni" (c. 1930s.), "A. Hankivskyi", "O. Hankivska" (both are from the 1940s.);

book covers of the series "Riast" (1930s.).

== Awards ==
- 1938 – 2nd prize for the best painting at the competition in the museum of the Shevchenko Scientific Society.

== Honoring the memory ==
In 1990, a street in Kolomyia was named after Diadyniuk.
