= Ostapivka, Myrhorod Raion, Poltava Oblast =

Rural locality in Poltava Oblast, Ukraine

Ostapivka Остапівка
- Location in Poltava Oblast Ostapivka (Ukraine)
- Coordinates: 50°13′53″N 33°40′19″E
- Country: Ukraine
- Oblast: Poltava Oblast
- Raion: Myrhorod Raion
- Hromada: Komyshnia settlement hromada
- Time zone: UTC+2 (EET)
  - Summer (DST): UTC+3 (EEST)
- Postal code: 37610

Ostapivka (Ukrainian: Остапівка) is a village in the Komyshnia settlement hromada of the Myrhorod Raion of Poltava Oblast in Ukraine.

== History ==
The village was part of the Hadiach Regiment during the second half of the 17th century.

On 19 July 2020, as a result of the administrative-territorial reform and liquidation of the Myrhorod Raion, the village became part of the Myrhorod Raion.

== Religion ==
- Church of the Dormition (1874, wooden)

== Notable residents ==
- Ivan Severyn (1881–1964), Ukrainian painter

== Bibliography ==
- Історія Остапівки. Нарис-опис 2014
