= Sheptytsky Square =

Square in Ivano-Frankivsk, Ukraine

Coordinates: 48°55′23″N 24°42′32″E

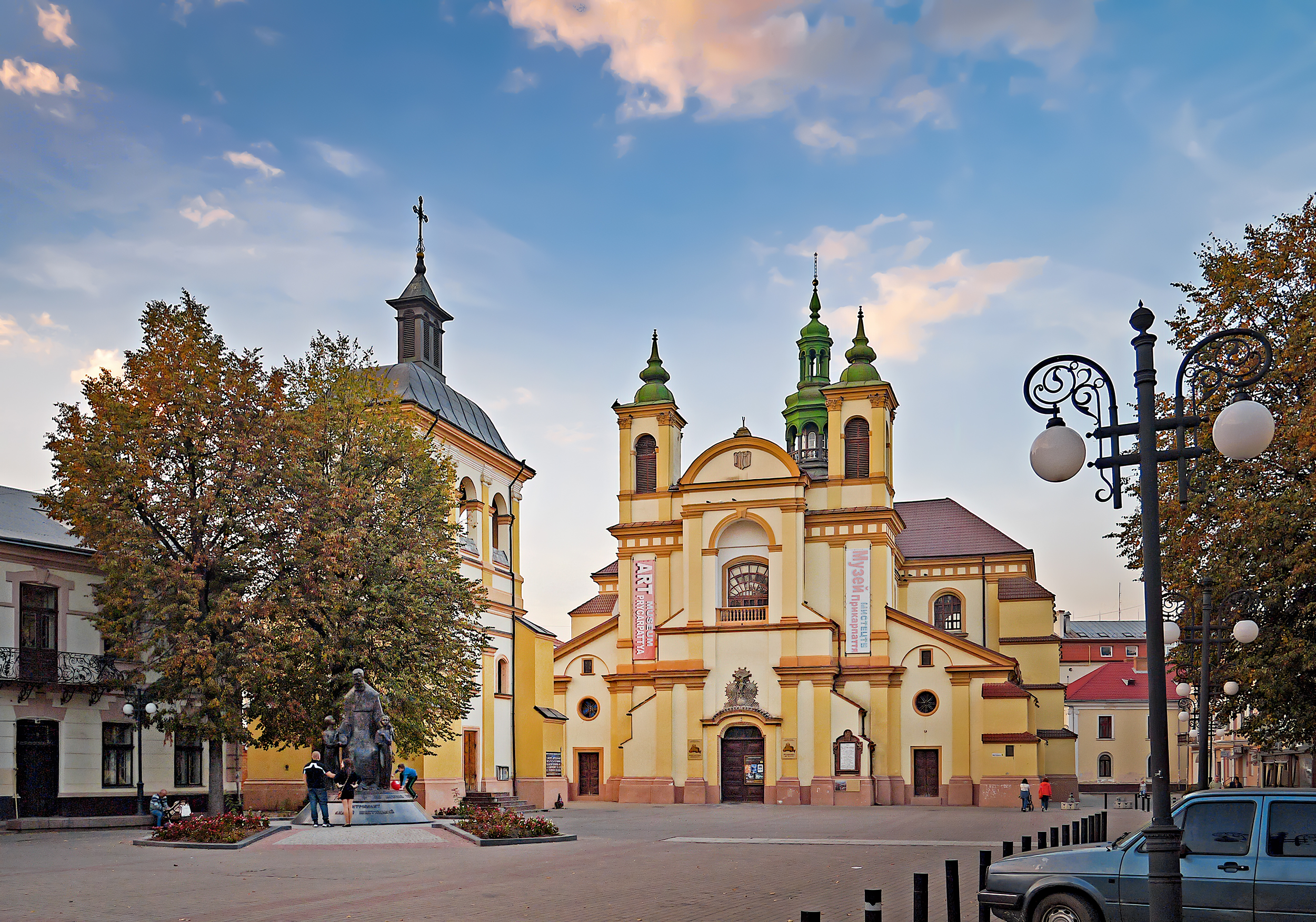
Collegiate church

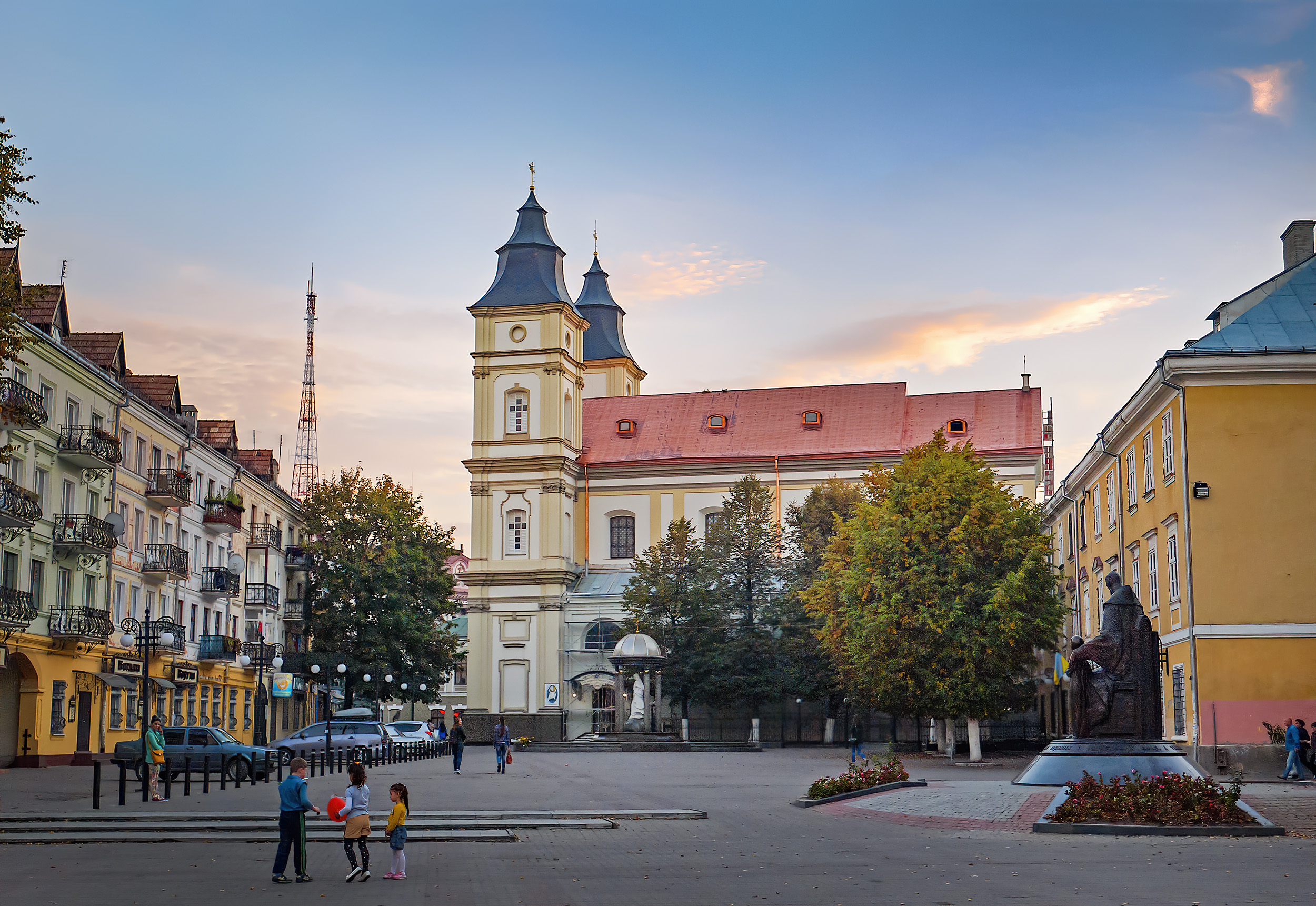
Cathedral of Holy Resurrection

Sheptytsky Square (Ukrainian: Майдан Шептицького, romanized: Maidan Sheptytskoho) is a square in the old town of Ivano-Frankivsk, commemorated to the head of Ukrainian Greek Catholic Church, Metropolitan Archbishop Lviv Andrey Sheptytsky who initially served in the town as bishop.

The square is located in the center of the town, directly adjacent to the Market Square separated from it by a row of private multi-story apartment buildings. The northern end of the square faces the Roman Catholic collegiate church of the Blessed Virgin Mary building which at the moment contains an art museum. The southern end faces the Greek Catholic Cathedral of Holy Resurrection located in a former Jesuit church and the western side of the square contains the building of a former Jesuit college now used the Ivano-Frankivsk Medical University.
