= Mykhailo Dragan =

Ukrainian art historian (1899–1952)

- Михайло Дмитрович Драґан
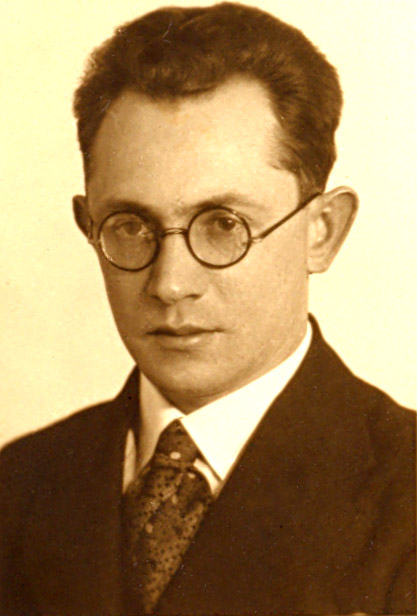
- Born: 21 November 1899; Tustanovychi, Austria-Hungary (now Ukraine)
- Died: 8 March 1952 (aged 52); Lviv
- Education: Oleksa Novakivskyi Art School, Secret Ukrainian University, Kraków Academy of Arts, University of Lviv
- Occupation: Art historian

Mykhailo Dragan (Ukrainian: Михайло Дмитрович Драґан; 21 November 1899 – 8 March 1952) was a Ukrainian art historian. In 1952, he received a Doctor of Art history degree, and in 1944–1948 he was a member of the Union of Artists of Ukraine.

== Biography ==
Mykhailo Dragan was born on 21 November 1899 in Tustanovychi, now part of Boryslav, Lviv Oblast.

He graduated from several educational institutions, including in 1920 – Oleksa Novakivskyi Art School, 1924 – Secret Ukrainian University, 1925 – Kraków Academy of Arts (teachers Penkowski and W. Jarocki), 1931 – University of Lviv.

In 1924, he started working at the National Museum of Lviv, where in 1939–1950 he was deputy director and head of the Department of Ancient Art, but was later dismissed for his active work in the Association of Independent Ukrainian Artists; he also served as the head of the Museum of the Lviv Theological Academy in 1932–1939; in 1945–1947 he was a senior researcher at the Museum of Ethnography and Art Crafts.

He died on 8 March 1952 in Lviv.

== Works ==
His research interests included church architecture and sacred art of Galicia and Boikivshchyna. Dragan was also the first to systematically describe and draw types of Boykos architecture, including 2,500 drawings. He contributed to the magazines "Dilo" and "Nova Zoria" on the topics of artistic life in Lviv.

He was also in charge of restoration and conservation, including the Piatnitskyi and Bohorodchany iconostases, and left the project for the reconstruction of the latter in the drawing.

Among the main monographs:

- Скит Манявський і Богородчанський іконостас (1926, co-author)
- catalog of the posthumous exhibition of Petro Kholodnyi (1931)
- Сучасний український екслібрис: Збірник Асоціації незалежних українських мистців (1932)
- Українські дерев'яні церкви: Генеза і розвій форм. Volumes. 1–2 (1937)
- Живопис Західної України (1945)
- Українська декоративна різьба XVII–XVIII ст. (1970, prepared for publication by Vira Svientsitska)

== Honoring the memory ==
In the 1990s, Drohobych hosted the annual "Dragan readings".
