= Ivano-Frankivsk Regional Art Museum =

Art museum in Ivano-Frankivsk

Art Museum of Prykarpattia
- Музей мистецтв Прикарпаття
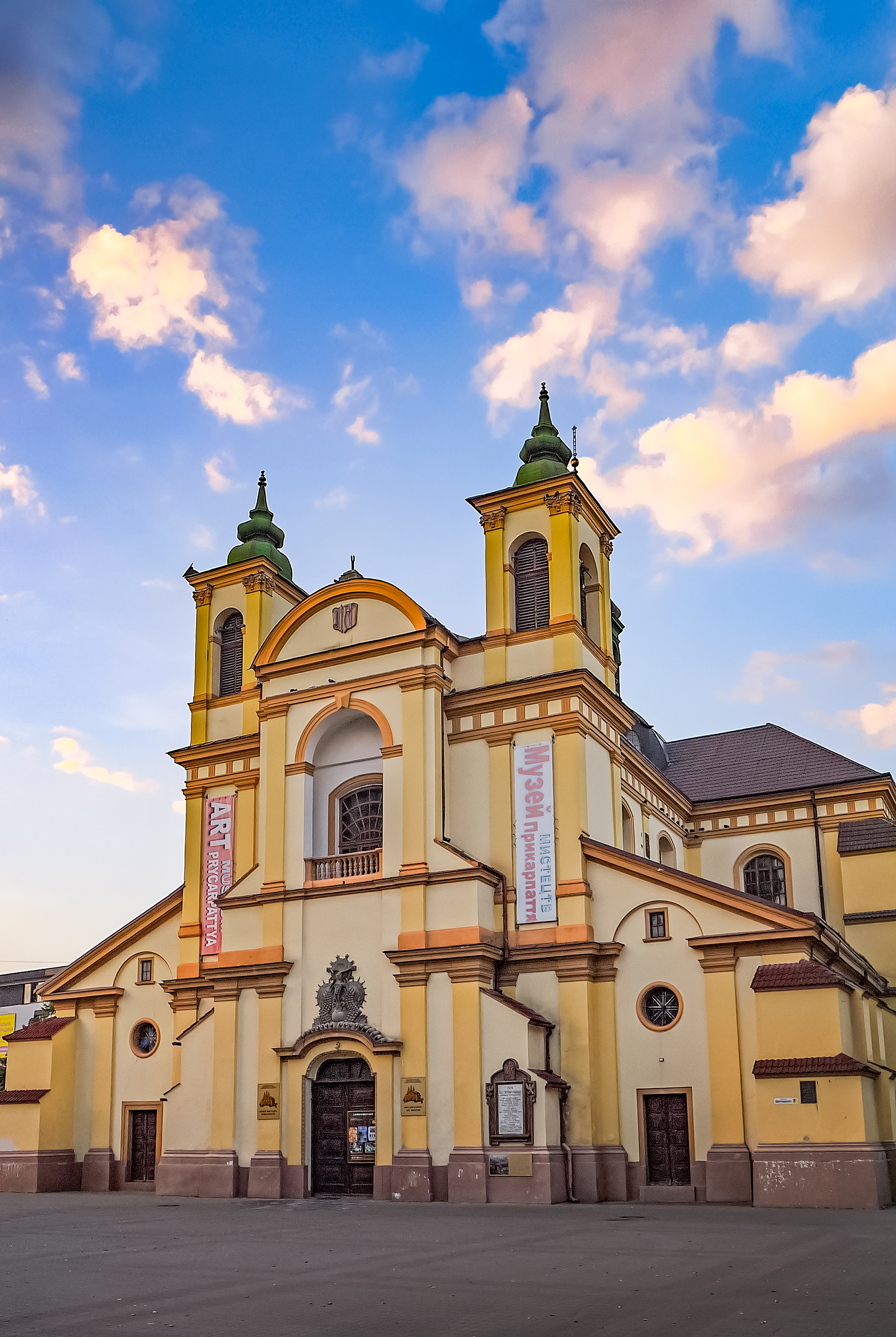
- Art Museum of Prykarpattia

- Location within Ukraine
- Former name: Ivano-Frankivsk Regional Art Museum
- Established: 1980; 46 years ago
- Location: Maydan Sheptytskoho, 8, Ivano-Frankivsk, Ivano-Frankivsk Oblast, Ukraine
- Coordinates: 48°55′25″N 24°42′33″E
- Collections: Sacred Art of Galicia
- Collection size: 12,000
- Director: Vasyl Romanets
- Website: https://artmuseum.org.ua/?sa=X&ved=2ahUKEwjv5fqRgPb_AhWUTKsCHZo2CUUQyK4DegQIAxAq

The Art Museum of Prykarpattia (Ukrainian: Музей мистецтв Прикрапаття), originally the Ivano-Frankivsk Regional Art Museum (until 2012) is a regional art museum located at 8 Maidan Andrey Sheptytskyi, Ivano-Frankivsk, Ukraine, in the former Church of Virgin Mary. It has one of the best collections of local religious art, and specializes in displaying works by local artists.

== History ==
=== Ivano-Frankivsk Regional Art Museum (1980-1989) ===
The Ivano-Frankivsk Regional Art Museum was opened in 1980 in the premises of a former religious building – the Baroque Collegiate Church of the Immaculate Conception of the Virgin Mary of the 17th century (originally used as a Potocki family tomb). The museum was created from the art collection of the Ivano-Frankivsk Museum of Local History (Ivano-Frankivsk Museum of Local History). The inaugural exposition of the museum displayed works of a secular nature from the late 19th – early 20th centuries.

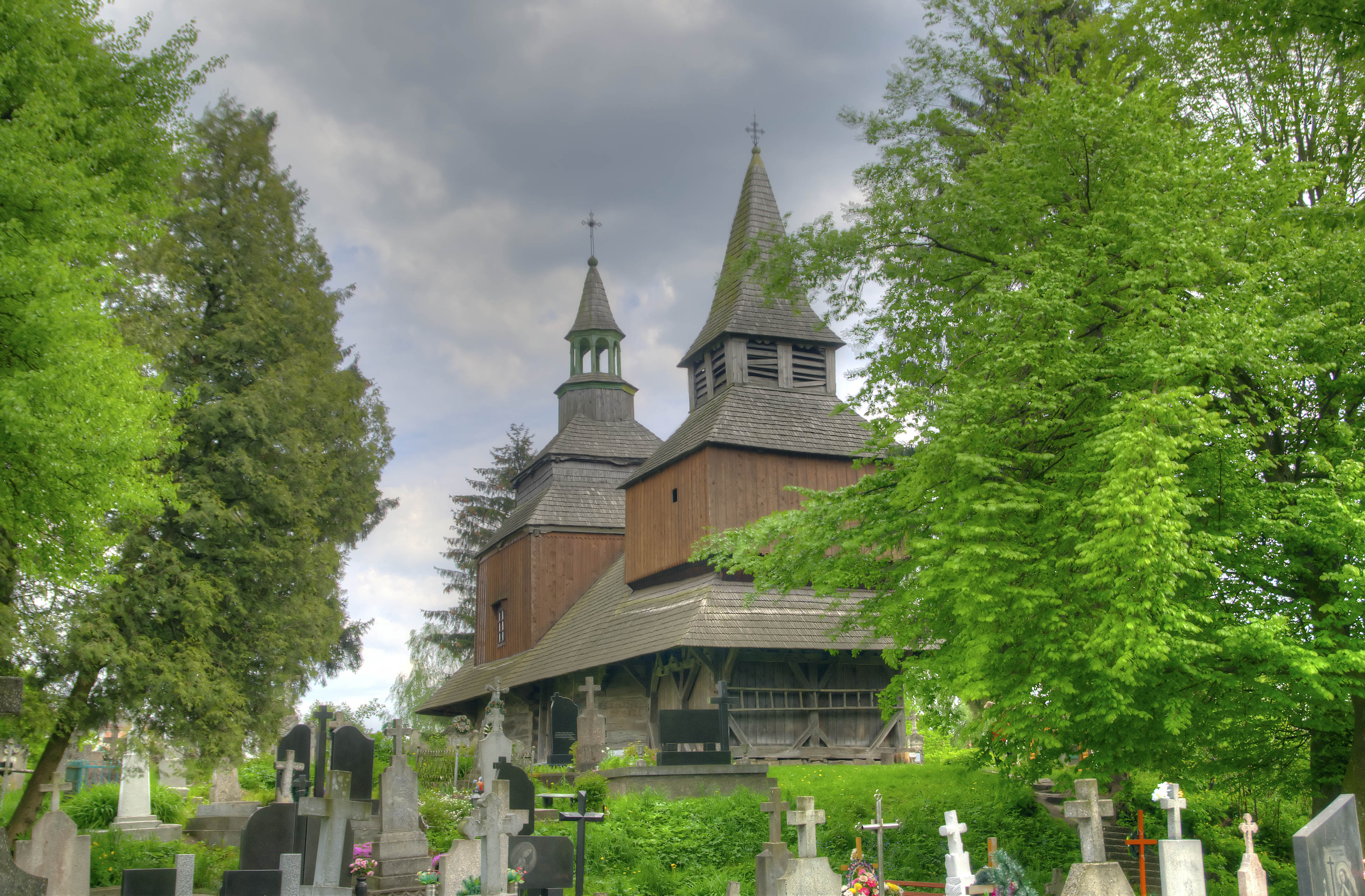
Church of the Holy Spirit (1598) Rohatyn, Ukraine

In the early 1980s, the museum took administrative operation of two satellite branches, in 1982 the Vasily I. Kasiyan Art Memorial Museum in Snyatin, and in 1983 the Museum-Monument of Architecture and Painting of the 16th-17th centuries, operating from the premises of the Church of the Holy Spirit in the city of Rohatyn.

=== Art Museum of Prykarpattia (from 1990) ===
In 1990-93, following Ukraine's transition to independence, the museum's mission was directed to the restoration of museum objects and the regional search for additional objects to augment the collection. In cooperation with restorers from the Lviv branch of the National Scientific and Research Restoration Center of Ukraine, the majority of the works of the exhibition "Sacred Art of Galicia of the 15th – 20th Centuries" (1993) were restored, and the interior frescos of the Church of the Virgin Mary by Erazmus Rudolf Fabijański, (1877) were uncovered and restored. On August 18, 1993, the "Sacred Art of Galicia of the 19th–20th centuries" exhibition opened.

In 2003, cooperation with the restoration workshops of Kyiv and Lviv, the restorers of the Prykarpattia Museum of Art with the support of patrons involved in the actions "Save the painting!" and "Returned from Absence", which were initiated by the museum staff in 2003, restored a total of 183 sacred works.

The collection was augmented via a region-wide search that had been ongoing since 1983, conducted by museum employees, resulting in the addition of 700 pieces of sacred works to the collection.

In 2013, the International Charitable Fund "Ukraine 3000" and the Ukrainian Center for the Development of Museum Affairs awarded Prykarpattia Museum of Art first place in "The Best Museum Event of the Year-2012" for the organization and display of the exhibition "Ioann Georg Pinzel: Baroque sculpture of Ukraine of the 18th century" at the Louvre Museum in Paris (November 22, 2012 – February 25, 2013).

On June 21, 2013, at the 37th session of the UNESCO World Heritage Committee in Cambodia, the branch of the Prykarpattia Art Museum – the Church of the Descent of the Holy Spirit in Rohatyn was unanimously included in the World Heritage List under the nomination "Wooden churches of the Carpathian region in Poland and Ukraine" UNESCO.

== Collection ==
The collection includes some 12,000 museum objects, divided between some 5,000 works of fine art and 7,000 works of decorative and applied art. The most important exhibitions are the "Religious art of Galicia in the 15th-20th centuries" (permanent collection) and baroque sculptures by Johann Georg Pinsel.

The Art Museum of Prykarpattia is a treasury of fine arts of the region. The collection includes unique sights of Galician icon painting and baroque sculpture, works of classics of Western Ukrainian painting: Kornyl Ustinovych, Ivan Trush, Yaroslav Pstrak, Yulian Dankevych, Oleksa Novakivskyi, Osyp Sorohtey, Olena Kulchytska; works of Ukrainian artists of the second half of the 20th century, as well as works of Polish, Austrian, German and Italian masters of the 18th-20th centuries. The museum houses a large collection of modern foreign graphics donated from the exhibitions of the International Biennale "Impreza". Folk creativity is represented by various types of decorative and applied art of Hutsul region, Boykiv region, Pokuttya, Opillya. The current exhibition hall is located in the oldest architectural building of the city – the Renaissance Collegiate church of the 17th century on the square of Metropolitan Andrey Sheptytskyi. The richest part of the museum collection is on display: icon painting of the region of the 15th-19th centuries; works of baroque plastic by Thomas Gudder, Konrad Kutchenreiter, Ioan-Georgi Pinzel, Matvii Poleiovskyi, Dionez Stanetti; paintings by the Unterberg brothers; ancient church books were published in Lviv, Pochayev, and Univ.

The activities of the only museum of artistic profile in the region are aimed at professional study and popularization of the works of artists of Prykarpattia, search for works of ancient art and their scientific processing and preservation.

Every month, changing exhibitions are held in the exhibition hall, and concerts of classical music and choral singing are heard in its permanent exposition.
