= Zhovkva urban hromada =

Hromada in Lviv Oblast, Ukraine

Zhovkva urban hromada Жовківська міська громада
- Hromada
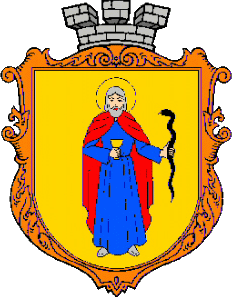
- Seal
- Interactive map of Zhovkva urban hromada
- Country: Ukraine
- Oblast: Lviv Oblast
- Raion: Lviv Raion
- Admin. center: Zhovkva

Area
  - Total: 4,536 km^{2} (1,751 sq mi)

Population (2021)
  - Total: 34,560
  - Density: 7.619/km^{2} (19.73/sq mi)
- CATOTTG code: UA46060130000059055
- Settlements: 49
- Cities: 1
- Villages: 48
- Website: zhovkva-rada.gov.ua/golovna.html

Zhovkva urban hromada (Ukrainian: Жовківська міська громада) is a hromada in Ukraine, in Lviv Raion of Lviv Oblast. The administrative center is the city of Zhovkva.

== Settlements ==
The hromada consists of 1 city (Zhovkva) and 48 villages:

- Besidy
- Blyshchyvody
- Borovi
- Velyki Peredrymykhy
- Vidrodzhennia
- Volia-Vysotska
- Viazova
- Halasi
- Hlynsk
- Hory
- Derevnia
- Dernivka
- Dibrova
- Zabrid
- Zavady
- Zalozy
- Zamochok
- Zibolky
- Kazumyn
- Kozulka
- Kopanka
- Krekhiv
- Kropy
- Kruta Dolyna
- Kuliava
- Lypnyky
- Liubelia
- Maidan
- Mali Peredrymykhy
- Matsoshyn
- Mokrotyn
- Nahirtsi
- Nova Skvariava
- Oplitna
- Papirnia
- Poliany
- Ruda
- Ruda-Krekhivska
- Sarnivka
- Soposhyn
- Soroky
- Sosnyna
- Stara Skvariava
- Terniv
- Turynka
- Fiina
- Chystopillia
- Shkoliari
