= Ilarion Svientsitskyi =

Ukrainian philologist (1876–1956)

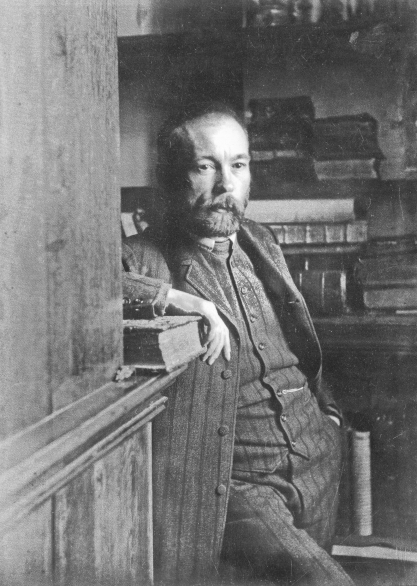
- Svientsitskyi in 1908 at the Andrey Sheptytsky National Museum of Lviv
- Education: Lviv University
- Children: Vira Svientsitska

Ilarion Svientsitskyi (Ukrainian: Іларіон Семенович Свєнціцький; 7 April 1876, Busk, now Lviv Oblast – 18 September 1956, Lviv) was a Ukrainian philologist, ethnographer, museologist, public and cultural figure, Doctor of Philological Sciences from 1902, full member of the Shevchenko Scientific Society from 1914. Organizer and director of the Andrei Sheptytskyi National Museum of Lviv. Father of art historian Vira Svientsitska.

== Works ==
- Опис рукописів Народного дому з колекції Антона Петрушевича (т. 1—3, 1906—1911),
- Бойківський говір села Бітля (1913),
- Основи науки про мову українську (1917),
- Винниченко, спроба літературної характеристики (1920),
- Нариси з історії української мови (1920),
- Шевченко в світлі критики й дійсності (1922),
- Прикраси рукописів Галицької України (кн. 1—3, 1922—1923),
- Початки книгопечатання на землях України (1924),
- Іконопис Галицької України XV—XVI віків (1928),
- Ікони Галицької України XV—XVI віків (1929),
- Різдво Христове в поході віків (історія літературної теми й форми) (1933),
- Суспільне тло творчости Івана Франка (1930),
- Місце Івана Франка в історії української фільольогії (1933),
- Мова Галицько-Волинського літопису (1949).

== Bibliography ==
- В. С. Александрович. Свєнціцький Іларіон Семенович // Енциклопедія історії України : у 10 т. / редкол.: В. А. Смолій (голова) та ін. ; Інститут історії України НАН України. — К. : Наукова думка, 2012. — Т. 9 : Прил — С. — С. 471. — ISBN 978-966-00-1290-5.
- Свєнціцький Іларіон Семенович // Універсальний словник-енциклопедія. — 4-те вид. — К. : Теза, 2006.
- Батіг М. Білі сторінки в історії Національного музею у Львові.
- Батіг М. З історії музею. Минуле // Літопис Національного музею у Львові.
- Горбань І. Багатокультурність музейного ландшафту Львова та музейне життя у тоталітарній державі // Сучасний музей: між скарбницею та підприємством.
- Гумецька Л. Л. Іларіон Семенович Свєнціцький // Мовознавство. — 1976
- Закревська Я. В. Свєнціцький Іларіон Семенович // Енциклопедія «Українська мова». — Київ, 2000.
- Кізлик О. Д., Луцик Ф. Я. І. С. Свєнціцький. Короткий бібліографічний покажчик. — Київ, 1956.
