= Vira Svientsitska =

Ukrainian art historian (1913–1991)

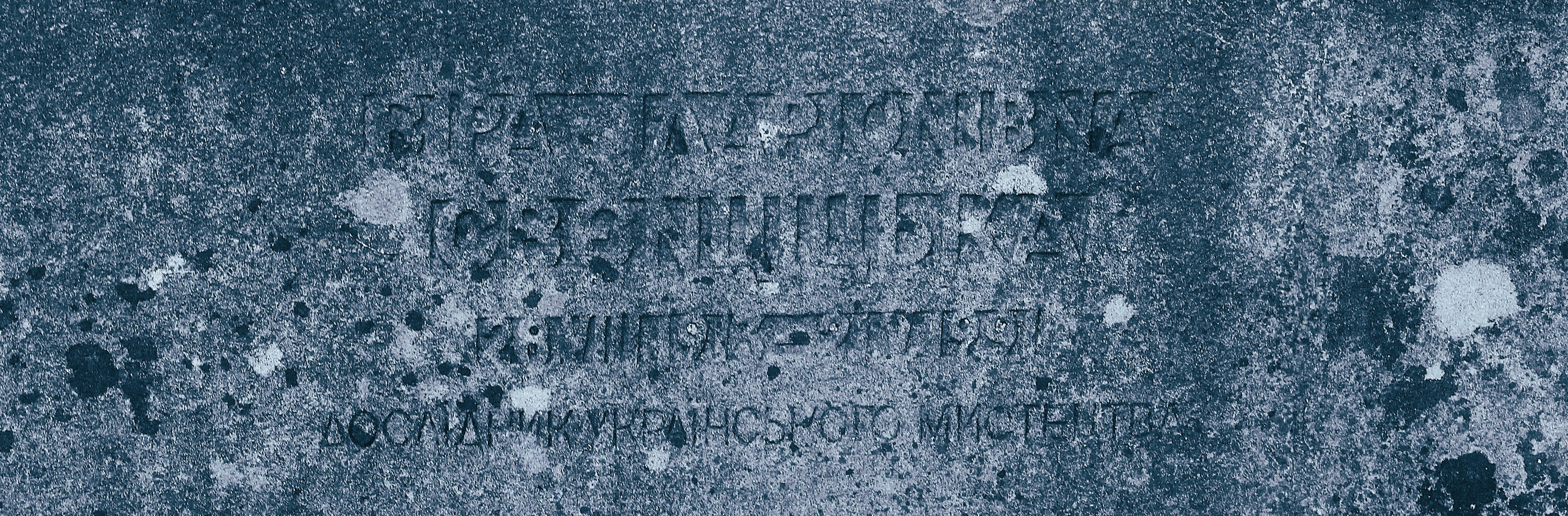
Fragment of an inscription on the tomb of the Svientsitskyi family

Vira Svientsitska (Ukrainian: Віра Іларіонівна Свєнціцька; 28 August 1913, Lviv – 25 May 1991, Lviv) was a Ukrainian art historian. She was the daughter of Ilarion Svientsitskyi.

== Works ==
- Різьблені ручні хрести XVII—XX ст. (1939)
- Іван Руткович і становлення реалізму в укр. малярстві XVII ст. (1966)
- Історія українського мистецтва (vol. 2, 1967): generalization of the results of research on the works of Galician icon painters of the Zhovkva center of masters from the village of Sudova Vyshnia, Lviv circle, etc.
- Спадщина віків: Українське малярство XIV—XVII століть у музейних колекціях Львова (1990)
- Живопис XIV—XVI століть (in 2 vols. Історії українського мистецтва, 1967)
- Словник жовківських майстрів живопису і різьби (in the collection of Українське Мистецтвознавство, book 1, 1967)
- Українське народне малярство XII—XX ст. Світ очима народних митців (the album was released posthumously, 1991; In 1995, along with others, she was posthumously awarded the Shevchenko National Prize)

== Bibliography ==
- В. С. Александрович. Свєнціцька Віра Іларіонівна // Енциклопедія історії України : у 10 т. / редкол.: В. А. Смолій (голова) та ін. ; Інститут історії України НАН України. — К. : Наукова думка, 2012. — Т. 9 : Прил — С. — С. 470. — ISBN 978-966-00-1290-5.
- Енциклопедія українознавства : Словникова частина : [в 11 т.] / Наукове товариство імені Шевченка ; гол. ред. проф., д-р Володимир Кубійович. — Париж — Нью-Йорк : Молоде життя, 1955—1995. — ISBN 5-7707-4049-3.
- Свєнціцькі // Мистецтво України : Біографічний довідник. / упоряд.: А. В. Кудрицький, М. Г. Лабінський ; за ред. А. В. Кудрицького. — Київ : «Українська енциклопедія» імені М. П. Бажана, 1997. — С. 700 с. . — ISBN 5-88500-071-9. — С. 527—528.
- Петро Мірчук Нарис історії ОУН 1920—1939 роки, К., Українська Видавнича Спілка 2007, 1006 ст. ISBN 966-410-001-3.
