= Liubov Voloshyn =

Ukrainian art historian (born 1942)

- Любов Василівна Волошин
- Born: 12 March 1942 (age 84); Lviv
- Education: Lviv Medical Institute, Leningrad Institute of Painting, Sculpture and Architecture
- Awards: Merited Figure of Arts of Ukraine

Liubov Voloshyn (Ukrainian: Любов Василівна Волошин; born 12 March 1942) is a Ukrainian art historian. Member of the National Union of Artists of Ukraine (2002), full member of the Shevchenko Scientific Society.

== Biography ==
Liubov Voloshyn was born on 12 March 1942 in Lviv.

In 1966, she graduated from the Lviv Medical Institute, and in 1972 from the Faculty of Theory and History of Art of the Leningrad Institute of Painting, Sculpture and Architecture. From then on, she worked at the Andrey Sheptytsky National Museum of Lviv: senior researcher (1975–1989), head (1989–2015) of the Oleksa Novakivskyi Art Memorial Museum in Lviv. From 2015, he has been a senior researcher at the Department of Contemporary Art at the Andrei Sheptytskyi National Museum in Lviv.

== Works ==
She is the author of publications on Ukrainian art of the late 19th and early 20th centuries, in particular on prominent artists of the early period of modern Ukrainian art – Modest Sosenko, Olena Kulchytska, Ivan Severyn, Ivan Trush, Petro Kholodnyi, Mykhailo Boichuk, Antin Manastyrskyi, and Mykhailo Kozyk. She devoted her main works to the work of Oleksa Novakivskyi, as well as his art school and students.

Monographs:

- Mystetska shkola Oleksy Novakivskoho u Lvovi: Bibliohrafichnyi slovnyk uchniv (Lviv, 1998),
- Kniazhyi darunok velykoho metsenata. Mytropolyt Andrei Sheptytskyi u zhytti i tvorchosti Oleksy Novakivskoho (Lviv, 2001),
- Avtoportrety Oleksy Novakivskoho (Lviv, 2004),
- Probudzhennia u malarstvi ta rysunkakh O. Novakivskoho (Lviv, 2005),
- Roman Selskyi. Zhyvopys. Hrafika. Albom (Lviv, 2006),
- Istorychni postati kniazhoi doby u tvorakh O. Novakivskoho (Lviv, 2007),
- Rannia hrafika Sviatoslava Hordynskoho. 1920–1930 roky (Lviv, 2007),
- Naukovyi kataloh maliarskykh tvoriv Oleksy Novakivskoho (Lviv, 2008),
- Yaroslav Lukavetskyi (Lviv, 2008),
- Olha Pleshkan (Lviv, 2010),
- Khydozhno-memorialnyi muzei Oleksy Novakivskoho. Putivnyk (Lviv, 2012),
- Ivanna Nyzhnyk-Vynnykiv. Rannia tvorchist u Lvovi. 1920—1930 rr. (Lviv, 2013),
- Ivanna Nyzhnyk-Vynnykiv. Tvorchist na emihratsii. Nimechyna, Frantsiia. 1945—1993 rr. (Lviv, 2015),
- Mytropolyt Andrei Sheptytskyi u tvorchykh doliakh ukrainskykh khudozhnykiv (Lviv; Vol. I, 2015; Vol. II, 2016; Vol. III, 2017),
- Obraz zhinky u tvorakh Oleksy Novakivskoho (Kharkiv, 2018),
- Mystetska shkola Oleksy Novakivskoho 1923–1935. Zhyttia u perspektyvi chasu (Drohobych, 2025),
- Mariia Krompets-Morachevska. Mytets i pedahoh (Lviv, 2025).

Albums:

- Liubomyr Medvid. Prytchi (Lviv, 1995),
- Roman Selskyi. Hrafika (Lviv, 2006),
- Bohdan Brateiko. Zhyvopys, hrafika (Lviv, 2006),
- Roman Selskyi. Instytut kolektsionerstva ukrainskykh pamiatok pry NTS (Lviv, 2006),
- Yaroslav Krushelnytskyi (Lviv, 2008),
- Sakralne mystetstvo Hryhoriia Petryshaka (Lviv, 2008),
- Oleksa Novakivskyi (Lviv, 2009),
- Oleksa Novakivskyi (1872–1935) (Lviv, 2012),
- Ivan Klymko. Keramichna plastyka (Lviv, 2013).

== Awards ==
- Merited Figure of Arts of Ukraine (3 March 2006),
- Ilarion and Vira Svientsitskyi Prize,
- Sviatoslav Hordynskyi Prize,
- Pavlo Chubynskyi Prize,
- Gold Medal of the Academy of Arts of Ukraine.
