= Oleksa Novakivskyi =

Ukrainian painter and art teacher (1872–1935)

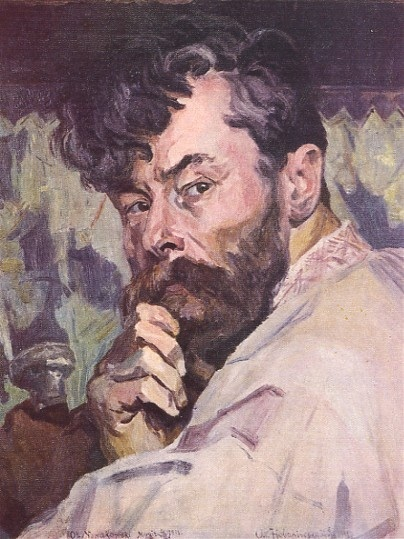
Self-portrait (1911)

Oleksa Kharlampiyovych Novakivskyi (Ukrainian: Оле́кса Харла́мпійович Новакі́вський; 14 March 1872, Obodivka, Trostianets Raion, Vinnytsia Oblast — 29 August 1935, Lviv) whose last name is also written as Novakivs´kyi was a Ukrainian Impressionist painter and art teacher.

== Biography ==
Oleksa Novakivskyi was born to a forester who worked at the estate of an aristocratic Polish family. A local nobleman took note of his talent and provided the means for him to pursue an artistic education. From 1888 to 1892, Novakivskyi studied in Odessa with the watercolorist and decorative painter, Filip Klimenko. Further support enabled him to transfer to the Kraków Academy of Fine Arts, where he worked, among others, with Jan Matejko and Leon Wyczółkowski. He graduated in 1900.

For about ten years, Novakivskyi lived in the village of Mogiła, now part of Nowa Huta near Kraków. He shared a house with an elderly widow whose daughter he later married. Novakivskyi's first exhibit was with the Society for the Development of Ruthenian Art, in 1901, but he achieved little attention until his personal exhibition in Kraków in 1911.

In 1913 the painter moved to Lviv, where he received patronage of the Metropolitan Archbishop, Andrey Sheptytsky. Shortly after, he started his own art school. Most of the noted painters of early twentieth-century Galicia studied there, at least briefly.

Novakivskyi's most successful exhibition came in 1921. From 1924 to 1925, he was Dean of Arts at the Secret Ukrainian University.

Oleksa Novakivkskyi died in 1935 and is buried in Lychakiv Cemetery.

== Legacy ==
In 1940 20 paitings by Novakivskyi stored in the funds of the Andrey Sheptytsky National Museum of Lviv were taken to Moscow, where they became part of an exhibition dedicated to first anniversary of the Soviet annexation of Western Ukraine. Those works have never been returned to Lviv and their fate remains unknown.

In 1972, the Oleksa Novakivskyi Memorial Art Museum was established in Lviv.

== Personal life ==
On 10 August 1914, soon after the start of the First World War, Novakivskyi married his long-term partner and muse Anna-Maria Palmowska, a native of Mogiła near Kraków, who was a model for many of his paintings. The couple was wed in Lviv, with the ceremony being performed by metropolitan Andrey Sheptytsky. The harmonious relationship between Novakivskyi and Palmowska is testified by numerous letters from the painter's archive; with time, Anna-Maria, whose native language was Polish, started corresponding with her man in Ukrainian. The couple had two sons. Palmowska's premature death in April 1925 was a heavy blow for the family; her depictions consinued to be present in Novakivskyi's works during the following years.

== Selected Paintings ==
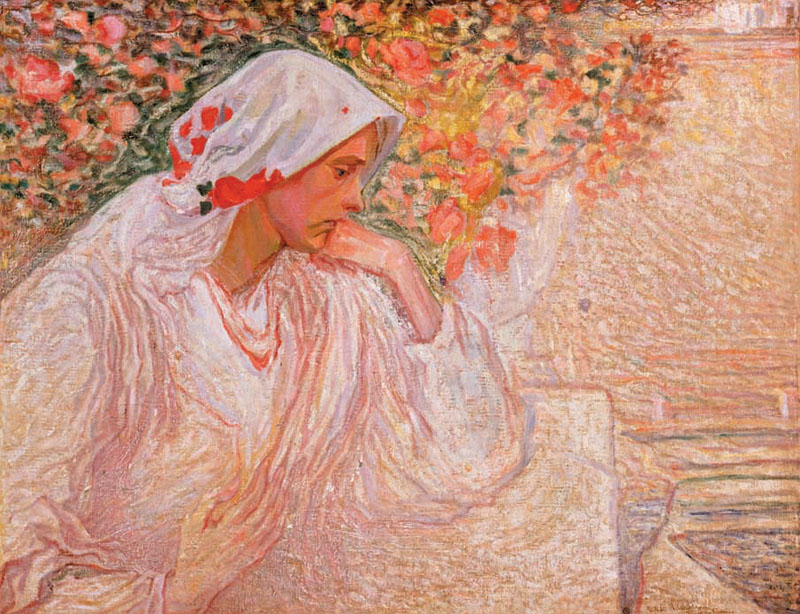
In Thought (portrait of the painter's wife)

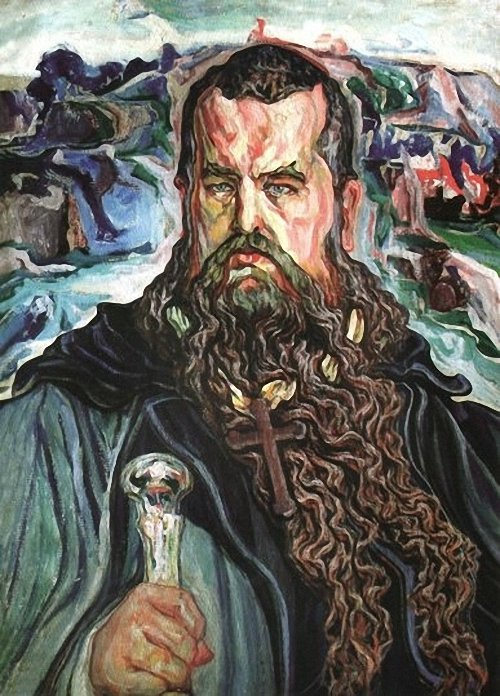
Count Andrey Sheptytsky

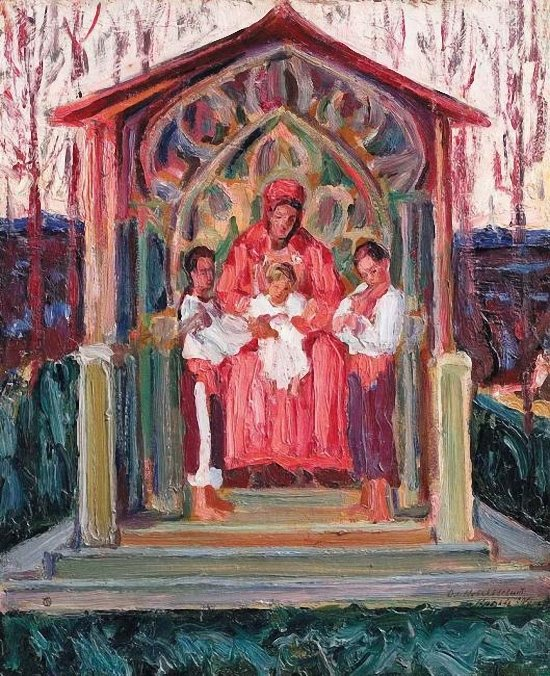
Ukrainian Madonna

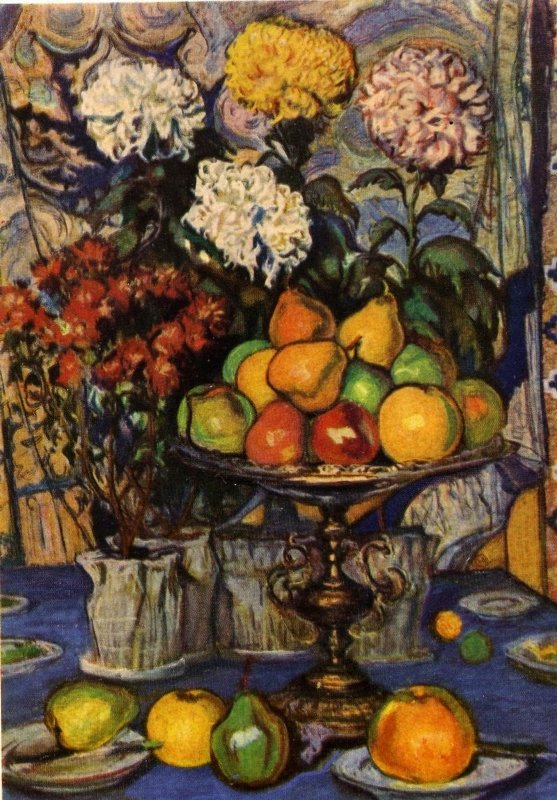
Still-life

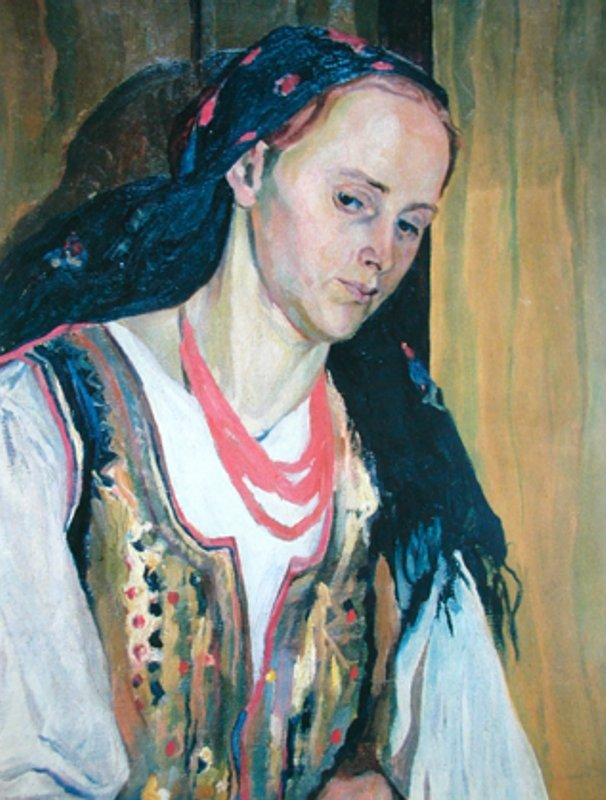
The Artist's Wife

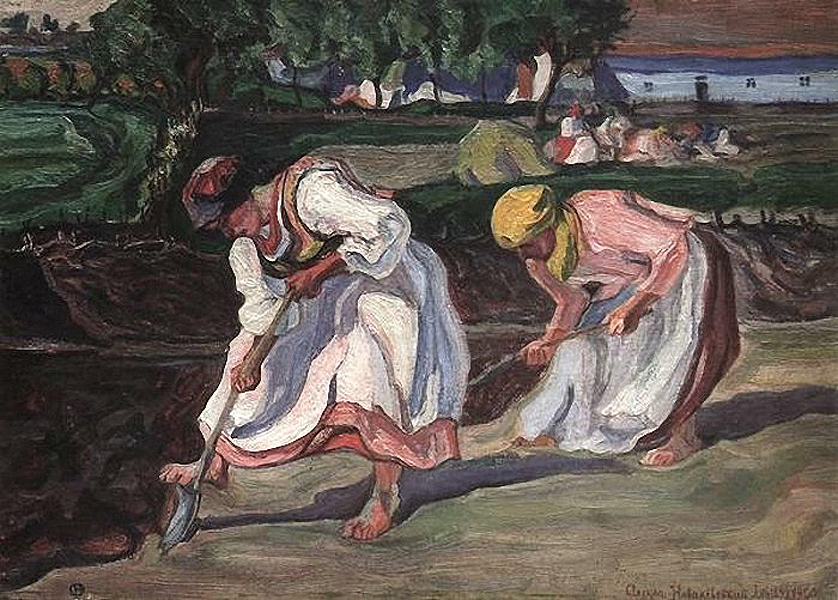
Digging in the Garden

== See also ==
- Ivan Holubovskyi
- Liubov Voloshyn
- Natalka Prystai-Ohonovska
- Emiliia Okhrymovych-Holubovska

== Bibliography ==
- L. Voloshyn (2024). Мистецька школа Олекси Новаківського 1923-1935. Життя у перспективі часу (in Ukrainian). Lviv–Drohobych: Kolo. 552 pp. ISBN 978-617-642-676-9.
