= Icon painting in Ukraine =

Type of religious art in Ukraine

The tradition of icon painting in Ukraine dates from the 10th century, beginning with the adoption of Christianity in the area.

== History ==
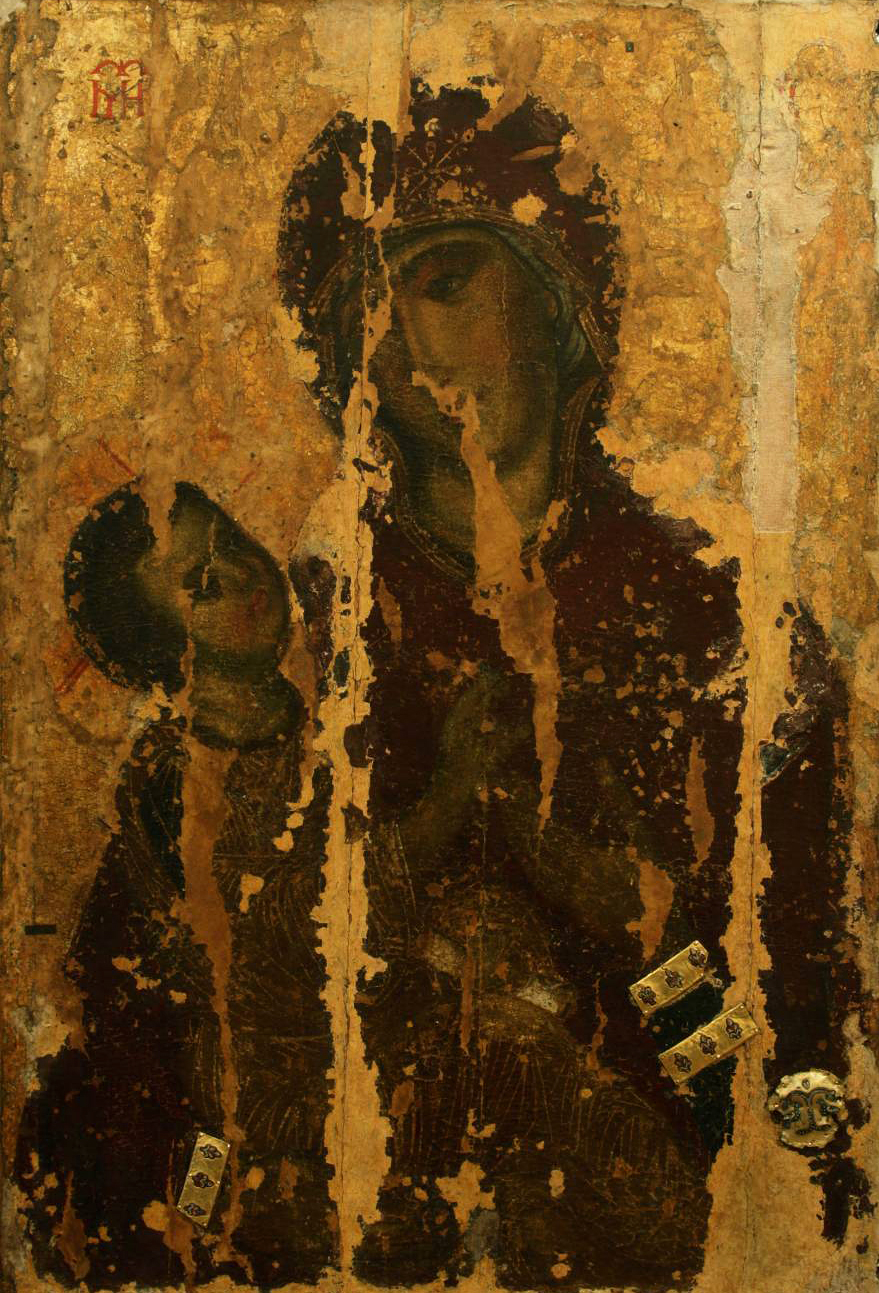
Kholm Icon of the Mother of God, 11th century, now exhibited in Lutsk

The first Christian icons in the territory of modern Ukraine were of Greek origin: according to chronicles, Church of the Tithes in Kyiv was decorated with icons brought by prince Volodymyr from Chersonesus. The oldest preserved icons stemming from the Rus' era come from the 11-12th centuries and include such notable works as the Virgin of Vladimir (now stored in Tretyakov Gallery in Moscow), Igor's Icon of the Mother of God (now in Kyiv Pechersk Lavra), Pechersk Mother of God, Icon of Saints Boris and Gleb, Mezhyhirya Icon of the Saviour, Virgin of Smolensk, Kholm Icon of the Mother of God etc.

Historically, numerous masters from Ukrainian lands spread their tradition of icon painting to neighbouring countries. For example, Peter of Rata worked in Moscow, and several Galician painters from the 14th-15th centuries became prominent in the lands of Lithuania, Belarus and Poland. In the Pechersk monastery a native school of icon painting was created by Alypius of the Caves and his companion Gregory. In 1259 icons created in Kyiv were used by Daniel of Galicia to adorn a newly built church constructed by him in Kholm. In the 15th century activities of icon painters' guilds were documented in Lviv and Peremyshl. During the ages of Renaissance and Baroque icon painting in Ukrainian lands started to abandon its strictly Byzantine character and adopted more realistic forms, as well as elements of folk painting. Traditional icons experienced a decline in the 18-19th centuries due to the mass adoption of oil techniques, but saw a resurgence in the early 20th-century "Neo-Byzantine" school, represented by Mykhaylo Boychuk, Modest Sosenko, Petro Kholodnyi, Mykhailo Osinchuk, Vasyl Diadyniuk and other artists working both in Ukraine and in the diaspora. Iconography can also be a joint and even a familial affair, like in the case of the Heaven on Earth workshop.

In the 2020s, Ukrainian icon painters have been covered in the media for their use of repurposed war materials, such as boxes used to carry ammunition or body armor used by Ukrainian soldiers.

== Subjects ==
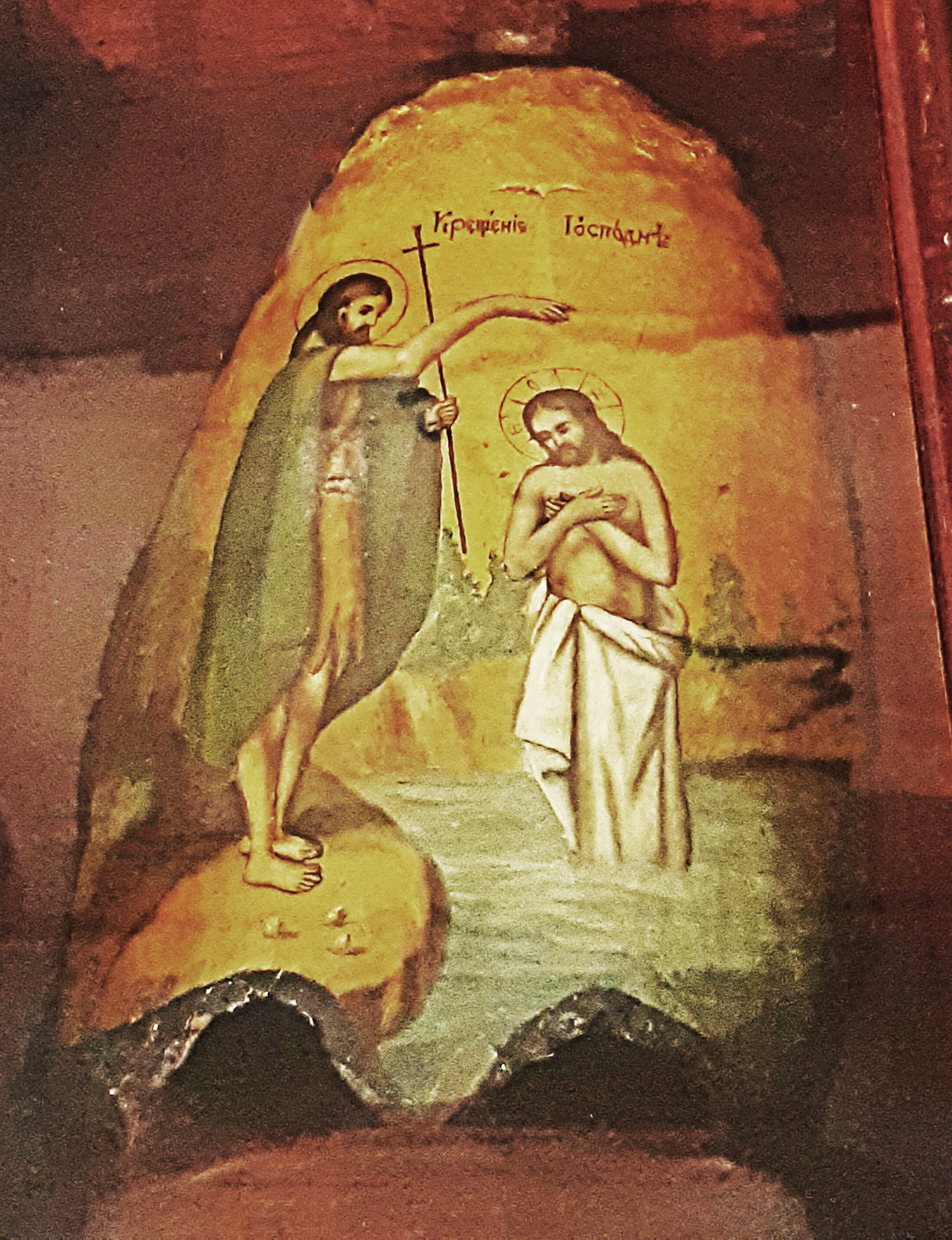
Icon painted on the head of a catfish exhibited in Kyiv Pechersk Lavra

Initially based on Byzantine examples, Ukrainian icon painting gradually adopted elements of folk culture and included local landscapes, elements of clothing and daily life as well as heroes from native canon. The most popular types of icons in Ukrainian culture are related to the Mother of God: Hodegetria (companion in travel), Orans (praying Mary), Presentation of Mary, Queen of Heaven, Lady Protectress etc. In Ukraine, icons are traditionally present in every Christian household. Many icons are also dedicated to Saint Nicholas, John the Baptist, Archangels Michael and Gabriel, holy martyrs George and Demetrius, Fathers of the Church and local saints such as princes Boris and Gleb, Anthony and Theodosius of Pechersk etc. A large number of icons depict events such as Nativity of Mary, Birth and Baptism of Jesus, Crucifixion, Descent to Hell, Assumption of Mary. Many religious murals in Ukrainian tradition also repeat motives from icons.

== Techniques ==
During the era of Ukrainian Baroque, icons would frequently be adorned with gold elements and included lavish ornaments depicting flowers, fruit and plants. Embroidered icons including elements of golden and silver thread, which had been known since Rus times, were popularized by Maria Mazepa, the mother of Ukrainian Cossack hetman Ivan Mazepa, who served as a hegumena in one of Kyiv's monasteries.

A unique tradition of icon painting emerged among wandering chumaks in the south of Ukraine, who would paint icons on dried fish such as flounder.

== In museums ==
Important collections of Ukrainian icons are stored in the National Art Museum of Ukraine in Kyiv and the Andrey Sheptytsky National Museum of Lviv. A separate museum dedicated to icons of Volhynia is active in Lutsk. A rich exposition of icons stemming from Northern Ukraine is located in the Ancient Chernihiv national reserve.

During the ongoing Russian invasion of Ukraine, some museums, including the Khanenko Museum in Kyiv, have chosen to move their icons abroad.

== Notable Ukrainian icon painters ==
- Ivan Rutkovych - native of Zhovkva, author of several icons combining elements of Byzantine and Baroque style, active in late 17th - early 18th century
- Job Kondzelevych - contemporary of Rutkovych
- Mykola Kasperovych - follower of famous Ukrainian painter Mykhaylo Boychuk
- Sofiya Nalepinska-Boychuk - wife and colleague of Mykahylo Boychuk
- Ostap Lozynskyi - icon painter and art collector, son of Taras Lozynskyi

== Gallery ==
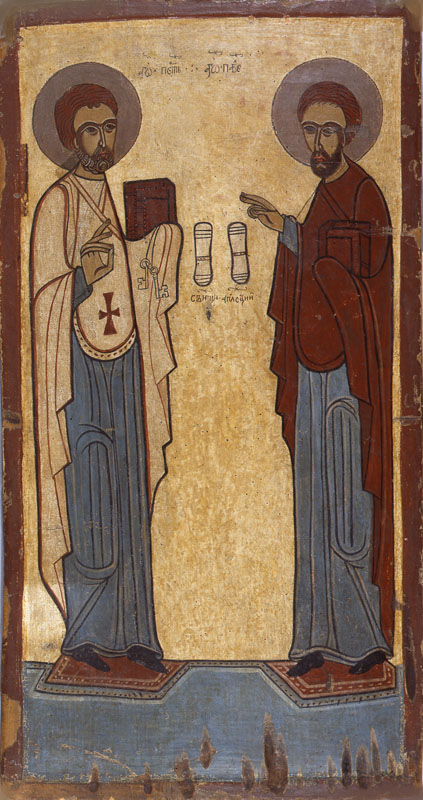
Saints Peter and Paul, 13-14th century, Ivan Honchar Museum

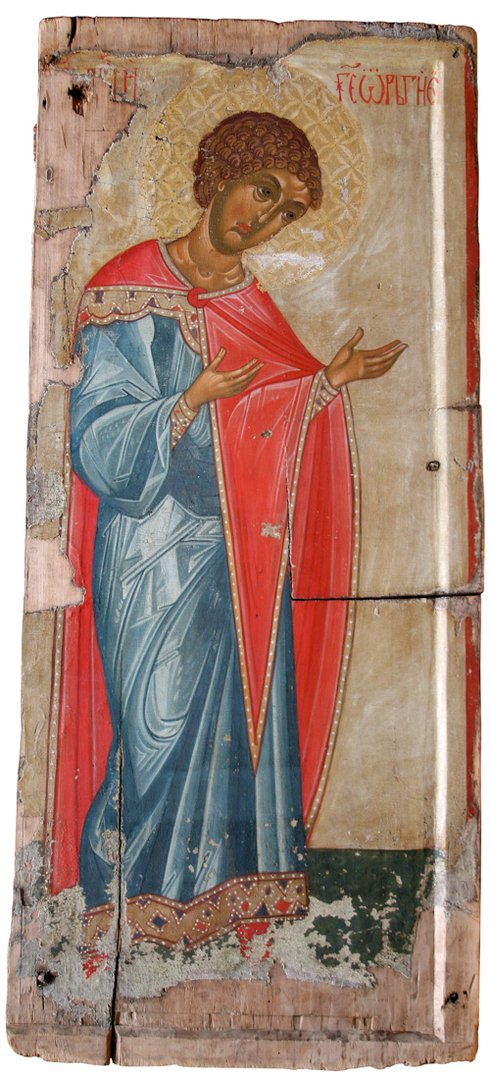
Icon of Saint George from Turie, 15th century

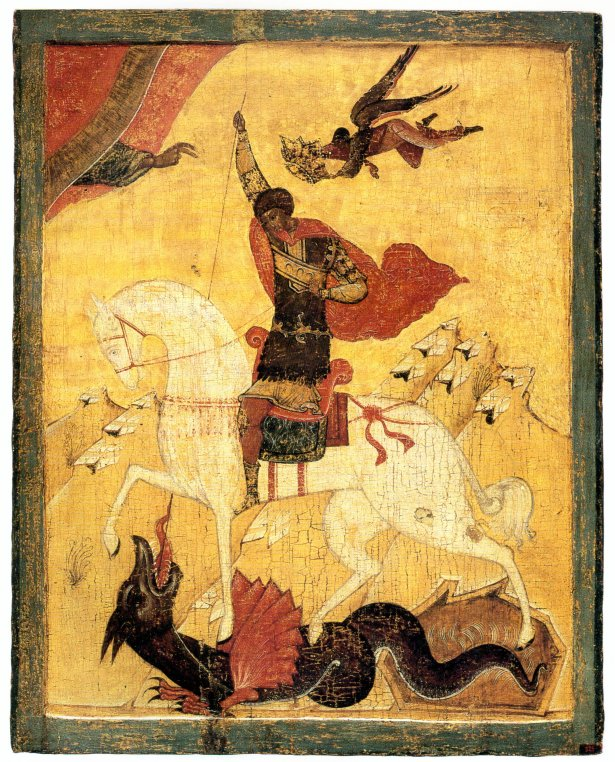
Saint George, Kholm school, 16th century

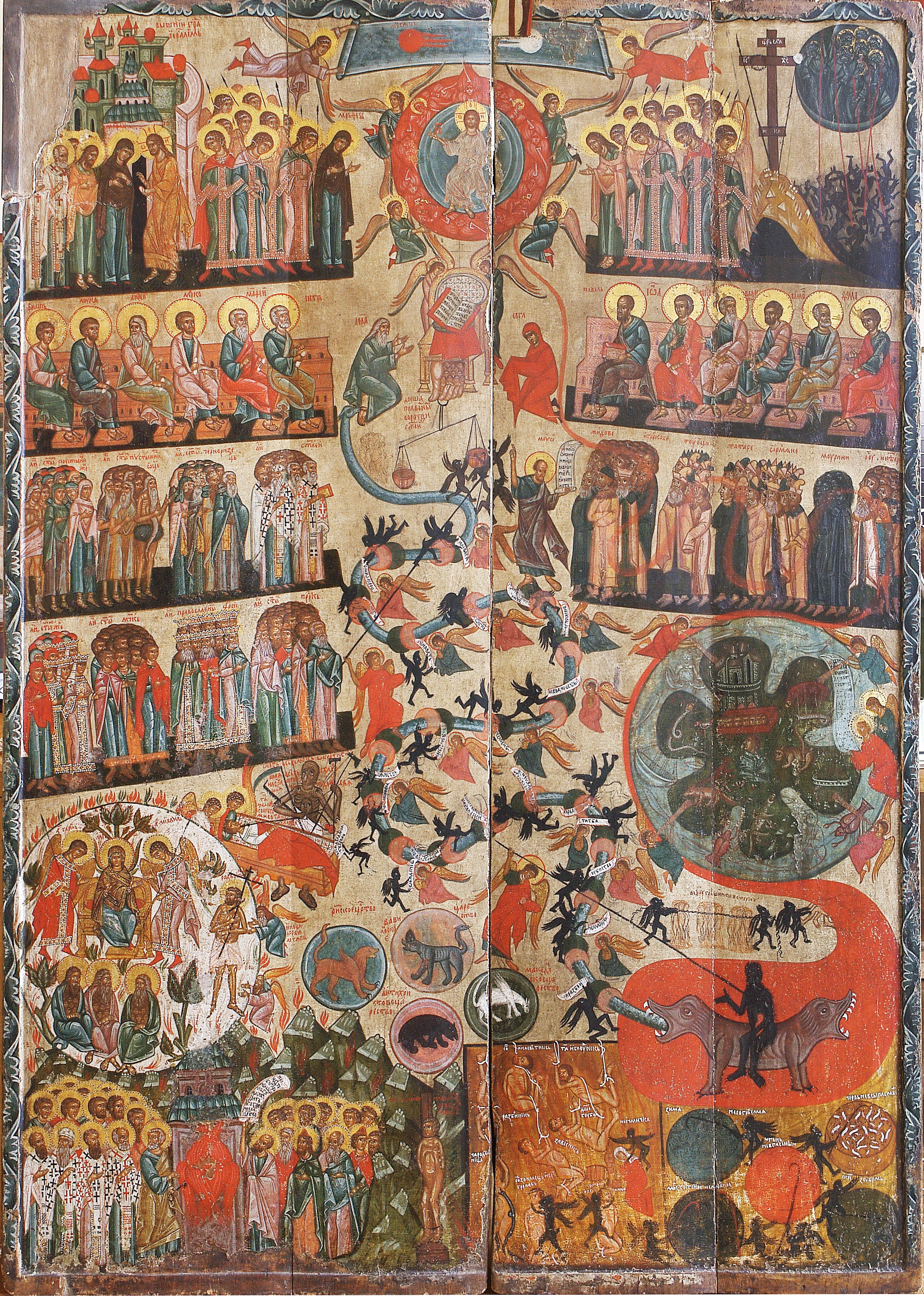
Icon of the Last Judgment from Mshanets, 1560s

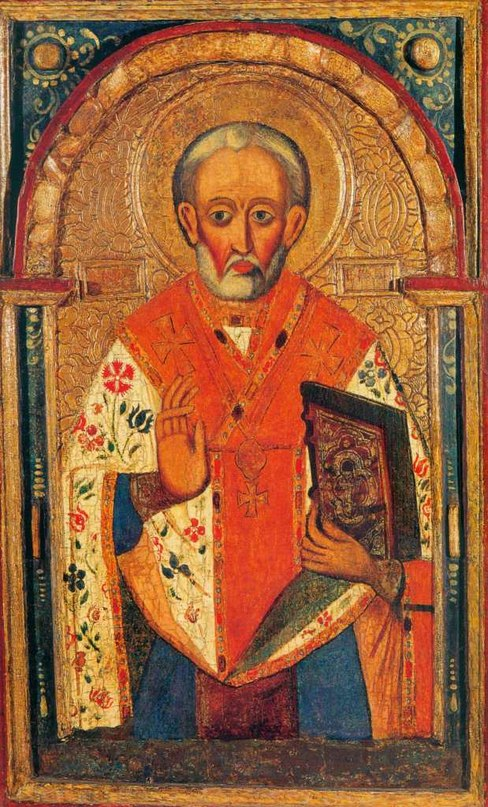
Icon of Saint Nicholas, Oster, 17th century

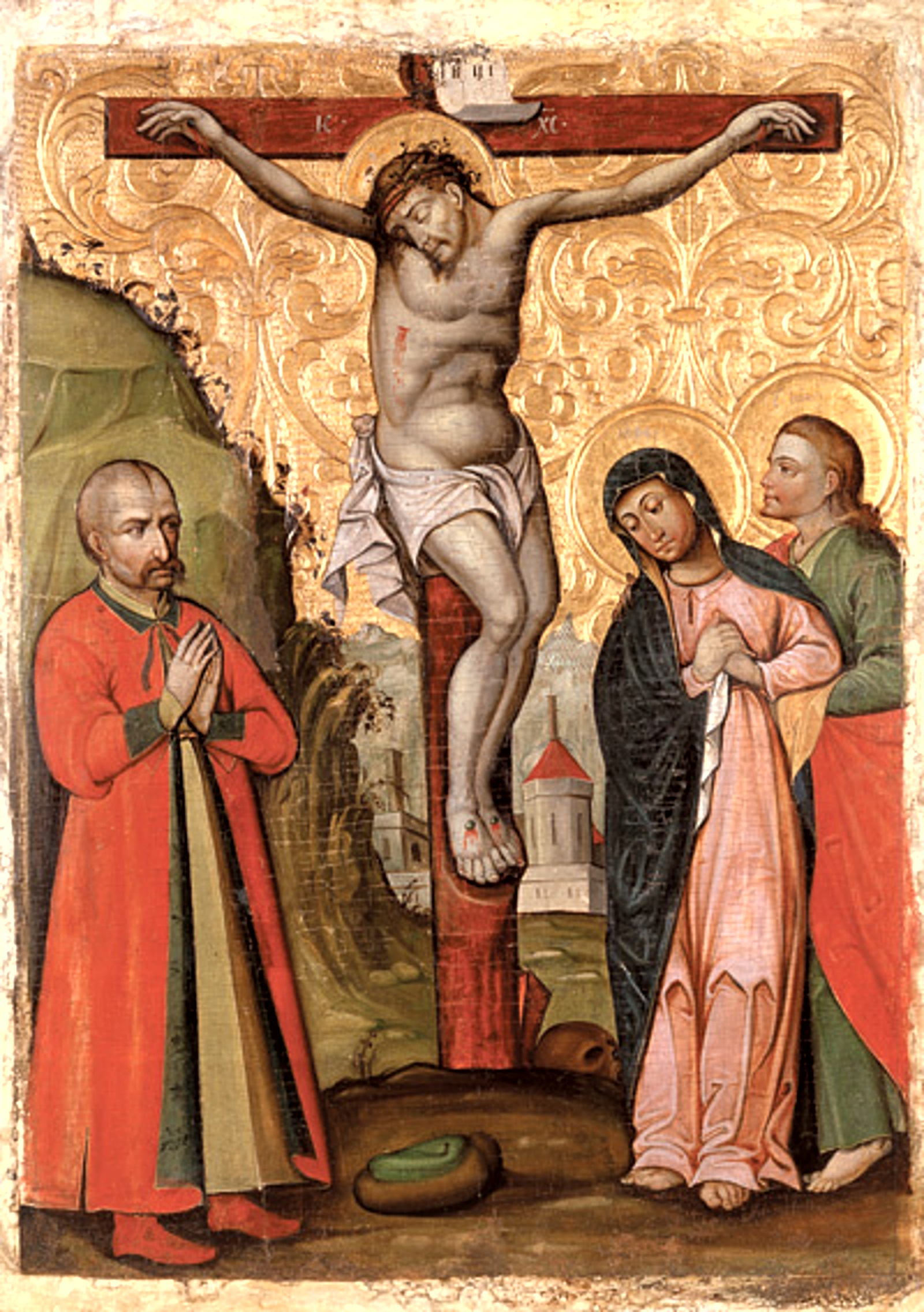
Icon of Crucifixion from Pyriatyn, c. 1699, depicting Lubny colonel Leontiy Svichka on the left

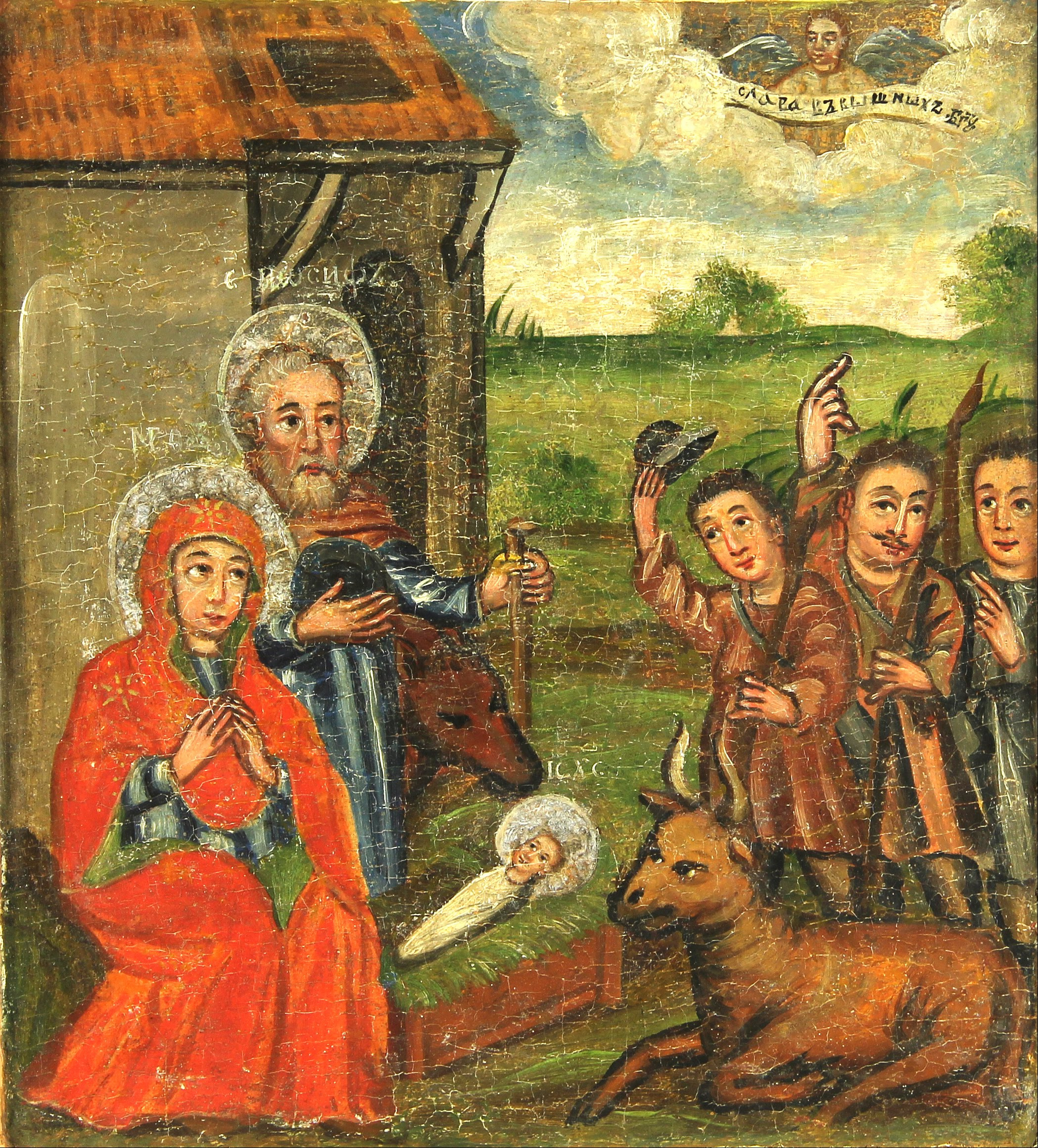
Adoration of the Shepherds, 2nd half of the 17th century, Ivan Honchar Museum

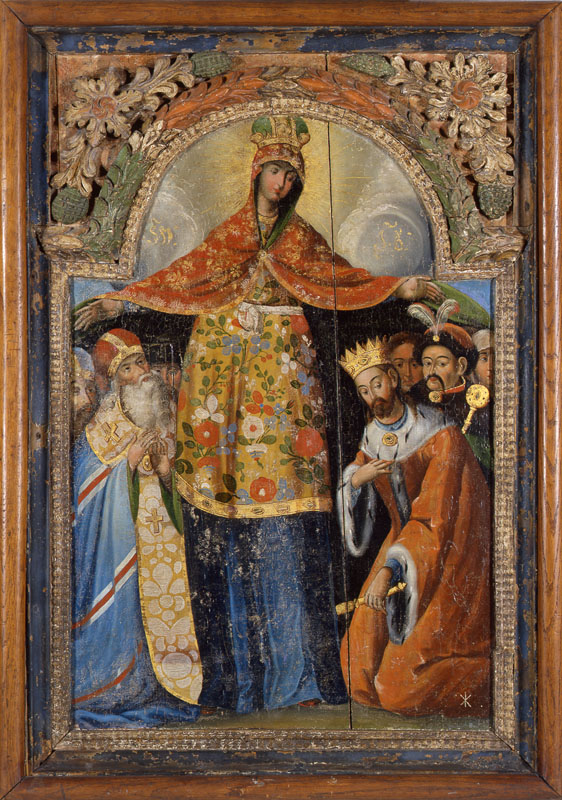
Icon of the Intercession of the Theotokos depicting Bohdan Khmelnytskyi, late 17th-early 18th century, Kyiv region

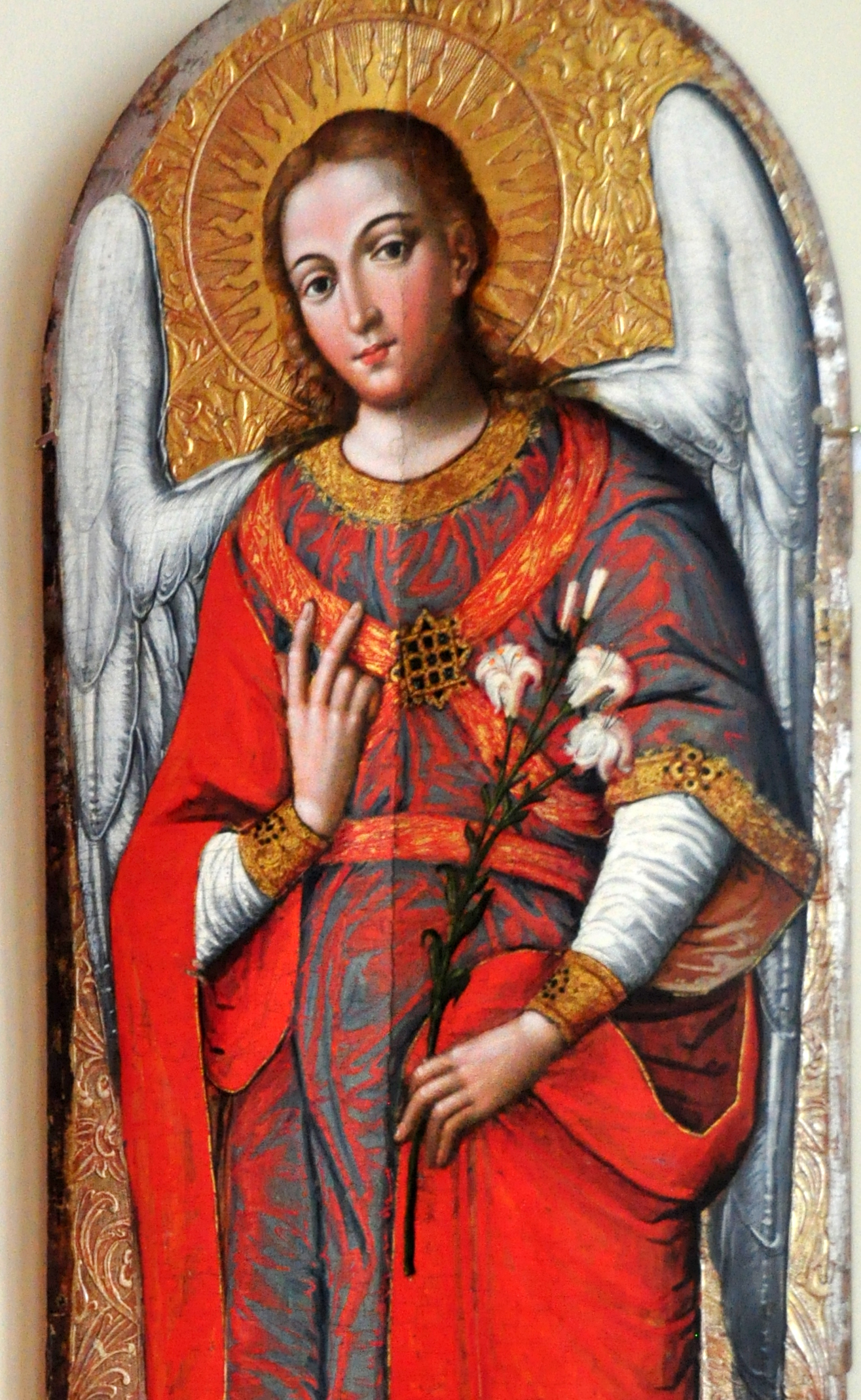
Archangel Gabriel, Ivan Rutkovych, 1697-1699

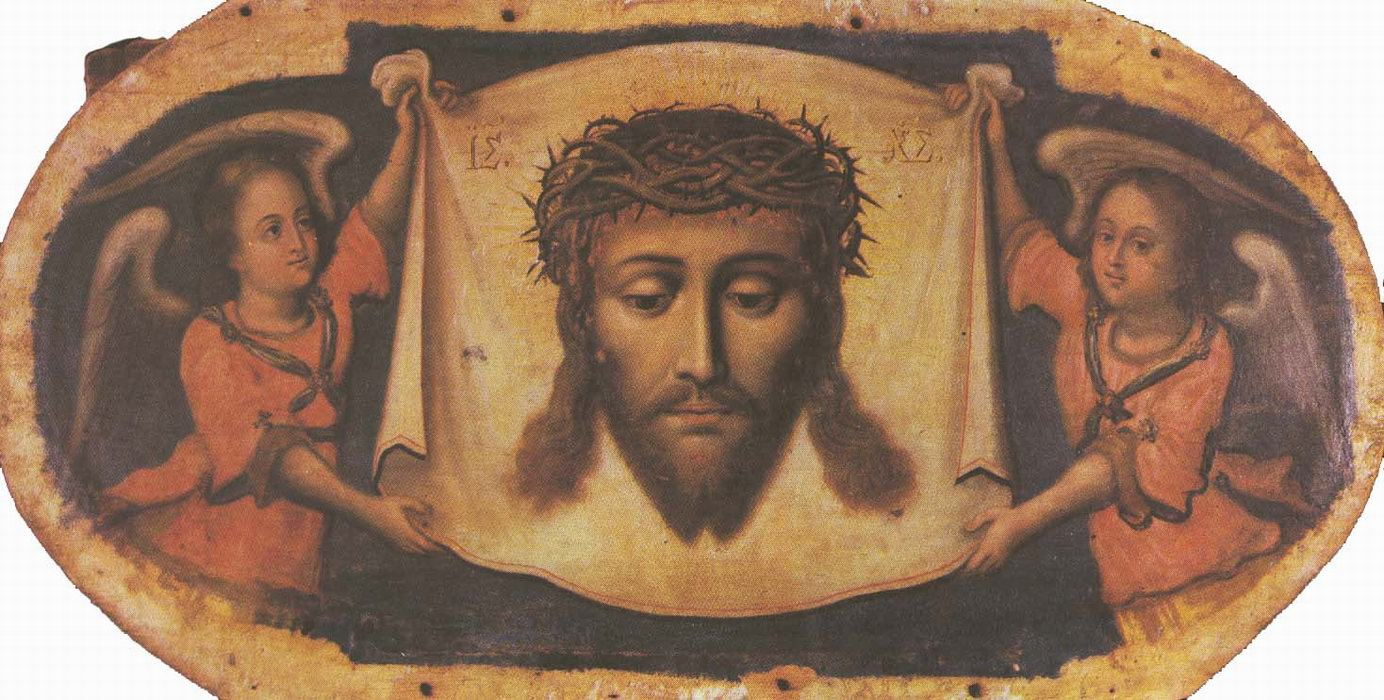
Icon of Jesus Christ from the Bohorodchany iconostasis, Job Kondzelevych, 1698-1705

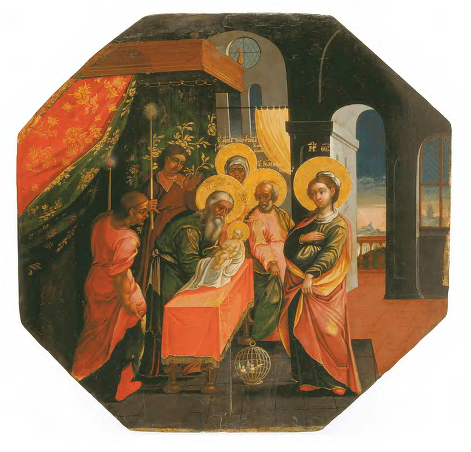
The Presentation of Christ in the Temple, iconostasis of the Dormition Cathedral, Kyiv Pechersk Lavra, 1729

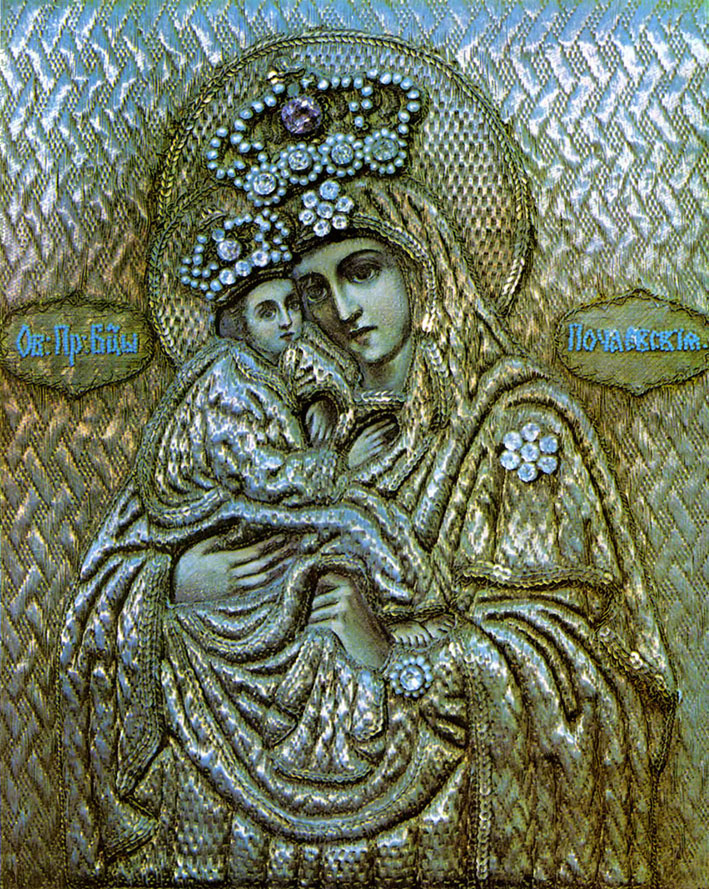
Theotokos of Pochayiv (18th century embroidered copy)

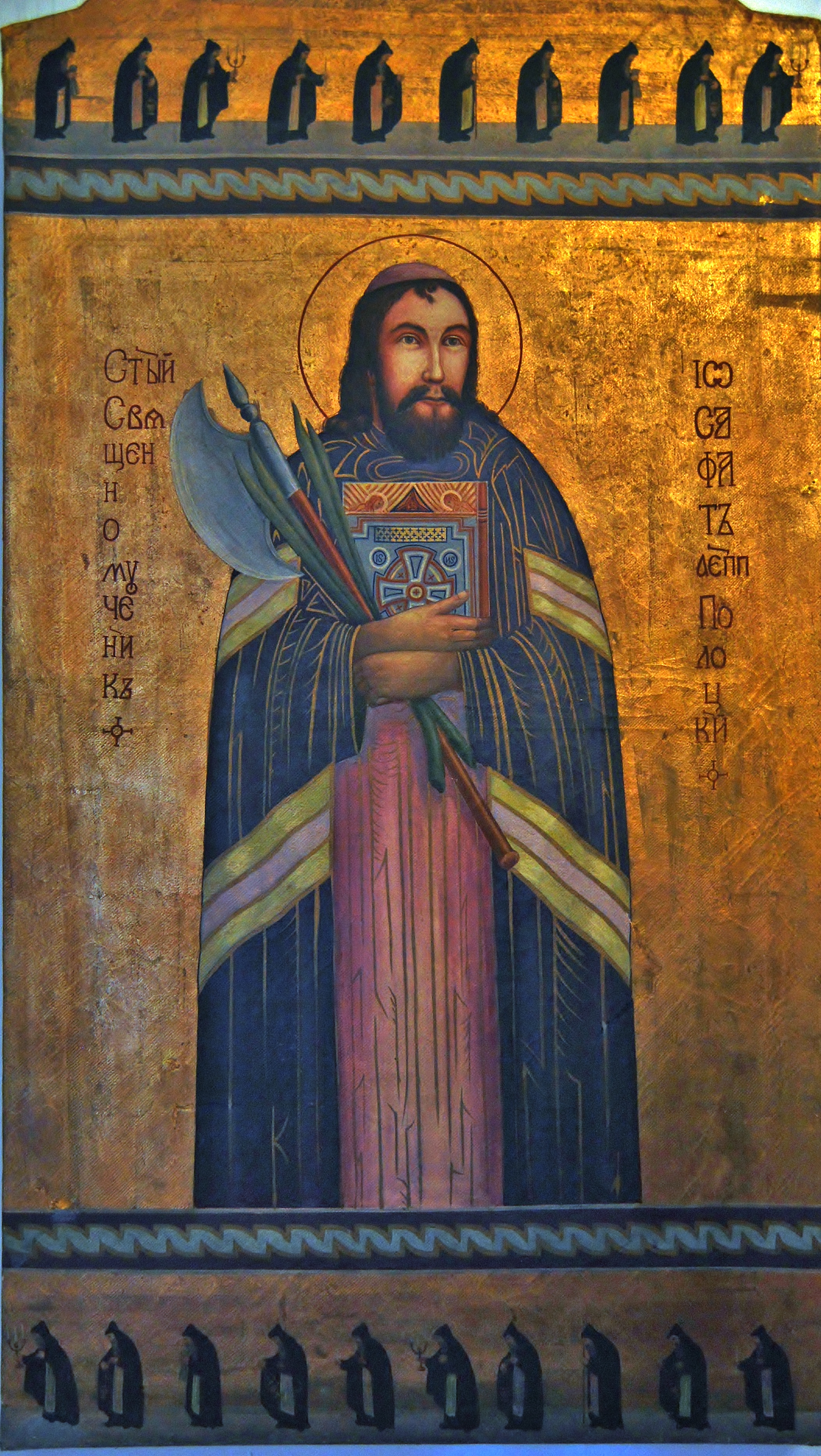
Icon of Saint Josaphat, Zbarazh, 19th century

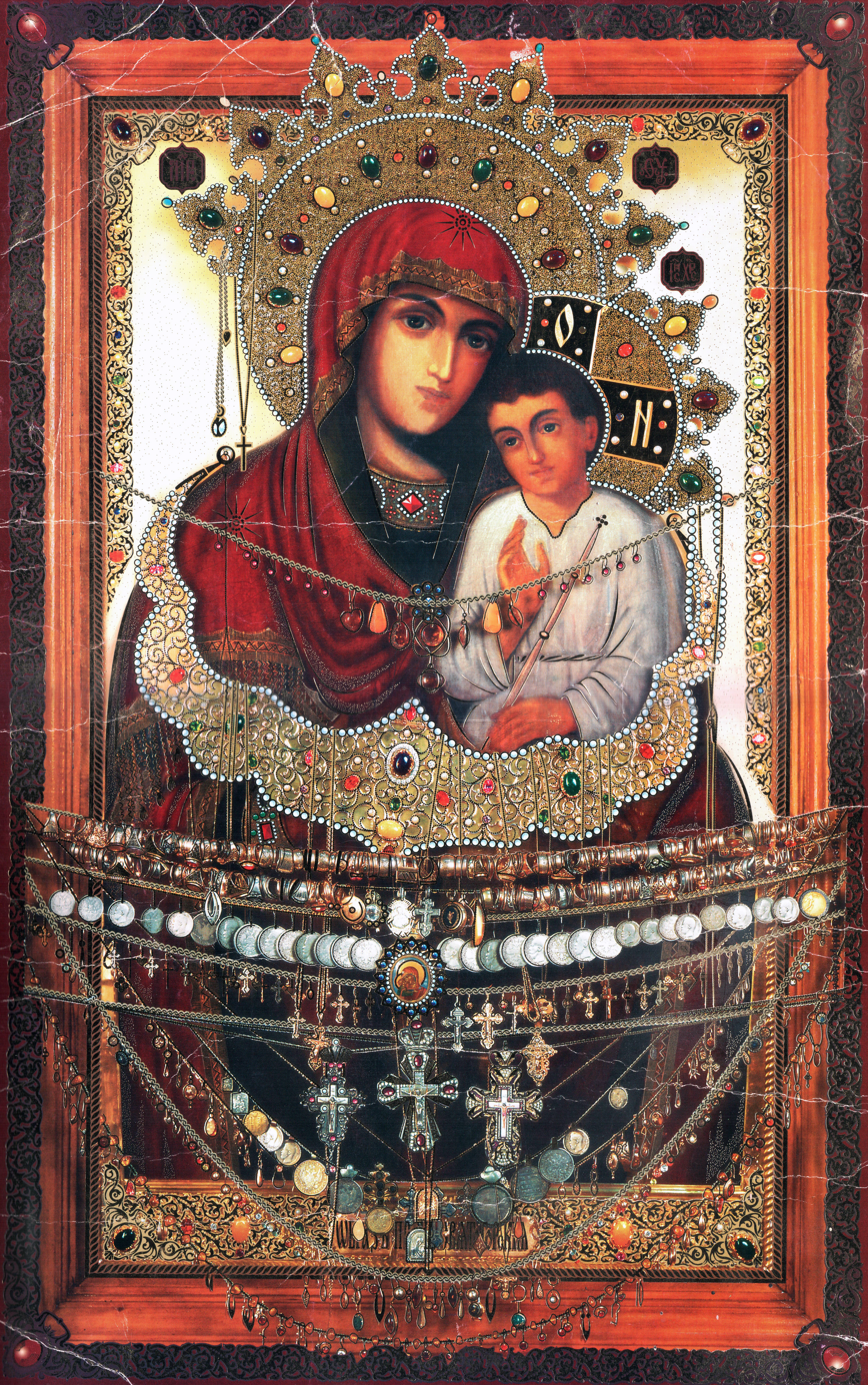
Icon of the Mother of God from Sviatohirsk Lavra, mid-19th century

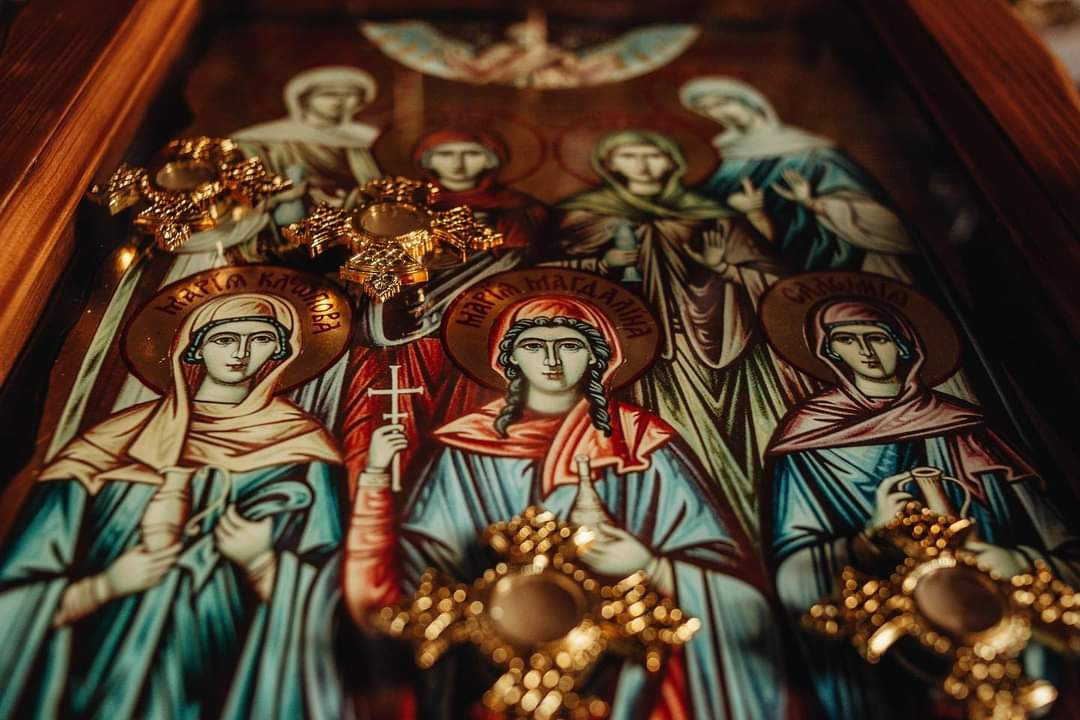
Icons in the church of the Holy Myrrhbearers in Bolekhiv

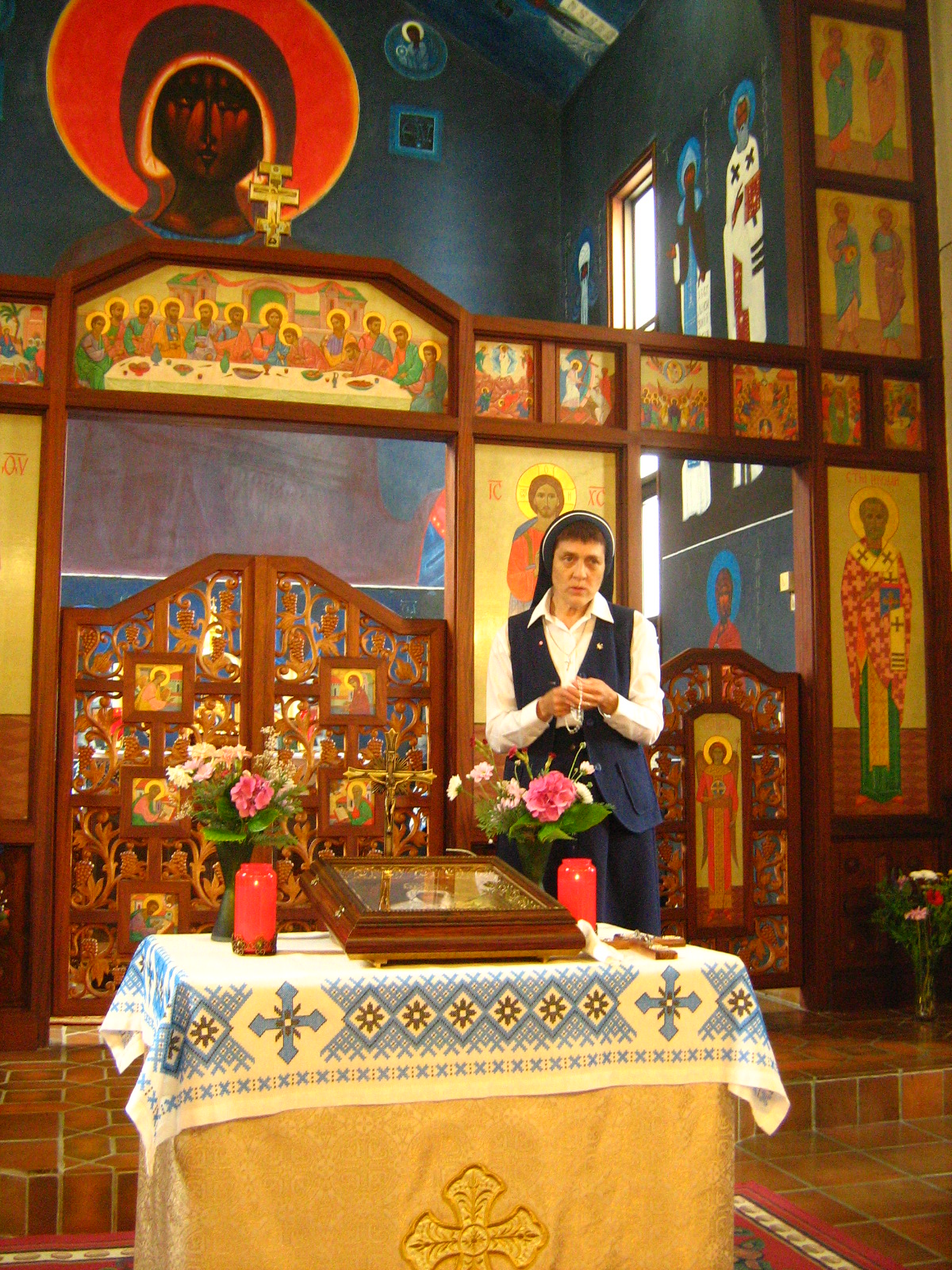
Iconostasis of the Ukrainian Catholic Church in Lourdes, created by Petro Cholodny
