= Heaven on Earth (workshop) =

Ukrainian iconography workshop

- Небо на землі
- Formation: 2004; 22 years ago
- Founder: Priest Sergii Pavelko
- Founded at: Mykolaiv, Ukraine
- Type: Familial iconography workshop
- Headquarters: Kyiv, Ukraine
- Fields: Icon painting; theology; art history; religious art; hot enamel
- Website: ikona.ua

The Familial Iconography Workshop "HEAVEN ON EARTH" (Ukrainian: сімейна іконописна майстерня «НЕБО НА ЗЕМЛІ») is a religious art workshop based in Ukraine. It was founded by Priest Sergii Pavelko in 2004 in Mykolaiv. The workshop works in the field of contemporary icon painting, combining traditional icon-making techniques with the artists' own interpretations of Christian iconography and seeking new ways of presenting sacred imagery. In 2016, the workshop moved from Mykolaiv to Kyiv. Thus its works and exhibitions became known as Kyivan. The Ukrainian-language names "NEBO NA ZEMLI" and "IKONA" are trademarked by the workshop.

== History ==
The "Most Holy Theotokos the Healer" icon, based on older descriptions

The workshop was founded in Mykolaiv, Ukraine in 2004 with the initiative of Priest Sergii Pavelko. In its first years, its work was linked to the updating of traditional iconography and usage of ancient icon-making techniques. Publications regarding the workshop's activities noted that traditional materials and techniques were employed, and that icon painting was viewed not merely as an artistic craft but also as a form of spiritual contemplation of Christian images.

In 2007, the workshop presented the exhibition "May They All Be One" in Lviv, organized jointly with Ivanka Krypiakevych-Dymyd. The exhibition was held at the Andrey Sheptytsky National Museum of Lviv.

From 2008 to 2010, the workshop held exhibitions in Kyiv, including the Ivan Honchar Museum. In 2010, the "PER ASPERA AD ASTRUM" exhibition project was held in the museum. There, modern icons were shown in a dark environment. In 2011, the "Light in the Dark" exhibiton was hosted by the Lviv ICONART gallery. It tackles the concepts of dark and light with the works placed in a dark environment, and visitors viewed them using flashlights. The centerpiece of the project was "Christ – The Angel of the Great Counsel".

"The Last Supper" icon, 2014

In 2013, the exhibition "Eternal Symbols" was held in Kyiv, featuring 54 icons from the workshop's collection. The exhibition included works created using various techniques, including original interpretations of the traditions of Ukrainian and international icon-painting schools. In 2014, the exhibition "Pokrov" (transl. The Protection of the Holy Virgin), dedicated to images of the Theotokos, was held at the Ivan Honchar Museum. The exhibition featured approximately 40 icons.

In 2016, the exhibition "Beginning" was held at the Ivan Honchar Museum. In the following years, the workshop continued its exhibition activities in Kyiv, other cities across Ukraine, and abroad. In 2019, the contemporary icon exhibition "Heaven on Earth" was held at the Oleksii Shovkunenko Kherson Regional Art Museum. The exhibition featured more than 100 icons created using various techniques.

== Techniques and materials ==
The 2022 icon "The Flagellation of Christ", created by the Heaven on Earth workshop, depicts Russian President Vladimir Putin and Patriarch Kirill of Moscow.

The workshop employs traditional icon painting techniques. The icons are painted on wooden panels, particularly those made of limewood, alder, and other types of wood. The panels are covered with pavoloka (a reinforcing cloth), followed by a layer of levkas, a special ground used in icon painting. The painting is executed primarily using the egg tempera technique. The artists prepare their paints by hand using natural pigments and minerals. Their works also incorporate gold leaf gilding and other decorative techniques.

A distinct area of Priest Sergii Pavelko's work involves the use of techniques associated with the art of jewelry making. In particular, some icons incorporate hot enamel, in which images are created on a copper plate that is fired at a high temperature. The workshop's portfolio specifies a firing temperature of approximately 850°C. The workshop's works combine egg tempera, gilding, hot enamel, copper plates, and other decorative techniques. Some icons are created on wooden panels incorporating copper plates and enamel.

== Artistic principles ==
The workshop's artistic philosophy combines traditional icon painting techniques with the exploration of new ways to represent sacred images. According to the workshop's portfolio, its core principle is "living creativity in God", while the canon is viewed not merely as a system of restrictions but as a foundation for discovering new artistic and spiritual solutions. This approach is reflected in the artists' engagement with various historical iconographic traditions, as well as in their creation of original interpretations of established iconographic types. For example, the 2011 exhibition "Light in the Darkness" featured an original interpretation of the iconographic image "Christ — the Angel of Great Counsel".

An important characteristic of the workshop's practice is that the authorship of individual icons is traditionally not emphasized. Materials accompanying the exhibition "Light in the Darkness" noted that the workshop's icon painters do not seek to associate specific works with the names of individual artists.

== Members ==
The founder and director of the workshop is Father Sergii Pavelko. Over the years, various icon painters have participated in the workshop's activities. Historical publications mention, among others, Natalia Sobolieva, Kseniia Hliebova, Olha Nesterova, Kostiantyn Samoilenko, Mariia Pavelko, and Kateryna Tsyrulik.

The workshop's current members include Father Sergii Pavelko, Natalia Sobolieva, and Kateryna Hryhorovych.

== Exhibition activities ==
Exhibition "The Protection of the Most Holy Theotokos", Kyiv, Ukraine, 2014

The workshop participates in exhibitions of contemporary sacred art in Ukraine and abroad. During the 2000s and 2010s, its exhibitions were held in cities including Mykolaiv, Kyiv, Lviv, Kherson, Poltava, Uzhhorod, Yaremche, Kolomyia, and Chernihiv, as well as Bratislava, Prague, and other cities. In 2011, the exhibition "Light in the Darkness" was held in Lviv at ICONART, a gallery of contemporary sacred art. The exhibition explored the theme of finding light in darkness and featured works that combined traditional iconography with original artistic interpretations.

In 2013, the exhibition "Eternal Symbols" in Kyiv presented 54 icons. That same year, the workshop's works were exhibited in other exhibition projects in Ukraine and abroad.

In 2014, the workshop participated in exhibition projects in Kyiv, Chernihiv, Kherson, and other cities across Ukraine. These included the exhibition "Pokrov" at the Ivan Honchar Museum.

The "Christ – The Angel of the Great Counsel" icon, 2025

In 2015, the workshop's exhibitions took place in Poltava, Kolomyia, and Kyiv. In 2016, exhibitions were held in Kyiv, Uzhhorod, and Yaremche. In 2017, the exhibition "Merciful Mother" was held at the Taras Shevchenko National University of Kyiv.

From 2018 to 2020, the workshop continued its exhibition activities in Kyiv, including at the Center for Ukrainian Culture and Arts and the Lesya Ukrainka Museum, as well as abroad. In 2019, the exhibition "The Power of Love" was held in Eisenstadt, Austria.

In 2020, the exhibition "Gold on Blue", or "Icons Born in Fire" was held in Lisnyky, Kyiv Oblast. In 2021, the exhibition "Christmas Angels" was presented in the same location. In 2022, the exhibition "Icons — A Hopeful Gaze into Heaven" was held in Perchtoldsdorf, Austria. In 2023, the exhibitions "Follow the Light" and a memorial evening marking the anniversary of the Russian invasion of Ukraine took place there.

The workshop has held more than 80 exhibitions in total.

== Selected exhibitions ==
Poster for the "May They All Be One" exhibition, Lviv, 2007

Father Sergii Pavelko gives an interview at the "PER ASPERA AD ASTRUM" exhibition, 2010

- 2005 – exhibition at the "Oleksandrivskyi" business center, Mykolaiv;
- 2006 – "Days of Saint Nicholas" group exhibition, Mykolaiv;
- 2007 – "May They All Be One", Andrey Sheptytsky National Museum of Lviv, Lviv;
- 2008 – workshop's personal exhibition, Ivan Honchar Museum, Kyiv;
- 2009 – "Future in Modernity", Ivan Honchar Museum, Kyiv; "Future in Modernity", Literary Museum, Odesa; "Merciful Mother", Lviv;
- 2010 – "PER ASPERA AD ASTRUM", Ivan Honchar Museum, Kyiv; "Children and the Icon", Ukrainian Catholic University, Lviv;
- 2011 – "Light in the Darkness", ICONART gallery, Lviv; "The Gospel — the Path to God", Ivan Honchar Museum, Kyiv; "Merciful Mother", National Cultural Center of Ukraine, Moscow; "Heaven on Earth", Bratislava;
- 2012 – "Encounter", Mykolaiv; "The Triumph of Orthodoxy", Kherson; "Vision", Bratislava; "Kinburn Under God's Protection", Pokrovka, Mykolaiv Oblast;
- 2013 – "Eternal Symbols", Kyiv; "Glory to God in the Highest", Kyiv and Prague; "God, Save Ukraine", Kyiv; "Light in the Darkness", Schliersee, Germany; "Red Easter", Mykolaiv;
- 2014 – "Pokrov", Ivan Honchar Museum, Kyiv; "Easter Joy", Chernihiv; "Summer God", Kherson; "The Bright Path", Kyiv;
- 2015 – "Come and See the Invisible", Poltava; "Let Every Breath Praise the Lord", Kolomyia; "Christ Is Born, Glorify Him!", Poltava; "The Light of the Son of God", Poltava; "Behold, I Am Making All Things New", Kyiv;
- 2016 – "Beginning", Ivan Honchar Museum, Kyiv; "Street Encounters", Uzhhorod; "The Road to the Light", Yaremche;
- 2017 – Merciful Mother, Kyiv;
- 2018 – "I Was in Prison...", Kyiv; "The Icon as Art", Kyiv;
- 2019 – "Face to Face with Miracles", Kyiv; "The Power of Love", Eisenstadt, Austria; "The Icon as Art", Kyiv; "Heaven on Earth", Kherson;
- 2020 – "Gold on Blue", or "Icons Born in Fire", Lisnyky, Kyiv Oblast;
- 2021 – "Christmas Angels", Lisnyky, Kyiv Oblast;
- 2022 – "Icons — A Hopeful Gaze into Heaven", Perchtoldsdorf, Austria;
- 2023 – "Follow the Light", Perchtoldsdorf, Austria;
- 2025 – "Mother of Humanity", H-Club, Lisnyky, Kyiv Oblast.

A chronology of exhibitions from 2005 to 2026 is also provided in the workshop's portfolio.

== Catalogues ==
The workshop has co-published, and contributed to catalogues of different exhibitional projects:

- 2007 – "May They All Be One", Lviv;
- 2009 – "Heaven on Earth", Kyiv;
- 2011 – "Heaven on Earth", Bratislava;
- 2012 – "Insight", Bratislava.

== Selected works and projects ==
One of the workshop's areas of activity is the creation of contemporary interpretations of traditional iconographic types. The works presented by the workshop include images of Jesus, the Virgin Mary, and saints, biblical and Gospel scenes, as well as works related to contemporary historical events. Among these is the icon "Weep Not for Me, O Mother", created in memory of those who died during the Revolution of Dignity. The work was executed on a wooden panel using pavoloka, levkas, egg tempera, and gilding.

In 2022, the workshop also created works related to the Russian-Ukrainian war. The workshop's portfolio includes, in particular, "Christ's Lament for Ukraine" and "The Flagellation of Christ".

== Gallery ==
"Jesus, Ineffable Love", an icon created by the "Heaven on Earth" workshop. The idea emerged spontaneously during prayer in the workshop while the Akathist was being read.

"Christ — Savior of the World", an icon from the workshop's cycle of thanksgiving icons. The image is dedicated to the salvation of humanity through Christ.

The twelve-panel icon "The Creed". Each panel illustrates a specific article of the Christian Creed through a corresponding Gospel or biblical scene.

The icon of the Theotokos "Seeking the Lost", 2012

The icon of the Theotokos "O All-Praised Mother", 2012

The icon "Drink from It, All of You", 2014

The icon "Holy Eucharist", depicting Saints John Chrysostom and Basil the Great standing before the Chalice, 2025

The diptych "The Annunciation", dedicated to the Gospel event of the Annunciation of the Virgin Mary.

"PER ASPERA AD ASTRUM" icons exhibition, 2010

Exhibition "Eternal Symbols", 5–25 June 2013, Center for Ukrainian Culture and Arts, Kyiv, Ukraine

Nina Matviienko at the exhibition "God, Save Ukraine", Taras Shevchenko National Museum, Kyiv, 2013

Icon exhibition "Licht in der Dunkelheit" (Light in the Darkness), Schliersee, Bavaria, Germany, 2013

Poster for the icon exhibition "The Protection of the Most Holy Theotokos", 14 October–3 November 2014

== Additional sources ==
- Галерея сучасного сакрального мистецтва ICONART. Виставка «Світло в пітьмі». (in Ukrainian)
- Музей Івана Гончара. «Початок». (in Ukrainian)
- Музей Івана Гончара. Виставка «Покров». (in Ukrainian)
- Центр української культури та мистецтва. «Вічні символи». (in Ukrainian)
- Херсонський обласний художній музей імені Олексія Шовкуненка. «Небо на землі». (in Ukrainian)
- «Небо у виставкових залах Національного музею». (in Ukrainian)
- 5 канал. «Миколаївські майстри створюють ікони за давніми технологіями». (in Ukrainian)
- Офіційний сайт іконописної майстерні «Небо на землі». (in Ukrainian)
