= Job Kondzelevych =

Job Kondzelevych (Ukrainian: Йов Кондзелевич, romanized: Yov Kondzelevych, c. 1667–between 1740 and 1748) was a painter from Zhovkva, whose works are considered to be among the best examples of Ukrainian religious art. Spending much of his career in Volhynia, Kondzelevych served as a hieromonk and hegumen of the Holy Cross Monastery in Lutsk.

== Biography ==
A native of Zhovkva, between 1698 and 1705 Kondzelevych took part in the creation of the iconostasis of Maniava Skete, which in 1785 was transferred to Bohorodchany, and in 1923 became part of the exposition of the National Museum in Lviv. Among other notable works by Kondzelevych are the iconostasis of Bilostok and Zahoriv monasteries in Volhynia. He died in Lutsk.

== Artistic style ==
Kondzelevych's works combine the traditions of Ukrainian icon painting with Western European artistic trends of the time. They are characterized by deep spirituality and demonstrate the high level of skill possessed by their creator. The icons created by Kondzelevych's school are known for their rich ornamentation and colour palette, artistic perfection and beautiful imagery. The individualized depiction of saints typical for Kondzelevych's icons demonstrates the influence of Baroque art on his painting.

== Works ==
Among notable icons created by Kondzelevych and members of his school are the images of Christ Pantocrator, Lamentation of Christ, Annunciation, Cosmas and Damian and Saint George.

== Gallery ==
=== Bohorodchany iconostasis (1698-1705) ===
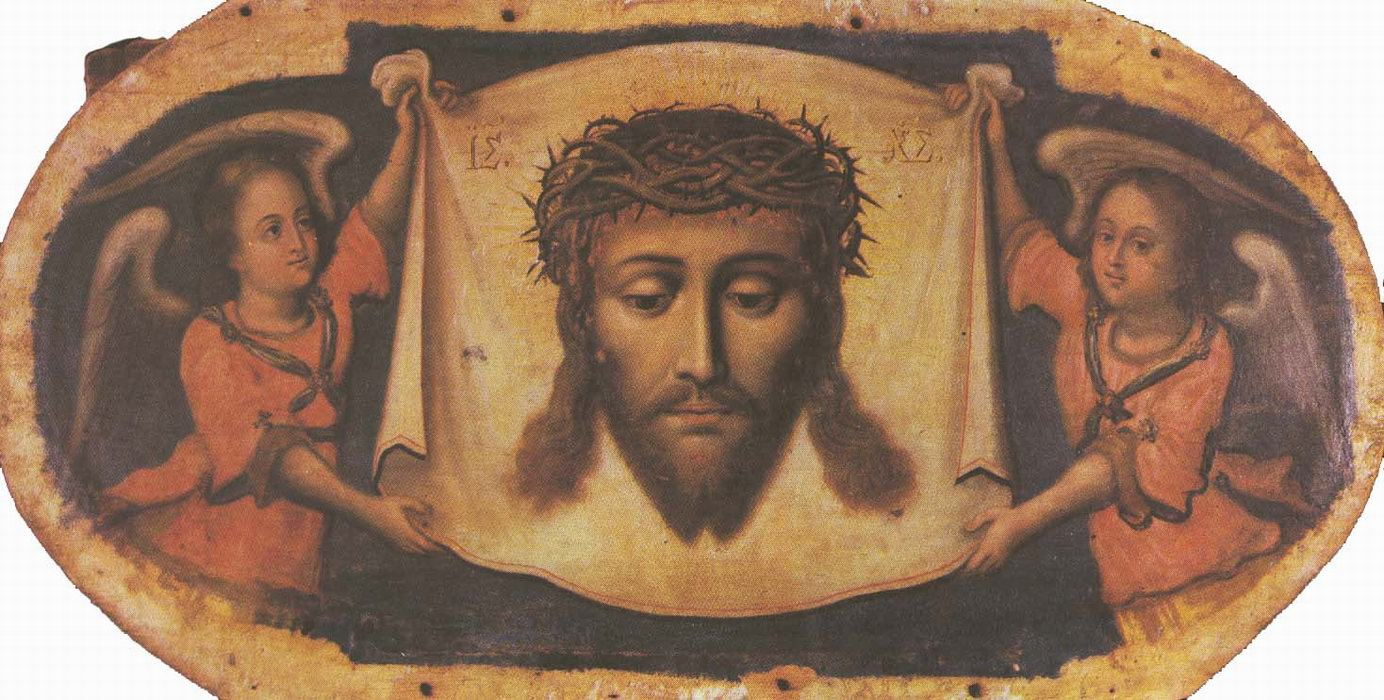
Jesus Christ

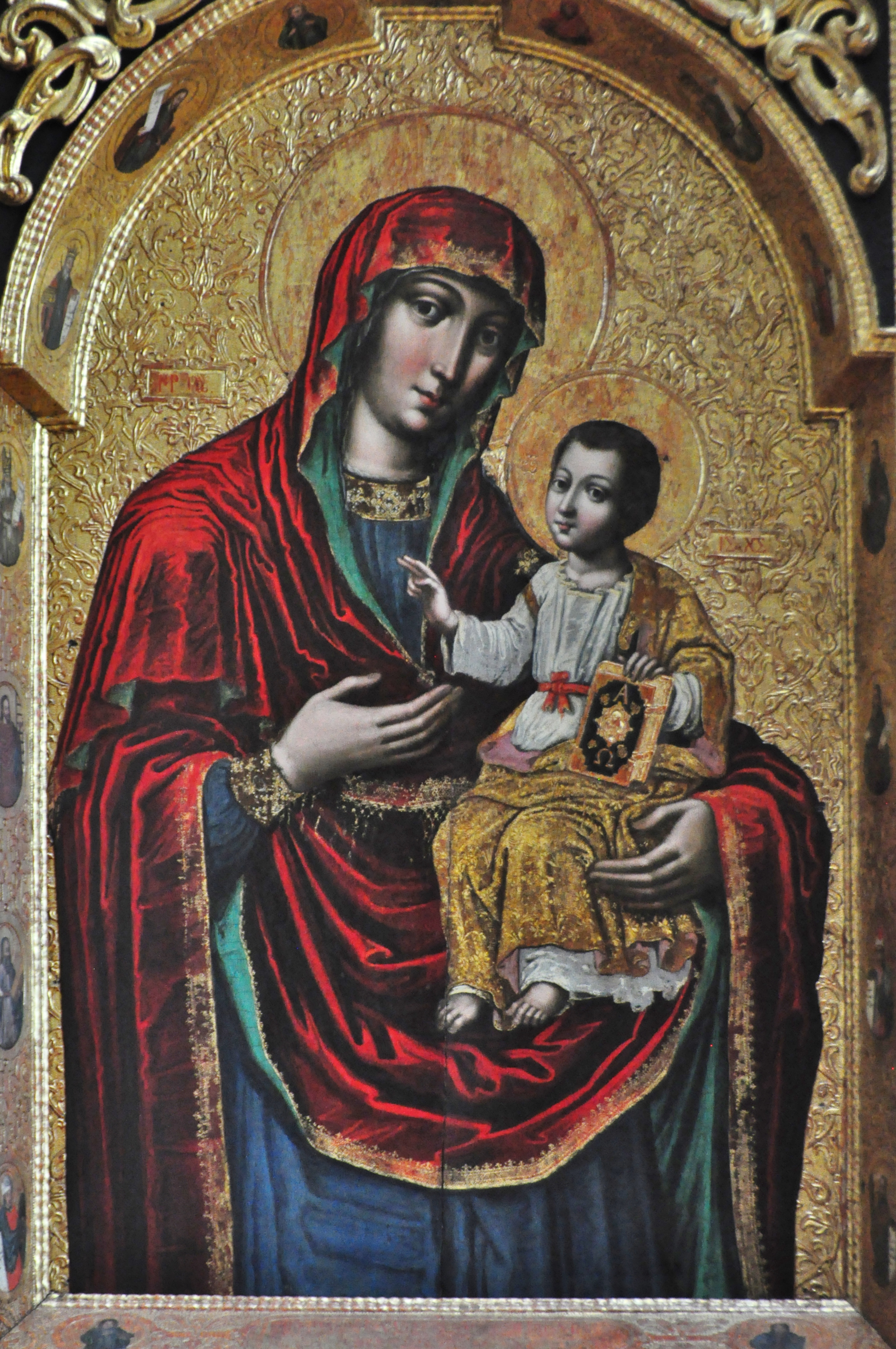
Virgin Mary

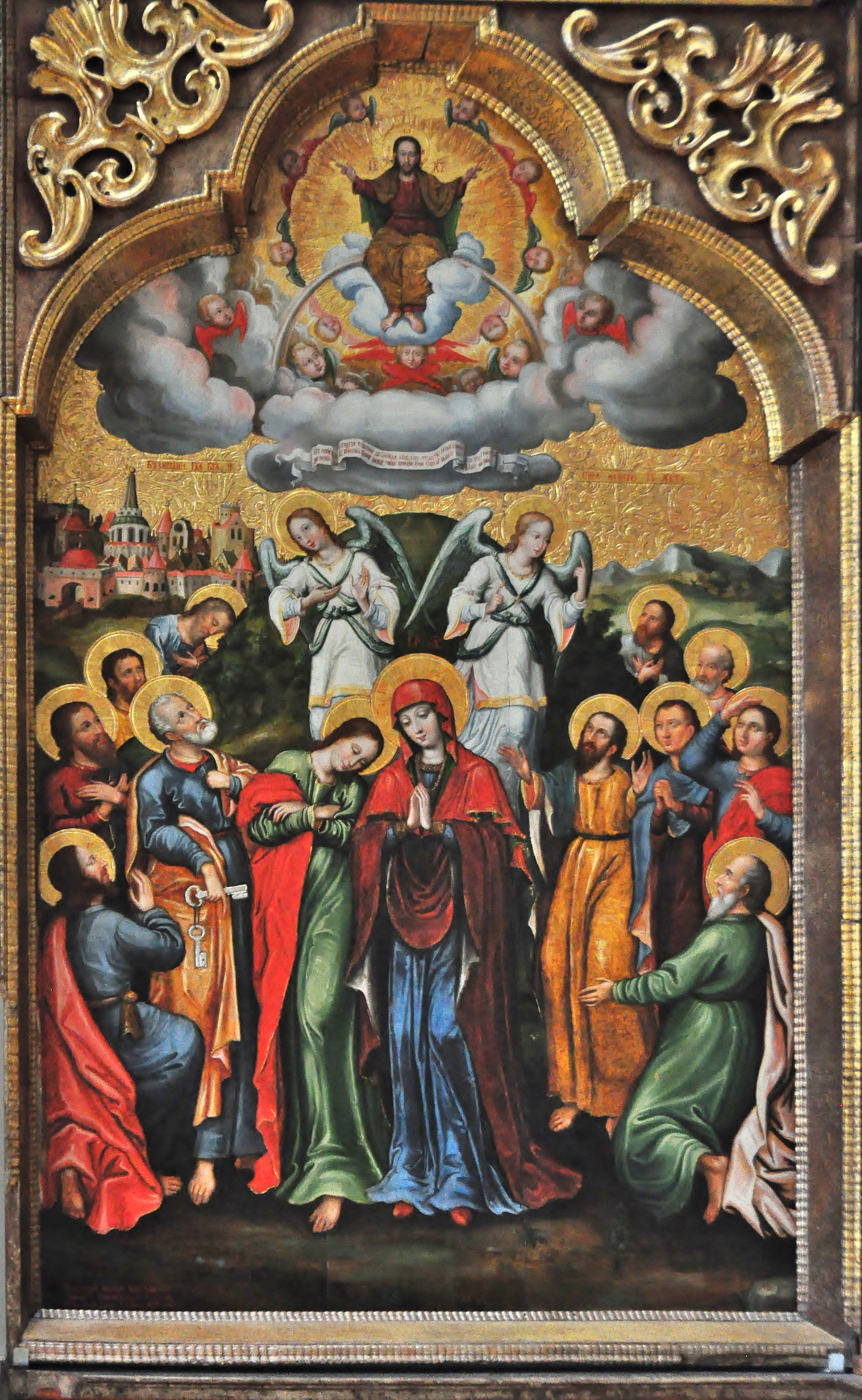
Our Lady of the Sign

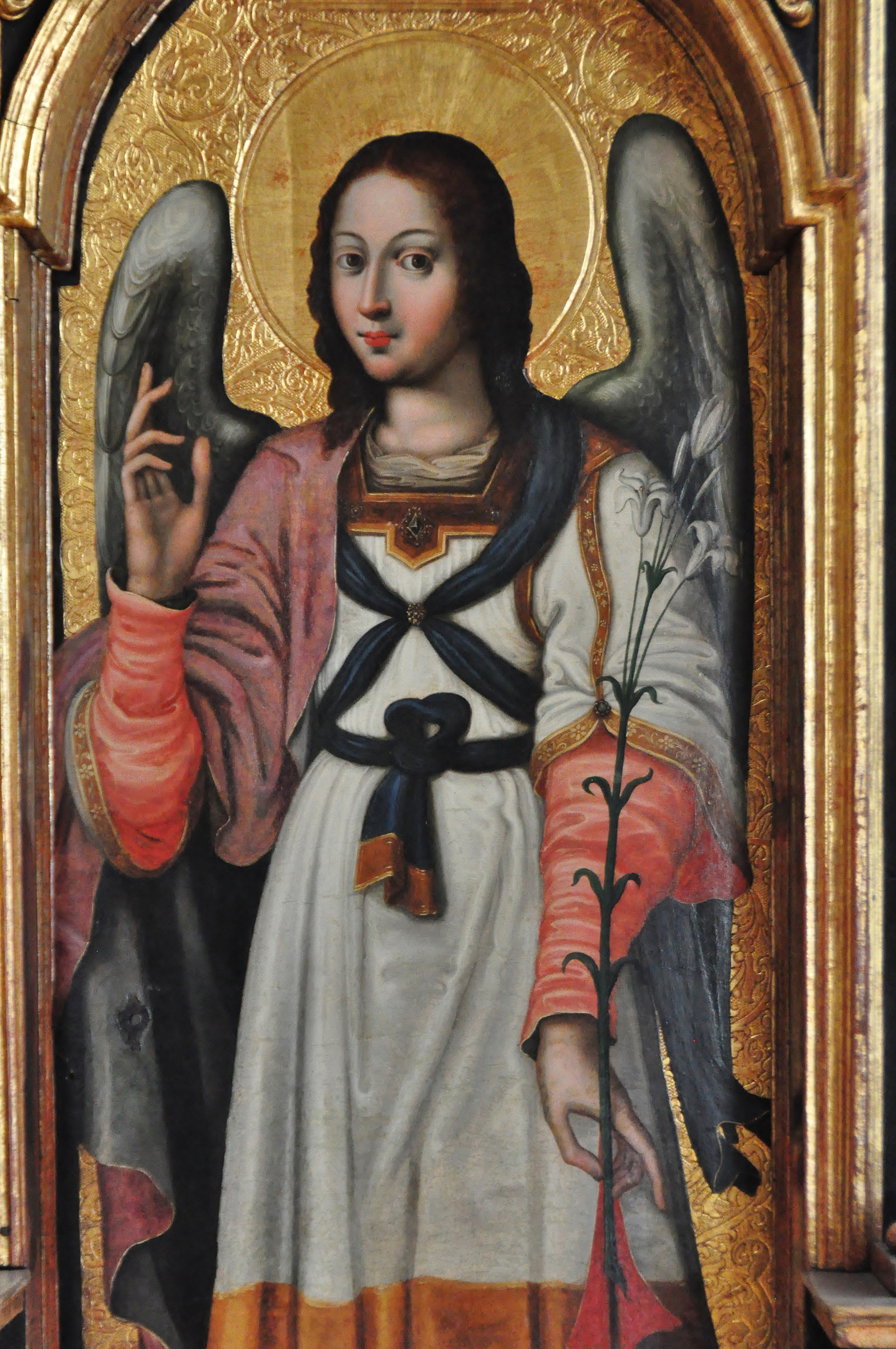
Archangel Gabriel

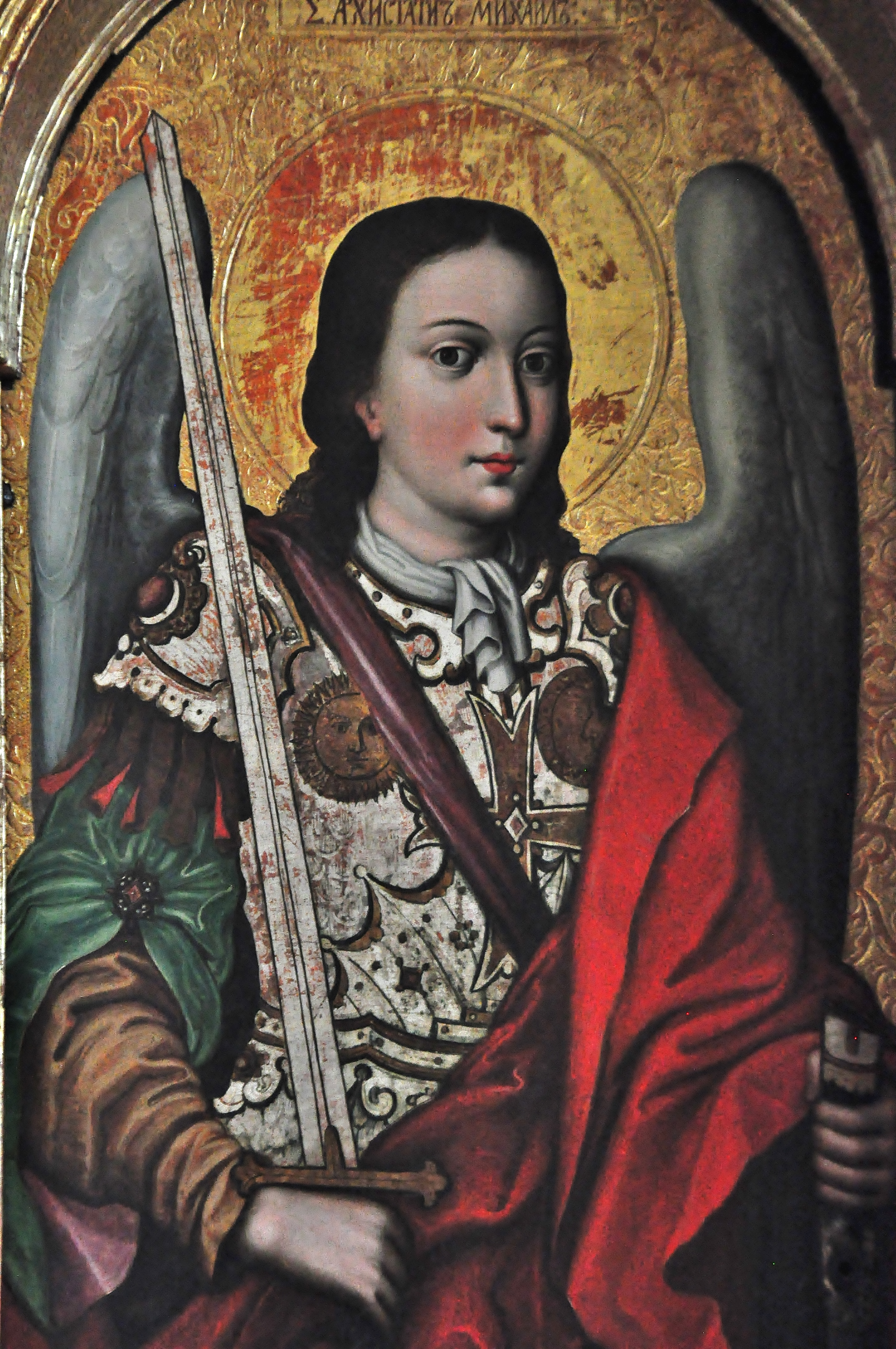
Archangel Michael

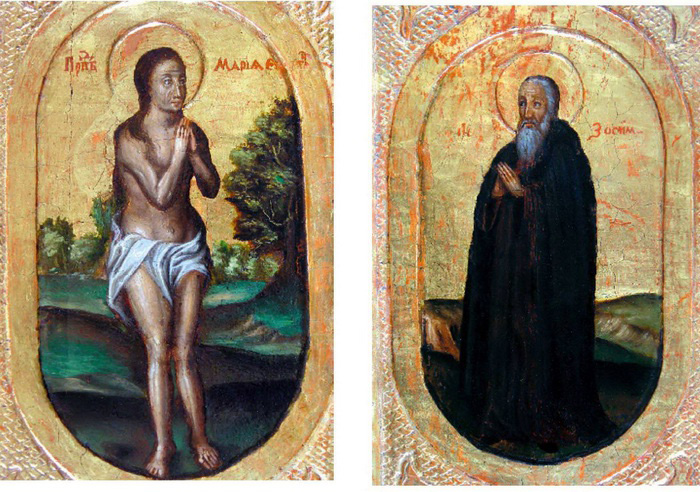
Mary of Egypt and Zosimas

=== Other works ===
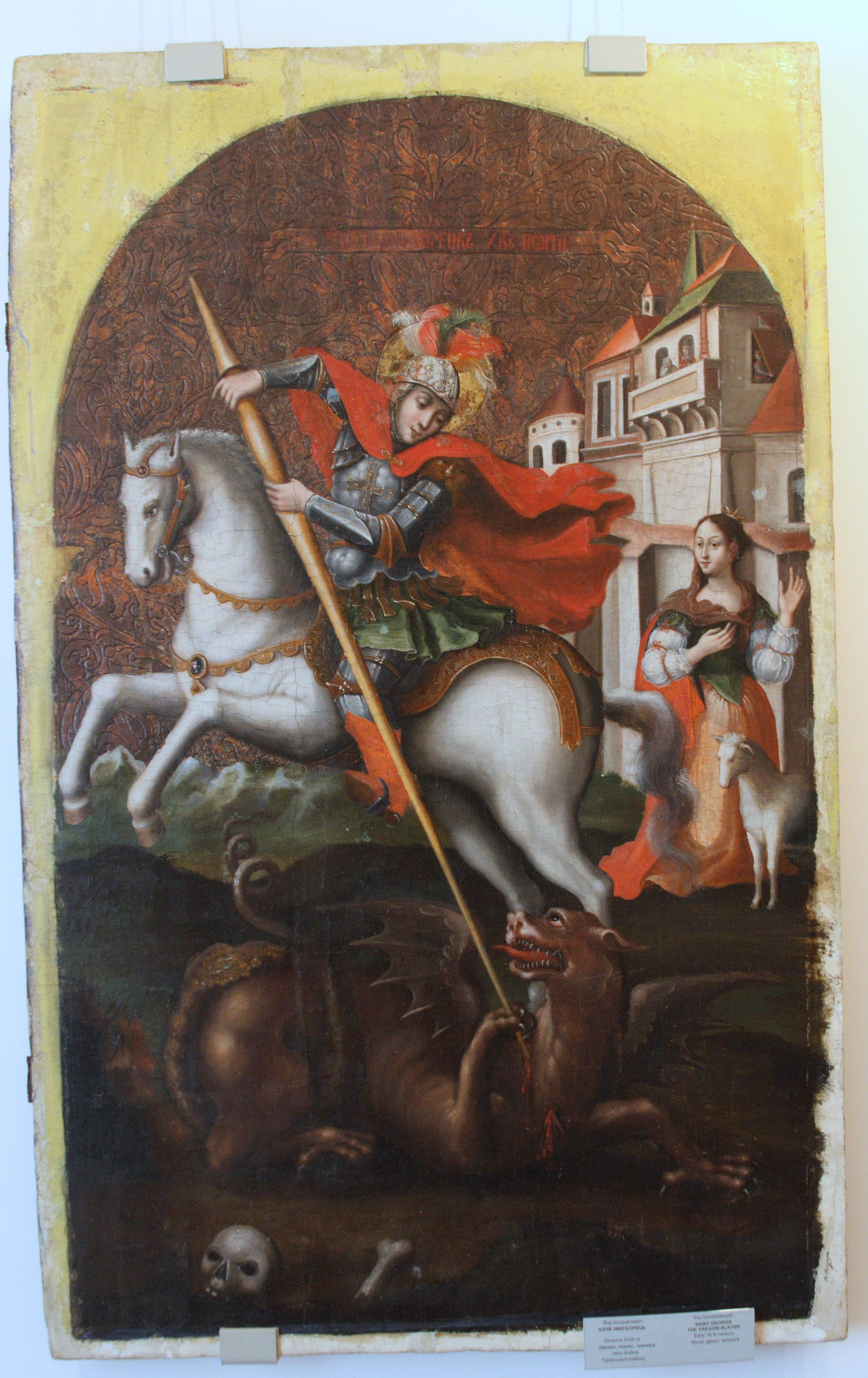
Saint George

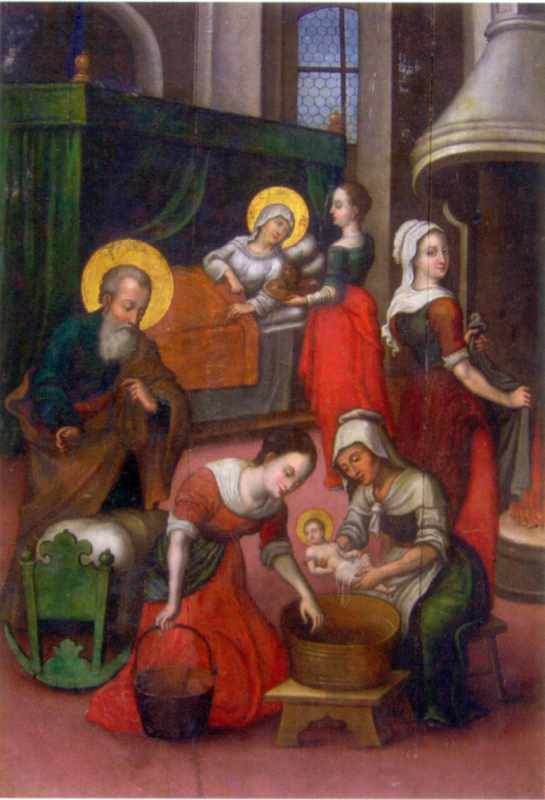
Nativity of the Virgin Mary, Zahoriv (1722)

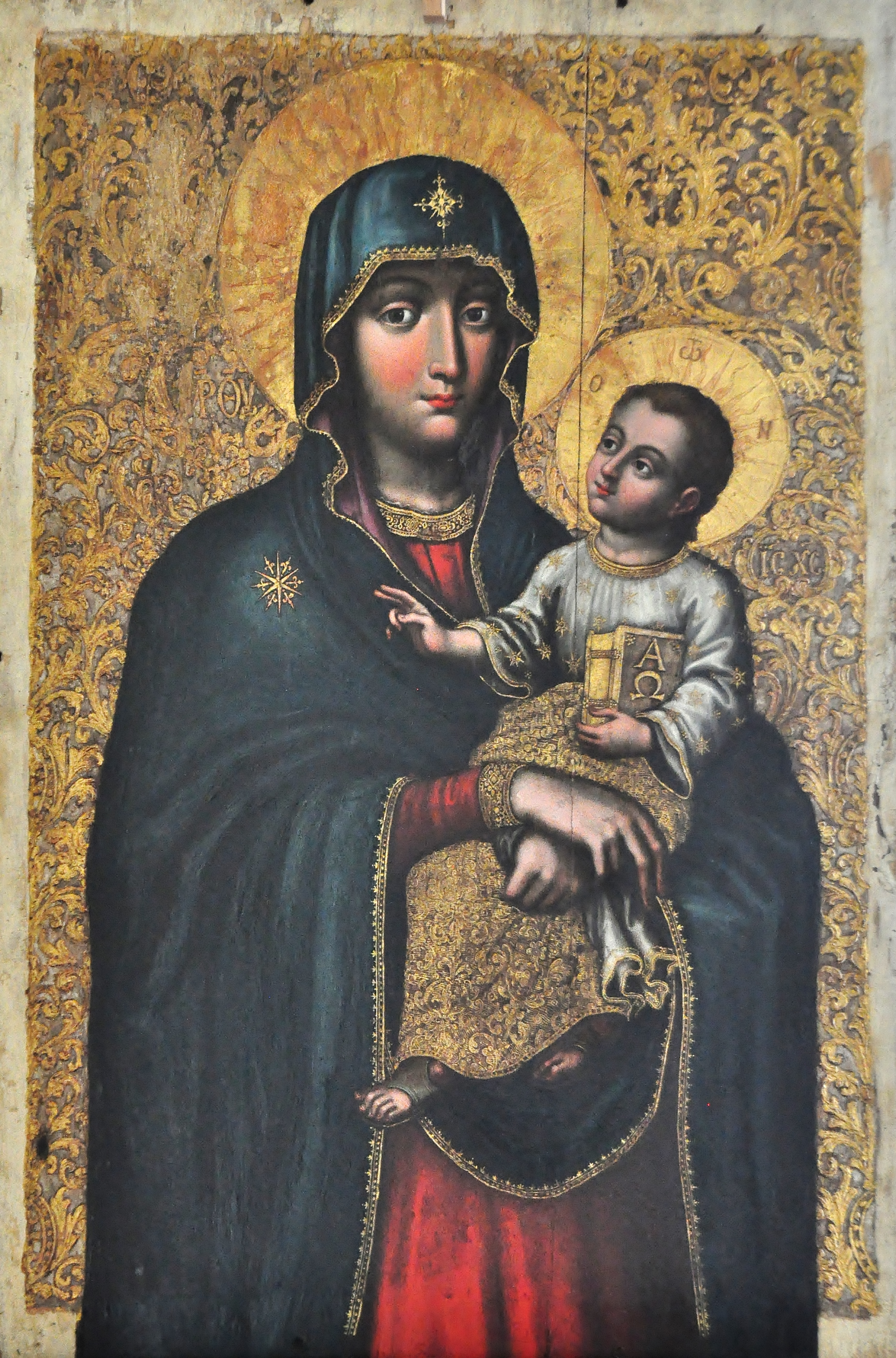
Virgin Mary with Child, Zahoriv (1722)

== See also ==
- Ukrainian Baroque
