= Lesya Ukrainka Museum =

Cultural museum in Yalta, Crimea

- Музей Лесі Українки
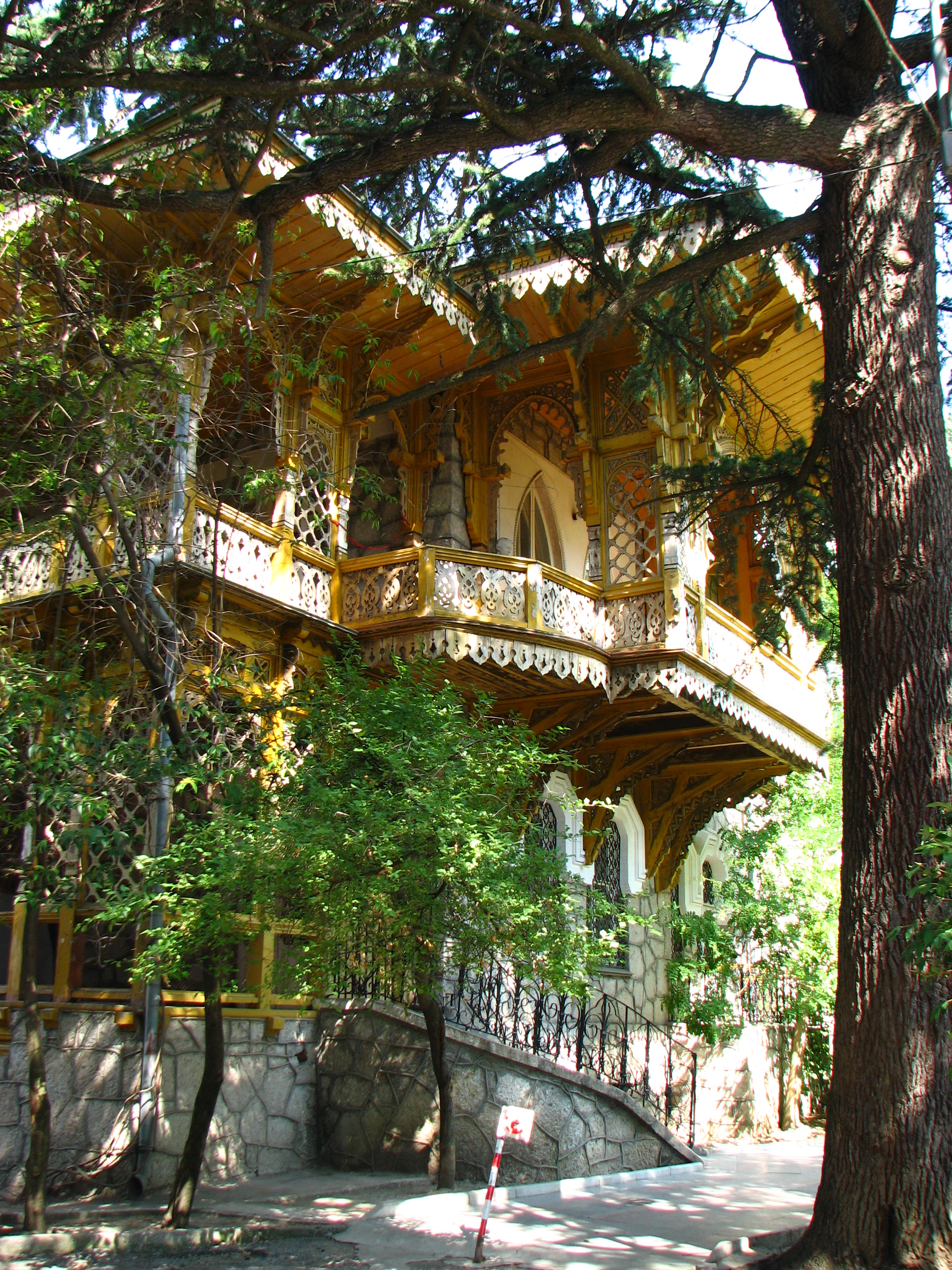
- Established: December 23, 1977
- Location: Kateryninska Street, 8, Yalta, Autonomous Republic of Crimea, Ukraine
- Coordinates: 44.4919°N 34.1619°E
- Type: Cultural
- Director: Oleksandra Visych
- Curator: Svetlana Kocherga
- Architect: Platon Terebenev (in 1884)
- Website: lesiaukrainka.crimea.ua

The Lesya Ukrainka Museum (Ukrainian: Музей Лесі Українки) in Yalta is a local history museum dedicated to one of Ukrainian literature's foremost writers, Lesya Ukrainka, who lived on the property for two years in her late twenties. In 1977, more than seventy years after her death, it became a museum dedicated to her memory, as well as a hub for Ukrainian culture and arts. Following the invasion of Crimea by the Russian Federation, its status as such is unknown.

== Building ==
The museum is located in the Lishchinsky dacha, which was constructed of native Crimean stone and is ornamented with extensive wooden gingerbread by the famous Yalta architect Platon Terebenev in 1884 and 1885 for Baron A. G. Jomini. Jomini later sold the building to a merchant named E.F. Lishchinsky.

Ukrainka liked the inexpensive apartment and its convenient location near the sea. She settled first in a ground-floor annex, and later the second floor of the house. The writer described her temporary apartment in the following letter to her mother:

"Today I wrote to Dad about my new home: still here, only living on the second floor. In the winter here, people do not live on the ground floor and rightly so, because here the gardens are green all winter causing the lower floors to be always in shadow, which is very good in summer but in winter spreads dampness. With the help of a small "trick of war" on my part, my hostess rented the apartment to me for 15 p., although I myself see that according to the local customs it is worth 20 p. It has two windows – one to the east, the second to the west - with double but unsecured sashes (if someone wants, they can pack here but, in my opinion, it is unnecessary), a bed with springs, a sofa, a large armchair (and don't tear it!), two tables, a wardrobe, a chest of drawers, a washbasin, "like at the station" and a screen. The door overlooks a large glass porch, half of which belongs to me and half to my neighbor, a rowdy lady with two children, Larissa (15 years) and Vitea (10 years)."

Interestingly, Ukrainka placed an advertisement in a local newspaper that read: "A reader who speaks 6 languages is looking for a something to do in the city." Afterward, two students did come to her to receive lessons at the Lischinskiy dacha and she developed an especially warm relationship with her student Leoni Razumov's family. She is also known to have replenished the city reading room with Ukrainian books. For example, she asked her mother to send a copy of Taras Shevchenko's "Kobzar" to Stakhanov, the librarian, "because people are asking for it a lot."

Crimea has been called the cradle of her creativity because so much of her work was inspired, set, or written on the temperate peninsula. It was here, in Yalta the year the above letter was penned, that Ukrainka met her great love Serhiy Merzhynsky whose death a few years later inspired her to write Oderdyma as she watched over his passing.

== Creation of the museum ==
The animus to create a museum dedicated to the memory of Lesya Ukrainka in Yalta arose on the eve of the 100th anniversary of the poet's birth. The group that coalesced around this idea was composed of Yalta intellectuals, local historians and artists, as well as Kyivan fans of Ukrainka's work led by Yevhen Pronyuk. Included as well were Oleksei Nirko, Alexander Janusz, Ostap Kindrachuk, Cymbal Tatiana Ivanovna, who were supporters of the poet's work, and Mykola Ohrimenko, one of her students.

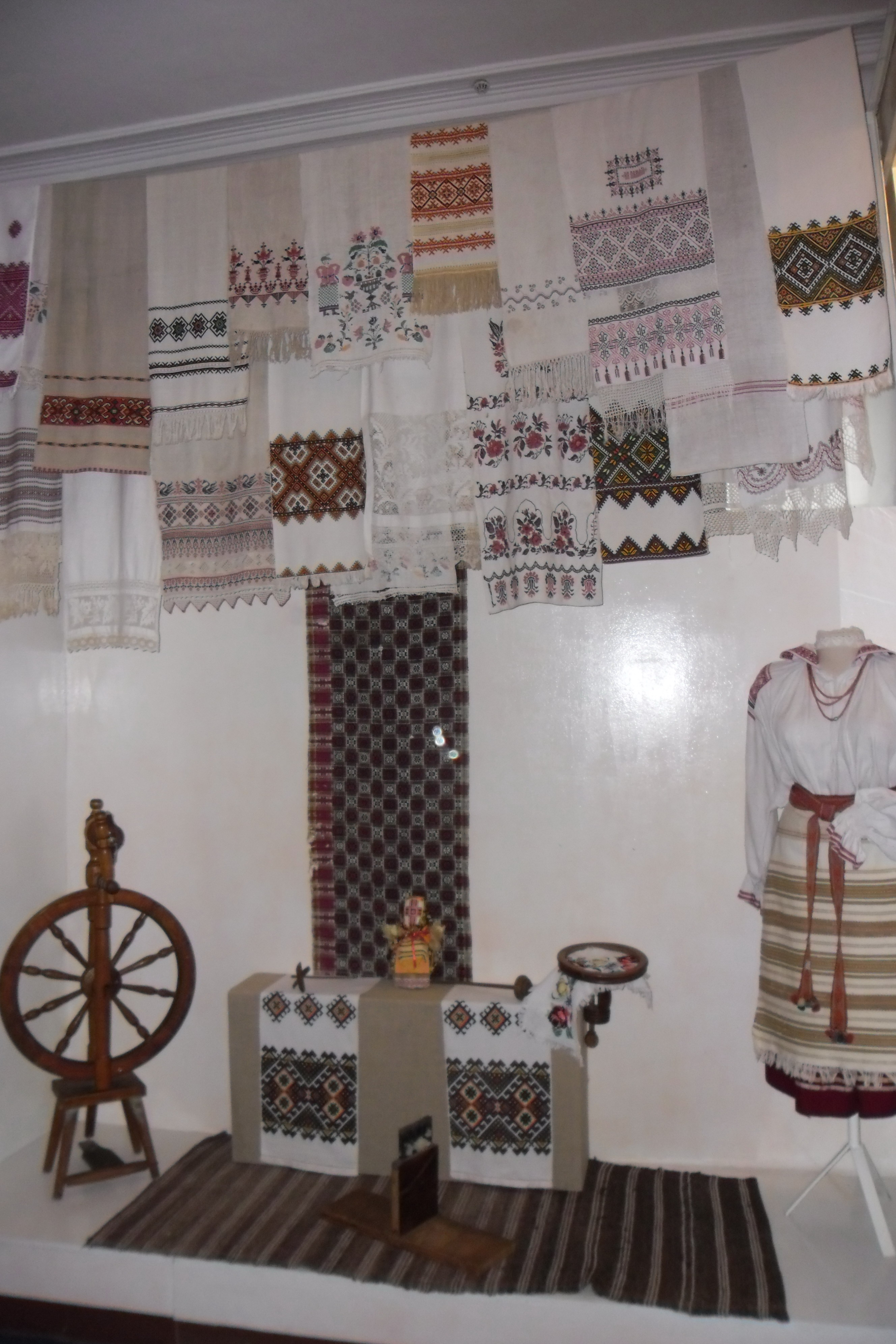
Ukrainka was known to embroider Rushnyki like these when too sick to write.

This group's progress toward a museum produced a memorial to Lesya Ukrainka in Balaklava, Crimea, created by sculptor Halina Kalchenko and architect Anatoly Ignashchenko, as well as a memorial plaque at the Lishchinsky dacha and a growing collection of exhibits. Eventually, the museum's collection would include first editions of Ukrainka's works, family heirlooms, photos of her friends and relatives, drawings from the late 19th and early 20th centuries and Ukrainian national clothing. Since the invasion of Crimea, the fate of these items is unknown.

Leonid Brezhnev's 1970's purge of nationalist intellectuals halted progress toward a museum, but the project revived under Mikhail Gorbachev in 1988 when the Museum of Pre-Revolutionary Progressive Russian and Ukrainian Culture vacated the dacha and the Yalta Museum of Local History opened an exhibit there featuring Lesya Ukrainka. The house was completely restored in 1990.

In 1991, a long-term exhibit, "Lesya Ukrainka and Crimea," opened in the building to commemorate her 120th birthday. On September 10, 1993, official resistance to the museum gave way before pressure from the Yalta city chapter of the all-Ukrainian society Enlightenment named after Taras Shevchenko, a branch of the Ukrainian Women's Union, and high-minded members of the public. That day the Yalta City Council decided to transform the exhibit into the Lesya Ukrainka Museum, a literary museum overseen by a department of the Yalta State Historical Museum.

In 2001, the tenth anniversary of Ukraine's independence, the museum's collection was extensively renovated with assistance by the International Renaissance Foundation to celebrate Ukrainka's 130th birthday. Thanks to this, a new exhibition named Ломикамінь ("Lomykamin" or Saxifrage) opened and ran until 2014. This was a name Ukrainka herself chose when she saw mountain edelweiss and in her lifetime she was called the "Lomykamin of Ukrainian culture and literature." The exhibit's basic concept was to illustrate Ukrainka's creative versatility and resilience. The lobby acquainted visitors with her historical and cultural context. Following that, three halls in different styles awaited them: a living room in the style of a Yalta resort of the 19th century, a living room in the style of a traditional Ukrainian house which discussed Ukrainka's work as well as other writers of the 19th and 20th centuries who were somehow connected to Crimea, and the antique hall which represented the spirit of ancient taurida which Ukrainka felt so vividly and wove into the texts she worked on in Crimea.

== Before the occupation of Crimea ==
In the pure exhilaration of the first years of Ukraine's independence, museum workers and public figures organized a Sunday school of Ukrainian studies. The teachers were volunteers, residents of Yalta, most of whom rallied together in the Ukrainian Creative Intellect Club of Yalta. Svetlana Kocherga, head of the museum, became curator of the school, and among the most distinguished teachers were: Viktor Vinogradov, linguist, philologist and member of the National Writers' Union of Ukraine; Nadiya Petrenko, recipient of the Honored Artist of Ukraine award; Mykola Vakulenko, recipient of the Honored Master of Folk Art distinction; Ostap Kindrachuk, bandurist, local historian and bibliophile; and Father Mykola, priest of the Greek Catholic Church. Among the subjects taught were ethics of the Christian faith, Ukrainian language, Ukrainian literature, Ukrainian history, music and fine arts. The most important consequences of the school's existence were the creation of the first Ukrainian class in Specialized school No.4 in 1994, and many years of cooperation with the only Ukrainian school in Yalta.

The museum has always relied on work with higher educational institutions, including the Tavria National University, the Crimean Engineering and Pedagogical University, but above all the Crimean University for the Humanities in Yalta. The many joint projects included scientific conferences and seminars on museums and the folklore practices on which this one had been based. It was the students who organized the popular amateur theater "Seven Muses". The theater presented nearly a dozen performances, experimenting with genres, and managed to win the "Dakh" student theater competition in Kyiv. "Seven Muses" offered a new reading of Lesya Ukrainka's works. The most original was the production of "The Stone Master", which took place under the open sky on the steps of the museum with the chic musical accompaniment of the "Magic Singing" ensemble, which performed medieval chants.

Activists of the "Enlightenment" society, the Ukrainian Women's Union, and "Crimean Corner" (a chapter of the Ukrainian Creative Intellect Club of Yalta) constantly gathered in the museum. A library called Ukrainian Book operated successfully there and was furnished with rare publications thanks to active communication with cultural centers of the American diaspora.

The museum had an active exhibition schedule: in addition to its own thematic exhibitions, for many years it implemented the project "Visit Literary Museums in Yalta," with exhibitions dedicated to Olga Kobylyanska, Mykhailo Kotsiubinsky, and writers of the 20s and 30s, etc. Since 2005, there was an exhibition of banduras from Crimea and the Kuban, the brainchild of the founders of the Lesya Ukrainka museum, Oleksiy Fedorovych Nyrko, who did not live to see it come to fruition.

Lesya Ukrainka Museum in Yalta was one of the first in Ukraine to take part in the International Night at the Museum event. For fifteen years the high point of the museum's calendar was the annual cultural and artistic festival, "Autumn Forest," directed by Vasyl Vovkun. The spectrum of the program has always been extremely wide — from old folk stories through the classics to the avant-garde. Thanks to this festival, Yalta saw the performances of Nina Matvienko and the theater of modern choreography "Constellation Aniko", the large-scale production "Peer Gynt" by the Donetsk Opera and Ballet Theater, performances of the Lviv "Theatre in the basket", paintings by Maria Pryimachenko and the surrealists of the 21st century, and much more.

On October 21, 2010, the Verkhovna Rada of Ukraine recommended that the Cabinet of Ministers of Ukraine take measures by February 1, 2011, to ensure the repair of the Lesya Ukrainka Museum in Yalta, but by the time of the invasion of Crimea this had not been done.

== After the invasion of Crimea ==
After the invasion and occupation of Crimea by the Russian Federation the second floor of the building, where the museum was located, was closed for repairs. When it reopened, it had been transformed into a section of the Historical and Literary Museum of Yalta telling a more Russian literary, musical, artistic and philistine story of the city during the 19th century. The museum focuses on Russian culture in Crimea and on artists such as Leo Tolstoy or Fedor Chaliapin while also including a reference Ukrainka as well. It does not mention its prior function as a center for and museum of Ukrainian culture at all.
