= Taras Lozynskyi =

Ukrainian painter, icon painter, collector (1959–2023)

- Тарас Володимирович Лозинський
- Born: 28 March 1959; Lviv
- Died: 8 March 2023 (aged 63); Lviv
- Education: Ivan Fedorov Ukrainian Polygraphic Institute
- Occupations: Painter, icon painter, collector, curator of art publications

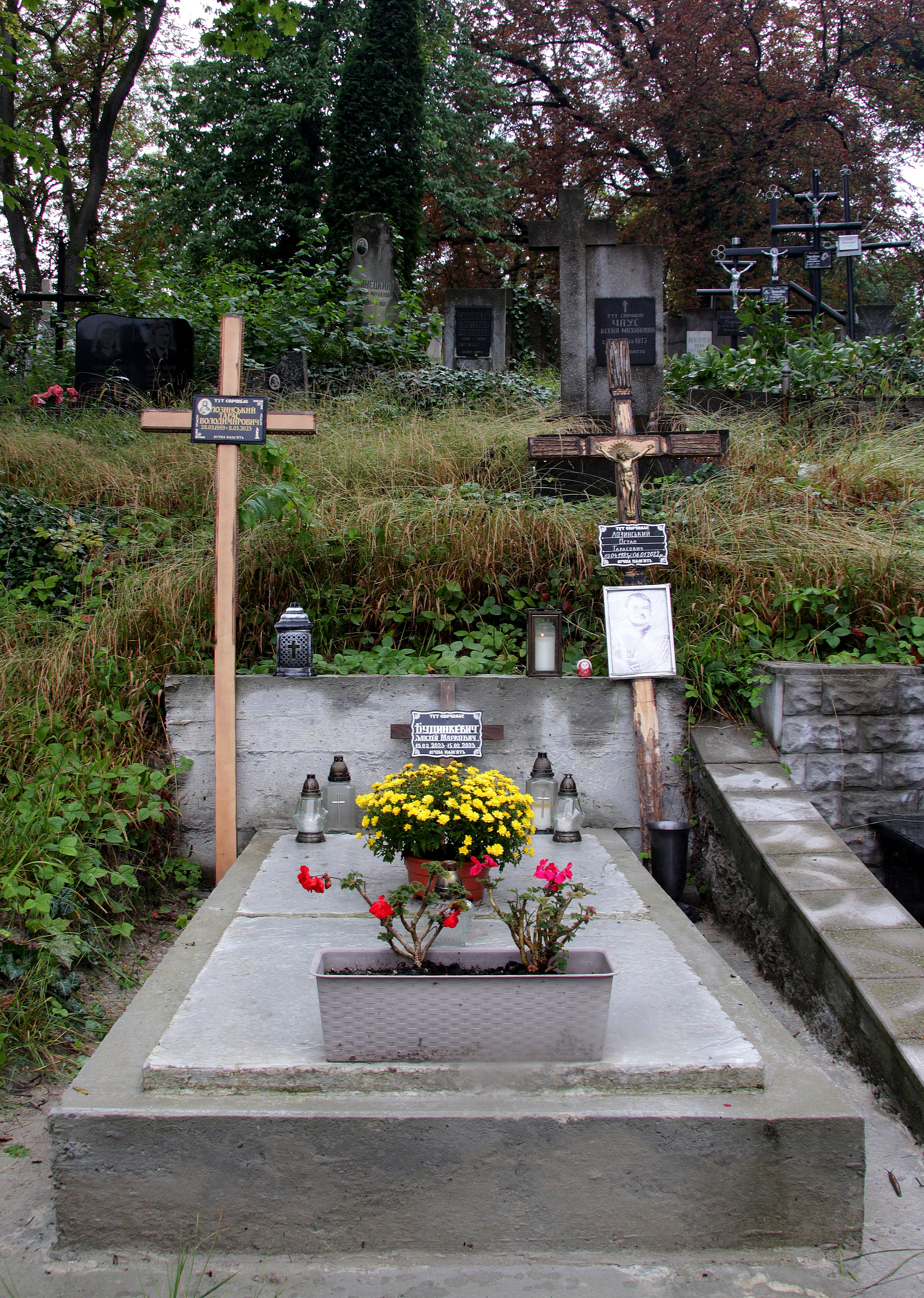
The grave of Taras Lozynskyi and his son Ostap on field 75 of the Lychakiv Cemetery.

Taras Lozynskyi (Ukrainian: Тарас Володимирович Лозинський; 28 March 1959 – 8 March 2023) was a Ukrainian painter, icon painter, collector, curator of art publications, co-founder and deputy director (2003) of the Lviv Institute for the Collection of Ukrainian Art Monuments at the Shevchenko Scientific Society. Member of the Shevchenko Scientific Society. Father of the artist and icon painter Ostap Lozynskyi.

== Biography ==
He was born on 28 March 1959 in Lviv.

In 1981, he graduated from the Economics Department of the Ivan Fedorov Ukrainian Polygraphic Institute (now the Ukrainian Academy of Printing).

In 1987–2001 he worked as a restorer in the studio of Nina Prysiazhna. He taught at the Iconography School of the Ukrainian Catholic University.

He was a member of the Supervisory Board of the Lviv National Academy of Arts.

He died in Lviv on 8 March 2023, 20 days short of his 64th birthday. He was buried in the same grave as his son on field 75 of the Lychakiv Cemetery.

== Works ==
Under the influence of the painting experience of Oleksa Novakivskyi, Roman Selskyi, and Volodymyr Patyk, he formed as an artist with his own author's style.

From 1989 he was engaged in icon painting on glass, the author of 800 works. Personal exhibition in Lviv (2013, 2019, 2024, posthumously).

- author of the book "Isus" (2003, together with Ihor Kalynets).
- compiler of a number of albums and catalogs of Ukrainian art – "Ivan Hrechko" (2006), "Mykhailo Boichuk" (2010), "Anatol Petrytskyi" (2012), "Ukrainske mystetstvo XV–ХХ st." (Vol. 1 – 2007, Vol. 2 – 2008);
- is one of the initiators of the series "Ukrainian Folk Art" – "Zhinocha sorochka Borshchivsko-Zastavnivskoho Prydnistrovia" (2013), "Rushnyky Naddniprianskoi Ukrainy" (2017), "Bukovynski zhinochi sorochky" (2018), "Ukrainske narodne mystetstvo" (2021).

He collected a large collection of folk art.
