= Eremenko =

Yeremenko (Ukrainian: Єременко), Yeryomenko/Eremenko (Russian: Ерёменко) or Jaromienka (Belarusian: Яроменка) is a surname of Ukrainian-language origin. It is common in Ukraine, Belarus, and Russia. Notable people with the surname include:

- Alexei Eremenko (disambiguation), multiple individuals
- Alexander Eremenko (disambiguation), multiple individuals
- Andrey Yeryomenko (1892–1970), Soviet military commander, Marshal of the Soviet Union
- Dmitry Yeryomenko (born 1980), Kazakhstani skier
- Igor Eremenko (born 1997), Russian ice dancer who defected to the United States
- Ilya Yeryomenko (born 1998), Russian footballer
- Kateryna Yeremenko (born 1993), Ukrainian singer and composer
- Konstantin Yeryomenko (1970–2010), Russian futsal player
- Paul Eremenko (born 1979), American innovator and technology executive
- Dmytro Yeremenko (born 1990), Ukrainian footballer
- Nikolai Yeremenko (disambiguation), multiple individuals
- Roman Eremenko (born 1987), Finnish footballer
- Ruslan Yeremenko (born 1978), Ukrainian pole vaulter
- Sergei Eremenko (born 1999), Finnish footballer
- Svitlana Yeremenko (born 1959), Ukrainian journalist
- Vasili Eremenko (born 1973), Ukrainian figure skater
- Vera Yeremenko (born 1983), Kazakhstani alpine skier
- Victor Valentine Eremenko, American physicist
- Vladislav Yeryomenko (born 1999), Belarusian ice hockey player
- Yaroslav Yeremenko (born 1989), Ukrainian DJ
