= Hanna-Oksana Lypa =

Ukrainian decorative and applied arts artist (born 1958)

- Ганна-Оксана Ярославівна Липа
- Born: 18 July 1958 (age 68); Verkhnii Luzhok (now Lviv Oblast, Ukraine)
- Education: Lviv Institute of Applied and Decorative Arts
- Occupations: Decorative and applied arts artist
- Awards: Merited Painter of Ukraine

Hanna-Oksana Lypa (Ukrainian: Ганна-Оксана Ярославівна Липа; born 18 July 1958) is a Ukrainian decorative and applied arts artist. Merited Painter of Ukraine (2012). Member of the National Union of Artists of Ukraine (1990).

== Biography ==
Hanna-Oksana Lypa was born on 18 July 1958, in Verkhnii Luzhok in the Lviv Oblast.

In 1982, she graduated from the Lviv Institute of Applied and Decorative Arts (specialty teachers Mykhailo Hladkyi, Dmytro Krvavych, Ivan Tomchuk, Ivan Frank). Since then, she has worked in Lviv, including as a design artist at the Institute of Materials from 1982–1989, and at the Experimental Ceramic and Sculptural Factory from 1984–2007. From 2002–2005, she headed the ceramics section of the Lviv organization of the National Union of Artists of Ukraine.

== Creativity ==
From 1986, she has been exhibiting her works at all-Ukrainian and international exhibitions and plein airs. Solo exhibitions have been held in Lviv (1989–1990, 1998, 2001, 2004, 2007–2009, 2013, 2018), Kraków (1996), and Kyiv (2001–2002, 2012–2013, 2015).

In her works, the artist deeply reflects on the meaning of life, drawing inspiration from ancient sources and world cultural heritage. She often imbues her creations with majestic forms and reinterprets symbols and images, combining them with various art forms.

The artist's oeuvre includes decorative plates, reliefs, plaques, vases, tea and coffee sets (over 100 different types of products launched into mass production), jugs, planters, monumental decorative panels that clearly reflect national traditions in their forms and patterns, and garden and park compositions, for which stoneware, porcelain, faience, pottery clay, and chamotte are used; also batiks, installations, and painted compositions. She decorates both interiors and exteriors. Individual works are preserved in the collections of the National Museum-Preserve of Ukrainian Pottery in Opishnia, the Borys Voznytsky Lviv National Art Gallery, and the Institute of Banking, the Museum of Ceramics (Bolesławiec, Poland); and in private collections in Ukraine, Germany, the USA, Austria, Azerbaijan, Poland, and Turkey.

Among important works:

- Painting: "Syrena. Nich" (1979), "Peredchuttia poliotu" (1981), "Leda", "Velyka rozpustnytsia" (both 1994), "Kliuchivski vesilni" (2011), "Svitoh" (2012), triptych "Danaia" (2013);
- Painting Cycles: "Berehynia" (1995–1996), "Dukhy zabutykh predkiv" (2013), "Maidan" (2014);
- Batiks: "Narodzhennia kvitky" (1985), "Narodnyi motyv" , "Zvizda (Maty)", "Derevo zhyttia" (all 1986), "Narodzhennia pisni", "Narodzhennia shchastia", "Zhinochyi portret iz syrenoiu" (all 1987), "More", "Materynstvo" (both 1989), "Sontse", "Holhofa", "Muza", "Dovhe chekannia v zhurbi" (all 1990);
- Ceramic Cycles: "Ave Maria" (1987–1988), "Muza. Prysviata Ukrayini", "Transformatsiia svitla" (both 1988–1989), "Holhofa. Prysviata vsim represovanym" (1990), "Erotychna transformatsiia" (1990–1993), "Matriarkhat" (1990–1994), "Rozmova" (1994–1996), "Berehynya" (1994–1998), "Kaleidoskop" (1995–1997), "Ikona-khrest" (1996), "Lovy nevydymoho zvira. Transmutatsii" (1998–2002), "U poshukakh zolotoyi rybky" (1998–2004), "Hermeneutike. Mova i prostir" (2002–2006), "Poly + sema" (2004–2008), "Kruhoverť", "Vytoky", "Kliuch-oberih" (all 2006), "Pramatrytsi" (2010);
- Graphic Cycles: "Muza" (1990–1991), "Svyashchenna zemlia" (2007–2008, 2013), "Danaia" (2013).

== Awards ==
- Merited Painter of Ukraine (6 March 2012)
- Zenovii Flinta Prize (2008)

== Bibliography ==
- Lypa Hanna-Oksana Yaroslavivna / O. V. Holubets, R. M. Yatsiv // Encyclopedia of Modern Ukraine [Online] / Eds. : I. М. Dziuba, A. I. Zhukovsky, M. H. Zhelezniak [et al.] ; National Academy of Sciences of Ukraine, Shevchenko Scientific Society. – Kyiv : The NASU institute of Encyclopedic Research, 2016.
- Ганна-Оксана Липа: Каталог виставки. Л., 1990.
- Голубець О. «Жертовник» Ганни-Оксани Липи // Артанія. 1998. № 4.
- Онищенко В. Знайомтесь: Оксана Липа // Український керамологічний журнал. 2002. № 2.
- Ворс І. Полив'яна еротика // Політика і культура. 2002, 23–29 квіт.
- Липа Ганна-Оксана. Художня кераміка, живопис, графіка, інсталяція, фотографіка: Каталог. Л., 2010.
