= Hanna Drul =

Ukrainian decorative ceramics artist (1960–2026)

- Ганна Друль
- Born: 22 September 1960; Chervonohrad, Lviv Oblast, Ukrainian SSR, USSR
- Died: 23 July 2026 (aged 65); Lviv, Ukraine
- Education: Lviv Ivan Trush School of Applied Arts, Lviv Institute of Applied and Decorative Arts
- Occupation: Decorative ceramics artist

Hanna Yosypivna Drul (Ukrainian: Ганна Йосипівна Друль; 22 September 1960 – 23 July 2026) was a Ukrainian decorative ceramics artist. Member of the National Union of Artists of Ukraine (1993), International Academy of Ceramics (2019).

== Life and career ==
Hanna Drul was born on 22 September 1960, in Chervonohrad (now Sheptytskyi) in the Lviv Oblast.

In 1979, she graduated from the Lviv Ivan Trush School of Applied Arts, and in 1984, from the Lviv Institute of Applied and Decorative Arts (specialty teachers Karlo Zvirynsky, Petro Markovych, Emmanuil Mysko). From 1987, she worked at the Lviv Experimental Ceramic and Sculptural Factory. From 1998 to 2001, she headed the ceramics section of the Lviv organization of the National Union of Artists of Ukraine. Later, she was engaged in creative work.

From 1987, she presented her works at all-Ukrainian and international exhibitions. She held solo exhibitions in Lviv (1989, 2000, 2006, 2013, 2015 (together with Iryna Marko), 2020, 2022), Kraków (1996, 2003–2004), Chernivtsi (2014), and Odesa (2016). Her work includes decorative compositions, reliefs, and sculptures. Individual works are preserved in the collections of the National Museum-Preserve of Ukrainian Pottery in Opishnia, the Museum of Ceramics in Bolesławiec (Poland), museums in Munich (Germany), Kraków, Wrocław (Poland), Toronto (Canada), and private collections.

Drul died from cancer on 23 July 2026, at the age of 65.

== Notable works ==
- Decorative compositions: "Natovp" (1987), "Kraina durniv" , "Dialoh" (both 1990), "Cholovichy zabavy", "Zhadoba zhertvy", "Spadkoyemets", "Halytski zhinky" (all 1998), "Khto dvanadtsiatyi?" (1999), "Vichnist" (2000), "Nespishnist" (2002), "Dotyk" (2004), "Adam i Yeva" (2005), "Chas syren" (2006);
- Series of decorative reliefs: "Stadnyi instynkt" (1999), "Honytva za vitrom" (2000), "Dialohy", "Buttia" (both 2006).

== Awards ==
- Zenovii Flinta Prize (1988),
- Grand Prix of the All-Ukrainian Ceramics Symposium (Opishnia, Poltava Oblast, 1999),
- 1st Prize of the All-Ukrainian Symposium of Artistic Ceramics (Sloviansk, Donetsk Oblast, 2005),
- Scholarship recipient of the "Gaude Polonia" award from the Ministry of Culture and National Heritage of Poland.

== Bibliography ==
- Drul Hanna Yosypivna / O. M. Holubets // Encyclopedia of Modern Ukraine [Online] / Eds. : I. М. Dziuba, A. I. Zhukovsky, M. H. Zhelezniak [et al.] ; National Academy of Sciences of Ukraine, Shevchenko Scientific Society. – Kyiv : The NASU institute of Encyclopedic Research, 2008, upd. 2024.
- Ганна Друль. Українське сучасне жіноче мистецтво. Виставки проєкту #WomensArtNow 2018.
