= Vasyl Bodnarchuk =

Ukrainian ceramic artist (born 1948)

- Василь Дмитрович Боднарчук
- Born: 9 September 1948 (age 77)
- Education: Kosiv Technical School of Folk Crafts, Lviv Institute of Applied and Decorative Arts
- Occupation: Ceramic artist
- Awards: Merited Painter of Ukraine

Vasyl Bodnarchuk (Ukrainian: Василь Дмитрович Боднарчук; born 9 September 1948) is a Ukrainian ceramic artist. Member of the National Union of Artists of Ukraine (2004).

== Biography ==
Vasyl Bodnarchuk was born on 9 September 1948 in Tiaziv, now part of the Yamnytsia rural hromada in the Ivano-Frankivsk Raion of Ivano-Frankivsk Oblast, Ukraine.

In 1968, he graduated from the Kosiv Technical School of Folk Crafts, and in 1975, he graduated from the Lviv Institute of Applied and Decorative Arts (his teachers were Borys Horbaliuk, Dmytro Krvavych, Roman Selskyi, and Zenovii Flinta). From 1975 to 1978, he worked as an artist-designer at the Lviv Central Design Bureau; from 1978 to 1990, he worked at the Lviv Art and Production Combine; from 1994 to 2000, he was the founder and director of the private company Art Studio BV. From 2000, he has been working at the Department of Art Ceramics at the Lviv National Academy of Arts, where he has been an docent from 2014 and a private professor from 2016.

== Creativity ==
In 1976, he began exhibiting his works at exhibitions (including international ones (Poland, 1999–2001). He has held more than 20 solo exhibitions in the cities of Lviv (1998, 2013, 2017, 2018, 2021, 2025), Ivano-Frankivsk (2002), Ternopil (2003), Kosiv (2015), and Khmelnytskyi (2016). He has participated in ceramics symposiums in Opishnia and Mala Bilozerka and the Ceramics Biennale in Tuffe, France.

He works in the fields of decorative and monumental ceramics, painting, and interior and exterior design. His works are kept in the collections of the National Museum of Ukrainian Pottery in Opishnia, the Museum of Ethnography and Crafts, and others; private collections in Ukraine, Poland, France, and the USA.

Among important works:

- Garden and park compositions — "Kvity" (1984, Lviv), "Kvadratne pobachennya" (1999), "Dialoh" (2000; both — settlement Opishnia);
- Sculpture "Adam i Yeva" (2000);
- Volume-spatial plastics — "Do i pislia mileniuma" (2001), "Osin' u Karpatakh", "Antaliiski akvareli", "Dvoie" (all — 2002), "Samotni ostrovy" (2003);
- Decorative series — "Dohoraiucha osin", "Suprematychni variatsii" (both — 2001), "Mandry u vidtynku dnia", "Peizazh", "Antaliiski akvareli" (all — 2002);
- Decorative vases "Yehypetski variatsii" (2002);
- Decorative panels — "Bereh", "Khvylia", "Ozero" (all — 2003).

== Awards ==
- Merited Painter of Ukraine (7 October 2009)

== Bibliography ==
- Олійник Н. Львівська осінь в Опішному, або Симпозіум гончарства в портретах. Коли квіти — початок дороги: Василь Боднарчук // Укр. керамологія: Нац. наук. щоріч. Опішня, 2001. Кн. 1.
- Чегусова З. Декоративне мистецтво України кінця ХХ століття. 200 імен: Альбом-каталог. К., 2002.
- Позмогова З. Василь Боднарчук — кераміст високої культури // Образотворче мистецтво. — 2009. — № 3. — С. 36—37.
- Боднарчук В. Д. Кераміка. Малярство : [альбом] / Василь Дмитрович Боднарчук ; авт. тексту Василь Дмитрович Боднарчук, Орест Голубець, Роман Яців. — Львів : Колір ПРО, 2018. — 127 с. : кольор. іл., портр.
