= Hanna Lysyk =

Ukrainian artist of decorative ceramics (born 1964)

- Ганна Євгенівна Лисик
- Born: 8 May 1964 (age 62); Lviv (now Ukraine)
- Education: Lviv Institute of Applied and Decorative Arts
- Occupation: Artist of decorative ceramics

Hanna Lysyk (Ukrainian: Ганна Євгенівна Лисик; born 8 May 1964) is a Ukrainian artist of decorative ceramics. Member of the National Union of Artists of Ukraine (1995). Daughter of Oksana Zinchenko and Yevhen Lysyk.

== Biography ==
Hanna Lysyk was born on 8 May 1964, in Lviv.

In 1987, she graduated from the Lviv Institute of Applied and Decorative Arts, where she studied under Borys Horbaliuk and Ivan Frank. Starting in 1988, she worked at the Lviv Experimental Ceramic and Sculptural Factory. In the 1990s, she transitioned to independent creative work. In 2005, she was awarded the "Gaude Polonia" scholarship by the Polish Ministry of Culture in Wrocław.

== Creativity ==
In 1990, she began presenting her works at regional, all-Ukrainian, and international exhibitions. Solo exhibitions took place in Wrocław (2006), Lviv (2012), and Khmelnytskyi (2024). From 2006 to 2009, she chaired the artistic ceramics section of the Lviv organization of the National Union of Artists of Ukraine.

In her works, Lysyk demonstrates her unique visual and plastic form, pushing the boundaries between realistic and surreal imagery. One can also trace a kinship with contemporary archaeological avant-garde, characterized by a distinctive worldview and multifaceted artistic language, and archaic ceramics from ancient civilizations, evident in refined minimalist aesthetics and impeccable execution. Her pieces feature matte, subdued natural colors, handmade textures, and original dot-structure ornaments. In the late 1990s, bio-, zoo-, and anthropomorphic motifs were introduced into her works. Lysyk's "ceramic graphics" from the 2010s predominantly explore lyrical and poetic themes of autumn and winter gardens. Selected works are preserved in the collections of the Khmelnytskyi Regional Art Museum and the Riga Porcelain Museum.

Among the important works:

- decorative compositions — "Materynstvo" (1986), "Ravlyky" (1988), "Zviryatko", "Husenytsya" (both 1994), "Dovha doroha" (1995), "Velyki murashky" (2002);
- decorative vessels — "Ptakh" (1995), "Ryba" (1997), "Zabavka", "Ustrytsya" (both 1998), "Posudyna-kolodyaz" (1999), "Bez nazvy" (2000), "Tykhа posudyna" (2003);
- decorative sculpture — "Kvasolka", "Piznya osin" (both 2005), "Zymova podorozh" (2006), "Tsvirkun" (2007);
- series "Zymovyy sad" (2009–2012).

== Reviews ==
Art history Orest Holubets: "When I was transporting ceramists' works to Munich for an exhibition, German customs officials didn't want to let Anna Lysyk's works cross the border, claiming they weren't contemporary pieces. They only gave permission after I showed them my book "Lviv Ceramics", which highlights the development of the Lviv school of ceramics from the 1940s to the 1980s, and where Anna's works are described and photographed".

At the same time, Roman Yatsiv, a professor of art history, believes that "her images appear spontaneously — according to moods and feelings, therefore always unexpected. And the forms in which those images are embodied are always justified. Anna doesn't have rote techniques; she knows how to change according to the task she sets for herself. A harmonious component dominates her thinking".

== Awards ==
- Zenovii Flinta Prize (2012)
- Grand Prix of the art ceramics exhibition-competition "KeramPIK in Opishnia!" (2010, Opishnia, Poltava Oblast)
