= Andriy Bokotey =

Ukrainian artist (born 1938)

- Андрій Андрійович Бокотей
- Born: 21 March 1938 (age 88); Brid, now Zakarpattia Oblast, Ukraine
- Education: Lviv Institute of Applied and Decorative Arts
- Occupation: Artist
- Awards: Order of Prince Yaroslav the Wise; Order of Merit of the Republic of Poland; Order of Merit of the Republic of Hungary; People's Artist of Ukraine; Shevchenko National Prize; Merited Figure of Arts of Ukraine

Andriy Bokotey or Andrii Bokotei (Ukrainian: Андрій Андрійович Бокотей; born 21 March 1938), is a Ukrainian artist. He became a pioneer in Ukraine as a representative of the global movement of artistic studio glass. Full member (academician) of the National Academy of Arts of Ukraine (2000). Founder and chairman of the organizing committee of ten International Symposiums on Glass Art in Lviv (1989–2016).

== Biography ==
Andriy Bokotey was born in Brid, Khust Raion, Zakarpattia Oblast. He received his art education at the Department of Artistic Ceramics of the Lviv Institute of Applied and Decorative Arts. He studied under Roman Selskyi, Karlo Zvirynskyi, Danylo Dovboshynskyi, and Dmytro Krvavych. In 1965, after graduating, he began teaching at the department where he studied. At the beginning of his creative career, he worked in the field of artistic ceramics, artistic glass, and painting. In 1970, he became a member of the Union of Artists of Ukraine. In 1991–1992, he headed the Lviv organization of the Union of Artists of Ukraine. In 1994, Andriy Bokotey received the title of professor and headed the Department of Art Glass. From 1996, he was vice-rector for academic affairs, and in 2000, he was appointed rector.

On 1 July 2015, he resigned from his position as rector of the Lviv National Academy of Arts at his own request. That same month, he became head of the newly established Western Regional Scientific and Art Center of the National Academy of Arts of Ukraine, which he led until July 2022.

== Family ==
Father Andrii Leontiiovych (1909–1992) — Greek Catholic priest; mother Mariia Mykolaivna (1912–1996) — musician; wife Oresta Mykhailivna (1947–2014) — economist, chief accountant of the Lviv State Technical and Economic College. He has two sons. The elder — Andrii Bokotei (1966), ornithologist, Doctor of Biological Sciences, professor at the Ivan Franko National University of Lviv. The younger son, Mykhaylo Bokotey (1976), worked in the Ministry of Foreign Affairs of Ukraine, in diplomatic positions at the Embassy of Ukraine in the Republic of Poland, and today heads the Glass Museum of Lviv and the Department of Art Glass at the Lviv National Academy of Arts.

== Creativity ==
Solo exhibitions were held in Nancy (1992, France), Lviv (1988, 1995, 2018), Liège (1993, Belgium), Utrecht (1996, Netherlands), and Kyiv (2001).

Among his works:

- Tableware set (1968). The ceramic pieces are tetrahedral in shape. The central element of the ensemble is a tall jug. The decoration of the work uses a partial glazing technique. The main background has a matte ochre-red surface with individual elements decorated with brown glaze.
- Drinking set (1968). The work combines two simple volumes: a cylindrical base combined with a square neck. The decor resembles rusticated walls.
- Ceramic cladding for the Lviv restaurant. The work was done in collaboration with Zenovii Flinta and Vasyl Kondratiuk.
- Modular grille for the winter garden of the Pivdenny sanatorium in Truskavets (1979). Created in collaboration with Zenovii Flinta and Vasyl Kondratiuk.
- "Metamorfozy" (1975)
- "Henri Muru prysviachuietsia" (1973)
- "Chumatskyi shliakh" (1978)
- "Vsesvit" (1978–1980)
- Spatial composition for the central hall of the Lviv bus station (1980)
- "Hutsulski madonny" (1981)
- "Kozak Mamai" (1983)
- "Ekos-2" (1988)
- "Ihrashky dlia doroslykh" (1990)
- "Proty techi" (1990)
- "Rivnovaha" (1994)
- "Apokalipsys" (1996)
- "Moisei" (2003)
- Plastic art series "Peizazhni kompozytsii" (2008). The work is made of colored glass using the glassblowing technique.
- Series of decorative layers "Peizazhi" (2010). The work is made of colored glass using the glassblowing technique.
- "Fihura na vozi" (2011)
- "Sydiacha fihura"
- Plastic art series "Venetian nytka" (2011)
- "Kin ta vershnyk na vizku"
- "Meditatsii"
- "Taiemna vecheria" (2018)
- "Terakotova armiia" (2019)
- "Taiemna vecheria 2021"
- "Anhely" (2023)
- "Vykradenyi (Zakhysnyk)" (2024)

== Awards ==
- Knight's Cross of the Order of Merit of the Republic of Hungary (28 March 2018)
- Order of Prince Yaroslav the Wise, 4th class (22 August 2016)
- Order of Prince Yaroslav the Wise, 5th class (21 March 2013)
- Knight's Cross of the Order of Merit of the Republic of Poland (8 May 2009)
- People's Artist of Ukraine (18 January 2007)
- Taras Shevchenko National Prize of Ukraine (2002)
- Merited Figure of Arts of Ukraine (1989).

== Bibliography ==
- Голубець О. Львівська кераміка / Орест Голубець. — Київ : Наукова думка, 1991. — С. 21, 32, 96, 107. — ISBN 5-12-001783-1.
- Бокотей Андрій Андрійович // Львівська національна академія мистецтв. — Київ : Логос, 2010. — С. 24–26. — ISBN 978-966-2664-01-0.
