= Iryna Marko =

Ukrainian artist of decorative and applied arts (born 1967)

- Ірина Валеріївна Марко
- Born: 28 February 1967 (age 59); Zaporizhzhia
- Education: Donetsk Art School, Lviv Institute of Applied and Decorative Arts
- Occupations: Artist of decorative and applied arts

Iryna Marko (Ukrainian: Ірина Валеріївна Марко; born 28 February 1967) is a Ukrainian artist of decorative and applied arts. Member of the National Union of Artists of Ukraine (2012).

== Biography ==
Iryna Marko was born on 28 February 1967, in Zaporizhzhia.

In 1986, she graduated from the Department of Artistic Design of the Donetsk Art School, and in 1993, from the Department of Artistic Ceramics of the Lviv Institute of Applied and Decorative Arts (specialty teachers S. Andrusiv, T. Yanko). After graduation, she was active in the creative workshop of the Lviv Experimental Ceramic and Sculptural Factory. In 2000, she began working independently as an artist.

== Creativity ==
From 1987, Marko has participated in city, regional, and national (all-Ukrainian) exhibitions. Solo exhibitions have taken place in Lviv (2012–2014; 2015, jointly with Hanna Drul), Orońsko (Poland, 2013–2014), Chernivtsi (2014), and Kyiv (2015). The artist's oeuvre includes ceramic decorative compositions. Individual works are preserved in museum institutions in Ukraine, as well as in private collections in Ukraine, the US, Europe, and Japan.

Among important works: "Chaynyk iz pidnosom", "Dialoh" (both 2007), "Harbuzova para" (2010), "Prazvir" (2011), "Toi, shcho z oseni" (2012), "Budiak", "Otsvitina" (both 2014), "Hranat", "Skybky kavuna" (both 2015).

== Awards ==
- 3rd prize at the 3rd National Exhibition-Competition of Artistic Ceramics (Opishnia, 2011)
- Silver award at the Vasyl Krychevskyi Ukrainian Biennial of Artistic Ceramics (Opishnia, 2017)

== Bibliography ==
- Marko Iryna Valeriivna / N. V. Kosmolinska // Encyclopedia of Modern Ukraine [Online] / Eds. : I. М. Dziuba, A. I. Zhukovsky, M. H. Zhelezniak [et al.] ; National Academy of Sciences of Ukraine, Shevchenko Scientific Society. – Kyiv : The NASU institute of Encyclopedic Research, 2018.
