= Yaroslav Kruk =

Ukrainian painter (1947–2024)

Yaroslav Kruk Ярослав Крук
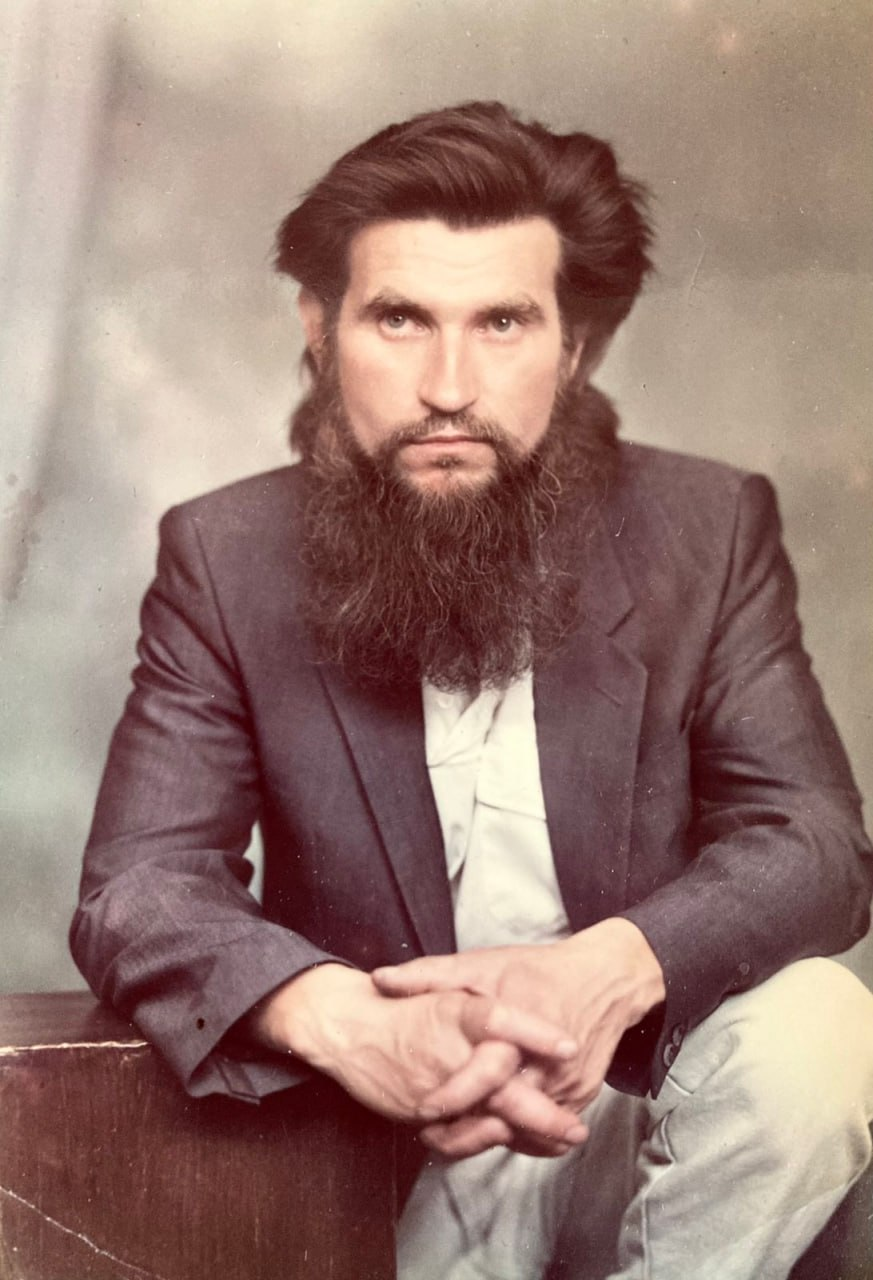
- Yaroslav Kruk in 1970s
- Born: 21 March 1947; Briukhovychi, Lviv Oblast (now Ukraine)
- Died: 2 April 2024 (aged 77); Lviv, Ukraine
- Resting place: Briukhovychi
- Movement: Impressionism

Yaroslav Pavlovych Kruk (Ukrainian: Ярослав Павлович Крук, KROOK; 21 March 1947 – 2 April 2024) was a Ukrainian painter, draftsman, and sculptor associated with the Lviv artistic school of the late 20th century. Known for his impressionist and romantic portraiture, Kruk created over two thousand works, including landscapes, cityscapes, and portraits of cultural figures such as Myroslav Skoryk.

== Biography ==
Yaroslav Kruk was born into a Ukrainian-Polish family in the Urban Village of Briukhovychi of Lviv Region. Both of his parents were peasants. His father, Kruk Pavlo Teodorovych, had a secondary education and served in the Polish army during World War II. He spent six years in captivity in Germany, after which he returned and worked as a carpenter. His mother, Kolodzei Viktoriia Martynivna, completed an eight-year school and worked on a Soviet collective farm.

Yaroslav was the middle child of three: his older sister died at the age of one at the beginning of the war, and his younger sister Halyna remained close to him until his death. From a young age, Yaroslav had lung problems, so he strengthened his health through a disciplined lifestyle, drank very little, and didn't smoke. Family and friends affectionately called him Slavko.

=== Beginning of Artistic Career ===
From early childhood, Yaroslav had a strong inclination toward art. He first played a handmade violin, later becoming fascinated by drawing, eventually deciding to become an artist. He began studying art in his youth, initially drawing with charcoal and pencils. His intentions were serious, so at the age of 14, his father enrolled him in an art studio at the House of Creativity in Lviv. His first art teacher was Mykhailo Lantukh, a representative of Kharkiv school of painting. Even after becoming a recognized artist, Yaroslav maintained a close relationship with Mykhailo Lantukh until the latter’s death.

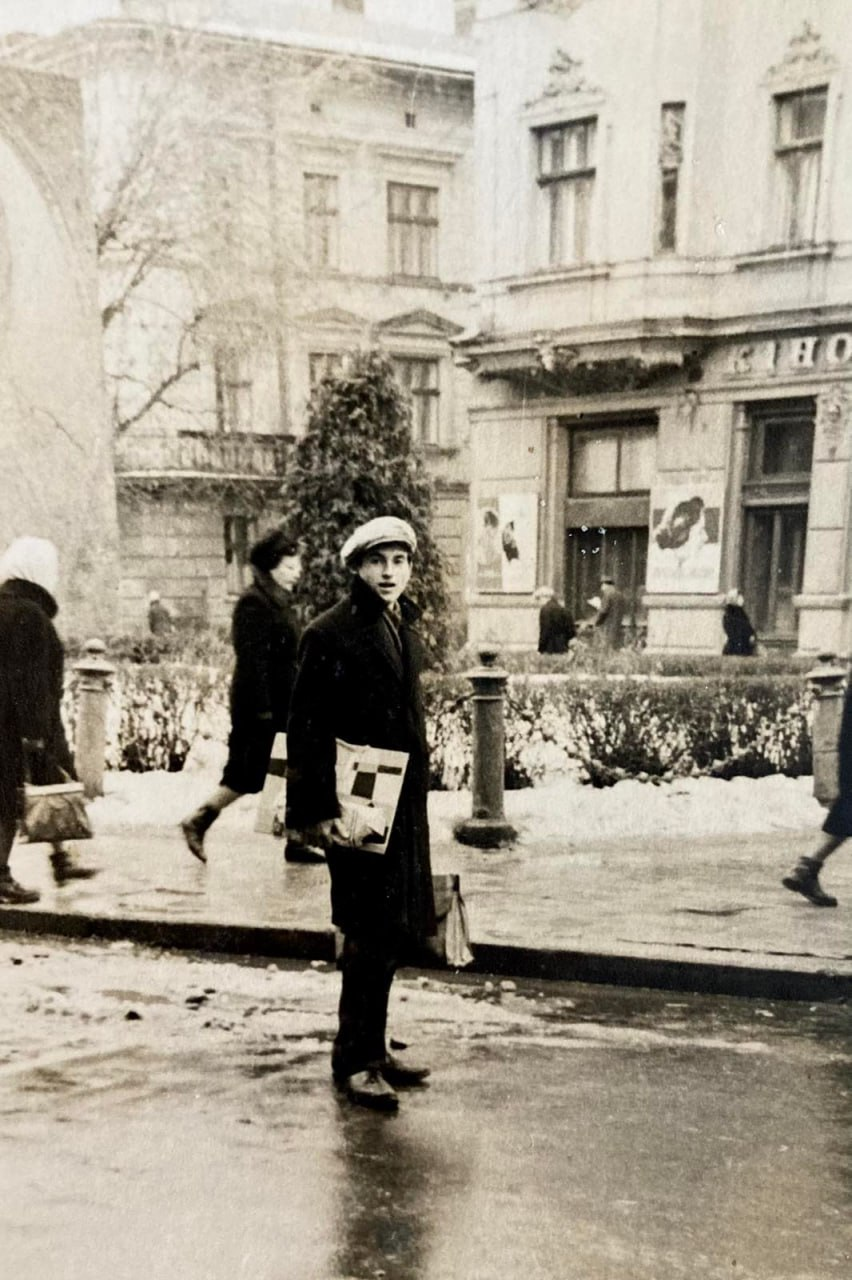
Yaroslav Kruk during his student years. Photograph from the 1960s

In 1963, Yaroslav entered Lviv Ivan Trush College of Decorative and Applied Arts, where he studied under the prominent Lviv watercolorist and teacher Stefan Kostyrko, specializing in “Decorative Painting”. He graduated in 1968 with a qualification as a master artist. From 1969 to 1975, he studied at Lviv State Institute of Applied and Decorative Art (now Lviv National Academy of Arts), majoring in Decorative and Applied Arts. His teachers included the Ukrainian sculptor and ceramics master M. Hladkyi, Soviet Ukrainian painter and educator Maksysko Teofil Stepanovych, and Ukrainian art historian and Honored Art Worker of Ukraine Volodymyr Ovsiichuk. Even during his studies, artists like Roman Selskyi and Zenovii Ketsalo predicted a great future for him. He received his diploma in 1975, receiving a ‘good’ grade for his work, the panel ‘Friendship of Peoples.’

In the 1970s–1980s, he danced in the Honored Vocal and Choreographic Ensemble of Ukraine “Halychyna” (Lviv). He also designed costume sketches for stage productions. In the late 1980s, he lived in Leningrad (Russia), where he spent much time in museums, especially the Hermitage, carefully observing paintings. Yaroslav would sit in front of a painting for hours, admiring and studying each brushstroke. For instance, he spent several days observing “The Last Day of Pompeii”. At home, he had a library of reproductions of famous artists, which he studied for hours throughout his life. He was deeply inspired by the art of talented painters. During this period, he was still exploring his artistic style, working on various subjects. Nevertheless, many watercolor landscapes and portrait sketches were created at that time.

=== The Peak of Activity ===
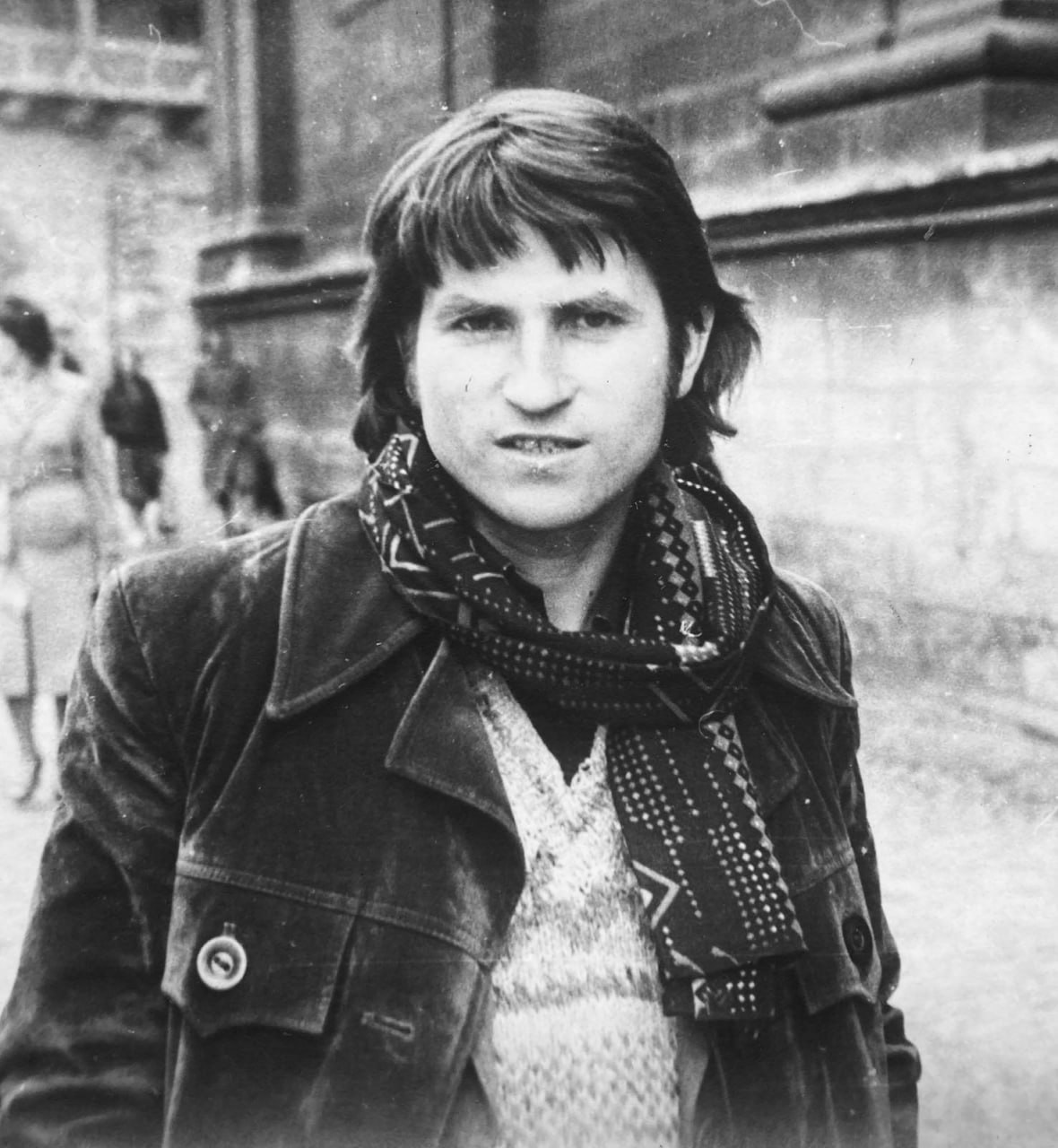
Yaroslav Kruk, 1970s

While working at Lviv Art and Production Enterprise, Yaroslav Kruk was given an attic space for an art studio in building No. 5 on Rynok Square (formerly the Hanlivska townhouse), where he lived and worked until 2005. There, he painted in the styles of impressionism and romanticism. During this period, he was immersed in the artistic bohemian environment and often interacted with creative contemporaries—painters, poets, writers, musicians, and singers. Among them were Stepan Tarasovych, Pavlo Fediuk, and Roman Fedoriv. Because of his bohemian lifestyle by day, Slavko often painted at night, which led to many of his works having darker tones. This earned him the nickname “The Artist of the Moonlit Night” from Roman Fedoriv. Throughout this time and beyond, Yaroslav frequently visited the opera, which he adored. The bohemian period was marked by a prolific output of work, particularly in the genre of nude, female figures, Lviv cityscapes, and portraits of notable figures, including: consul Yaroslav Nakonechny, composer Myroslav Skoryk, writer Bohdan Levyk, opera soloist Stepan Tarasovych. In Slavko’s life, there was both great love and long-term relationships, but Art always undeniably came first. As a result, both his personal life and finances suffered, as he had to meet the expectations of his partners and society. During this period, the artist’s style leaned toward Expressionism, though Impressionism and Romanticism were still present.

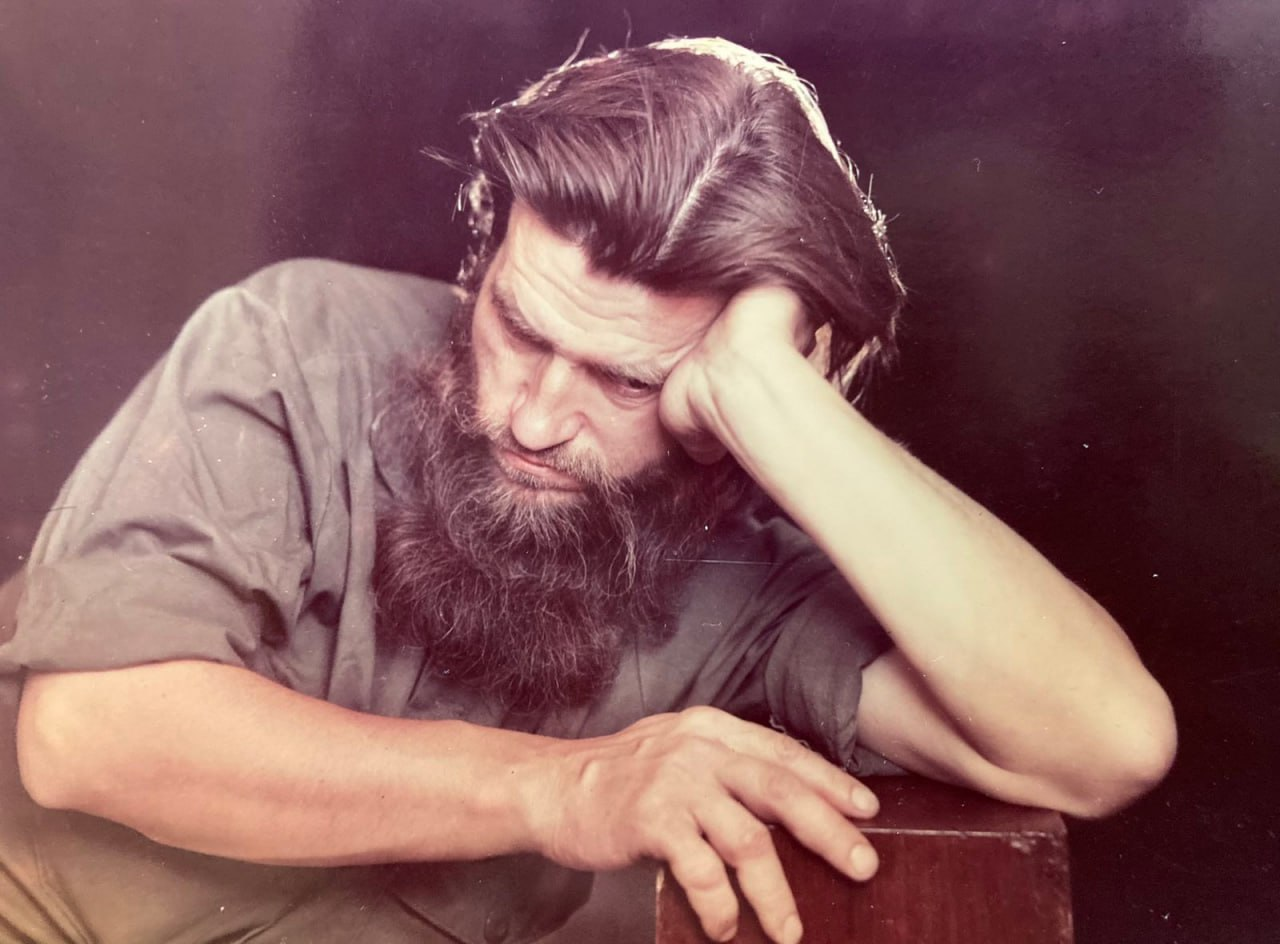
Yaroslav Kruk, 1980s

Throughout his life, Yaroslav Kruk aspired to follow his own creative path, staying true to himself and developing a distinctive style that took shape quite early. For this reason, he never joined any artistic organizations or collectives, despite having many acquaintances and friendships and exhibiting his work multiple times, particularly at Lviv Palace of Arts and the Union of Artists. Painter Yaroslav Kruk was proficient in various techniques: oil, tempera, watercolor, pastel, and worked across multiple genres (landscape, portrait painting and drawing, nude). However, he ultimately became renowned as a master of impressionistic and romantic portraiture.

Despite being open, sociable, and surrounded by friends and acquaintances, Yaroslav Kruk remained an enigmatic loner who liked to disappear suddenly and for long periods, escaping the city to draw strength from nature and create. Yaroslav Kruk’s creative legacy consists of over 2,000 paintings, including works some may consider unfinished, though he saw them differently, as canvases with intentional incompleteness, created in a moment of inspiration. In his native surroundings, he felt spiritually at home, saying, "They have a heart..." according to Oksana Saiko.

Yaroslav Kruk passed away at the age of 77 from complications related to diabetes on April 2, 2024, in Lviv. He was buried in his native Urban Village of Briukhovychi, on Krukova Hora.

== Exhibitions ==
Kruk had relatively few exhibitions (most of which were held in Lviv), yet his art was well known in the city’s cultural scene. This was perhaps because of his extremely distinctive painting style. Kruk was known especially for his portraits, done mainly in charcoal, pencil, or pastel.

Group Exhibitions:

- 1975 – Exhibition of Young Artists’ Works, Kyiv
- 1979–1980 – Exhibition of Artists from Western Regions of Ukraine, Lviv, Kyiv, Moscow
- 1984 – Zonal Exhibition “Urengoy–Uzhhorod”
- 1985 – Republican Exhibition “Picturesque Ukraine”
- 1987 – Regional Art Exhibition “Autumn Salon”

In the 1990s, he had solo exhibitions at the Ukrainian Writers' Union Hall, and in 1998 and 1999 at Ivan Franko University in Lviv. In 2000, he exhibited his works at the Powder Tower and the Lviv Historical Museum, and in 2009 at the Palace of Arts.

=== Selected works ===
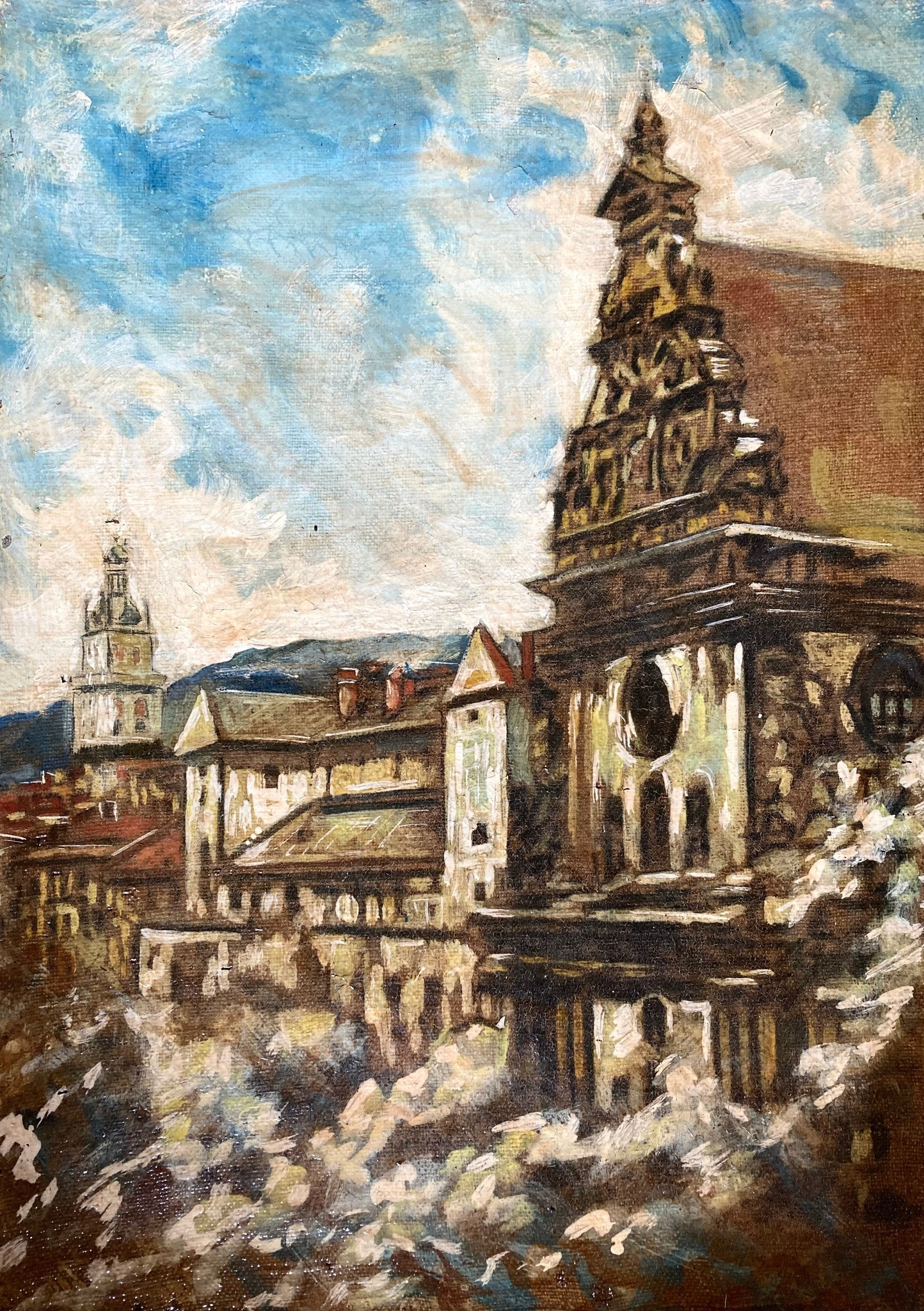
Cityscape of Bernardine Church, Lviv, 1993

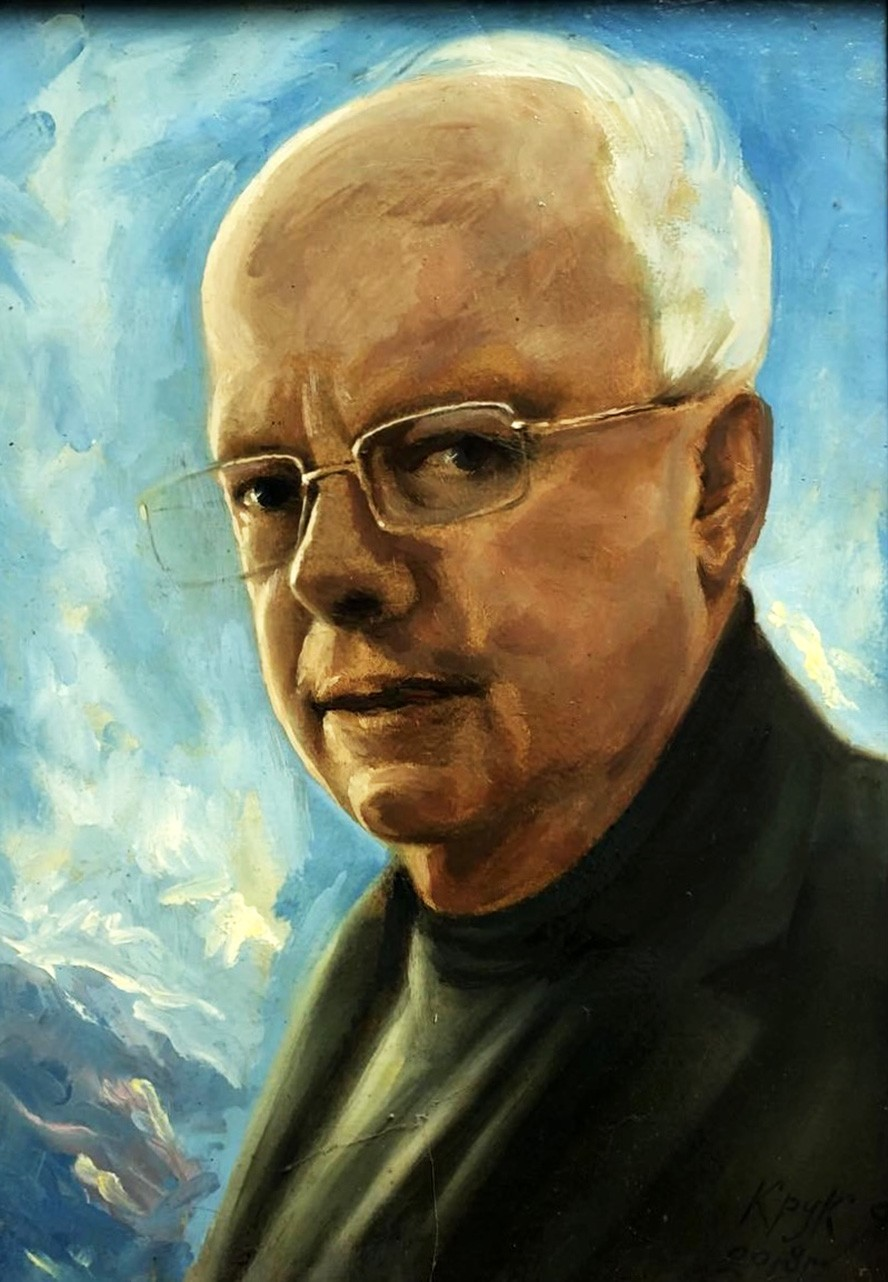
Portrait of Myroslav Skoryk, 2018

Most of Yaroslav Kruk’s artworks remain untitled. During one of his solo exhibitions at the Writers’ Union in 1998, when journalist Nadiia Morykvas asked him, “Why are your paintings untitled?”, Kruk replied: “They’re not signed, that’s all. I know their titles, but I don’t sign the works—so that everyone reads them in their own way”.

Urban and rural landscapes are predominantly executed in an expressionist manner. His creative output includes several impressionist paintings of Carpathian nature: the artist returned to this motif in the 1980s and 2000s.

He produced a series of nude drawings. His portrait works are particularly interesting: he painted historical figures such as Hetman Ivan Mazepa, as well as his contemporaries - composer Myroslav Skoryk, opera singer Stepan Tarasovych, and journalist Andriy Levyk.

== See also ==
- Roman Selskyi
