= Tiaziv =

Rural locality in Ivano-Frankivsk Oblast, Ukraine

Tiaziv Тязів
- Location in Ivano-Frankivsk Oblast Tiaziv (Ukraine)
- Coordinates: 49°0′59″N 24°42′2″E
- Country: Ukraine
- Oblast: Ivano-Frankivsk Oblast
- Raion: Ivano-Frankivsk Raion
- Hromada: Yamnytsia rural hromada
- Time zone: UTC+2 (EET)
  - Summer (DST): UTC+3 (EEST)
- Postal code: 77415

Tiaziv (Ukrainian: Тязів) is a village in the Yamnytsia rural hromada of the Ivano-Frankivsk Raion of Ivano-Frankivsk Oblast in Ukraine.

== History ==
In 2017, celebrations for the 795th anniversary of the village took place.

On 19 July 2020, as a result of the administrative-territorial reform and liquidation of the Tysmenytsia Raion, the village became part of the Ivano-Frankivsk Raion.

== Religion ==
- Saint Michael church (1938, wooden)

== Notable residents ==
- Vasyl Bodnarchuk (born 1948), Ukrainian ceramic artist

== Bibliography ==
- "Ciężów". Geographical Dictionary of the Kingdom of Poland (in Polish). 1. Warszawa: Kasa im. Józefa Mianowskiego. 1880. p. 702.
