= Svitlana Yeremenko =

- Світлана Єременко
- Born: March 15, 1959 (age 67); Ukrainian Soviet Socialist Republic (USSR) (present-day Ukraine)
- Citizenship: Ukraine
- Education: Taras Shevchenko National University of Kyiv
- Occupations: journalist, editor, media-expert, NGO manager, writer

Svitlana Yeremenko (Ukrainian: Світлана Федорівна Єременко)—born 15 March 1959, is a Ukrainian journalist, editor, media-expert, non-governmental, non-profit organizations, NGO manager, and the author of the book “Art, as prayer”.

== Biography ==
Svitlana Yeremenko was born in Volytsia, Mostytskyi district, Lviv region. She was raised in Chervonoarmiisk, Zhytomyr region where she attended high school. In 1983, Yeremenko completed her studies at Taras Shevchenko National University of Kyiv, department of journalism. In 1998, she also completed an internship in the United States and Poland and received a NGO Manager Certificate.

== Career ==
She worked at “Donbass Komsomolets” (“Accent”) youth newspaper editorial office as a correspondent and a desk editor from 1983 to 1994. In September 1993, she was illegally dismissed from her job for her pro Ukrainian views and the use of her native language. The Donetsk district department of the National Union of Journalists of Ukraine protested against her illegal dismissal. Yeremenko, the first journalist to be fired under such circumstances in the Donetsk region, she challenged her dismissal at the Kyiv National Court of Donetsk which overturned the dismissal and reinstated her to her position She voluntarily left the post in 1994, because of the continued bullying. The “Club of native language” (the Ukrainian centerfold of the Russian newspaper) was closed and “under no means was she allowed to write political content.., cover the problems of the Ukrainian school…”.

S. Yeremenko — one of the most active journalists of Donetsk who told the truth about the RUKH – People’s Movement of Ukraine ("The Movement") while pro-party (communist) publications picked on it. In particular, she initiated a series of interviews with famous activists of the national democratic movement: I.Drach, V. Iavorivsky, V. Pylypchiuk, and M. Horyn. From the first years of its existence she supported the Society of Ukrainian Language, advocated for the opening of the first Ukrainian school and Ukrainian lyceum in Donetsk. Svitlana participated in and informed the readers about the cultural and ecological hiking trip “Dzvin - 90”, the International Congress of Ukrainians, and the “Chervona Ruta” festival. She worked actively for the independence of Ukraine before the All-national Referendum on the 1st of December 1991.... Svitlana wrote about the first strikes of miners and "The Movement's" conferences.

- In 1992 Svitlana became a member of the foundational editorial board of the first independent newspaper in the Donetsk region – “Skhidnyi Chasopys” (“The Eastern Journal”) in Ukrainian (she was the only professional journalist in the editorial office), founded by the Donetsk district Society of Ukrainian language, first as an addition to the “Donnechchyna” newspaper, and then as an independent periodical. In 1997 the newspaper ceased to exist due to a variety of reasons, and also financial difficulties.
- From 1995 to 2004 she was a co-founder and chief editor of the scientific, analytical and information magazine – “Skhid” (“The East”).
- In 2001 Svitlana created the Donetsk public organization of journalists, “Donetsk press-club”; co-founder and director of the club. The mission of the press-club was uniting the journalists, organizing of meetings and press-conferences on current issues that were important for the public. Starting from 2007 Svitlana managed the National press-club of the Center for Ukrainian Reforms and Education in Kyiv.
- From 2004 she was the editor of the analytical and information magazine “Aspekty Samovriaduvannia” – “The Aspects of self governance”, of the US-Ukraine Foundation. «During the time of S. Yeremenko’s editorship, the magazine had become the handbook for mayors and local governance experts”.
- From 2011 to present — Pylyp Orlyk Institute for Democracy. Svitlana coordinates general flow of projects for the institute. The main area of study for the institute is the systematic analysis of the civic society issues and the development of democracy in Ukraine.
- From 2012 to present Svitlana is in charge of the Center for Ukrainian Reforms and Education (CURE) project, monitoring regional mass media for the presence of so-called “jeans” material (articles with signs of political or commercial commissioning ) and compliance with the professional standards of journalism in Lviv, Donetsk, Kharkiv, Vinnytsia and Sumy regions of Ukraine as well as Crimea. In her speeches, Svitlana sharply raises the issues of the freedom of speech, proficiency level of journalists, and the necessity of maintaining professional ethics.

== Social activism ==
From 2001 to 2004 Svitlana managed the Coalition of non-governmental organizations -“Partnership for transparent society” - fighting against corruption in the Donetsk region. (Eighteen NGOs were members of the Partnership).

In October and November 2004 she was the coordinator for the International Observation Mission in Ukraine (ENEMO ) in the Donetsk region. Svitlana organized the work of international observers during the presidential elections in 2004.

She is the author of various projects aimed at the development of democracy, strengthening of the civic society, fighting corruption, affirmation of the freedom of speech, negotiating the productive dialog between mass-media and NGOs, and engaging the citizens in participation as well as high public activity during elections.

== Books ==
- The History of the Ukrainian and World culture. - «The Eastern publication house». 1999 р. (Editor).
- Choose your own future! — «Ukrainian Center of Cultural Studies», 1998 (co-author of the concept, design and contents for the collection of brochures, the aim of which was engaging citizens to participate in the presidential elections).
- Oleg Minko album cover. Svitlana Yeremenko – the author of the novel/essay: “Oleg Minko: Art as a prayer”, - «CityPress Company», 2010.
- Oleh Minko. — Citi Press Company, 2010 (this is the book and the album about the unique Ukrainian postmodern artist. Svitlana is the author of the concept and text: «Art, as prayer», that combines artistic and documentary views together with art analysis). ... One may place Svitlana Yeremenko’s «Art, as prayer» along with essays about Émile Zola, Henri Perruchot, Bogomil Rainov ...» (Valentyn Hrytsanenko, the honored artist of Ukraine, professor from Kharkiv. Program “Knyzhkovyj koshyk”, Kharkiv district television.).

- "Postati" (Figures). Essays about the famous people of Donbass. — «The East publication house», 2011. (coauthor. «Ukraine – my true Motherland». The author of the essay about the famous composer, Serhiy Prokofiev).
- Essays published by the literature and art magazines “Kyiv”, “Berezil”, “Dnipro”, “Ukrainian Literature newspaper” and “Literary Ukraine”.

== Personal life ==
Divorced, she has two children.

== Interests ==
Svitlana is interested in art. She is the author of a number of articles and reviews on art in the “Den” newspaper and the “Ukrainian Literature newspaper”, art magazines – “Muzeinyj provulok”, “Artania”, and a series of stories on “Svoboda” radio. Svitlana’s other interests include literature, ballet, theatre, tennis, and travelling.
