= Brid, Zakarpattia Oblast =

Rural locality in Zakarpattia Oblast, Ukraine

Brid Брід
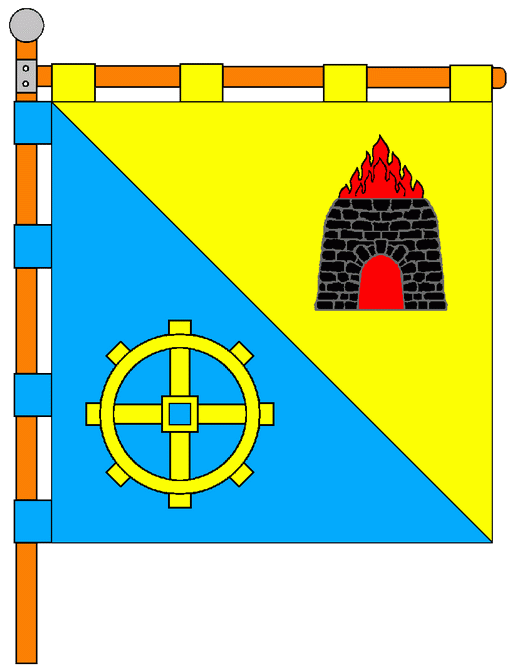
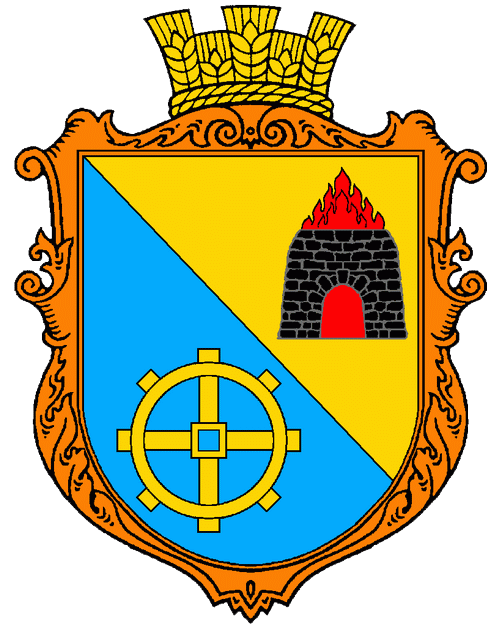
- Flag Coat of arms

- Location in Zakarpattia Oblast Brid (Ukraine)
- Coordinates: 48°20′47″N 23°0′18″E
- Country: Ukraine
- Oblast: Zakarpattia Oblast
- Raion: Khust Raion
- Hromada: Irshava urban hromada
- Time zone: UTC+2 (EET)
  - Summer (DST): UTC+3 (EEST)
- Postal code: 90115

Brid (Ukrainian: Брід) is a village in the Irshava urban hromada of the Khust Raion of Zakarpattia Oblast in Ukraine.

== History ==
The first written mention of the village was in 1264.

Currently, the courtyard of Ivan Ogary, who lived in the village of Brid, is located in the Lviv Museum of Architecture and Life "Shevchenkivskyi Hai". In 1975, a complex of buildings was transferred to the museum's collection, namely: a house, a basket, a barn, a summer oven, a beehive, a pantry, and a shed.

On 19 July 2020, as a result of the administrative-territorial reform and liquidation of the Irshava Raion, the village became part of the Khust Raion.

== Notable residents ==
- Andriy Bokotey (born 1938), Ukrainian artist
- Yurii Sak (1917–1998), Ukrainian linguist, Doctor of Philology
