= Volodymyr Mulyava =

Ukrainian politician (1937–2019)

- Володимир Мулява
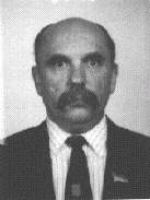
- Official portrait, 1994

People's Deputy of Ukraine
- In office 11 May 1994 – 12 May 1998
- Preceded by: Mykhailo Holubets
- Succeeded by: Constituency abolished
- Constituency: Ivano-Frankivsk Oblast, Kalush

Personal details
- Born: 12 September 1937 Lgov, Kursk Oblast, Russian SFSR, Soviet Union (now Russia)
- Died: 17 October 2019 (aged 82) Kyiv, Ukraine
- Education: Taras Shevchenko National University of Kyiv
- Awards

Military service
- Rank: Major general

Volodymyr Savovych Mulyava, or Volodymyr Muliava (12 September 1937 – 17 October 2019) was a Ukrainian philosopher and politician who served as a People's Deputy of Ukraine from Kalush between 1994 and 1998. He was hetman of Ukrainian Cossacks, appointed by the modern patriotic organization Ukrainian Cossacks, from 1992 to 1998 and then holding the honorary title of Hetman until his death.

== Biography ==
He was born on 12 September 1937 in Lgov, Kursk Oblast, which was then part of the Russian SFSR in the Soviet Union. He spent his childhood in Kirovohrad Oblast. He graduated from Taras Shevchenko National University of Kyiv in 1964. Afterwords, he worked at the Zhytomyr Agricultural Institute and the Vinnytsia Pedagogical Institute, and at the latter institute defended his doctoral dissertation to earn his Candidate of Philosophical Sciences. However, his thesis led to accusations of Ukrainian bourgeois nationanlism, and he was dismissed from employment for some time.

After regaining employment, he worked as the organizer and president of the Vinnytsia philosophical discussion club "Istyna", which eventually led to him being one of the founders of the People's Movement of Ukraine in 1989. Following the Rukh's creation, he served as the deputy head of the secretariat. In 1990 he was appointed Deputy Head of the Rukh Council Collegium, and in 1991 he joined the group for the creation of the Ministry of Defense of Ukraine. Up until his election to the Verkhovna Rada, he served variously as Head of the Social and Psychological Department and as assistant to the Minister of Defense for relations with public organizations.

From 1994 to 1998, Mulyava served as a People's Deputy of Ukraine, representing Kalush in Ivano-Frankivsk Oblast. He was a member of the Defence and State Security Committee, as well as the "Constitutional Centre" group.

== Bibliography ==
- A. M. Kolodnyi. Muliava Volodymyr Savovych in Encyclopedia of Modern Ukraine. Kyiv, 2020. Vol. 22. P. 142. (in Ukrainian)
