= Pavlivka, Ivano-Frankivsk Oblast =

Village in Ivano-Frankivsk Oblast, Ukraine

Pavlivka Павлівка
- Village
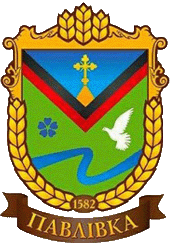
- Seal

- Location within Ivano-Frankivsk Oblast Location within Ukraine
- Coordinates: 48°58′55″N 24°38′09″E
- Country: Ukraine
- Oblast: Ivano-Frankivsk Oblast
- Raion: Ivano-Frankivsk Raion
- Time zone: UTC+2 (EET)
  - Summer (DST): UTC+3 (EEST)

Pavlivka (Ukrainian: Павлівка) is a village in Yamnytsia rural hromada, part of the Ivano-Frankivsk Raion in Ivano-Frankivsk Oblast in Ukraine.

== History ==
On 7 June 1946, by decree of the Presidium of the Verkhovna Rada of the Ukrainian SSR, the village of Pavelche was renamed to Pavlivka.

Until 18 July 2020, Pavlivka belonged to Tysmenytsia Raion. The raion was abolished in July 2020 as part of the administrative reform of Ukraine, which reduced the number of raions of Ivano-Frankivsk Oblast to six. The area of Tysmenytsia Raion was merged into Ivano-Frankivsk Raion.

There is a cemetery of soldiers of the Austro-Hungarian Army who died during World War I, destroyed by the Soviet authorities, found and placed in order in 2022.

== Demographics ==
According to the 2001 Ukrainian Census, the distribution of the native languages of the population are as below:

Language	Percentage
Ukrainian	99.73 %
Russian	0.13 %
