= Mykhailo Holubets =

Ukrainian environmental scientist and politician (1930–2016)

Merited Science and Technology Functionary Mykhailo Holubets
- Михайло Голубець
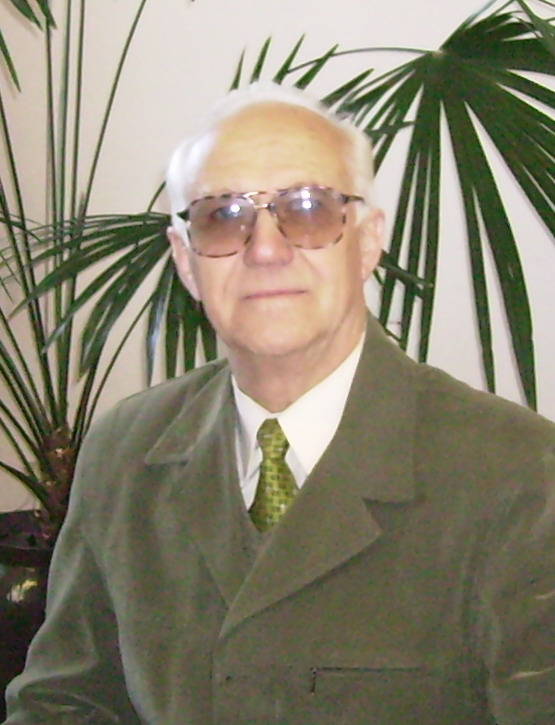
- Holubets in 2006

People's Deputy of Ukraine
- In office 15 May 1990 – 10 May 1994
- Preceded by: Position established
- Succeeded by: Volodymyr Mulyava
- Constituency: Ivano-Frankivsk Oblast, Kalush

Personal details
- Born: 30 October 1930 Lubień Wielki, Poland (now Velykyi Liubin, Ukraine)
- Died: 14 August 2016 (aged 85) Lviv, Ukraine
- Party: Congress of National-Democratic Forces
- Other political affiliations: People's Movement of Ukraine (1989–1990); Democratic Bloc
- Education: Lviv National Agrarian University
- Occupation: Politician, environmental scientist
- Awards: State Prize of Ukraine in Science and Technology, Order of Merit 3rd Class

Mykhailo Andriiovych Holubets (Ukrainian: Михайло Андрійович Голубець; 30 October 1930 – 14 August 2016) was a Ukrainian environmental scientist and politician who served as a People's Deputy of Ukraine from Kalush between 1990 and 1994. He was a member of the National Academy of Sciences of Ukraine.

Holubets was a laureate of the State Prize of Ukraine in Science and Technology, and he served as the vice-president of the Forestry Academy of Sciences of Ukraine. He held the position of honorary director of the NASU Institute of Ecology of the Carpathians. He also was an honorary doctor of Ivan Franko National University of Lviv. Father of Orest Holubets.

== Early life and scientific career ==
Mykhailo Holubets was born on 30 October 1930, in the village of Velykyi Liubin, then part of the Second Polish Republic (now in Lviv Oblast, Ukraine). In 1953, he obtained a higher education degree from Lviv Agricultural Institute with a specialization in ecology and forestry and the qualification of forestry engineer. He embarked on his scientific career in 1953 as a postgraduate student and later, from 1954 to 1957, as a lecturer at Lviv Agricultural Institute and Ukrainian National Forestry University.

In 1960, Holubets defended his dissertation to obtain the degree of Candidate of Agricultural Sciences. Until 1962, he worked as a junior and senior researcher at the Research Institute of Agriculture and Animal Husbandry of the Western Regions of the Ukrainian SSR. From 1962, Mykhailo Holubets worked in scientific institutions of the Academy of Sciences of the Ukrainian SSR. He initially served as a senior researcher at the Research Institute of Natural Sciences, and later as a senior researcher in the Department of Experimental Ecology and Biocenology at the M.G. Kholodny Institute of Botany of the Ukrainian SSR Academy of Sciences. He also held positions as the head of a department and director of the State Museum of Natural History.

In 1969, he defended his dissertation titled "Spruce Forests of the Ukrainian Carpathians" to earn a Doctor of Biological Sciences degree with a specialization in botany. He defended his dissertation at the M.V. Lomonosov Moscow State University. From 1974, Mykhailo Holubets served as the deputy director for Scientific Work at the M.G. Kholodny Institute of Botany of the Ukrainian SSR Academy of Sciences and led the Lviv branch of this institute. Simultaneously, from 1974 to 1995, he worked as a professor at the Department of Plant Morphology and Systematics at Ivan Franko Lviv State University.

In 1978, Holubets became a professor and was elected a corresponding member of the Academy of Sciences of Ukraine. From 1991 to 2007, he headed NASU Institute of Ecology of the Carpathians, and from 2008, he held the honorary position of director of the research institution.

In 1990, Holubets became an academician of the National Academy of Sciences of Ukraine. He educated specialists in the fields of ecology, botany, and forestry. Holubets was a member of the editorial boards of several scientific journals, including Studia Biologica, Ecology and Noosphereology, Scientific Works of the Forestry Academy of Sciences of Ukraine, and the Ukrainian Botanical Journal.

=== Scientific works ===
Holubets' primary research focus included the structural and functional organization of terrestrial ecosystems and geosociosystems, as well as prospects for managing sociospheric processes. He supervised postgraduate students starting from 1965. Under his guidance, 5 doctoral and 17 candidate dissertations were defended.

He paid significant attention to various issues in eidology.

Mykhailo Holubets authored approximately 500 scientific papers, including 19 monographs, and served as the editor for nearly thirty collective monographs.

Selected scientific works by Mykhailo Andriiovych Holubets include:

- "Spruce forests of the Ukrainian Carpathians" (Kyiv: Naukova Dumka, 1978) – 264 pages.
- "The Film of Life" (Lviv: Polli, 1997) – 185 pages.
- "From Biosphere to Sociosphere" (Lviv: Polli, 1997) – 252 pages.
- "Current Issues in Ecology" (Kyiv: Naukova Dumka, 1982) – 158 pages (in Russian).
- "Ecosystemology" (Lviv: Polli, 2000) – 316 pages.
- "Ecological Potential of Terrestrial Ecosystems" (Lviv: Polli, 2003) – 180 pages.

== Political career ==
Holubets joined the People's Movement of Ukraine, an anti-communist opposition movement, in 1989. He later left the organisation in 1990. From 1990 to 1994 he was a People's Deputy of Ukraine from the city of Kalush in Ivano-Frankivsk Oblast. He was chairman of the Subcommittee on Ecology and Environmental Protection and participated in the development and signing of the Belovezha Accords. He later joined the Congress of National-Democratic Forces.

Between 1995 and 1996 Holubets was a member of the Lviv Oblast Council. He served on the Lviv City Council from 1996 to 2002, and was deputy chairman of the Lviv Oblast Organisation of the Congress of Ukrainian Intelligentsia.

He published journalistic works about the People's Movement of Ukraine (1998), the Belovezha Accords (2001), the consequences of russification of the Ukrainian language (2006), "The Tree of Life" (2008) and others.

== Later life and death ==
He was the Ukrainian curator of the MAB-6a project within the Man and the Biosphere Programme and chaired sections on Fundamental and Applied Problems of Ecology of the Scientific Council on Environmental Protection and Sustainable Development of the National Academy of Sciences of Ukraine and Ecology, General Biology, and Nature Conservation of the Scientific Council of the Ministry of Education and Science of Ukraine. Holubets died on 14 August 2016, at the age of 86, and was buried in the family grave at the 59th Field of Yaniv Cemetery in Lviv.
