= Mykhaylo Bokotey =

Ukrainian glass artist (born 1976)

- Михайло Андрійович Бокотей
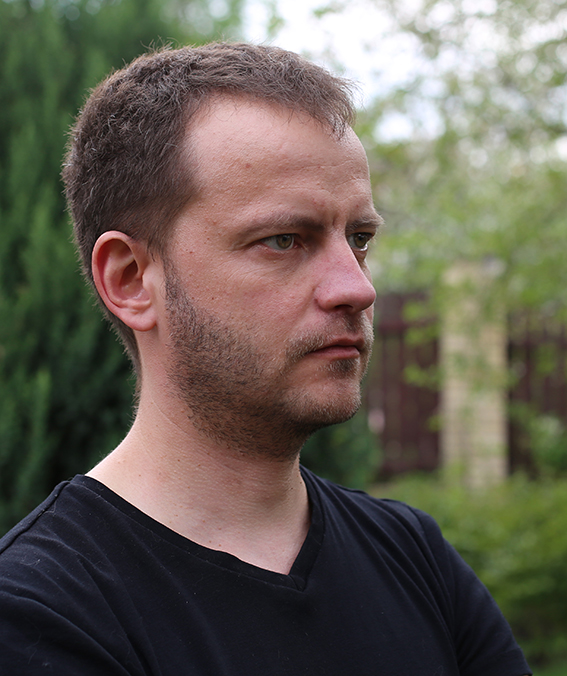
- Born: 18 December 1976 (age 49); Lviv
- Education: Lviv Academy of Arts, University of Lviv
- Occupations: Glass artist, graphic artist, painter, art historian, curator of cultural and artistic projects, educator

Mykhaylo Bokotey or Mykhailo Bokotei (Ukrainian: Михайло Андрійович Бокотей; born 18 December 1976) is a Ukrainian glass artist, graphic artist, painter, art historian, curator of cultural and artistic projects, educator. Head of the Department of Art Glass at the Lviv National Academy of Arts. Corresponding member of the National Academy of Arts of Ukraine (2021), candidate of art history (2018), docent. Son of the famous glass artist Andriy, brother of zoologist Andrii Bokotei's.

== Biography ==
Mykhaylo Bokotey was born on 18 December 1976 in Lviv.

== Creativity ==
In 1999, he graduated from the Department of Art Glass at the Lviv Academy of Arts, and in 2004, he graduated from the Faculty of Business and Law at University of Lviv. From 2000 to 2002, he worked as an attaché at the Ministry of Foreign Affairs of Ukraine, and from 2002 to 2006, he was an attaché and third secretary for culture and diplomatic protocol at the Embassy of Ukraine in Poland. From 2012, he has been a senior lecturer at the Lviv National Academy of Arts, from 2018 — acting head, and from 2021 — head of the Department of Art Glass.

From 2006 to 2010, he was a member of the board of UKR EKO Trade in Warsaw. In 2010–2012, he was the executive director of the Galician Glass manufacturing company in Lviv; in 2013–2014, he was the director of the Municipal Design Institute in Kielce (Poland).

In 2013, he became the director of the Glass Museum of Lviv. In 2016, he founded and began working as editor-in-chief of the art magazine 7UA. From 2018, he has been the executive curator of the Greenwave Glass Museum in Zhengzhou (China). From 2020 to 2021, he served as an expert for the Ukrainian Cultural Foundation.

In 2022, he became the head of the Western Regional Scientific and Art Center of the National Academy of Arts of Ukraine

== Achievements ==
He is an active curator and organizer of many art projects, including the International Symposium on Glass Art in Lviv (from 1995 to the present). He was the curator of international conferences for glass artists in China (2017, 2018) and the international residency "European Glass Education" (2020). He is the co-organizer and curator of the Andriy Bokotey Award for young glass artists, which has been presented since 2018.

He came up with the idea and concept for the Lviv National Academy of Arts Gallery, which became the student gallery of the Lviv National Academy of Arts.

The works were presented at collective exhibitions in Ukraine, China, Lithuania, France, and Hungary. Author of scientific publications and educational materials, as well as curator of over 90 cultural and artistic projects implemented in Ukraine, Poland, China, Lithuania, and the Czech Republic.

In his work, he combines painting, graphic art, and blown glass.

Among his important works are:

- the series "Svitiaz Motifs" (2016–2019), "Landscape Abstractions" (2018), "Chinese Inspirations" (2016–2019), and "Seasons" (2016–2019).

== Awards ==
- Silver Medal of the National Academy of Arts of Ukraine (2019),
- Certificate of Honor from the Ministry of Culture of Ukraine (2016),
- Letter of appreciation from the Ministry of Foreign Affairs of Ukraine (2002, 2004).
