= Karlo Zvirynsky =

Ukrainian painter (1923–1997)

- Карло Звіринський
- Born: 14 August 1923; Ławrów, Poland
- Education: Lviv Institute of Decorative and Applied Arts
- Style: Abstract art
- Movement: Ukrainian underground

Karlo Iosypovych Zvirynsky (Ukrainian: Карло́ Йо́сипович Звіри́нський; 14 August 1923 – 8 October 1997) was a Ukrainian painter.

== Biography ==
Zvirynsky received his primary education at the Saint Onuphrius Monastery in Lavriv. In 1942, having read a newspaper advertisement recruiting students for a German school of art and design, which had a Ukrainian graphics department, he traveled to Lviv. By that time, he had no interest in painting. Due to his insufficient education for admission, he took the seven-year school exams as an external student.

During this period, Lviv was home to many artists fleeing the hardships of war in eastern Ukraine. Vasyl Krychevsky, Mykola Butovych, Volodymyr Balyas, and Roman Selskyi, with whom Zvirynsky graduated in 1946 and later became friends, taught here.

Zvirynsky later continued his studies at the department of monumental painting of the Lviv Institute of Decorative and Applied Arts (now the Lviv National Academy of Arts). In 1949, he was expelled for a year for saying, "One apple by Cézanne is worth more than all the art of socialist realism combined."

In 1953, Zvirynsky began teaching painting and composition at the Lviv Institute of Decorative and Applied Arts.

== Educational activities ==
Zvirynsky began passing on his knowledge to students of the Lviv Institute of Decorative and Applied Arts, forming a small group around himself that would eventually be called the "Karlo Zvirynsky Academy," a kind of private art school. Among the students were artists who later become known were: Andriy Bokotey (now Rector of the Lviv Academy of Arts), Yevhen Lysyk (People's Artist of the Ukrainian SSR), Yaroslav Motyka (winner of the 1972 Shevchenko Prize), Zenovii Flinta, Oleh Minko, Vasyl Bazhai among others.

In addition, for a long time, Zvirynsky directed the St. Luke School of Icon Painting at the Studite Monastery in Lavriv.

== Art ==
Zvirynsky was an abstract artist, beginning his creative path with appliqué. In the 1960s, he explained his move into the abstract realm of painting, appliqué, and colored reliefs of paper or wood on canvas as an escape from socialist realism, while simultaneously acknowledging the achievements of the great realists.

In his works, Zvirynsky created a kind of parallel, highly integrated world. This worldview was already characteristic of his compositions from the late 1950s, created using wood, tin, cardboard, and cord.

Zvirynsky's legacy, however, is dominated by religious painting. He painted approximately 40 icons for the Dormition Church in Lviv and created frescoes in several churches near Lviv.

== Works ==
- "Relief III" (1957, composed of square and rectangular wooden blocks coated with layers of blue and violet paint)
- "Composition II" (1960, canvas, plaster)
- "Earth. Landscape after the Battle. Epitaph" (1962)
- "Otherworldly"
- "Compositions X" (1970)

== Literature ==
- Pavelchuk I. The flows of abstract creativity of Karl Zvirinsky // Imaginative mysticism: writing of hours nourished by history, theory, ideology, methodology, artistic nationality, aesthetics, Ukrainian education. mis / National Collection of Artists of Ukraine. — Kiev, 2010. — No. 4 (76) "2010/ 1 (77)" 2011. — P. 74–77. — ISSN 0130-1799 Karlo Zvirinsky 1923-1997: Pogadi, statti, painting / Order. T. Pechenko, H. Zvirinska. — Lviv: Malti-M, 2002. (Ukrainian) Bubnovska Bozhena. Lviv school of painting: stages of molding // ArtUkraine. — No. 5 (6). - 2008. - P.9-16. (Ukrainian) Olga Lagutenko, "The Great Hierarchy." Newspaper "Capital News" No. 5 (201) February 12–18, 2002.
