= Roman Turyn =

Ukrainian artist and film director (1900–1979)

- Роман Миколайович Турин
- Born: 2 September 1900; Sniatyn, now Ivano-Frankivsk Oblast, Ukraine
- Died: 28 July 1979 (aged 78); Lviv
- Education: Kraków Academy of Fine Arts
- Occupations: Painter, portraitist, photo artist, director, and public figure

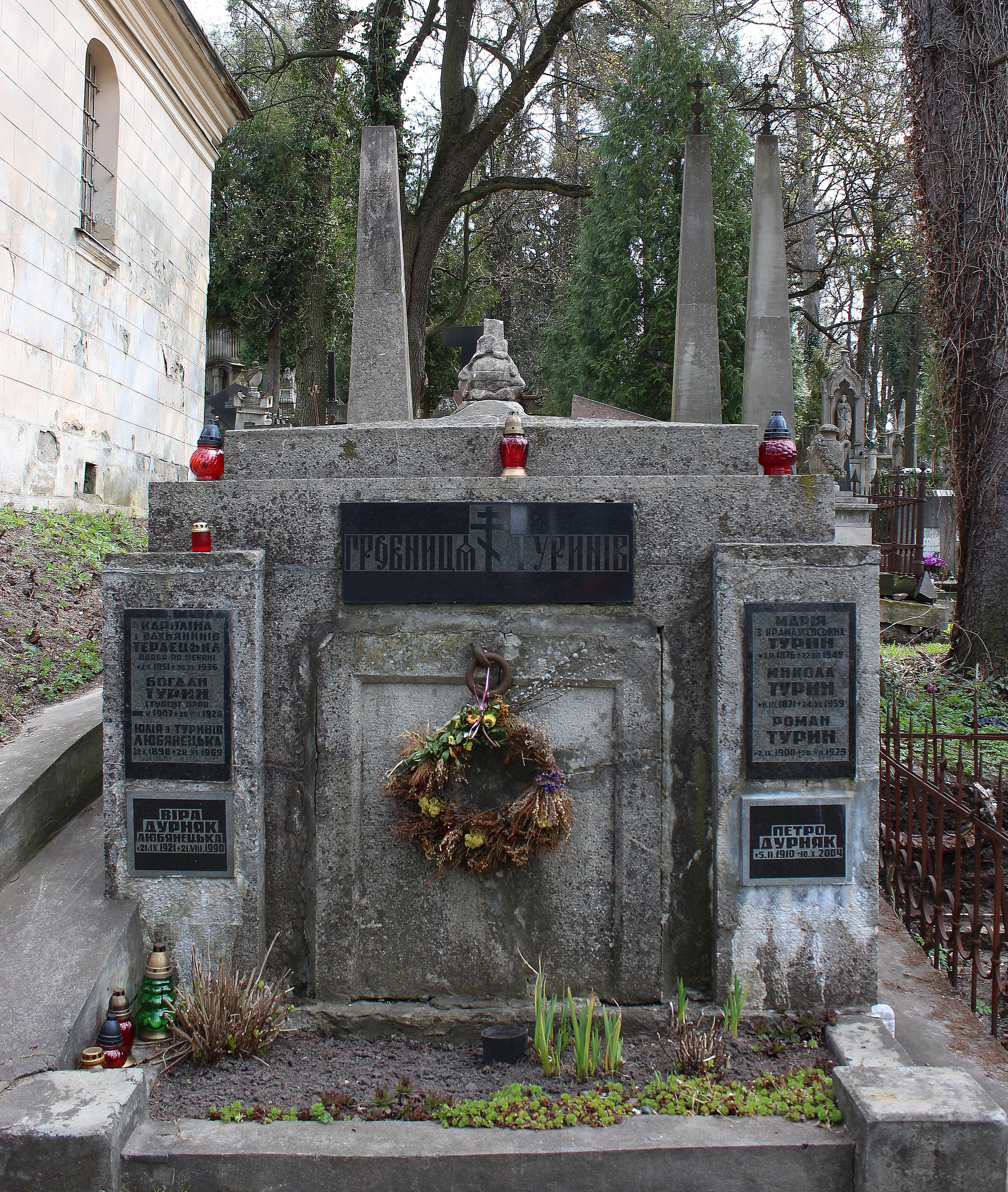

Roman Turyn (Ukrainian: Роман Миколайович Турин; 2 September 1900, Sniatyn, now Ivano-Frankivsk Oblast – 28 July 1979, Lviv) was a Ukrainian painter, portraitist, photo artist, director, and public figure.

== Biography ==
In 1906, he moved to the city of Ternopil. In 1921, he graduated from the classical gymnasium there.

He studied at the Kraków Academy of Fine Arts (1921–1925, under W. Jarocki and Y. Pankevych) and in Paris (1925–1927).

In 1939, he worked in Ternopil, then in the city of Lviv: a research fellow at the Museum of Ukrainian Art, and subsequently, the head of the regional organization of the Union of Artists of the Ukrainian SSR.

He was a co-founder and for 25 years — the director of a children's art school. Roman Turyn was the first to research, collect, and popularize the works of Nikifor Drovnyak from Krynica.

He was one of the first photo artists in Galicia, engaged in photo advertising and photomontage. He studied the art of photography in Paris (his specialized teacher was Maurice Tabard).

He died in Lviv and was buried in the family tomb in Lychakiv Cemetery (field No. 6).

== Creativity ==
Portraits:

- A. Trush-Dragomanova (1946),
- F. Kolessa (1947),
- V. Stefanyk (1948),
- V. Shchurat (1950), and others.

Still lifes, landscapes.

He participated in exhibitions in Kraków, Lviv, Paris, Kharkiv. In 1982 and 2018 — solo (posthumous) exhibitions. Some works are preserved in the collections of the Andrey Sheptytsky National Museum in Lviv and in private collections in Ukraine and Poland.

In December 2018, the Andrey Sheptytsky National Museum of Lviv presented the album "Roman Turyn. Pid yevropeiskym kapeliukhom", authored by Halyna Hronska and Roman Yatsiv.

== Filmography ==
He was the author of documentary films — "Hutsulski frahmenty" and about sports life in Western Ukraine (1933–1935), "Nad Prutom u luzi", and "Kaiakovyi zizd u Warszawi".

== Bibliography ==
- (in Ukrainian) Дуда І., Ониськів М., Турин Роман Миколайович // Ternopil Encyclopedic Dictionary: in 4 v. / editorial board: H. Yavorskyi and other, Ternopil: "Zbruch", 2008, V. 3: П—Я, S. 477. — ISBN 978-966-528-279-2.
- Труш Роман // Енциклопедія українознавства : Словникова частина : [в 11 т.] / Наукове товариство імені Шевченка ; гол. ред. проф., д-р Володимир Кубійович. — Париж — Нью-Йорк : Молоде життя, 1980. — Кн. 2, [т. 9] : Тимошенко — Хмельницький Богдан. — ISBN 5-7707-4049-3.
- Мистецтво України : Біографічний довідник. / упоряд.: А. В. Кудрицький, М. Г. Лабінський ; за ред. А. В. Кудрицького. — Київ : «Українська енциклопедія» імені М. П. Бажана, 1997. — С. 700 с. . — ISBN 5-88500-071-9.
- Роман Турин. Виставка живопису. Проспект. Львів, 1979.
