= Verkhnii Luzhok =

Rural locality in Lviv Oblast, Ukraine

Verkhnii Luzhok Верхній Лужок
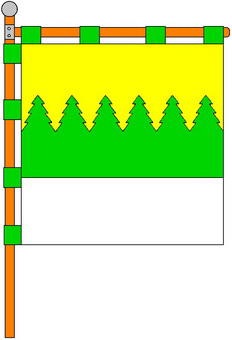
- Flag of Verkhniy Luzhok

- Location in Lviv Oblast Verkhnii Luzhok (Ukraine)
- Coordinates: 49°21′42″N 23°1′5″E
- Country: Ukraine
- Oblast: Lviv Oblast
- Raion: Sambir Raion
- Hromada: Strilky rural hromada
- Time zone: UTC+2 (EET)
  - Summer (DST): UTC+3 (EEST)
- Postal code: 82084

Verkhnii Luzhok (Ukrainian: Верхній Лужок) is a village in the Strilky rural hromada of the Sambir Raion of Lviv Oblast in Ukraine.

== History ==
The first written mention of the village was in 1495.

On 19 July 2020, as a result of the administrative-territorial reform and liquidation of the Staryi Sambir Raion, the village became part of the Sambir Raion.

== Religion ==
- Saint Paraskeva church (1909)

== Notable residents ==
- Hanna-Oksana Lypa (born 1958), Ukrainian decorative and applied arts artist

== Bibliography ==
- "Łużek (4)". Geographical Dictionary of the Kingdom of Poland (in Polish). 5. Warszawa: Kasa im. Józefa Mianowskiego. 1884. p. 836.
