= Liubomyr Medvid =

Ukrainian painter (born 1941)

People's Artist Liubomyr Medvid
- Любомир Медвідь
- Born: 10 July 1941 (age 85); Variazh, Ukrainian SSR, Soviet Union
- Education: Lviv Institute of Applied and Decorative Arts
- Occupations: Painter, graphic artist and teacher
- Awards: People's Artist of Ukraine; Shevchenko National Prize; Order of Prince Yaroslav the Wise

Liubomyr Myroslavovych Medvid (Ukrainian: Любомир Мирославович Медвідь; born 10 July 1941) is a Ukrainian painter. In 1970, he became a member of the National Union of Artists of Ukraine. In 2004, he was elected an academician of the National Academy of Arts of Ukraine.

== Biography ==
He was born on 10 July 1941, in Variazh-misto, now the Variazh Sheptytskyi Raion of Lviv Oblast, Ukraine.

In 1965, he graduated from the Lviv Institute of Applied and Decorative Arts, where he studied with Karlo Zvirynskyi, Vitold Manastyrskyi, and Roman Selskyi. The following year, in 1966, he began working at his Alma mater, where in 1992 he became the head of the Department of Monumental and Decorative Painting, and from 2001 to the present day he has been a professor. In 1970–1988, he also worked at the Lviv Art and Production Plant.

== Creativity ==
He works in the fields of easel and monumental art. In the 1960s, he began to participate in exhibitions. His personal exhibitions were held in Lviv (1972, 1982, 1987, 1990, 1996, 2009, 2011), Kyiv (1972, 1983, 1997), Vilnius (1982), Toronto (1990), Chicago (USA, 1992), Khmelnytskyi (1996), Gdansk (Poland, 1999) and others.

Some of the paintings are kept in the collections of the National Art Museum of Ukraine in Kyiv, the National Museum of Lviv, the Khmelnytsky Art Museum, and others.

Main works:

- panel in the cafe "Pid levom" (1965);
- painting – "Evakuatsiia" (1965), "Druzhyna", "Podolianka" (both — 1969), "S. Liudkevych" (1979), "M. Hohol" (1981; 1986), "Kholodne lito" (1981), "T. Shevchenko" (1983, Lviv Theatre of Opera and Ballet; 1985, University of Lviv), "Lesia Ukrainka", "I. Franko", "T. Shevchenko na Arali", "Avtoportret" (all — 1986), "Skrypal O. Krysa", "Blakytnyi choven. Svitiaz" (both — 1987), "Sukha vesna", "Pisnia, yaku zvychaino spivaiut na voli" (both — 1988), "Pliazh" (1989), "Interventsiia" (1995), "Bludnyi syn" (1996), "Yepyskop Yulian Gbur", "Pivdennyi khrest" (both — 1999);
- cycles — "Peredmistia" (1962–1968), "Evakuatsii" (1964–1968; 1985–1995), "Staryi Lviv", "Emihranty" (both — 1965), "Pershi kolhospy na Lvivshchyni" (1971–72), "Prasloviany", "Povoienna vesna" (both — 1981–1986), "Zemlia i liudy" (1986), "Halychanski doli", "Interiery" (both — 1987), "Roztochchia" (1988–1992), "Prytchi" (1991–1997), "Ecce homo" (1991–2005), "Terra incognita" (1995–2009);
- painted the vicarage icons for St. George's Cathedral of Lviv;

iconostasis of the Ukrainian chapel of the Church of the Body of God in the suburbs of Kraków (Poland);

- нe painted icons, made stained-glass windows, and painted the St. John the Baptist Ukrainian Catholic National Shrine in Ottawa (all in the late 1990s).

== Awards ==
- 1987 – Merited Figure of Arts of Ukraine
- 1991 – 1st prize of the Lviv Biennial of Ukrainian Fine Arts
- 1999 – People's Artist of Ukraine
- 2014 – Shevchenko National Prize
- Order of Prince Yaroslav the Wise 2009 – 5th degree, 2018 – 4th degree
