= Alexander Eremenko =

Alexander Eremenko, also transliterated Yeryomenko, may refer to:

- Alexandre Eremenko (born 1954), Ukrainian-American mathematician
- Alexander Yeryomenko (born 1980), Russian ice hockey player
