= Victor Valentine Eremenko =

Victor Valentine Eremenko from the Institute For Low Temperature Physics, was awarded the status of Fellow in the American Physical Society, after they were nominated by their Forum on International Physics in 2000, for pioneering works in magneto-optics of antiferromagnets, discovery of the ""mixed"" and ""intermediate"" states of antiferromagnets near magnetic phase transitions, photoinduced persistent phenomena in magnetic insulators & high-Tc superconductors; and his international activities as the editor of ""Low Temperature"".

== See also ==
- List of fellows of the American Physical Society (1998–2010)
