= Yamnytsia rural hromada =

Hromada in Ivano-Frankivsk Oblast, Ukraine

Yamnytsia rural hromada Ямницька сільська громада
- hromada
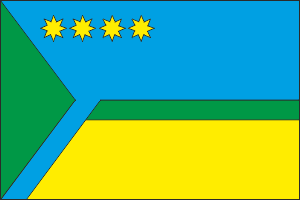
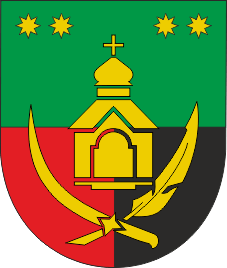
- Flag Seal

- Location within Ivano-Frankivsk Oblast Location within Ukraine
- Coordinates: 48°58′57″N 24°42′22″E
- Country: Ukraine
- Oblast: Ivano-Frankivsk Oblast
- Raion: Ivano-Frankivsk Raion
- Administrative center: Yamnytsia

Area
  - Total: 7,609 km^{2} (2,938 sq mi)

Population (2018)
  - Total: 7,897
- Villages: 8
- Website: yamnytsia-rada.gov.ua

Yamnytsia rural hromada (Ukrainian: Ямницька сільська громада) is a hromada in Ukraine, in Ivano-Frankivsk Raion of Ivano-Frankivsk Oblast. The administrative center is the village of Yamnytsia.

== Settlements ==
The hromada consists of 8 villages:

- Yamnytsia
- Pavlivka
- Silets
- Tiaziv
- Rybne
- Maidan
- Nova Huta
- Tsenzhiv
