= Yevhen Lysyk =

Ukrainian theater artist (1930–1991)

People's Painter Yevhen Lysyk
- Євген Лисик
- Born: 21 September 1930; Sznyrów, Poland
- Died: 4 May 1991 (aged 60); Lviv, Ukraine
- Education: Lviv Institute of Applied and Decorative Arts
- Occupation: Theater artist
- Awards: Shevchenko National Prize, People's Painter of the Ukrainian SSR

Yevhen Mykytovych Lysyk (Ukrainian: Євген Микитович Лисик; 21 September 1930 – 4 May 1991) was a Ukrainian theater artist. He was the husband of costume designer Oksana Zinchenko. The artist Hanna Lysyk is his son.

== Biography ==
He was born on 21 September 1930 in Shnyriv (now Zolochiv Raion, Lviv Oblast, Ukraine) into a peasant family. He lost his mother early, and the boy was raised by his father and grandfather. In 1937, he began his studies at the local elementary school. Together with his father, he attended the village theater, which was located in the People's House.

Lysyk studied at the Lviv Institute of Applied and Decorative Arts (a student of Roman Selskyi). He was expelled from the institute in 1959 at the height of the anti-abstractionist campaign. He was reinstated a year later, but ideological pressure on the artist continued. In 1961, he completed his studies. From that same year, he worked at the Lviv Opera and Ballet Theater (from 1967 – chief artist). In 1967, he became a laureate of the O. Havryliuk Prize. In 1971, he was awarded the Shevchenko National Prize. In 1975, he received the title of People's Painter of Ukrainian SSR. He designed about 100 stage sets.

He died on 4 May 1991, in Lviv. He is buried in Lychakiv Cemetery, field No. 67. In 2005, a monument by sculptor Roman Petruk and architect Kostiantyn Prysiazhnyi was erected on his grave.

== Honoring ==
Since 1992, students at Lviv Polytechnic have created a series of experimental projects for the "Lysyk House" – an exhibition space for preserving and displaying the artist's artistic heritage.

From 19 January to 9 March 2025, the Center of Intellectual Art Mercury in Lviv hosted the exhibition project "Lysyk", dedicated to the Ukrainian artist-stage designer Yevhen Lysyk. This was the first large-scale exhibition to comprehensively present Lysyk's work as a theater artist. The center's team gathered a vast collection of the artist's output in one location: installations, models for performances, photographs, costume sketches, and scenographies.

== Bibliography ==
- Lysyk Yevhen Mykytovych / I. S. Dychenko // Encyclopedia of Modern Ukraine [Online] / Eds. : I. М. Dziuba, A. I. Zhukovsky, M. H. Zhelezniak [et al.] ; National Academy of Sciences of Ukraine, Shevchenko Scientific Society. – Kyiv : The NASU institute of Encyclopedic Research, 2016.
- Диченко І. С. Євген Лисик. Нарис про життя і творчість. Київ, Мистецтво, 1978.
- Лисик Євген Микитови // Українська музична енциклопедія / Гол. редкол. Г. Скрипник. – Київ : ІМФЕ НАНУ, 2011. – Т. 3 : [Л – М]. – С. 129-130.
- Лисик Євген Микитович // Словник художників України / відпов. ред. М. П. Бажан. – Київ : Головна редакція Української радянської енциклопедії, 1973. – С. 133.
- Лисик Євген Микитович // Митці України : Енциклопедичний довідник. / упоряд. : М. Г. Лабінський, В. С. Мурза ; за ред. А. В. Кудрицького. – Київ : «Українська енциклопедія» імені М. П. Бажана, 1992. – С. 848 с. . – ISBN 5-88500-042-5. – С. 361.
- Лисик Євген Микитович // Мистецтво України : Біографічний довідник. / упоряд.: А. В. Кудрицький, М. Г. Лабінський ; за ред. А. В. Кудрицького. – Київ : «Українська енциклопедія» імені М. П. Бажана, 1997. – С. 700 с. . – ISBN 5-88500-071-9. – С. 367.
- Проскуряков В. Феномен Лисика // Галицька брама. – № 8. – 1995. – С. 8—9.
- Шевченківські лауреати 1962—2001: Енциклопедичний довідник. – К., 2001. – С. 295—296.
- Шнирів: погляд крізь віки / Упорядник Василь Макар. – Броди, 2006. – 132 с.

=== Other books ===
- Творчість Є. М. Лисика в часі, просторі, сценографії та архітектурі / В. І. Проскуряков, З. В. Климко, О. К. Зінченко. – Львів: Видавництво Львівської політехніки, 2016. – 136 с. – ISBN 978-966-941-008-5.
- Денис Гугнин Діалог у просторі та часі. – Львів: Простір-М, 2023. 144 с., іл. ISBN 978-617-8055-82-0
- Денис Гугнин Філософія функціонуючої культури в роботах Євгена Лисика. – Львів: Простір-М, 2024. 108 с., іл.
