= Ilya Yeryomenko =

Russian footballer

Personal information
- Full name: Ilya Vladimirovich Yeryomenko
- Date of birth: 24 November 1998 (age 27)
- Place of birth: Omsk, Russia
- Height: 1.90 m (6 ft 3 in)
- Position: Goalkeeper

Senior career*
| Years | Team | Apps | (Gls) |
| 2016–2021 | FC Irtysh Omsk | 50 | (0) |
| 2022–2023 | FC Irtysh Omsk | 1 | (0) |
| 2024 | FC Irtysh Omsk | 0 | (0) |
- * Club domestic league appearances and goals as of 8 June 2024

Ilya Vladimirovich Yeryomenko (Russian: Илья Владимирович Ерёменко; born 24 November 1998) is a Russian football player.

== Club career ==
He made his debut in the Russian Football National League for FC Irtysh Omsk on 1 August 2020 in a game against FC Yenisey Krasnoyarsk, as a starter.
