= Alexei Eremenko (disambiguation) =

Alexei Eremenko is a transliteration of a Slavic name (Russian: Алексей Ерёменко). Alternatives for the given name are Aleksey, Aleksei and Alexey and for the last name are Yeryomenko, Eryomenko or Yeremenko. It may refer to:

- Alexei Eremenko (born 1983), Russian-Finnish association football player
- Aleksei Borisovich Yeryomenko (born 1964), Russian-Finnish association football player, father of Alexei Eremenko
- Aleksei Gordeyevich Yeryomenko Kombat (1906–1942), Soviet military officer pictured in a famous World War II photograph
