= Nikolai Yeremenko =

Nikolai Yeremenko may refer to:

- Nikolai Yeremenko Jr. (1949–2001), Soviet-Belarusian actor
- Nikolai Yeremenko Sr. (1926–2000), Soviet-Belarusian actor
