= Roman Yatsiv =

Ukrainian painter, art historian and educator (born 1956)

- Роман Миронович Яців
- Born: 26 August 1956 (age 70); Khodoriv, Lviv Oblast (now Ukraine)
- Education: Lviv Institute of Applied and Decorative Arts
- Occupations: Painter; art historian; educator
- Awards: Merited Culture Worker of Ukraine; Sviatoslav Hordynskyi Prize

Roman Yatsiv (Ukrainian: Роман Миронович Яців; born 26 August 1956) is a Ukrainian painter, art historian and educator. He is a Candidate of Art History, a Doctor of Historical Sciences, and a professor. Member of the Union of Artists "Club of Ukrainian Artists" from 1989 and the Lviv organization of the Union of Artists of Ukraine from 1992, and is a full member of the Shevchenko Scientific Society. He has been an Merited Culture Worker of Ukraine from 2006 and received the Sviatoslav Hordynskyi Prize for 2008.

== Biography ==
He was born on 26 August 1956, in the city of Khodoriv (now Stryi Raion, Lviv Oblast, Ukraine). He is the son of graphic artist Myron Yatsiv. From 1973 to 1978, he studied at the Department of Interior and Furniture Design at the Lviv Institute of Applied and Decorative Arts, where his teachers included Myron Yatsiv, Karlo Zvirynskyi, Yurii Skandakov, Mykhailo Kurylych, Volodymyr Ostrovskyi, Teofil Maksysko, Volodymyr Ovsiichuk, Stepan Koropchak, and Danylo Dovboshynskyi.

He served in the Soviet Army and, after being discharged from the reserves in December 1979, worked in Lviv, first as a junior research fellow at the State Museum of Ukrainian Art, and later as acting head of the Soviet Art Department. In 1984, he moved to the Lviv branch of the Rylsky Institute of Art Studies, Folklore and Ethnology, where he began systematic scientific research of Visual arts of Ukraine. In 1994, based on his monograph "Lviv Graphics of the 1945–1990s: Traditions and Innovation", he defended his Candidate's dissertation. At the same time, from 1991 to 1993, he held the position of editor-in-chief of the journal "Mystetski Studii".

From 1994 to 2007, he served as deputy director for Scientific Work at the Institute of Ethnology of the National Academy of Sciences of Ukraine, and has been an docent from 2003. Simultaneously, from 1995, he has been the executive secretary of the journal "Narodoznavchi Zoshyty". From 2007 to 2021, he was the Vice-Rector for Scientific Work at the Lviv National Academy of Arts, and from September 2021, he has been a professor at the Department of Artistic Woodwork. At the same time, from 2009, he has been the executive secretary of the journal "Mystetskyy Uzhyinok". He resided in Lviv at 56 Drahomanova Street, apartment 9, and at 9 Mykoly Voronoho Street, apartment 3.

== Creativity ==
He works in the fields of easel painting, easel and book graphics, and photo art, using the techniques of oil and acrylic painting, gouache, and drawing with markers and felt-tip pens.

He has participated in art exhibitions, including solo ones and artistic photography exhibitions. Solo exhibitions were held in Ukraine: in Lviv in 1981, 1989, 1996, 1997, 2005, 2009, 2015, 2020, 2022; Rivne in 2013, 2019; Drohobych in 2015; Kramatorsk in 2015; Druzhkivka, Bakhmut, Kyiv, and Odesa in 2016; Lutsk in 2020; and Kolomyia in 2021. Abroad: in Poland in Łódź in 2015, 2019, and Poznań in 2019; and in Canada in Toronto in 2017.

He was a member of the international jury for the "Srebrny Czworokąt" exhibition in Przemyśl in 2015, 2018, 2021–2022, and the curator of an exhibition of works by Lviv painters in Hangzhou in 2011.

The artist's works are held in private collections in Ukraine, Germany, Canada, and the USA.

== Works ==
He began publishing in April 1980 with a review of a solo exhibition by the Uzhhorod painter Volodymyr Mykyta. Since then, he has published exhibition reviews, essays, critiques, and articles in Kyiv and Lviv periodicals. In his early publications, he devoted a lot of attention to the contemporary art process, exhibitions, and museum work.

In the late 1980s, he focused on researching issues related to the study of Ukrainian modernism and the works of Ukrainian diaspora artists. He was one of the first among Ukrainian art historians to prepare publications about artists such as Pavlo Kovzhun, Robert Lisovskyi, Edward Kozak, Sviatoslav Hordynskyi, Ivan Ivanets, Halia Mazurenko, and Petro Andrusiv, organizing (in co-authorship) exhibitions for some of them in Lviv.

He is the author of over 700 scientific and popular science publications, including a number of his own monographs and albums, such as:

- "Lvivska Hrafika 1945–1990-kh Rokiv: Tradytsii i Novatorstvo" (1992);
- "Myttsi Suchasnosti" (1998);
- "Myron Yatsiv (1929–1996). Zhyttia i Tvorchist" (2000);
- "Ukrainske Mystetstvo XX Stolittia: Idei, Yavyshcha, Materialy: Zbirnyk Statei" (2006);
- "Oleksa Shatkivskyi ta Ukrainskyi Mystetskyi Hurtok 'Spokii'" (2008);
- "Skulptor Emmanuil Mysko: Svitlo Doli" (2009);
- "Pavlo Maksymovych Kovzhun. 1896–1939: Biobibliohrafichnyi Dovidnyk" (2010, co-author);
- "Liubomyr Roman Kuzma (1913–2004): Maliarska i Publitsystychna Spadshchyna" (2010);
- "Ukrainski Mystetski Vystavky u Lvovi (1919–1939): Dovidnyk, Antolohiia Mystetsko-Krytychnoi Dumky" (2011);
- "Idei, Smysly, Interpretatsii Obrazotvorchoho Mystetstva: Ukrainska Teoretychna Dumka XX Stolittia" (in four parts, 2012, 2019, 2021–2022);
- "Olenka Gerdan-Zaklynska: Biohrafichnyi Narys" (2013);
- "Roman Chornyi, Mystetska Lehenda Lvova" (2014);
- "Olenka Gerdan-Zaklynska (1916–1999): Zhyttia u Mystetstvi" (2015);
- "Robert Lisovskyi (1893–1982): Dukh Linii" (2015);
- "Zoya Lisovska: Dzherela Prystasti: Maliarstvo, Hrafika" (2018);
- "Roman Turyn (1900–1979). Pid Yevropeyskym Kapeliukhom: Albom-monohrafiia" (2018);
- "Petro Hrehoryichuk: Zhyttia i Tvorchist" (2018);
- "Ivan Ivanets (1893–1946): Strileksi Memuary, Tvorcha Spadshchyna" (2019);
- "Yevhen Dzyndra (1913–1983): Rizbleni Stezhyny Zhyttia" (2020);
- "Mala Khronolohiia Mystetskykh Podii i Pam'iatnykh Dat XX Stolittia: Ukraina — Svit" (2021).

Author of a series of articles for the Encyclopedia of Modern Ukraine.
