= Oleg Minko =

Ukrainian painter (1938–2013)

- Born: Oleg Terentiyovych Minko; 3 August 1938; Makiivka, Donetsk Oblast, Ukrainian SSR, Soviet Union
- Died: 20 November 2013 (aged 75); Lviv, Ukraine
- Education: Lviv National Academy of Arts
- Known for: Painting
- Movement: Realism · Expressionism
- Spouse: Olha Minko (m. 1959)
- Awards: Honoured Artist of Ukraine (1972), People's Artist of Ukraine (2009)

Oleg Terentiyovych Minko (Ukrainian: Олéг Терéнтійович Мінькó; August 3, 1938 – November 20, 2013) was a Ukrainian painter and art teacher, belonging to the Lviv school of artistic expression. He was awarded the rank of 'Honoured Artist Of Ukraine' by the state and was considered to be one of the most established and rated artists in the country.

== Early life and education ==
Minko was born in Makiivka, Donetsk Oblast, Ukrainian SSR. During World War II, Minko's family moved to the Nosachi village in Cherkassy Oblast, where Minko's father came from. In 1944, they returned to Makiivka. His mother Antonina Andriivna worked as an accountant in the "Makiivbud" trust. His father Terentiy Ivanovych was an economist in the machine shop at the Makiivka Metallurgical Plant. After school, Oleg graduated from the Makiivka metallurgical technical training school.

From early childhood, Oleg loved to draw and dreamed of becoming a painter. According to his family history, Oleg's great grandfather was an icon painter.

In 1959, Oleg Minko enrolled into the Department of artistic weaving at the Lviv State Institute of Applied and Decorative Arts (now Lviv National Academy of Arts). His professors were the painters Roman Selskyi and Carlo Zvirynskyi.

== Career ==
After graduating in 1965, he worked as a weaving shop foreman in the Lviv Art-Production Enterprise; within five years, he became the head of that shop. From 1971 to 1982, he worked as a painter of the monumental shop of the Lviv Art-Production Enterprise. From 1982 until his death in 2013, Minko worked as senior professor and head of the sub-department of artistic tapestry at the Lviv State Institute of Applied and Decorative Arts.

== Personal life and death ==
Minko married Olha Minko (a former weaver) in 1959. His daughter Iryna Minko-Muraschyk is an artist who works with pastels and small format tapestry.

On 20 November 2013, Minko died in Lviv.

== Artworks ==
Minko's early works took the form of minimal abstract paintings. One of his first abstract compositions, "Grav karty" (The Card Play), was painted in 1961. Abstraction (1963–1965) gave Minko complete freedom in his searches for the unknown. The works "Zamkova sparynka" (The Keyhole), "Chorna maska" (The Black Mask), "Pechera" (The Cave), "Chorni pryamokutnyky" (The Black Rectangles), "Misiachne siayvo" (The Moonlight) and "Kompozytsia z priamokutnykiv" (The Composition Of Rectangles) are precisely measured works with a severe and ascetic feel to them. The colours in these works are mostly dark, consisting of blacks, greys, browns, deep blues and bronzes. Minko's abstract painting stage continued until 1965. He then started looking for a new way of expressing his emotions, leading him to a new style of painting which he (out of convenience) called figurative painting.

From 1967 to 1969, he created a series of works entitled "Zhyttia masok" (The Life of Masks). During this period, historical and social subjects became the main focus of his creative research. He experimented with the human figure within the pictorial space of his paintings and, through the use of symbolism, tried to express his outrage at what he perceived was wrong in the then-communist, totalitarian government he lived under. Through this approach, he created a new series of works between 1968 and 1972:

- "Nostalhiya" (Nostalgia)
- "Bil"(The Pain)
- "Lyudyna z yablukom (Illuzionist)" (The Man with an apple (The Illusionist))
- "Kryk" (The Scream)
- "Bezgluzdia"(Nonsense)

=== Period of silence (1970–1978) ===
From approximately 1970 until 1978, the artist lived through a prolonged creative depression, which he referred to as his "period of silence". This period was triggered by long-lasting psychological stress, which was further aggravated by his friends' arrests, being tracked, being constantly called in for interrogation by the KGB, being secretly prohibited from exhibiting his works, and general aggravation of the situation within the totalitarian society in which he lived.

In 1970, Minko became a member of the Painters' Association.

During this period, his work took on a new emphasis on historical subjects. Several of his paintings praised Cossack times and mourned fallen heroes:

- "Kosak"
- "Smert koshovogo" (The Chieftain's Death)
- "Stepom" (By Step)
- "Poema pro davniy step" (The Tale of the Old Step)

These pieces show the artist's preoccupation with national and traditional aspects of Ukrainian culture and history at the time, including an understanding of history and Cossack times, pain for Ukraine's fate, prophesies for the future, and concern for the present. Later, after his creative crisis that lasted for almost eight years was over, these series of works would get a continuation in the works "Trypillya", "Banduryst", "Kniaz Sviatoslav", "Pamyat dida" (The Grandfather Memory) and "Prorok" (The Prophet). Considered particularly striking is "Smert koshovogo" (The Chieftain's Death), which is part of the Lviv Art Gallery's collection.

1978 signalled a new creative period in his life, where he underwent a kind of rebirth and unique catharsis.

=== Periods of artwork ===
The artist's work can be divided into three phases:

==== First period (1960–1972) ====
This period was considered by art critics to be the most powerful. The series of abstract works under the general name "Compositions" and the series "Life of the Masks" were an affirmation of the emergence of an original artist who tried to escape an oppressive socialist regime. Oleg Minko himself considers "Compositions" and "Life of the Masks" to be the turning point to his artwork.

==== Second period (1980–late 1980s) ====
This period was one of romantic realism, when, according to Minko himself, he was relearning how to paint. During this period, he worked on a series of landscapes and portraits. Artistic images were lyrically constructed by his romantically-philosophical outlook. This phase in his work began with the completion of the painting "The Daughter's Portrait" in 1980.

In 1981, Minko, alongside two other famous painters from Lviv—Zenoviy Flinta and Lyubomyr Medvid—exhibited works at the Lviv Picture Gallery. "The Exhibition of three" ("Vystavka triokh") was described as "a sip of pure spring water" in the artistic environment.

After the success of this exhibition (not only in Lviv, but also in Kyiv, Vilnius and Moscow), Minko, Flinta and Medvid were awarded the rank of "Honoured Artists of Ukraine".

==== Third period (late 1980s–early 1990s) ====
A "returning to the origins" started in the late 1980s and lasted into the early 1990s. Minko, having developed his mature artistic style, finally felt he could properly express himself, drawing on his world outlook, internal experiences and visual language. He brought new elements and unique formal solutions to his works, creating an original world where his characters existed in the past, present and future, either simultaneously or in parallel dimensions.

In 1989, he created a series in the subjective-figurative style, which included the following works:

- "Perestoroga" (The Warning)
- "Staryi z palytseiu" (The Old Man with a Cane)
- "Vidchay" (Despair)

The key element in Minko's work through the years is the image of Man and his fate. He raises philosophical questions about birth, the meaning of life, and our role in the universe. In the works "Bil" (Pain), "Nostalgiya" (Nostalgy), "Muky" (Passions), "Pokayannya" (Repentance), "Dvi postati" (Two Figures), "Zemnni muky" (Earthly Passions), "Bila postat" (The White Figure), "Odkrovennya" (Revelation), "Liudyna I yahnia" (The Human and the Sheep), "Khymery" (The Chimeras), "Divchyna z ptakhom" (The Girl with a Bird), "Vershnyk" (The Rider), "Cholovik u krisli" (The Man in a Chair) and others, Minko examines the drama and tragedy of life, emphasized by the use of a darker palette of colours and shades.

Minko’s paintings frequently depicted a mysterious white figure. This figure is typical of his expressionist explorations: "Postat i bili kaly" (The Figure and White Calla Lilies), "Ogolena v lisi" (The Nude in the Forest), "Bila postat" (The White Figure) and "Snig u lisi" (Snow in the Woods). These deformed female—or sometimes androgynous—figures were symbols of women, fate, Ukraine, and even death.

=== 1995 works ===
- "Kit i piven" (The Cat and the Rooster)
- "Synia golova" (The Blue Head)
- "Naliakanyy kin" (The Scared Hoarse)
- "Zhinochyi portret z babkoyu" (The Female Portrait with a Damselfly)
- "Ptashynyi spiv" (Bird Singing)
- "Portret iz zelenym lystkom" (Portrait with a Green Leave)
- "Tryvoga" (The Anxiety)
- "Zhinka, yaka yde po ozeru" (The Woman Walking the Lake)
- "Rozmova" (The Talk)
- "Mandruyuchi" (The Wandering)
- "Velyki hmary nad ozerom" (The Big Clouds over the Lake)
- "Metelyk na pliazhi" (The Butterfly on the Beach)
- "Piven" (The Rooster)
- "Divchyna z ptahom" (The Girl with a Bird)

These paintings explore themes of reality and mysticism, attempting to sink into the mystery of the ulterior world and bizarre life situations—a Ukrainian metaphysical world created by Minko.

=== 2000 ===
In the textbook for high school students Osnovy estetyky (The Essentials of Aesthetics), published in Kyiv, Minko was named next to expressionists such as Norwegian artist Edvard Munch, French artist Georges Rouault, Austrian expressionist Arnulf Rainer, and surrealist painters Jules Breton, Salvador Dalí and René Magritte. "It's worthwhile mentioning that an expressionist world outlook has always been an inherent quality of the Ukrainian national consciousness. In particular, works of the Lviv artist Oleg Minko "Vidchay" (The Despair), "Movchannia" (The Silence), "Perestoroga" (The Warning) – are a new step in the development of the "Slavic branch of European expressionism",” authors L. Levchuk and O. Onyshenko state in their book.

=== 2009 ===
This year marked 50 years worth of artworks as Minko continued to work as a painter and a professor. He started work on a new series called "Znykli tsyvilizazii" (The Lost Civilizations), which featured motifs that expressed the artist's existential emotions towards the future of humanity.
