= Zenovii Flinta =

Ukrainian ceramic artist, painter, graphic artist (1935–1988)

- Зеновій Флінта
- Born: 1 September 1935; Toky (now Ternopil Raion, Ternopil Oblast, Ukraine)
- Died: 2 April 1988 (aged 52); Lviv
- Education: Lviv Ivan Trush School of Applied Arts, Lviv State Institute of Applied and Decorative Arts
- Occupations: Ceramic artist, painter, graphic artist
- Awards: Merited Painter of the Ukrainian SSR

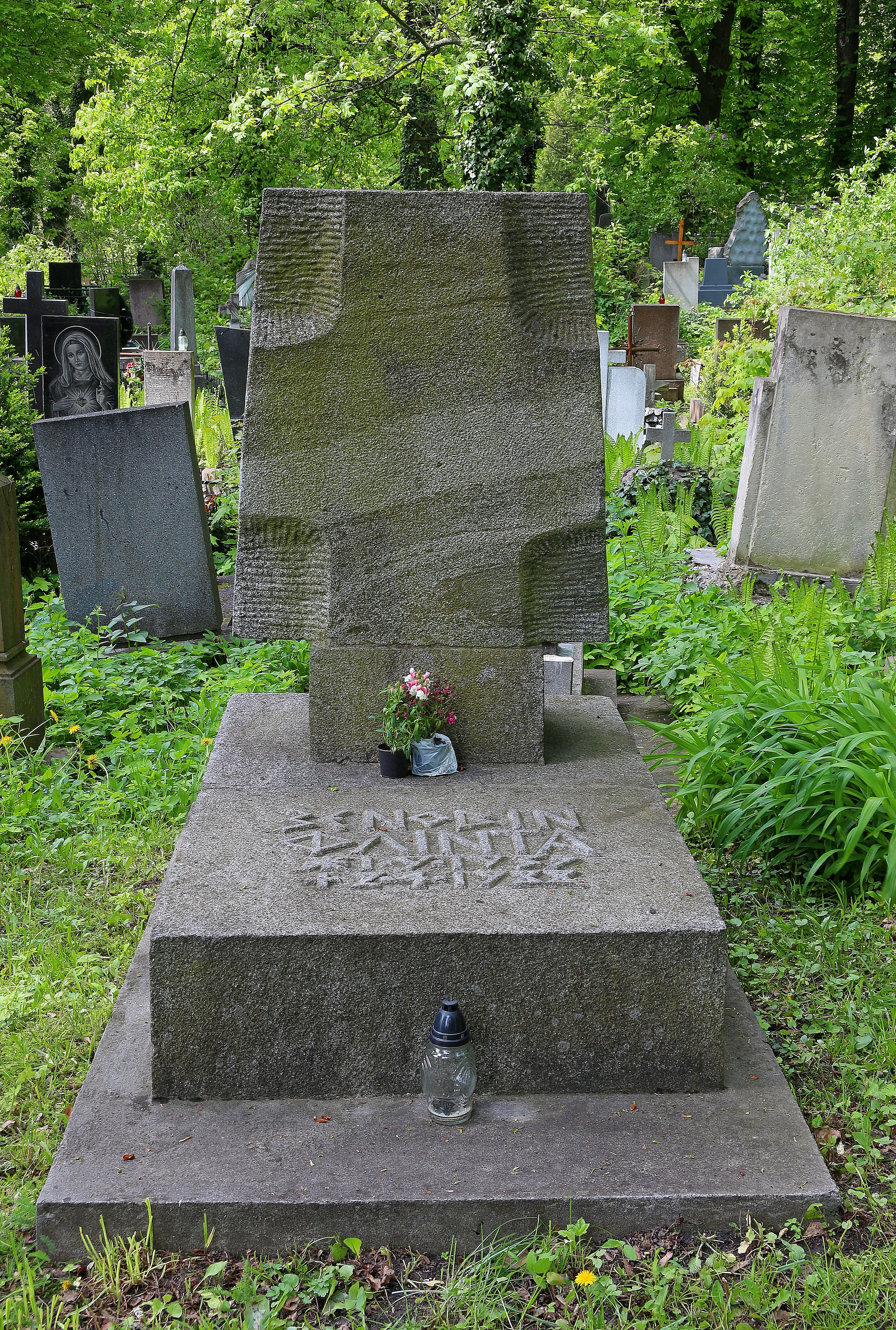
Zenoviy Flinta's grave in Lychakiv Cemetery, Lviv

Zenovii Flinta (Ukrainian: Зеновій Флінта; 1 September 1935 – 2 April 1988) was a Ukrainian ceramic artist, painter, graphic artist. Member of the Union of Artists of Ukraine.

== Biography ==
Zenovii Flinta was born on 1 September 1935 in Toky (now Ternopil Raion, Ternopil Oblast, Ukraine). He graduated from a seven-year school in his native village in 1950.

He entered the Lviv Ivan Trush School of Applied Arts, Department of Decorative Painting. He graduated in 1959. In 1959–1963, he studied at the Lviv State Institute of Applied and Decorative Arts, Department of Art Ceramics. From 1963, Flinta taught at the Department of Painting at the Ivan Trush Lviv School of Applied Arts, and then from 1965 to 1975, Flinta worked as a teacher of ceramics at the Lviv State Institute of Applied and Decorative Arts. In 1967, he completed an internship at the Gdańsk Academy of Fine Arts, and in 1968 – at the Warsaw, Kraków, and Wrocław Academies of Fine Arts.

Since 1970, Flinta's life has been divided between the institute, the ceramics and sculpture factory, the Artists' Union, his workshop, and home. In 1971, Flinta became the head of the decorative and applied arts section of the Lviv branch of the Union of Artists of Ukraine.

The artist's works began to be exhibited at republican exhibitions starting in 1960, and eight years later, at all-Union exhibitions. He participated in International Biennales of Ceramics in Faenza (Italy, 1973) and Vallauris (France, 1974). A group exhibition of three friends – Oleh Minko, Zenovii Flinta, and Liubomyr Medvid – had immense success in Lviv, Kyiv, and Vilnius in 1982–1983. In 1985, a solo exhibition of Flinta's works, featuring painting, graphics, and ceramics, took place in Lviv.

In the mid-1970s, when the Lviv Experimental Ceramic and Sculptural Factory was producing souvenir runs, Flinta created an author's series of ceramic plates with Lviv landscapes using enamel painting techniques, demonstrating his ability to avoid the tempting allure of "kitsch" in mass production. In the second half of the 1970s, a distinctive style of "genre action" matured in the artist's work, where the meticulously perfected form of graphic drawings of portraits, landscapes, or still lifes was combined with a collage of prospective plans from other compositions: "Podillia. Zhnyva", "Avtoportret z Horlytseiu", "Melodii Bakha", "Peizazh z Makamy", and others.

In the years 1970–1980, together with Andrii Bokotei, Frants Cherniak, and Roman Petruk, he executed a number of monumental objects in modern style using glass and ceramics.

He died on 2 April 1988, in Lviv and is buried along a side alley in field No. 21 of Lychakiv Cemetery. A monument, made in the workshop of master stonemason S. Medynsky, was erected on his grave according to the design of sculptor Roman Petruk and architect Kostiantyn Prysiazhny.

== Creativity ==
The Sixtiers movement and the work of Roman Selskyi significantly influenced the artist's creativity. In painting, the artist preferred pastels and tempera. In ceramics, he paid special attention to the technology of painting, achieving picturesque and graphic effects. He most often worked with ceramic forms that had large surfaces for painting—decorative plates and panels. The artist's early works are characterized by the use of ornamental motifs composed of elements inherent in the folk art of the Prykarpattia. The color palette is most often represented by a combination of brown, green, and ochre colors, although a striking contrast of black and white is sometimes added. In three-dimensional ceramic works, Zenovii Flinta primarily focused on color, while plastic modeling served as a relief background for the painting.

=== Works ===
- Decorative plate (1969). Decorative elements are composed non-traditionally – cells are formed based on the intersection of vertical and horizontal lines. They are filled with stylized images of trees, animals, birds, and fish. The plate is made in white, yellow, gray-green, and brown colors.
- Decorative plate "Ryba" (1972). Color plays the main role in resolving the artistic image. The work is executed in a rich color scheme—the image is applied in yellow and gray-green on a red background. Relief modeling is used to enhance the emotional impact.
- Decorative panel "Soniashnyky" (1973)
- Painted plaques "Lviv" (1974).
- Decorative plate "Derevo i Ptakhy" (1974).
- Decorative plate "Kvity" (1974).
- Decorative panel "Narodni Motyvy" (1974).
- Decorative panel "Buksyr" (1974).
- Decorative plate "Maky" (1976).
- Triptych "Chudovyi Sad" (1976). The work is based on three large plates with a wavy concentric relief. They are painted diagonally with images of stems, branches, and fruits. The combination of the diagonal composition of the painting with the relief creates an illusion of movement.
- Plate "Yabluka" (1976).
- Ceramic cladding for the restaurant "Lviv" (1977). The work was created in co-authorship with Andrii Bokotei and Vasyl Kondratiuk. The masonry of square ceramic blocks creates a rhythmic division of the plane vertically. The painting – wavy stripes of blue-green color – is done horizontally.
- Decorative panel "Kvitucha Zemlia" for the house of culture in Ushkovychi, Lviv Oblast (1978).
- Three-dimensional spatial composition "Storinky Istorii Lvova" (1979). The work consists of three large chamotte plates. They are modeled in the form of parchment scrolls. The volumetric elements are decorated with a panorama of the old and new city. The image is outlined along the contour with a thin relief line. The author used toning with ocher-brown shades to enhance the sound.
- Modular lattice for the winter garden of the sanatorium "Pivdennyi" in Truskavets (1979). Created in co-authorship with Andrii Bokotei and Vasyl Kondratiuk.
- Decorative panel "Narodne Zodchestvo" (1985).
- Decorative panel "Arkhitekturni Pamiatky Lvova" (1985–1986). The painting is done with colored slip and viscous enamels. The image is devoid of excessive detail. The main expressive means is color.

== Family ==
In 1959, Flinta married Hanna Pazdrii. In 1960, their daughter Iryna was born (now a Ukrainian artistic textile master, Merited Artist of Ukraine). In 1969, their son Andrii was born.

== Honoring ==
In 1993, a street in Lviv was named in honor of Zenovii Flinta.

On the occasion of Zenovii Flinta's 70th birthday, a memorial plaque was unveiled on 8 September 2005, on the building at 10 Barvinskykh Street, where he lived from 1965 to 1985. On the same day, the exhibition "Lviv Through the Eyes of Zenovii Flinta" opened at the "Herdan" gallery at 4 Ruska Street in Lviv.

== Bibliography ==
- Голубець, О. М. (1991). Львівська кераміка. Київ: Наукова думка. p. 120. ISBN 5-12-001785-1.
- Флінта Зиновій Петрович // Кераміка України. — Київ : Логос Україна, 2009. — С. 110. — ISBN 978-966-1581-04-2.
- Флінта Зиновій Петрович // Львівська національна академія мистецтв оригінал =. — Київ : Логос Україна, 2011. — С. 22—23.
- Магеровський О. Т. Аспекти творчих пошуків Зиновія Флінти // Вісник ХДАДМ. — 2010. — № 1. — С. 135—137.
- (in Ukrainian) І. Дуда, В. Стецько, Флінта Зеновій Петрович // Ternopil Encyclopedic Dictionary: in 4 v. / editorial board: H. Yavorskyi and other, Ternopil: "Zbruch", 2008, V. 3: П—Я, S. 522. — ISBN 978-966-528-279-2.
- Флінта Зиновій Петрович // Універсальний словник-енциклопедія. — 4-те вид. — К. : Теза, 2006.
- Грицевич І. Віра в красу, добро та працю: Рання творчість Зеновія Флінти / І. Грицевич // Дзвін. — 2007. — № 1. — С. 110-112.
- Загайська, Р. (2017). Вітер в долонях: Книга проходів Личаківським цвинтарем. Львів: Апріорі. p. 416. ISBN 978-617-629-367-5.
- Любомир Медвідь, Олег Мінько, Зеновій Флінта: Альбом / Автор-упорядник О. Жирко-Козинкевич. — Київ : Мистецтво, 1992. — 208 с. — (Художники Львова)
