= Orest Holubets =

Ukrainian art historian (born 1954)

- Орест Михайлович Голубець
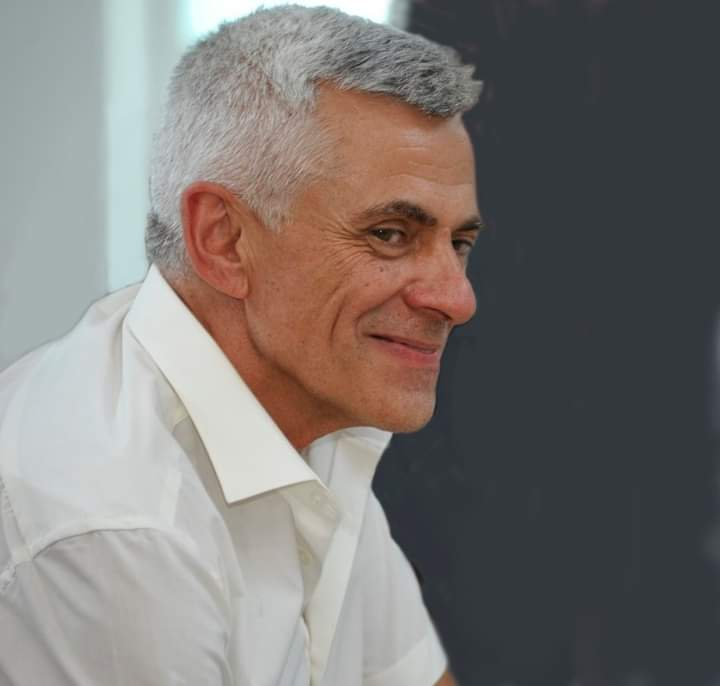
- Born: 25 October 1954 (age 71); Lviv (now Ukraine)
- Education: Lviv State Institute of Applied and Decorative Arts
- Occupation: Art historian

Orest Holubets (Ukrainian: Орест Михайлович Голубець; born 25 October 1954), is a Ukrainian art historian, Professor of the Department of Design and Architecture Fundamentals at the Institute of Architecture, Lviv Polytechnic and Head of the Department of Art Ceramics at the Lviv National Academy of Arts, Doctor of Arts (2003), Academician (2021), Corresponding Member (2017) of the National Academy of Arts of Ukraine. Member of the National Union of Artists of Ukraine (1986). Member of the editorial boards of the national scientific yearbook "Ukrainska Keramolohia" (2001–2002) and the Ukrainian Ceramics Journal (2001–2005). Member of the jury of the III All-Ukrainian Symposium of Monumental Ceramics "Poetry of Pottery on the Squares and Parks of Ukraine" (1999) and the II All-Ukrainian Pottery Festival (2001). Member of the supervisory board of the National Museum of Ukrainian Pottery in Opishnia (from 2001), co-chairman of the National Expert Ceramics Council of the annual National Contests of Publications on Ceramics, Pottery, Ceramics in Ukraine "KeHoKe" (from 2007). Member of the International Association of Art Critics (2005).

== Biography ==
Orest Holubets was born on 25 October 1954 in Lviv in the family of professor, academician of the National Academy of Sciences of Ukraine, Honored Science and Technology Figure of Ukraine of Ukraine Mykhailo Holubets.

During 1971-1976 he studied at the Lviv State Institute of Applied and Decorative Arts at the Department of Art Ceramics (his teachers were well-known masters and scientists Karlo Zvirynskyi, Mykhailo Lozynskyi, Nelli Fedchun, Zenovii Flinta.

For ten years, he worked as a researcher at the Lviv branch of the Rylsky Institute of Art Studies, Folklore and Ethnology. In 1979–1982, he participated in ceramics symposiums in Dzintaru (Jūrmala, Latvia).

In 1987 and 1989, Orest Mykhailovych was an intern at the Ukrainian Free University in Munich, Germany, during the summer semester.

In 1990–1993, he served as Secretary of the Academic Council and was promoted to associate professor. In 1996–2001, Orest Mykhailovych headed the Center for International Relations and Marketing (as a deputy rector), in 2000–2001 he headed the Department of Art Ceramics, and in 2001–2007 he held the position of Vice-Rector for Research. Currently, Orest Holubets is a professor at the Department of Ceramics at the Lviv National Academy of Arts.

In 2004, he was awarded the academic title of professor. In the same year, 2004, the Polish Ministry of Education nostrificated his doctorate in art history to the level of a doctor of habilitation in humanities.

Orest Holubets is the organizer and co-organizer of numerous international art events, including:

- "Sources of Freedom: Berlin - Wrocław - Lviv". Exhibition of contemporary art dedicated to the 46th Eucharistic Congress (Poland, Wrocław, 1997);
- "Art and its changes after the fall of totalitarianism in Central and Eastern Europe". International scientific conference (Poland, Łódź, 1997);
- "Silver Square", international biennial of painting of the Carpathian Euroregion (Poland, 1998, 2000, 2003, 2006, 2009);
- "Art at the Turn of the Millennium", international cultural and artistic event (Lviv, 1998);
- "Crossing Point", an international cultural and artistic project with the participation of graduates of art academies in Lviv, Lodz, and Stuttgart (Łódź, Stuttgart, Lviv, 2000–2001);
- "ArcheNytkaNovo". International Symposium (Lviv, 2006);
- Festival of Art Photography: Ukraine-Poland-Lithuania (Lviv, 2007);
- "Windows are the Eyes of the House". International Biennial of Photography (Lviv, 2007);
- "Veselka", an art project (Lviv, 2006–2007).

== Prizes and awards ==
- 1997 – Zenovii Flinta Prize.
- 2001 – Certificate of Honor from the Ministry of Education and Science of Ukraine.

== Scientific works ==
Orest Mykhailovych is the author of more than 350 publications in Ukrainian and foreign periodicals, albums, collections and catalogs (Bulgaria, Lithuania, Germany, Poland, Japan).

=== Selected publications ===
Monographs, albums

- Lvivska keramika (1991)
- Mizh svobodoiu i totalitaryzmom: Mystetske seredovyshche Lvova druhoi polovyny XX stolittia (2001)
- Vasyl Bodnarchuk. Pidsumovuiuchy proidene (2008)
- Mystetstvo XX stolittia — ukrainskyi shliakh (2012)
- Suchasne maliarstvo Lvova (2014)
- Suchasna skulptura Lvova (2015)
- Labirynty tvorchosti (2024)

Compiler and author of introductory articles for catalogs and booklets

- Oshurkevych Halyna: Keramika (1984);
- Ivan Frank: Vystavka keramiky (1988);
- Mykhailo Kordiiaka: Keramika / Kataloh, Yaroshevych Uliana: Keramika (1989);
- Sheremeta Yaroslav: Keramika, zhyvopys, hrafika (1990);
- Vasyl Hudak: Keramika. Zhyvopys. Hrafika / Kataloh vystavky, Frank Ivan: Sim kompozytsii (1992);
- Khoda Ihor: Keramika (1995);
- Lvivska akademiia mystetstv: Keramika (1996);
- Ivan Frank: Keramika. Hrafika / Kataloh (1997);
- Vasyl Bodnarchuk: Keramika / Kataloh (1998);
- Taras Levkiv: Keramika, Hrafika. Intarsiia / Kataloh (2000);
- Keramika Vasylia Bodnarchuka / Kataloh (2003);
- Taras Levkiv: Keramika, hrafika, intarsiia (2007).

== Bibliography ==
- Голубець Орест Михайлович // Кераміка України / М. А. Серб (голова); Л. П. Мисан, О. В. Гавриленко, В. А. Онищенко, С. М. Андрусів, І. В. Пошивайло, С. І. Проскура, Т. О. Пріхна, О. М. Голубець (редакційна колегія). — Київ : ТОВ «Видавничий центр "Логос Україна"», 2009. — С. 36. — ISBN 978-966-1581-04-2.
- М. Є. Станкевич. Голубець Орест Михайлович // Енциклопедія сучасної України / ред. кол.: І. М. Дзюба [та ін.] ; НАН України, НТШ. — К. : Інститут енциклопедичних досліджень НАН України, 2006. — Т. 6 : Го — Гю. — 712 с. — ISBN 966-02-3966-1.
