= Lviv Experimental Ceramic and Sculptural Factory =

Ukrainian company (1947–2005)

The Lviv Experimental Ceramic and Sculptural Factory, which operated from 1947 to 2005, was founded by the Lviv organization of the Union of Artists of Ukraine.

The factory had two main workshops: ceramics and blown glass, the latter opening in 1962. The chief artist of the enterprise was F. Cherniak.

In 1949, the factory began producing ceramic items, mostly souvenirs. In the late 1950s, the production of stoneware products was introduced. The assortment significantly expanded to include decorative thematic plates, utilitarian and decorative tableware (such as butter dishes, salt shakers, mugs, flasks, decanters, beverage pitchers, coffee sets, tankards, and other traditional vessels), as well as table vases, planters, cachepots, and candlesticks. Among the factory's products were household and decorative plates, animalistic figurines, goblets, cups, vases for flowers and fruits, candlesticks, and ashtrays. Barrels, decanters, flasks, and vessels shaped like animals—bears, rams, roosters, birds, and fish—were also produced. All these items were adorned with appliqués, colorful ornaments, picturesque paintings, and intricate "Venetian thread" openwork.

The factory's products are presented at regional and international exhibitions. The main products of the enterprise were artistic ceramic and glass items, including coffee and tea sets, vases, as well as sculptures made of metal, stone, and plaster.

== Bibliography ==
- Голубець О. Львівська кераміка / Орест Голубець. — Київ : Наукова думка, 1991. — 120 с. — 4000 прим. — ISBN 5-12-001783-1.
- Лащук Ю. П. Кераміка // Нариси з історії українського декоративно-прикладного мистецтва / ред. кол. П. М. Жолтовський, Ю. П. Лащук, О. О. Чарновський; Міністерство вищої та середньої спеціальної освіти УРСР, Львівський державний інститут прикладного та декоративного мистецтва. — Видавництво Львівського університету, 1969. — С. 123—130.
- Львівська експериментальна кераміко-скульптурна фабрика = Lviv experimental ceramico-sculptural factory. — Київ : Реклама, 1980. — 119 с.
- "ЛКСФ: історія заснування та мистецька освіта". lksf.online. Archived from the original on 2022-09-30.
- Романа Мотиль Львівська експериментальна кераміко-скульптурна фабрика як чинник творчого розвитку львівської школи кераміки у другій половині XX ст. // Народознавчі зошити. — № 1 (157). — 2021. — С. 119—130.
- Щербак В. А. Сучасна українська майоліка / Ю. Я. Турченко (відповідальний редактор). — Київ : Наукова думка, 1974. — 190 с. — ISBN 5-12-001783-1.
