= Roman Selskyi =

Ukrainian impressionist painter (1903–1990)

- Роман Юліанович Сельський
- Born: 21 May 1903; Sokal, Austria-Hungary (now Ukraine)
- Died: 3 February 1990 (aged 86); Lviv
- Education: Krakow Academy of Fine Arts
- Occupation: Impressionist painter

Roman Selskyi (Ukrainian: Роман Юліанович Сельський; 21 May 1903 – 3 February 1990) was a Ukrainian impressionist painter. He was a member of the Union of Artists of Ukraine (1939).

== Biography ==
Selskyi was born on 21 May 1903 in Sokal.

In 1922 he graduated from the Lviv Art and Industrial School and also studied privately with Oleksa Novakivskyi. In 1918–1920 he attended the private Free Academy, where he tried his hand at painting. In 1927, he graduated from the Krakow Academy of Fine Arts. Then he improved his skills in Paris and Vienna.

From 1929 he worked as an artist in Lviv. He taught from 1934 to 1939 at the Lviv State Institute of Plastic Arts; from 1939 to 1941 at the Lviv State Institute of Applied and Decorative Arts; and from 1944 to 1947 at the Ivan Trush Lviv State School of Applied Arts. In 1947, he began working as the head of the department, and then as an associate professor at the Lviv State Institute of Applied and Decorative Arts.

He died on 3 January 1990 in Lviv.

== Creativity ==
Most of Selskyi's paintings are devoted to landscape. Among his students are Danylo Dovboshynskyi, Volodymyr Patyk, Ivan Skobalo, Mykola Andrushchenko, Mykola Krystopchuk, Yevhen Lysyk, Liubomyr Medvid,Ivan Marchuk and others.

The works are kept in Lviv, Kyiv, and Warsaw museums. His first personal exhibition was held in 1967. He was the head of the "Artes" association of artists, as well as a member of the Association of Independent Ukrainian Artists, and a participant in its exhibitions.

Main paintings: "Port" (1931), "Yakhtklub v Maiori" (1949), "Kvity" (1959), "Karpatskyi peizazh" (1960), "Siti" (1966), "Hariache lito" (1971), "Hutsulshchy- na" (1972), "Morskyi prychal" (1973), "U Maniavskomu zapovidnyku" (1980), "Svirzh" (1981), "Na Chornohori" (1982), "Kvity v Karpatakh" (1984) and others.

== Awards ==
From 1989 he was awarded the title of People's Painter of the Ukrainian SSR.

== Bibliography ==
- L. Voloshyn (2024). "Сельський Роман". Мистецька школа Олекси Новаківського 1923-1935. Життя у перспективі часу (in Ukrainian). Lviv–Drohobych: Kolo. p. 207—211, 421—422. ISBN 978-617-642-676-9.
