= Borys Voznytsky Lviv National Art Gallery =

Coordinates: 49°50′13.26″N 24°1′31.11″E

- Львівська Національна Галерея Мистецтв імені Бориса Возницького
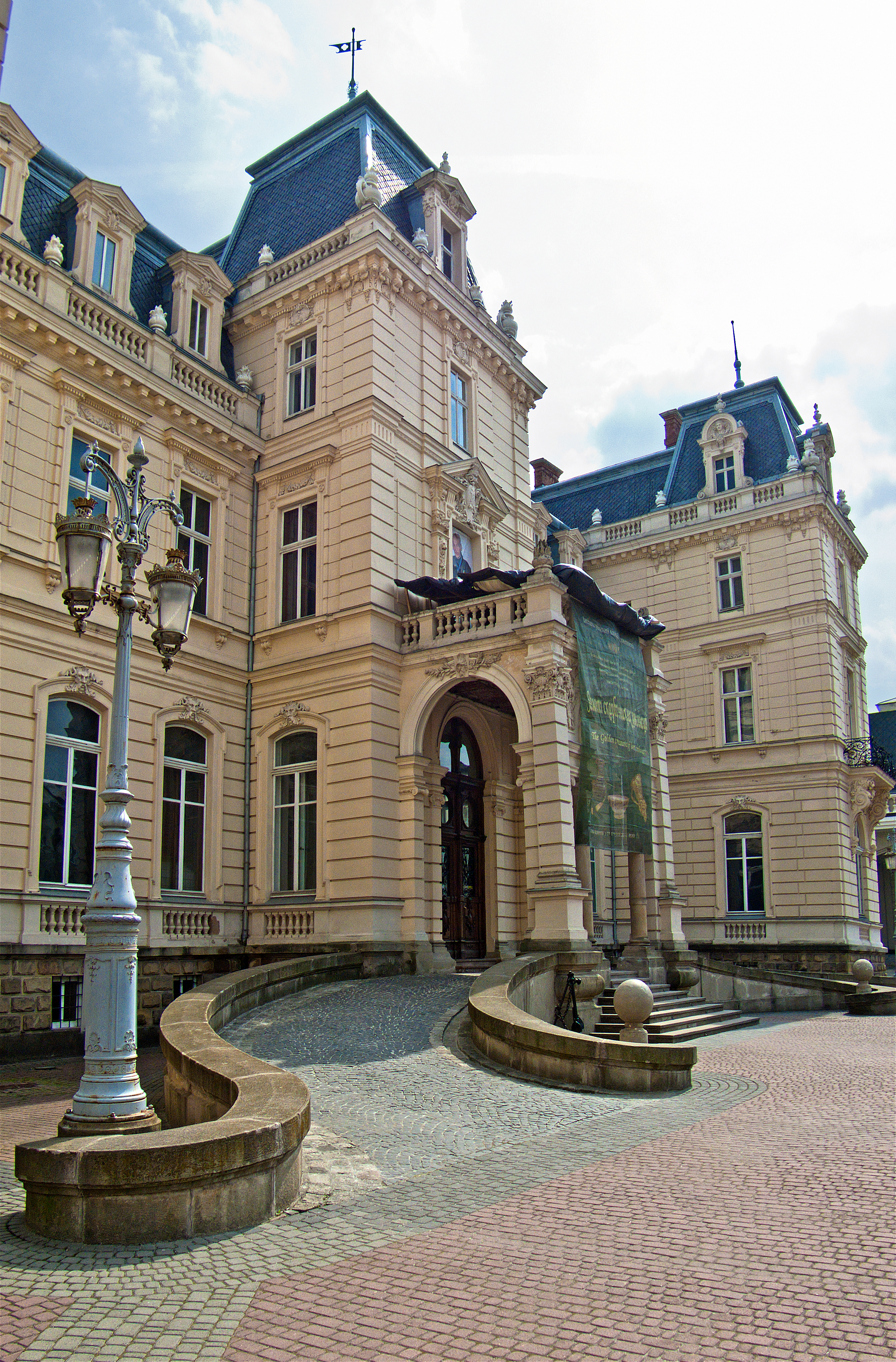
- Potocki Palace.
- Former name: Lwowska Galeria Sztuki
- Established: 1897
- Location: 3 Stefanyka street Lviv, Ukraine
- Type: Art museum
- Accreditation: 1907
- Collections: Western European Art, Soviet Art, Ukrainian Art
- Collection size: 62,000
- Director: Taras Voznyak
- Website: lvivgallery.org.ua

The Borys Voznytsky Lviv National Art Gallery (Ukrainian: Львівська Національна галерея мистецтв імені Бориса Возницького) is the largest art museum in Ukraine, with over 62,000 artworks in its collection, including works of Ukrainian, Polish, Italian, French, German, Dutch and Flemish, Spanish, Austrian and other European artists. The artwork is currently divided into three major collections, housed in the historic Łoziński and Potocki Palaces, while the Gallery additionally has the charge of fifteen small museums and historical buildings in or close to Lviv.

The decision to found a municipal gallery of art was made in 1897, with the Lviv Art Gallery first formally opened in 1907. The museum experienced grave difficulties during the early Soviet era and World War II, as the Soviets regarded the existence of anything like a nationally-oriented museum collection with antipathy and distrust. In a notorious episode, the museum's wartime director, Ivan Ivanets, was kidnapped by SMERSH and executed in Russian territory in 1946.

During the 1960s and 1990s, under the directorship of revered art historian Borys Voznytsky, the Lviv Art Gallery became a significant museum center with multiple branches. In recognition of the size and quality of its collection, it received its status as the National Art Gallery of Ukraine in October, 2009 and on April 12, 2013, the Lviv National Gallery of Arts became the Boris Vosznytsky Lviv National Gallery of Arts, in honor of Vosznytsky's more than 40 years service, through the period Soviet rule and into that of independent Ukraine,

== The Collection ==
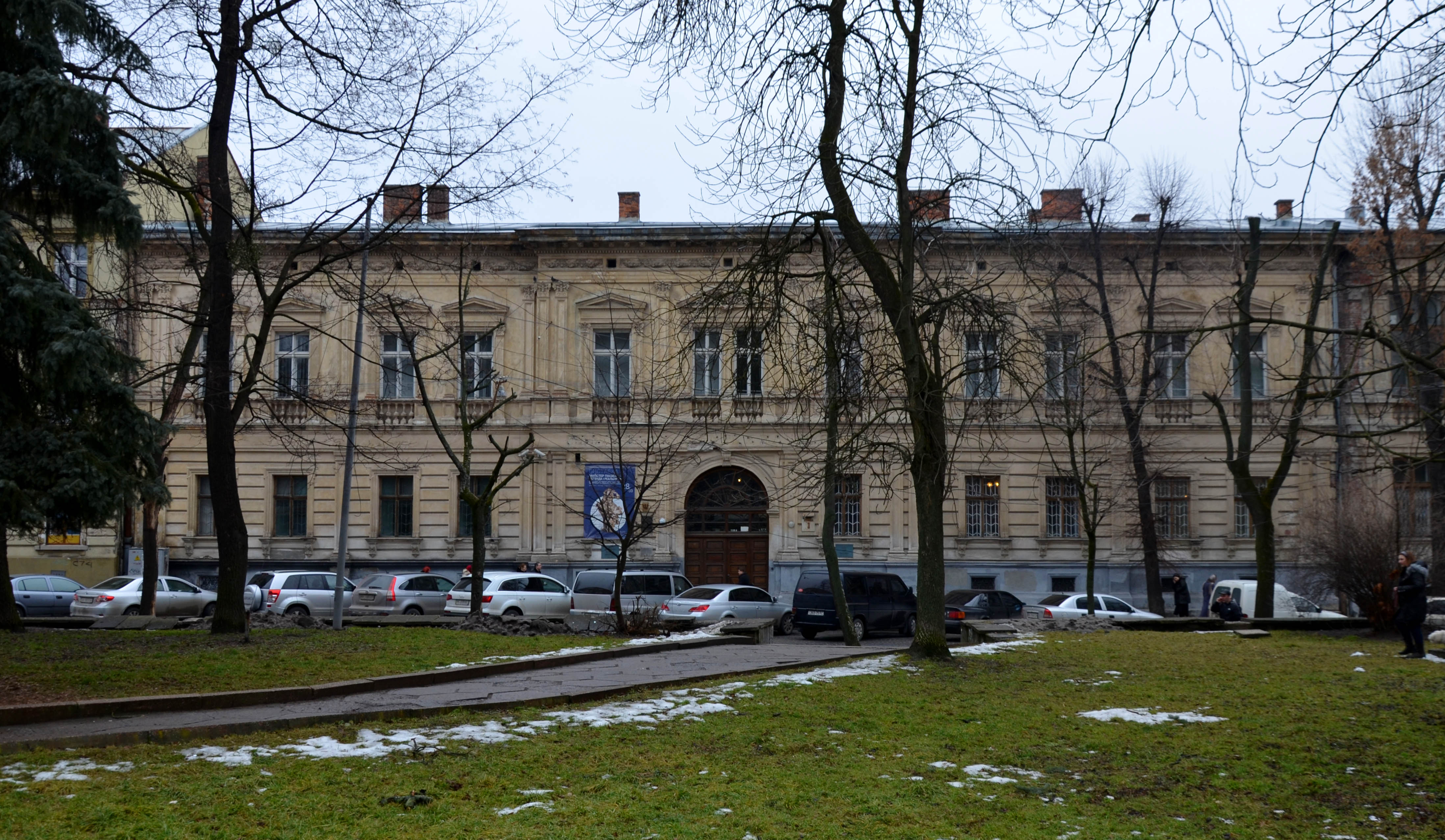
Łoziński Palace, Lviv. From 1914, home of the Lviv Art Gallery's collection, current home of the Lviv National Art Gallery's collection of 19th—21st century European Art

The Gallery's collections are spread (in some cases for logistical purposes) across numerous sites in and around Lviv, with the bulk of the collections held in two 19th-century palaces near the city center. Władysław Łoziński's Palace (built in 1872-1874, architect F. Pokutynsky) was the site of the original 1907 institution. Today Łoziński Palace houses some of the newest art, while the recently renovated Potocki Palace (completed 1890, designed by French architect Louis Dovern) houses the older work.

=== Łoziński Palace: 19th & 20th century European Art ===
==== Eastern European Art, 19th — early 20th century ====
The chronological and stylistic principle of the art on display in the first exhibition galleries is intended to highlight the complexity and diversity of the artistic and intellectual life, in particular in Lviv, starting from the early 19th century. This was a time of intense political chaos in Eastern Europe, as colonizing empires competed for political control. Amidst this chaos, the depiction of historical landmarks, historical monuments, castles, or even of applied arts or individuals, assumed a highly political flavor.

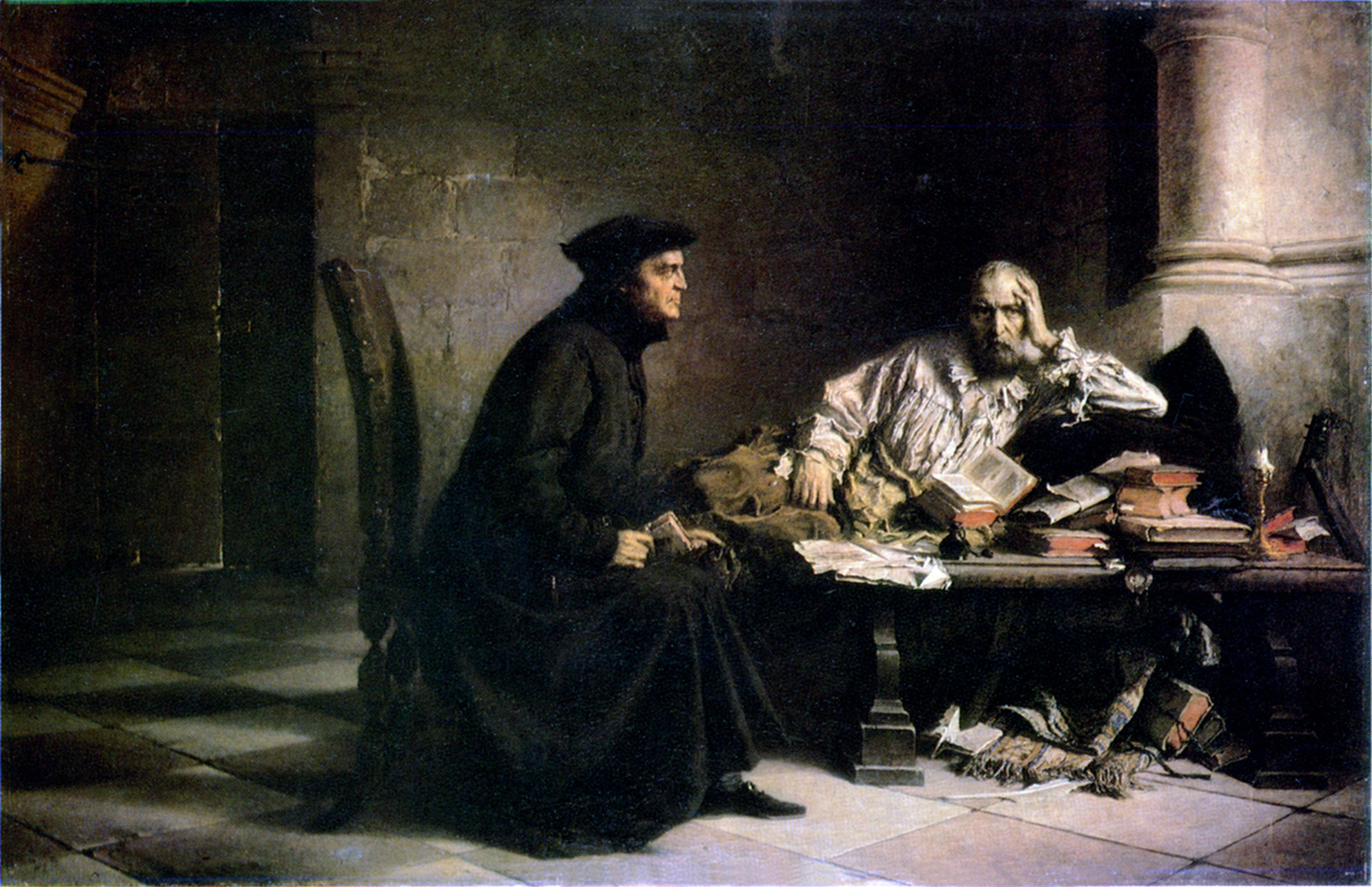
Wilhelm Leopolski, Death of Acerna (1865-7) Lviv National Art Gallery

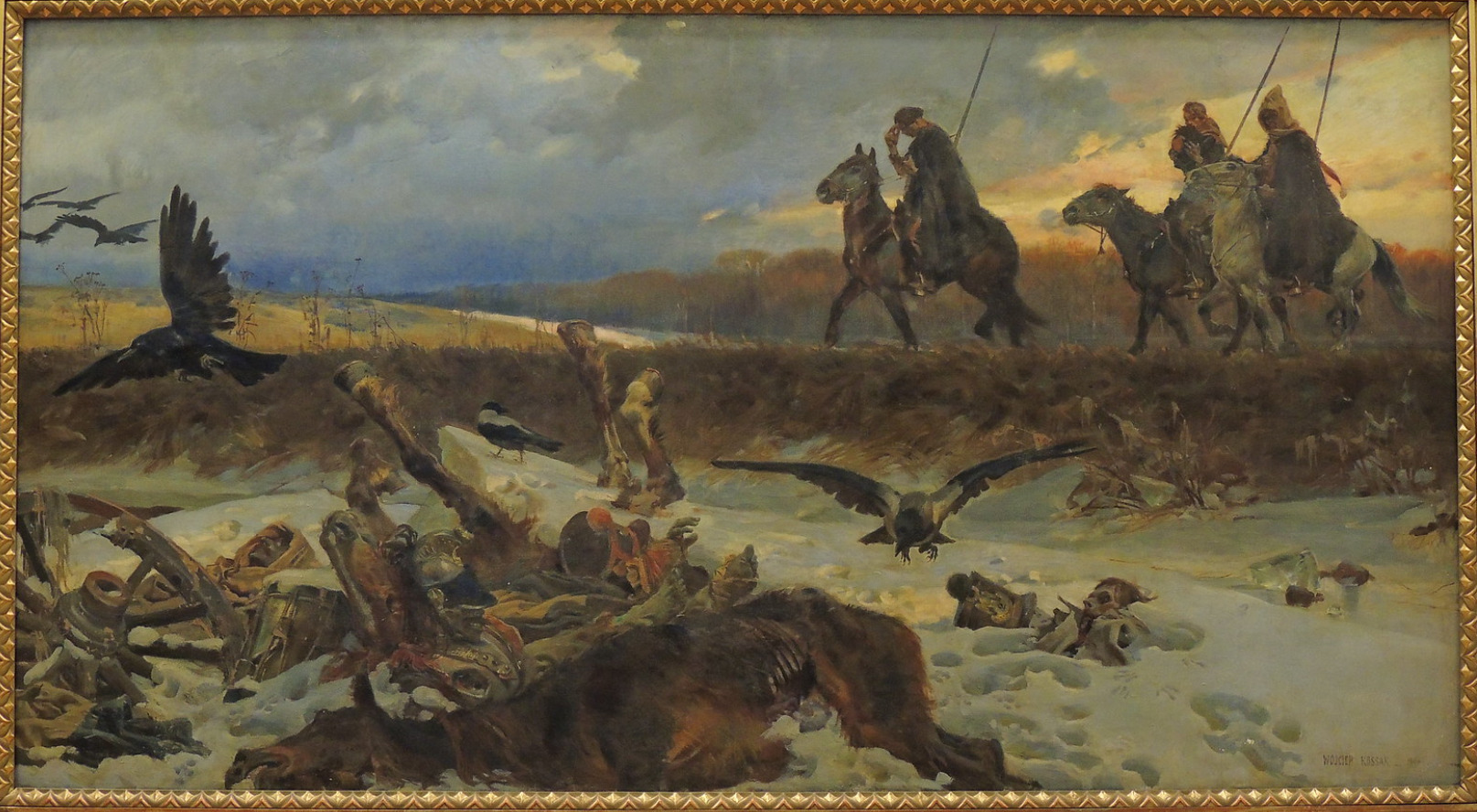
Wojciech Kossak, Spring of 1813 (1904), Lviv National Art Gallery

In this context, Wilhelm Leopolski's historical painting The Death of Acerna (1865-7) is presented as it was intended: a celebration of specifically Polish heroism, seen through the lens of a Polish poet, in a scene taken from the poem of the same name by Władysław Syrokomla (1823—1862). Acerna, the 16th century Polish patriot poet, is shown on his deathbed in the mode of a stoic.

The folly of war and the death of Napoleon's troops in the war of 1812 are reflected in Wojciech Kossak's historical painting Spring, 1813 (1904). The carnage the image depicts, superficially a representation of the expulsion of an invading force, more deeply reflects the local tragedy that the Poles took part in the war on the side of Napoleon, mistakenly believing that he would become the liberator of Poland and the country would restore its statehood.

Ottyniowice-born Artur Grottger, by contrast, is represented by his paintings of Ukrainian types, Ukrainka, and Sketch of a Peasant Woman Wearing a Headscarf (1831), with his paintings Nocturne (1864), and United by Death imbued less with heroic ideals than with longing for the dead.

Also in these galleries are the works of François Gérard, Jacek Malczewski, Mykhailo Boichuk, Peter Kholodny, Yaroslava Muzyka and others.

==== Matejko Collection ====
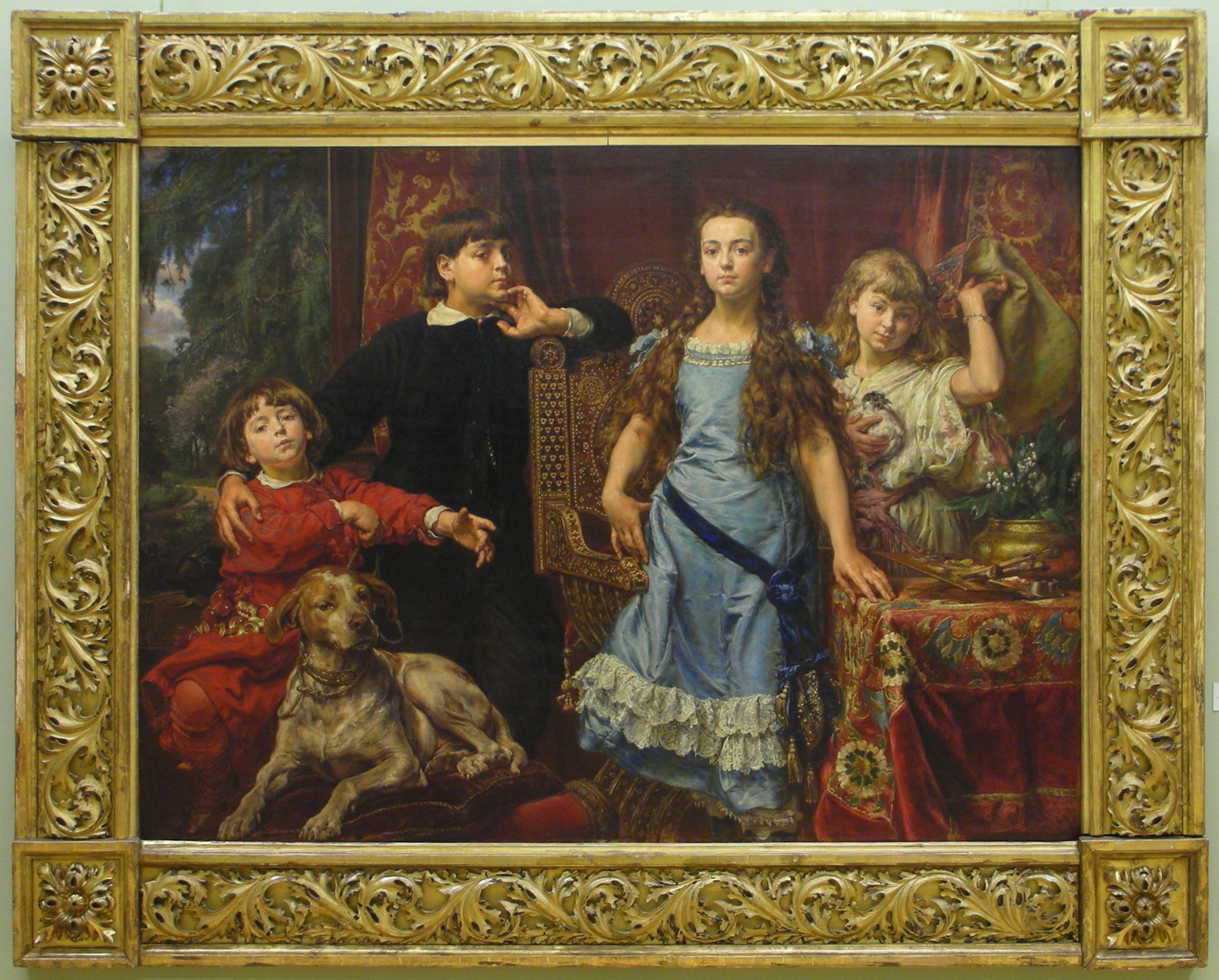
Jan Matejko, Portrait of the Artist's Children (1879), Lviv National Art Gallery

Jan Matejko (1838-1893) was one of the foundational artists of the Lviv Gallery collection. His work was included at the Gallery's inaugural 1902 exhibition, and exemplifies the foundational principals of the gallery. The Lviv Gallery holds the largest collection of Matejko's work, outside of Poland. The work demonstrates the wide range of Matejko's artistic expression, including both major treatments of historical themes (Carl Gustav and Szymon Starowolski at the Locket Tomb) and important intimate family paintings (Portrait of the Artist's Children, 1879). Matejko's intense interest in the historical record of his nation and his desire to promote Polish patriotism push his work beyond illustration of history to commentary upon its moral content.

==== Other Significant Works ====
Paul Merwart turned away from social issues to the Bible. His work Flood has a taste of academicism and salon art of the second half of the 19th century, with its polished figures and Alma-Tadema-esque composition. Among the highlights of Polish painting in Lviv is Rome Street at Night by Aleksander Gierymski.

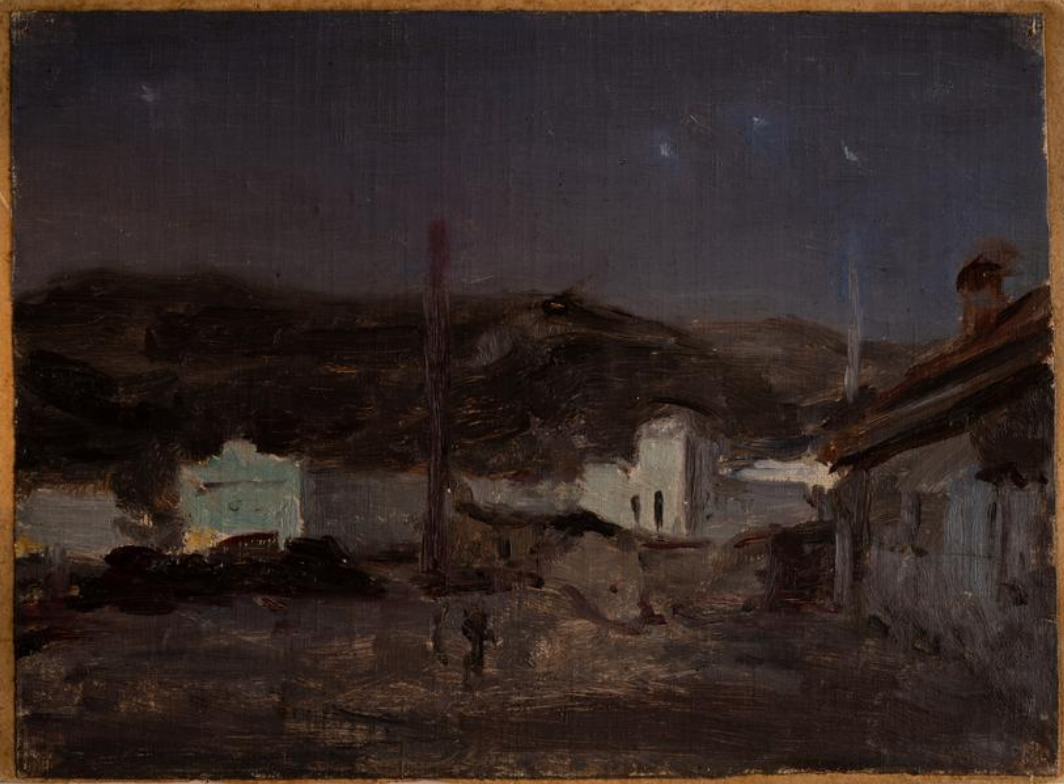
Jan Ciągliński, Yalta (1900), Lviv National Art Gallery

Symbolism in Polish art is represented by the works of Jacek Malczewski: Self-Portrait with a Muse (1904), Pythia (1917), Christ before Pilate (1910) and Edward Okuń's Philistines. Impressionist art is influenced by the works of the portraitist Olga Boznańska: Portrait of S. Hirschenberg, Female Portrait, Children, and the work of Ferdynand Ruszyc Let's go into the world, a Polish student of Arkhip Kuindzhi .

The works of Władysław Jarocki, Kazimierz Sichulski, and Włodzimierz Tetmajer represent the work of the Society of Polish Artists "Sztuka". A friend and follower of Paul Gauguin - Władysław Ślewiński is also presented in the gallery (Sea, Still Life, Brittany. Fisherman).

The search for the new continues in the Polish expressionism of Zygmunt Waliszewski (Still Life with Pears), Stanisław Osostowicz (Street-Chestnuts) and Zygmunt Radnicki (Fruits). The collection of works of the 20th century (S. Umbrella's "Uprising"; Feliks Michał Wygrzywalski Labor) is temporarily completed.

A separate part of the exposition show the formation of the Lviv portrait. They are presented by works of artists from the Reykhanov, Mashkovsky and Martin Jablonski families. Here are some portraits of Artur Grottger (Portrait of a Daughter, 1881) by Henryk Rodakowski, Kasper Żelechowski, Aleksander Kotsis, and Józef Brandt. The art halls of Lviv of 1900-1930 acquaint with the works of artists who were members of the associations ANUM, ARTES, "New Generation".

==== Works not on Permanent Display ====
The works on display in Łoziński Palace's exhibition halls represent only a fraction of the Gallery's collection. Lviv holds the most significant deposits of works by several Polish painters outside of the Kraków and Warsaw museums, including over 137 works by Jan Ciągliński, whose works are considered some of the first in the Impressionist genre in Russia, and whose loose, supple brushwork is reminiscent of John Singer Sargent, with whom he shared a taste for exotic locals and landscapes.

Lviv National Art Museum: 19th Century Paintings

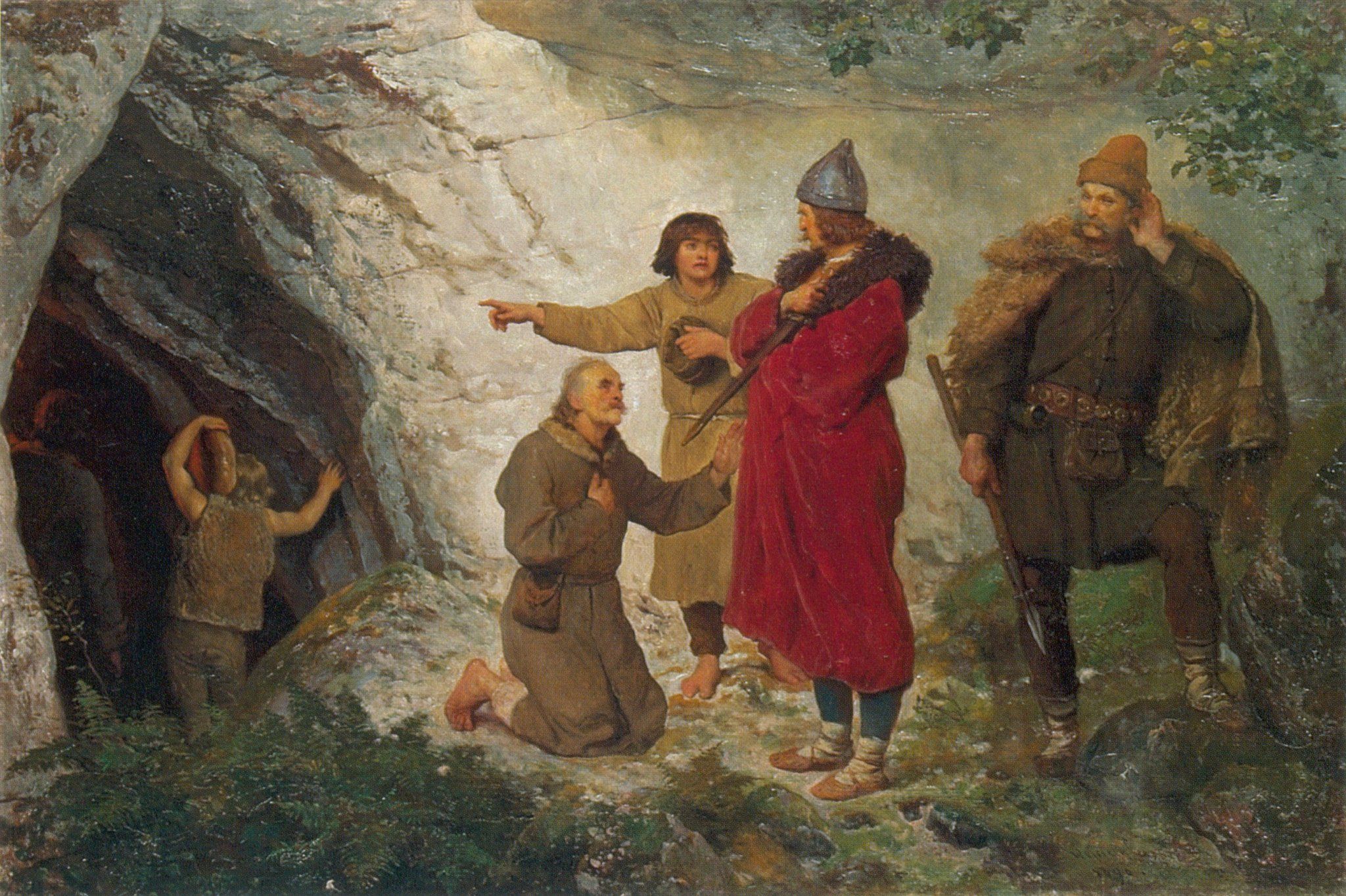
Wojciech Gerson, Władysław the Elbow-high near Ojców (1890)

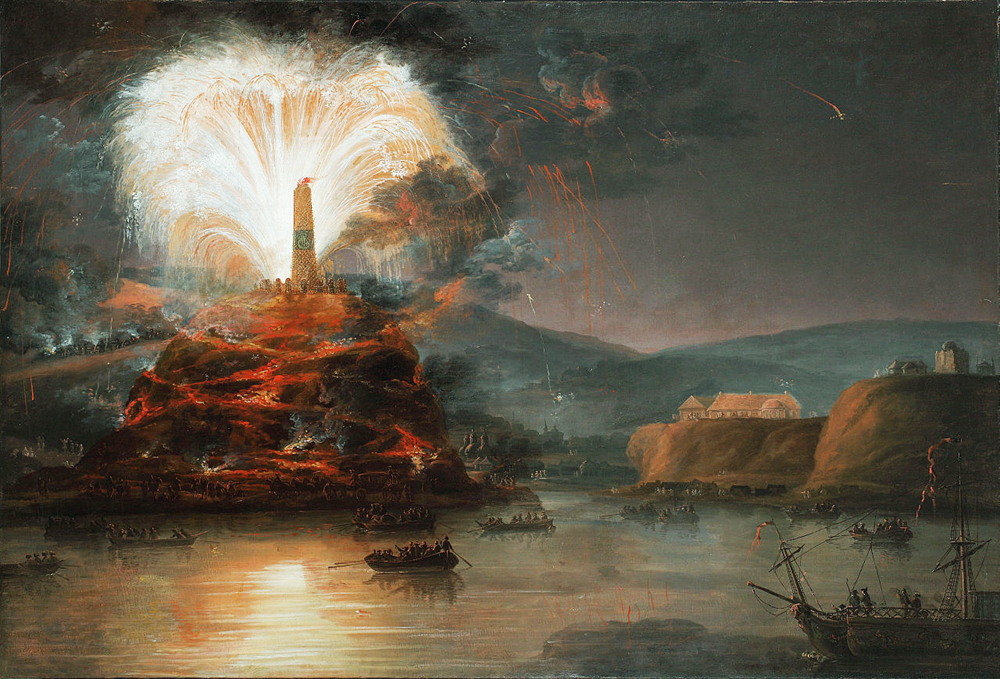
Jan Bogumił Plersch, Fireworks in honor of Catherine II, (~1787)

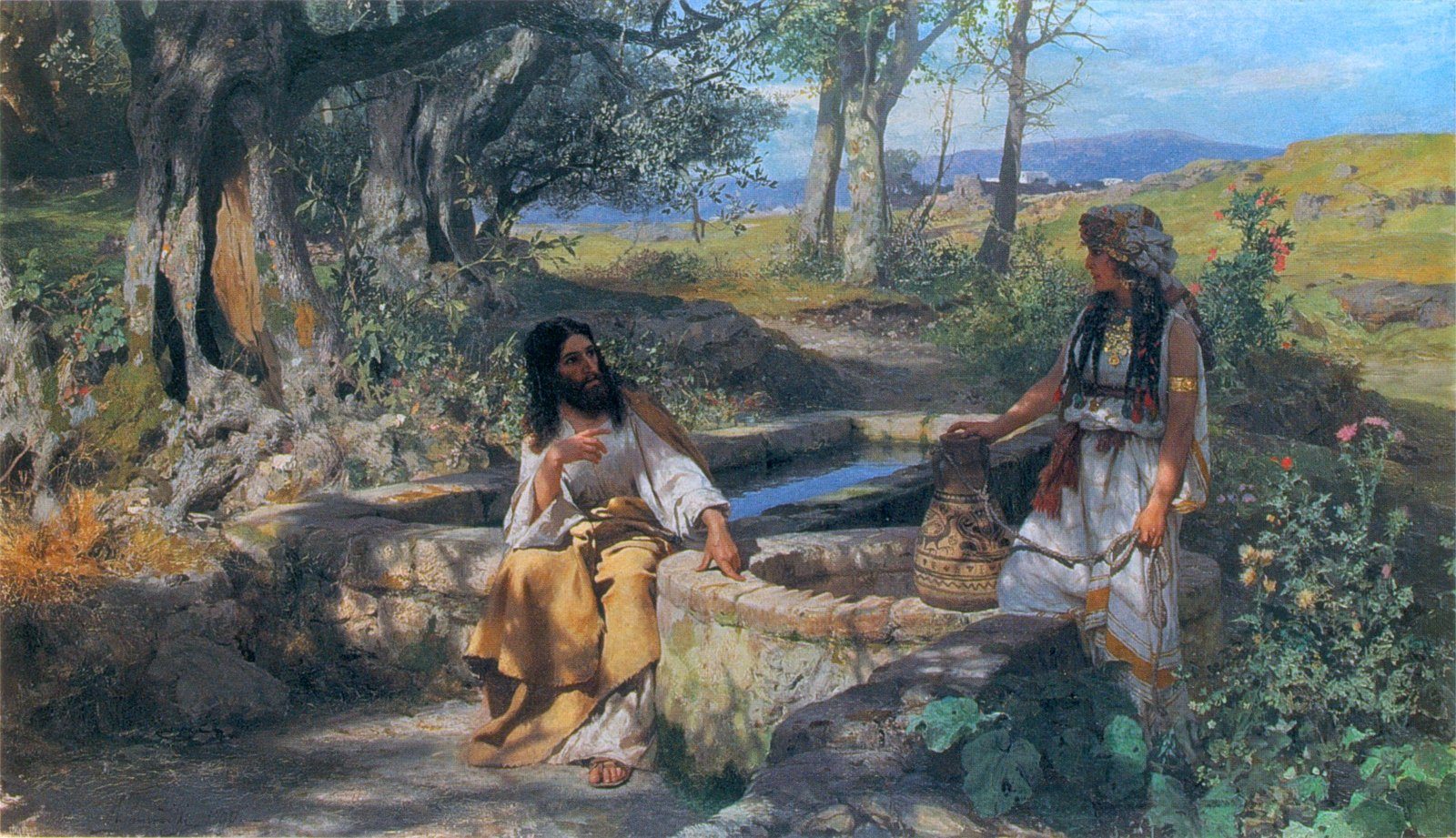
Henryk Siemiradzki, Christ and the Samaritan woman (1890)

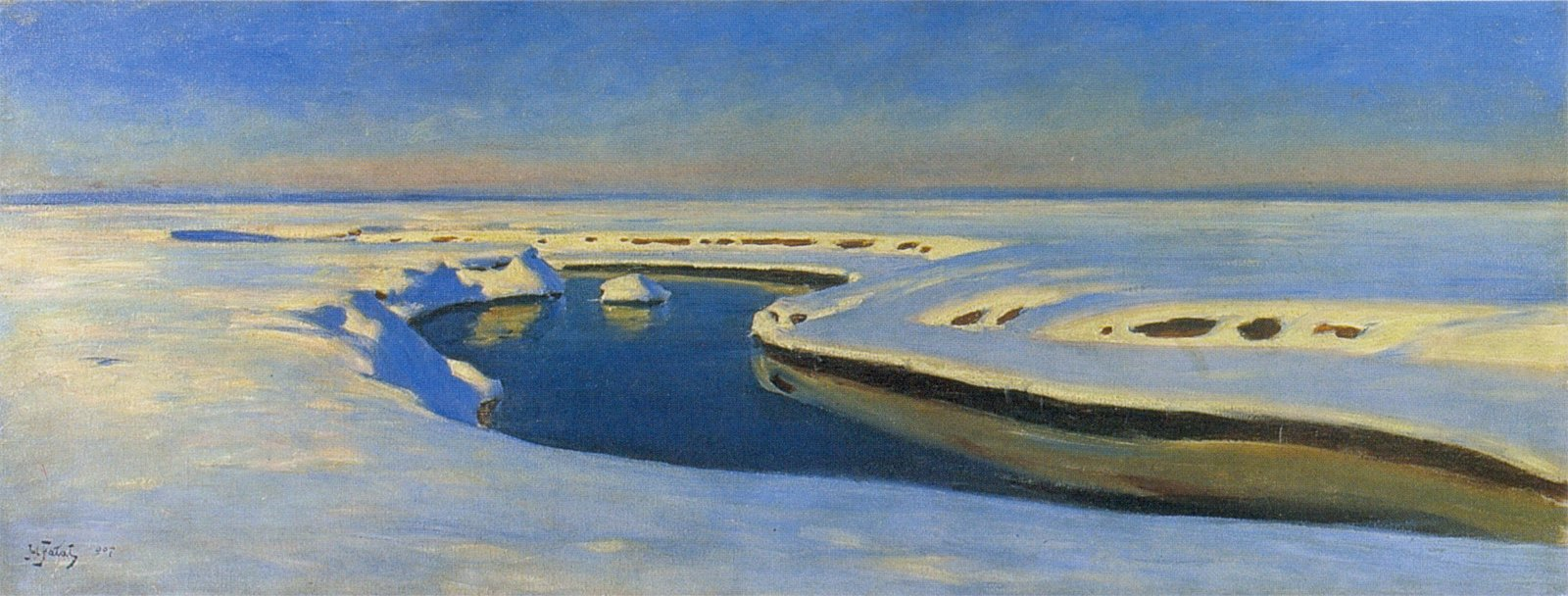
Julian Fałat, Snow (1907)

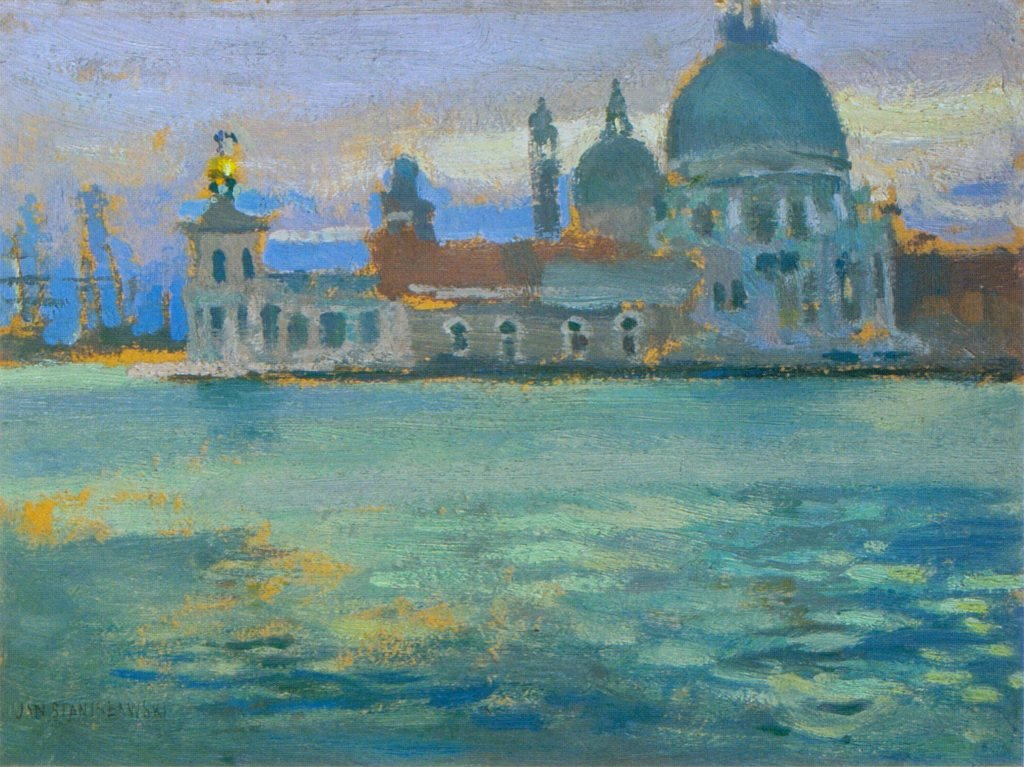
Jan Stanisławski, Santa Maria della Salute (1904)

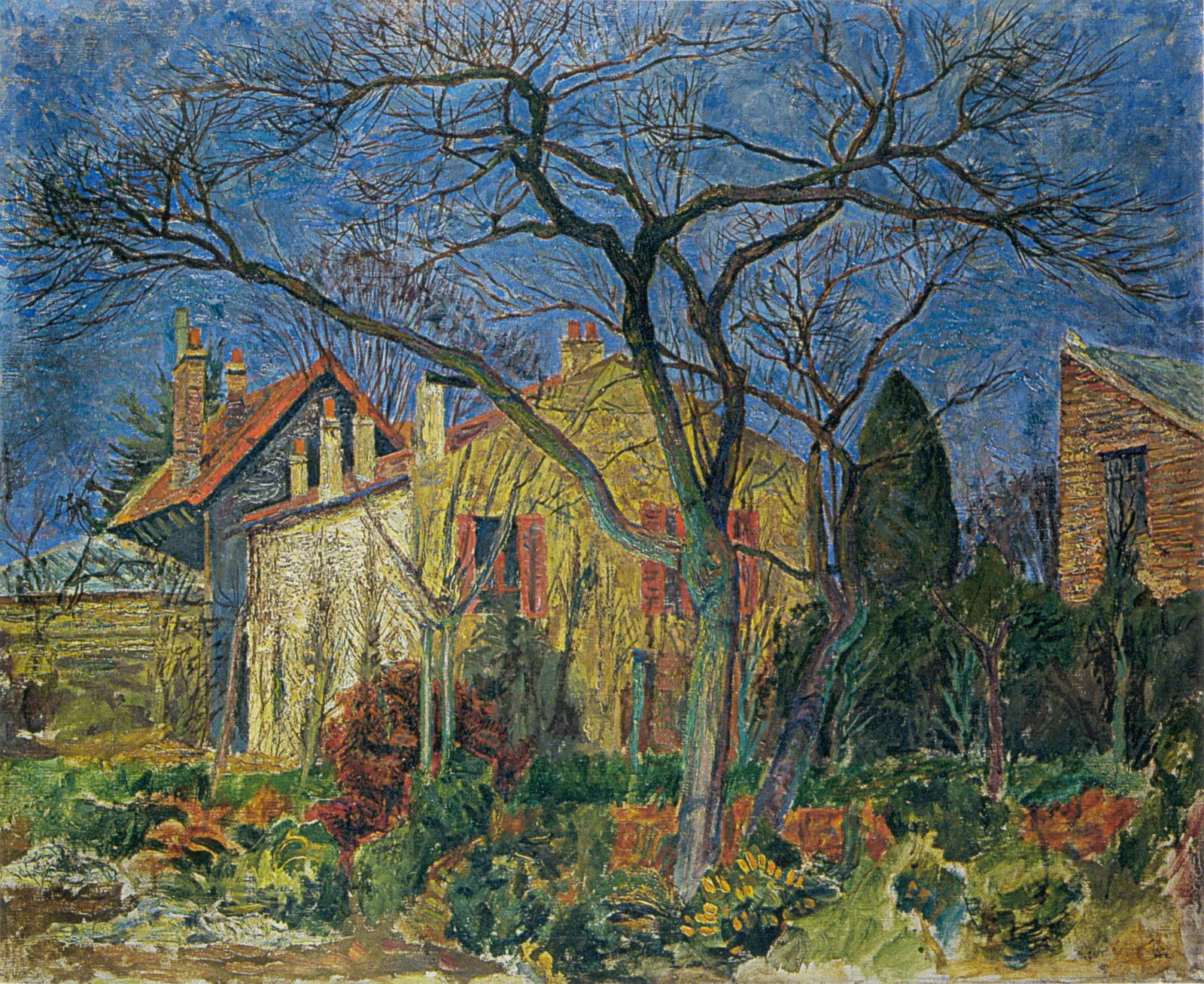
Zygmunt Waliszewski, Landscape from Meaux (1929)

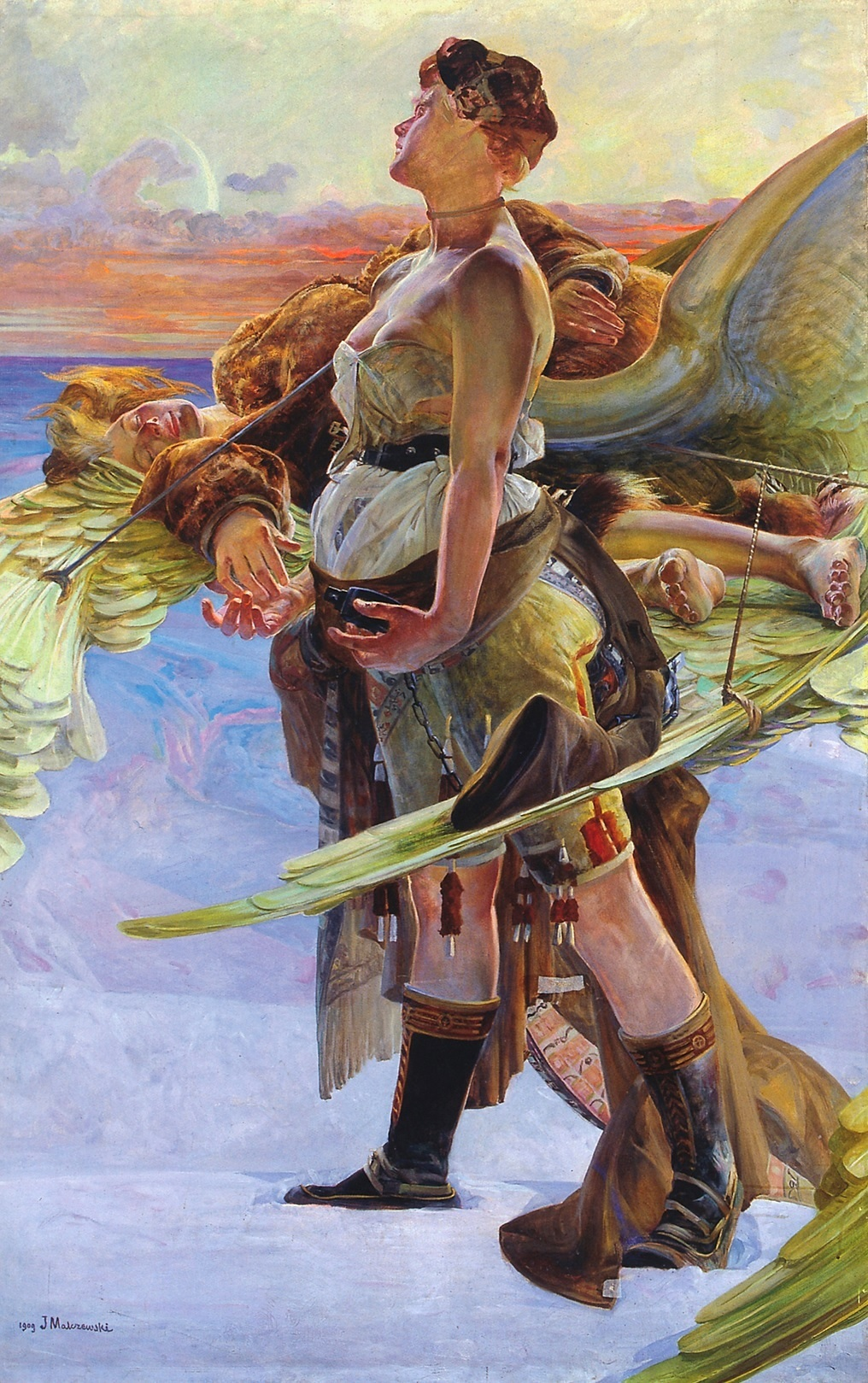
Jacek Malczewski, Eloe (1909)

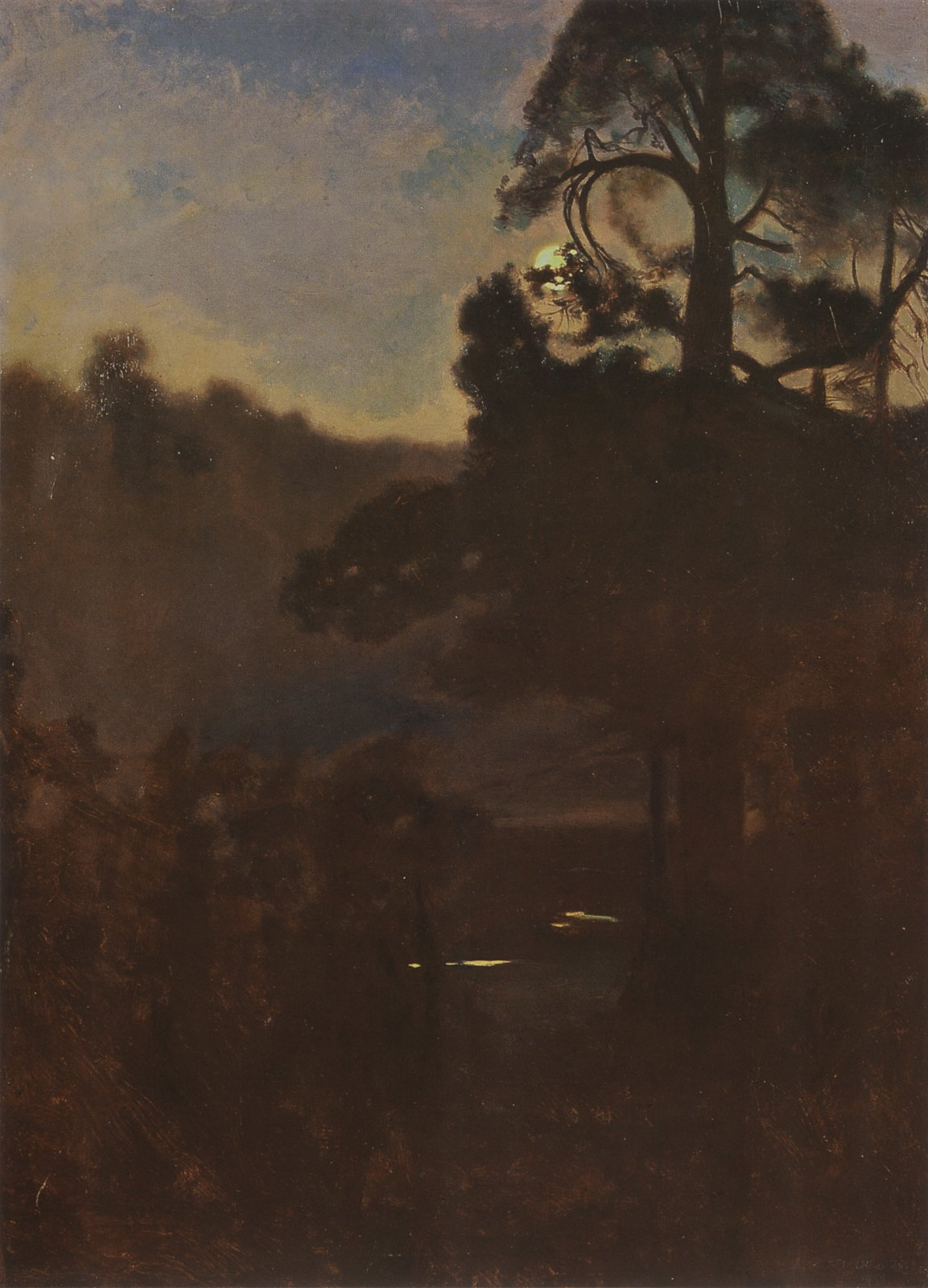
Józef Chełmoński, Moonlight night (1906)

=== Łoziński Palace: Museum of Modernism ===
Contemporary art and exhibitions space.

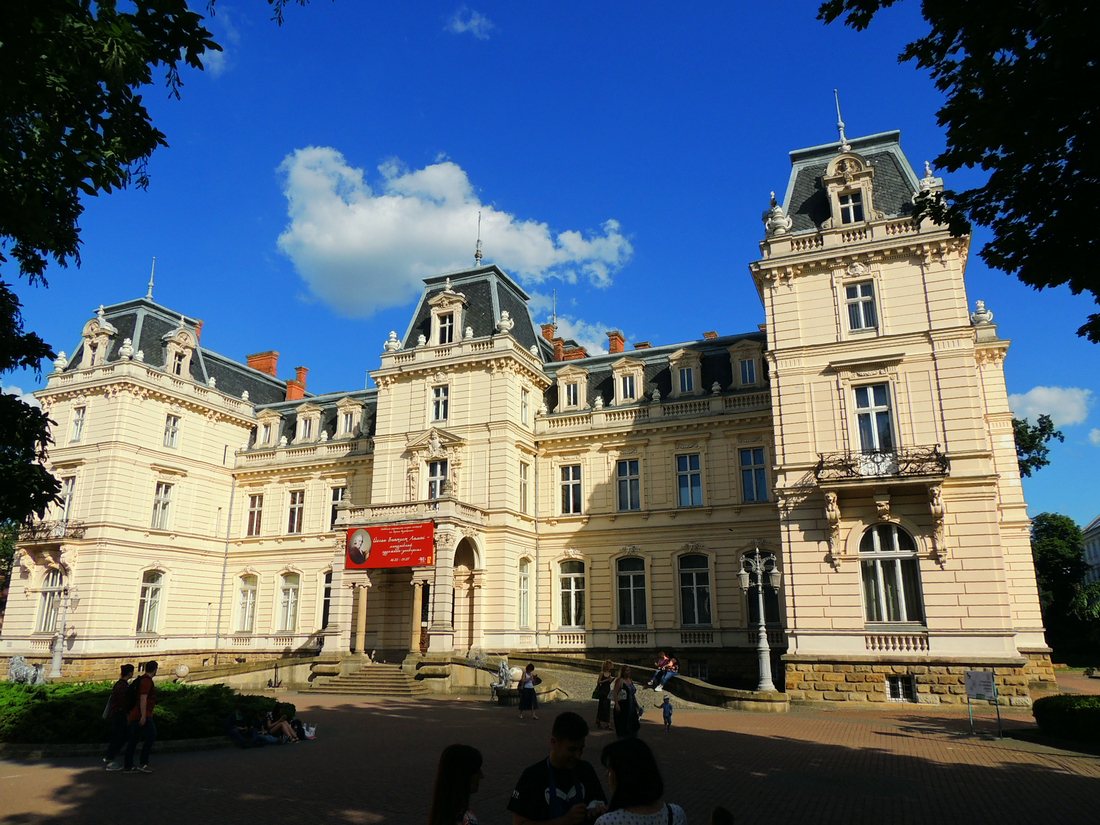
Potocki Palace, Lviv. From 2007, home of the Lviv National Art Gallery's collection of early European Art

=== Potocki Palace: European Art of the 14th - 18th centuries ===
The palace was designed by Parisian architect Louis Dauvergne and Juliusz Cybulski and completed in 1890. In 2002, the city transferred Potocki Palace to the Lviv National Art Gallery for restoration and future use. On February 14, 2007, the Gallery's 100 year anniversary, the palace was opened as the new home of the department of European Art of the 14th - 18th centuries. The halls on the first floor are dedicated to a historical recreation of the palace's original interiors, while the second floor holds one of the richest collections of European art in Ukraine.

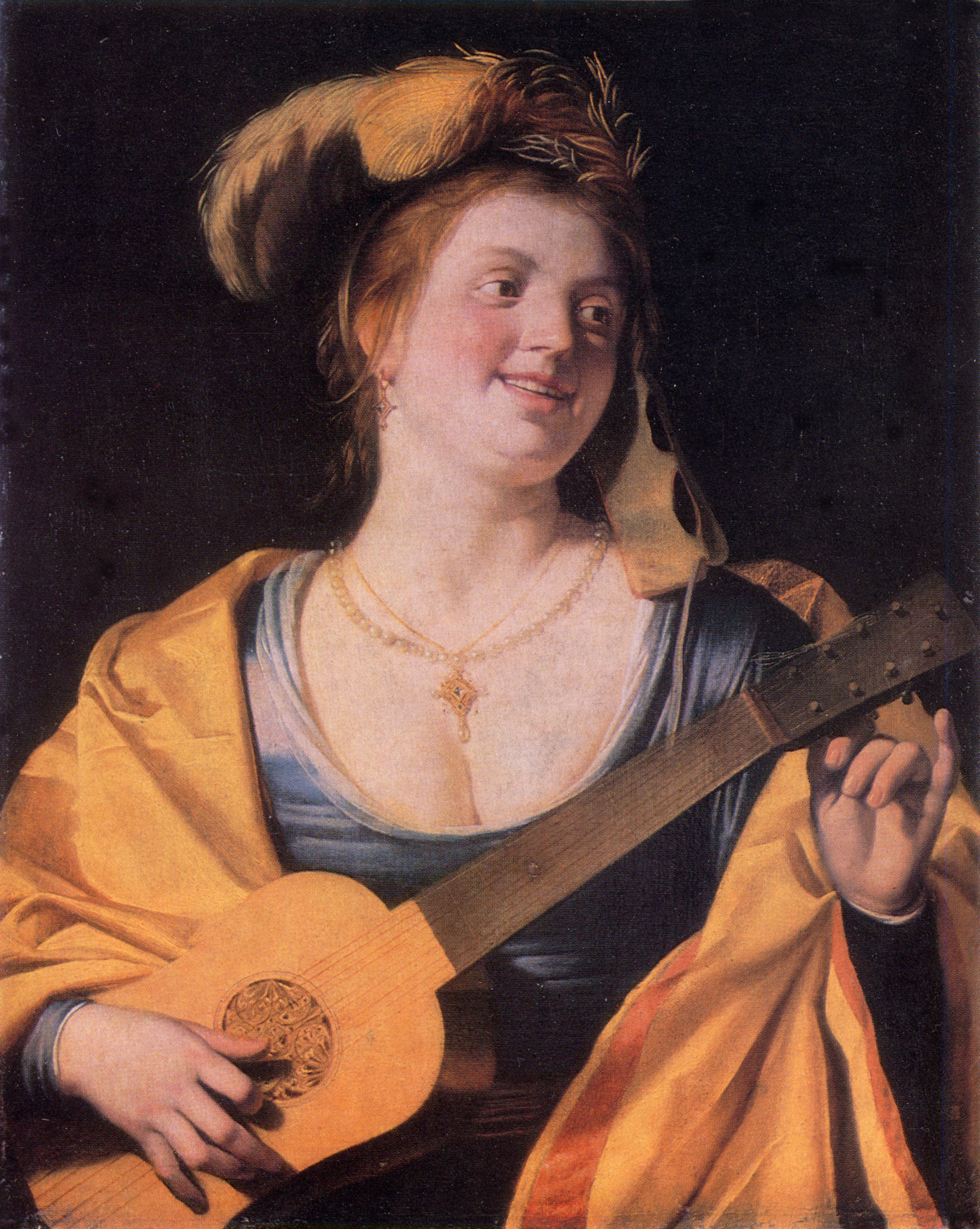
Gerard van Honthorst, Woman with a Guitar (1631) M. Korshitsky Lviv Art Gallery

==== Dutch and Flemish Collection ====
There are over 150 paintings of the Flemish and Dutch schools in the gallery’s collections. From Utrecht, the Adoration of the Three Wise Men, Anon., worthily represents the early art of the Netherlands .

Among the jewels of the collection are two still lives by Jan van Kessel, a student of Peter Paul Rubens, and a Still life with flowers by Abraham Brueghel, grandson of Jan Brueghel. Also on display are paintings by others of the Brueghel School, for example, a painting by Joseph van Bredael from the beginning of the 18th century. Pieter Neefs I, an associate of Frans Franken, is also represented.

There are two portraits by Gerrit van Honthorst, a follower of Caravaggio: Man with viola da gamba and Woman with a guitar (1631).

The Lviv Art Gallery collection also includes Saint Jerome by Lucas Gassel (1539), Portrait of a woman by Pieter Pietersz (1557), a group of paintings by Jakob de Backer, Venice, Bellona and Mary Magdalene and, two landscapes by Abraham Cowarts. There are also paintings from the Dutch Golden Age painting, for instance, The Storm by Pieter van der Croos and a still life by Jan Jansz van de Velde, A glass of wine and fruits (1639). The Lviv Art Gallery also possesses two battle scenes by the Flemish Pauwels Casteels, an artist who is a rarity in museums. The younger brother of the great Frans Hals, Dirk Hals, presents a canvas Banquet with the fun of a private company.

Other aspects of the art of the Netherlands of the 16th century are woven carpets - tapestries . Two tapestries from Brussels, depicting scenes from the Odyssey, are exhibited at another branch of the Gallery, Olesko Castle (Odyssey and Giant Polyphemus).

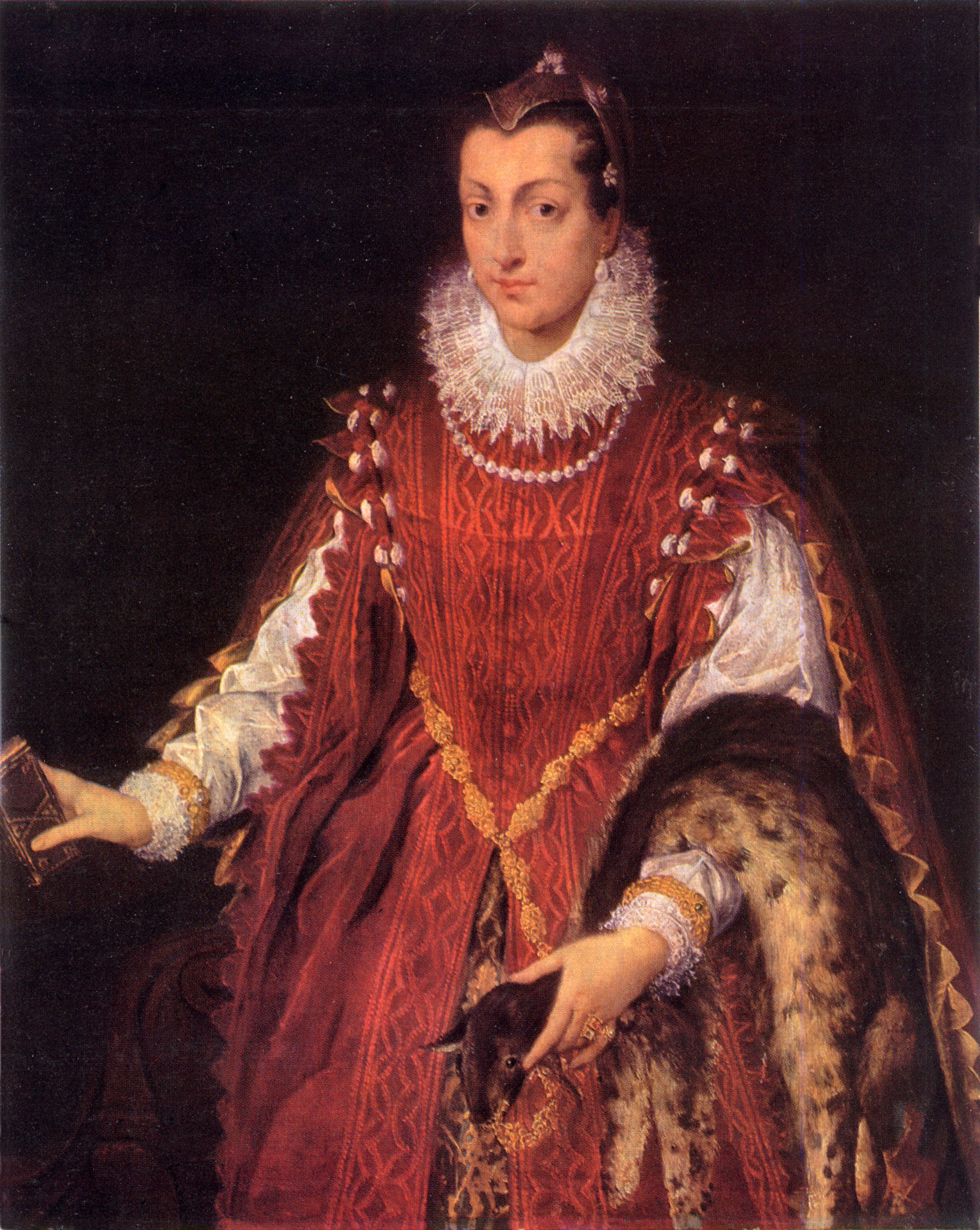
Sofonisba Anguissola, Portrait of a Noblewoman (c 1580) B, Voznytsky Lviv National Museum of Art

==== Italian Art ====
The collection's early Italian painting is limited: there is the Florentine "Madonna with Saints Mary Magdalene and John the Baptist, Anon., (14th c), the Umbrian work, "Madonna and Child with Catherine of Alexandria," Anon., (15th c), and a mourning portrait of Maria Ricci, painted on the end of a chest. The highlights here are the relief Three Crosses on Calvary, associated with the studio of sculptor Donatello and This Man! the work of Leonardo da Vinci 's student Andrea Solario.

The gallery is stronger in its Venetian paintings of the sixteenth century, with portraits by Titian, and including an image of the Venetian Doge during a visit to Odessa.

Marco Basaiti (c. 1470–1530) painted a portrait of an astronomer, more aristocrat playing with science than intellectual. One of the rare examples of nudity is the canvas Palma Vecchio Venus has fallen asleep. The artist Sofonisba Anguissola is represented by a portrait of an noblewoman. Only two paintings represent Jacopo Zucchi's "Pearl Hunts", one of them in Lviv. To Caravaggio 's circle belongs the canvas "Tortures of St. Sebastian. Bernardo Strozzi painted "The Apostle Peter Heals the Paralytic." "Landscape (landscape)" Alessandro Magnasco expands the range of Italian genres, where there are landscapes. "Landscape of the city of Dresden" by Bernardo Bellotto is a veduta, a landscape of the city.

Among the paintings of the history genre should be mentioned "Battle of the Fencers in Hungary" by Martino Altomonte, a German by birth, but from Italy, who worked in Zhovkva and Salzburg . The canvas being too large for the gallery premises in Lviv, it was decided to exhibit this painting at Zolochev Castle.

===== The Italian Gift =====
In 2012, the Department of Italian Art of the Borys Voznytsky Lviv National Art Gallery was replenished with paintings created by Italian masters in the second half of the 20th century. The paintings were transferred from Italy absolutely free of charge to create a permanent exhibition. This action took place as part of the "Days of Italy in Ukraine" - the project was launched by the Italian Chamber of Commerce in Ukraine. Participation included 15 contemporary Italian artists who donated about 30 paintings, including:

Roberto Bergonzo: Golden Sections, Yin and Yang
Andrea Boltro: Except When, Horizon
Maria Cristina Conti: Infinity, Infinity, New Beginning
Maria Joya Dal'allo: Borrowed Vase
Angelo Di Tommaso: White Rose, Gift to Canoe
Silvano D'Orsi: Vacation, Family
Federico Errante: cello painting and one untitled
Roberto Ferrari: Three Flowers, Flower Workshop
Ciro Palumbo: Dream, Leaving a Dream
Stefano Puleo: Summer Day, Fisherman's Holiday
Maurizio Stella: Dizziness, Motives for the zoo
Rodolfo Tonin: Suburbs, Pure Peace
Vittorio Varre: Etheric spaces, Thought
Antonio Zgarbossa: What do you want to tell me?, During rehearsals

==== Works of art of Spain ====
Among the exhibits is Jose de Ribera 's painting "St. Jerome" of the XVII century . And the XIX century is represented by paintings by Ignacio Zuloaga "The Spaniard on the Street" and the work of a master from the circle of Francisco Goya (?) - "Waving on the balcony."

== Branch Museums / Divisions ==
1. Lozinsky Palace, the main building, on 3 Stefanyka street
2. Potocki Palace, 15 Kopernyka street
3. Museum of Modernism
4. Boim Chapel, 1 Katedralna Square
5. Museum of Ancient Ukrainian Books, 15a Kopernyka street, near Potocki Palace
6. Rusalka Dnistrova Museum, 40 Kopernyka street
7. Church of St. John the Baptist, 1 Pidhirna street
8. Johann Georg Pinsel Museum, 2 Mytna street
9. Memorial Museum-workshop of Teodozia Bryzh, 5 Martovycha street
10. Mykhailo Dzyndra Museum of Modern Sculpture, 16 Muzeyna street, Briukhovychi
11. Olesko Castle, in Olesko
12. Pidhirtsi Castle, in Pidhirtsi
13. Markiyan Shashkevych Memorial Museum in Pidlyssia, Zolochiv Raion.
14. Zolochiv Castle Memorial Museum, in Zolochiv
15. Hetman Ivan Vyhovsky Museum, in Ruda, Stryi Raion.
16. Pyatychanska Tower, in Pyatychany, Stryi Raion
17. Museum of Zhydachiv Land, in Zhydachiv.

== History ==
=== Early years ===
The decision to establish a gallery of European art in Lviv was made by the Lviv city magistrates in 1897. In 1902, the first exhibits were organized, featuring artwork by contemporary local painters: Malczewski, Matejko, Jan Styka, Feliks Michał Wygrzywalski, and Edward Okuń.

In late 1906, the city made the decision to purchase the art collection of sugar magnate Jan Jakowicz, from nearby Sytkivtsi (Vinnitsya Oblast). Jakowicz's collection, some 2,000 art objects, included some 400 Western European paintings by Rembrandt, Rubens, Van Dyke, and Velasquez, among others from Spain, Italy, and France, and transformed the scope of the city collection from a local gallery into one of national, if not international, significance. This was a major purchase, with complex funding and political issues, including the complication that the city council was buying, at that time, across an international border: Sytkivtsi part of the Russian Empire, Lviv part of the Austro-Hungarian Empire. The collection was moved--"smuggled"—across the Zbruch River, then the border between Russia and Austria, and installed in the halls of the Lviv Art and Industry Museum..

The first public exhibit of the Jakowicz collection in Lviv, opening February 14, 1907, is considered to be the beginning of the museum.

In 1914, the purchase of the palace at 3 Ossolinskikh Street (now Stefanyka Street), and the former property of Lviv University professor, historian and collector Władysław Łoziński, brought the Gallery to a permanent address.

The newly created museum consolidated earlier donations, and, during World War I, was regarded as a safe haven from the looting occurring in the region. When Russian troops billeted on his estate in Kalnykiv, Bolesław Orzechowicz, a notable collector, asked City Hall to intervene and save his collection. It was transferred in 15 horse-carts to Lviv, and, after the war, in 1919, he formally bequeathed it.The Orzechowicz donation included paintings by Matejko, Juliusz Kossak, and Grottger. By this time, the collection had sufficient diversity to divide into three departments: Polish art, Western European art, and the Racławice Panorama.

In the 1920s and 1930s, with the region's continued political instability, accessions in this manner were to continue.

1938 marked another key year of expansion. Wary of the threat of war, local Polish aristocrats began again to deposit their collections with the gallery. Leon Piniński and Baron Konstanty Brunytsky/Brunicki made significant donations from their estates during this time.

=== World War II / Soviet Re-organization ===
Lviv was overswept by opposing armies during World War II. The Germans confiscated 150 paintings that were never returned. In 1940, the Soviets occupied Lviv and seized the gallery, along with the city's other major cultural institutions. In a major and brutal reorganization, the Soviet authorities decided to consolidate or simply close several of these institutions, including the Ossolineum, Baworowscy Library, Lviv's Historical Museum, the Lubomirski Museum and private collections of the Stauropean Brotherhood and the Dzieduszycki, Gołuchowski and Sapieha families. The gallery received parts of several of these collections, and was placed under the administration of the Ukrainian Academy of Arts.

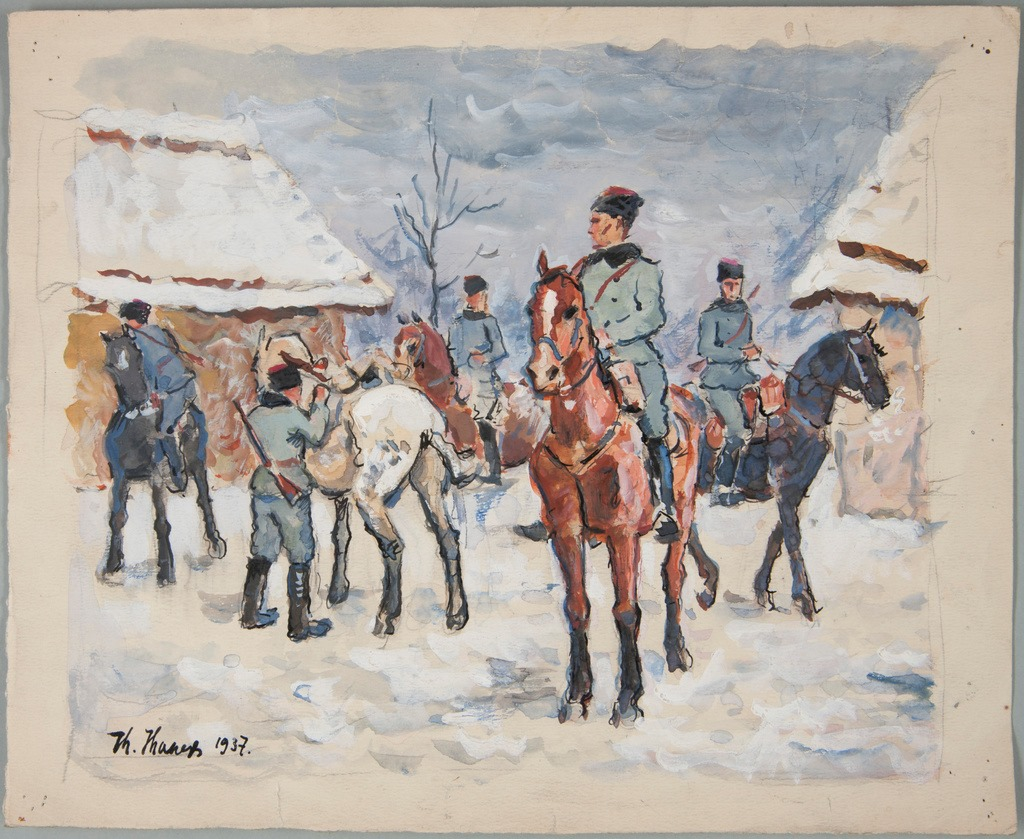
Ivan Ivanets (director, 1941–1944), Soldiers on Horseback, 1937

Ivan Ivanets was the gallery's wartime director, 1941–1944. In the war-time environment, Ivanets was able to accomplish little, Despite being a decorated war veteran, he ran afoul of the Soviet administration. In July 1944 Ivanets abandoned Lviv for Vienna. While traveling to Kracow in 1945, he was arrested by SMERSH and transported to Solikamsk (Perm Oblast, Russia), where he died on March 10, 1946. In 1952, 17 oil paintings by Ivan Ivanets from the gallery's collection were destroyed.

=== The Borys Voznytsky Directorship (1962–2012) ===
Borys Voznytsky has been called the "guardian angel" of Ukrainian museums and castles, cultural monuments of the Ukrainian people. When he assumed the directorship of the Lviv Art Museum in 1962, the museum boasted approximately 10,000 artifacts, but had been reduced in its exhibition space to a single room. Voznytsky, who had been awarded the Soviet Medal for bravery for his service to the army during World War II, did not shrink from the task of reviving the museum's mission as he saw it. For the next four decades, he would engage art historians, enthusiasts, and the general public to aid him and the museum in the preservation of some twelve thousand museum-worthy artifacts, which otherwise would have been destroyed as a part of the Soviet campaign against religion.

In 2005 the Lubomirski collection of 14th – 18th century European art was transferred to its new premises - the renovated Palace of Count Potocki, a former governor of Austrian Galicia. On October 23, 2009, the Lviv Art Gallery received national status in independent Ukraine. Following his death in a car crash in 2012, on April 12, 2013, the Lviv National Gallery of Arts added Voznytsky's name, in a gesture of respect.

== Current status ==
The museum is currently closed. On March 10, 2022. In response to the Russian invasion, staff and volunteers in Lviv have packed up and secured fragile artworks and precious historical materials as the Russian invasion of Ukrainian territory continues to the east. Plans are underway to evacuate Ukraine's cultural property in the besieged cities to the east.

"Today we see how Russia is shelling residential areas (and) even people that are evacuating," says National Museum Director of Lviv, Ihor Kozhan. "They guaranteed they wouldn't but now we can't trust them. And we need to take care of our heritage because this is our national treasure." ... "We are ready to help in any way we can, for all the museums in the country now in danger," said Kozhan, warning that even Lviv's many protected heritage sites may be targeted in the invasion.

In May 2022, plans were made to reopen galleries at the Lozinsky Palace, displaying temporary exhibits of Ukrainian art. "Putin now has the goal of turning Ukrainians into nobody, into nothing,” Director Taras Voznyak is quoted as saying, “In order to show that we are alive, we have opened several branches.”
