= Margit Sielska-Reich =

Polish-Ukrainian painter (1903–1980)

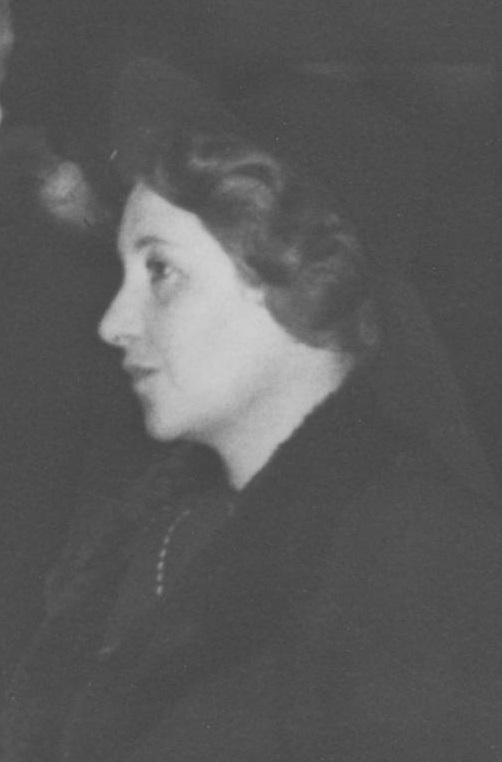
- Sielska-Reich in 1939
- Born: Margit Reich; 23 June 1900; Kolomyia, Kingdom of Galicia and Lodomeria, Austria-Hungary (now Ukraine)
- Died: 3 February 1980 (aged 79); Lviv, Ukrainian SSR, Soviet Union (now Ukraine)
- Occupations: Painter, graphic designer
- Style: Constructivism; Cubism; Surrealism; Socialist realism; Modernism

Margit Sielska-Reich (Ukrainian: Марія Сельська, romanized: Mariia Selska; 26 May 1900 – 3 February 1980) was a Polish-Ukrainian painter who worked in Lviv.

The daughter of Laura and Isaak Reich, she began studying painting at the Free Academy of Fine Arts in Lviv with Leonard Podhorodecki, Feliks Michał Wygrzywalski and Edward Pietsch. From 1920 to 1922, she continued her studies at the Academy of Fine Arts in Kraków with Ignacy Pieńkowski, Władysław Jarocki and Henryk Kunzek. From 1925, she studied at the Academy of Fine Arts in Vienna and then in Paris in the studios of Fernand Léger and Amédée Ozenfant. Léger's works in particular influenced her painting. In Paris, she met her future husband, a Lviv painter, Roman Sielski. In 1929, she returned with him to Lviv. Together with Roman, she was a co-founder of the Association of Artists and Designers " artes ". From 1930 to 1932, they participated in twelve exhibitions in Lviv, Ternopil, Stanisławów, Warsaw, Kraków and Łódź.

The influence of surrealism appeared in her paintings. She collaborated with the left-wing monthly " Sygnały ". In 1937, she visited Paris again. She spent the period of World War 2 in Lviv. In 1942 she was arrested by the Gestapo, with her father and brother and his wife, and was taken to the Lviv ghetto. She survived hiding in the studio of the painter Sascha Wynnytzky .

After the Second World War, she stayed with her husband in Lviv. She became a member of the art group Tow, and took part in exhibitions in Lviv, Kyiv and Moscow, most of them being portraits and natural landscapes. Most of her works are in Lviv in museums and private collections. Upon her death she was buried in Lyczakowski Cemetery.

== Work ==
Margit Sielska-Reich specialized in portraiture and painting landscapes. Much of her work was shown in exhibitions, and still is held in them to this day.
