= Wilhelm Leopolski =

Polish painter

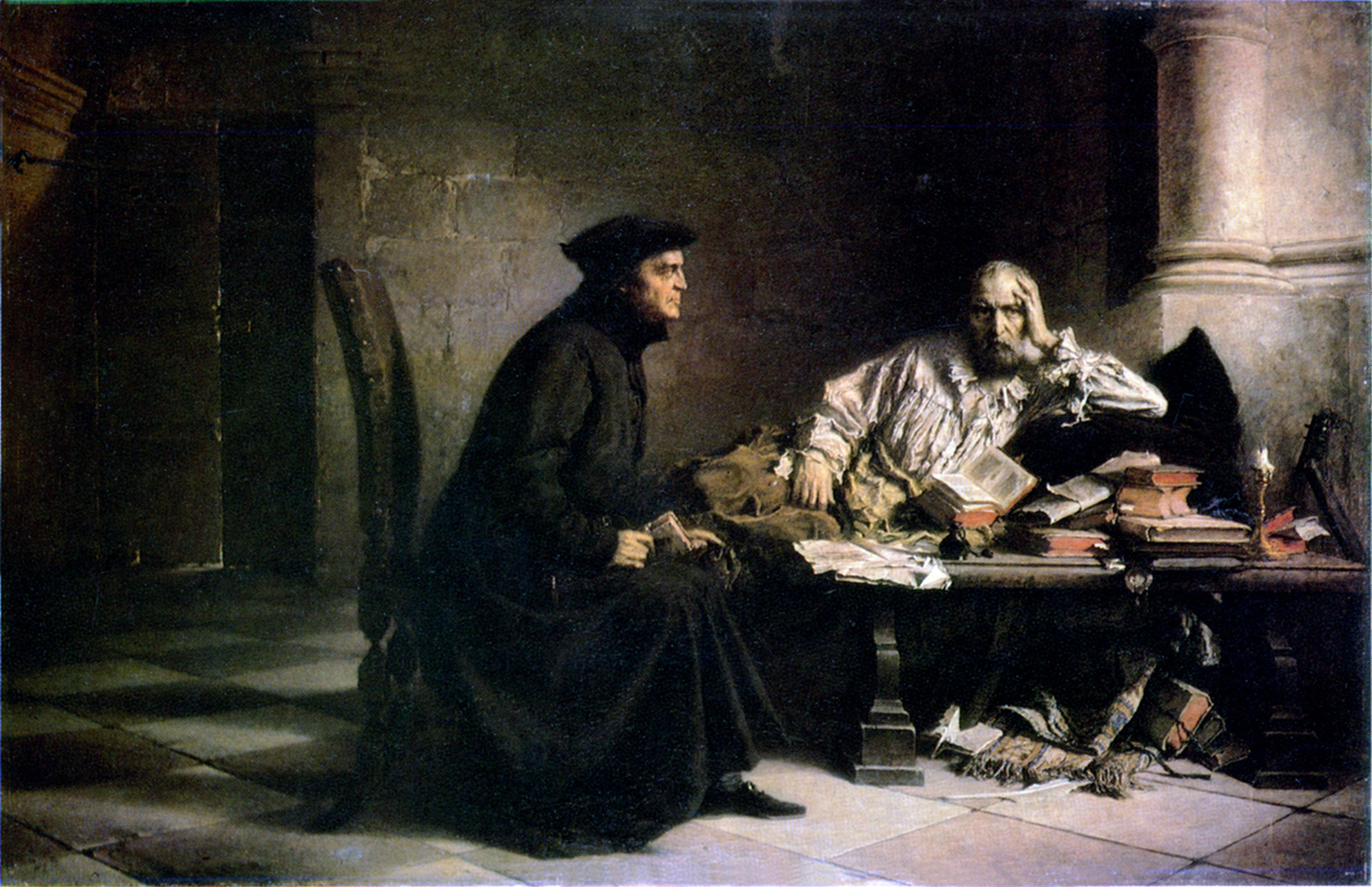
Wilhelm Leopolski, The Death of Acernus (Version II, 1865-7) Lviv National Art Gallery]

Wilhelm Leopolski (also Wilhelm Postel de Leopolski, Wilhelm Postel Edler von Leopolski) (May 5, 1828, in Drohobych – January 29, 1892, in Vienna) was a Polish painter.

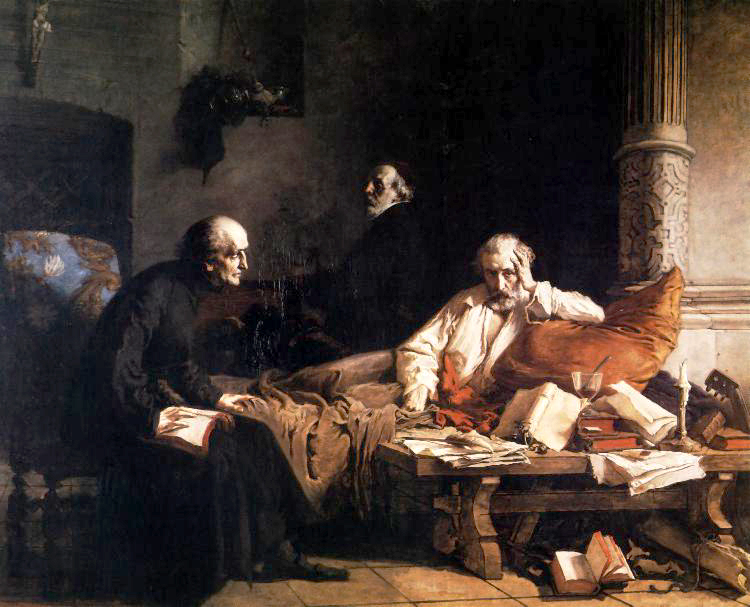
Wilhelm Leopolski, The Death of Acerna (version I, 1865-7) National Museum, Wrocław

== Early life ==
Wilhelm Leopolski was born in Drohobych, Lviv Oblast, in 1828, to a Polish noble family with Austrian roots. Initially destined for a career in law, he began studies at the Faculty of Law of the University of Lviv. After graduating, he turned to art, studying painting in the years 1853–1856 and 1858–1859 at the School of Fine Arts in Krakow with Wojciech Korneli Stattler and Władysław Łuszczkiewicz, then in the years 1860–1861 at the Academy of Fine Arts in Vienna with Christian Ruben. "In Vienna Leopolski also made a thorough study of the work of the Dutch and Venetian Old Masters."

He then moved to the Munich Akademie with Alexander (Sándor) von Wagner. After graduation (1862), he returned to the family home in Brody, where he withdrew from public during the period of the January Uprising, a widespread Polish rebellion sparked by the untimely imposition of a military conscription by the Russian Imperial Army. He spent this time painting a series of images of the Jews of Brody, "the realism of these genre paintings roused the respect of viewers." But there would be a social cost for his choice to withdraw into his work for this period.

== Career in art ==
Leopolski's œuvre was dedicated to specifically Polish subjects from his early years. This manifested in his early paintings as "sentimental genre paintings based on motifs from Polish rural life." His more mature work would include portraits of notable Polish intellligensia and history paintings of notable events from a Polish perspective. For the painters of Leopolski's generation, art was a patriotic mission, critical for the process of "shaping national historical awareness."

=== History painting and The Death of Acernus ===
The Death of Acernus, depicting the last moments of the life of the poet Sebastian Klonowic, is considered to be Leopolski's most important painting.

There are two versions, the earlier in the National Museum in Wrocław (1865–67) and the second in the Lviv National Art Gallery (1865–1867). In the Wrocław version, apart from the figure of a Jesuit confessor and the dying poet, the court physician of King Stefan Batory, Wojciech Oczko, appears. This painting is considered a treasure of Polish art, not merely for its compositional and technical mastery, but for its political symbolism, "despite the painting’s essentially realistic style, Leopolski was able to convey the symbolic idea of death and to provide a fascinating psychological study of the main figure." Leopolski struggled for two years over this painting, ultimately, "Dr. Oczko disappeared, giving way to the laws of composition." What remained was Leopolski's masterpiece monument to Polish intellectual achievement, situating Leopolski himself as an artist whose work comprised a defense of Polish autonomy and values.

=== Portraits ===
Beyond the history painting, Leopolski was admired for the realism of his work and his fine portraits, but the demands of satisfying wealthy clients were not suited to his temperament. In an infamous incident, Leopolski cut up his portrait of the key-keeper Gerwazy from Pan Tadeusz. The buyer was able to repair the canvas and remove the traces of destruction, but the impression of instability had been established.

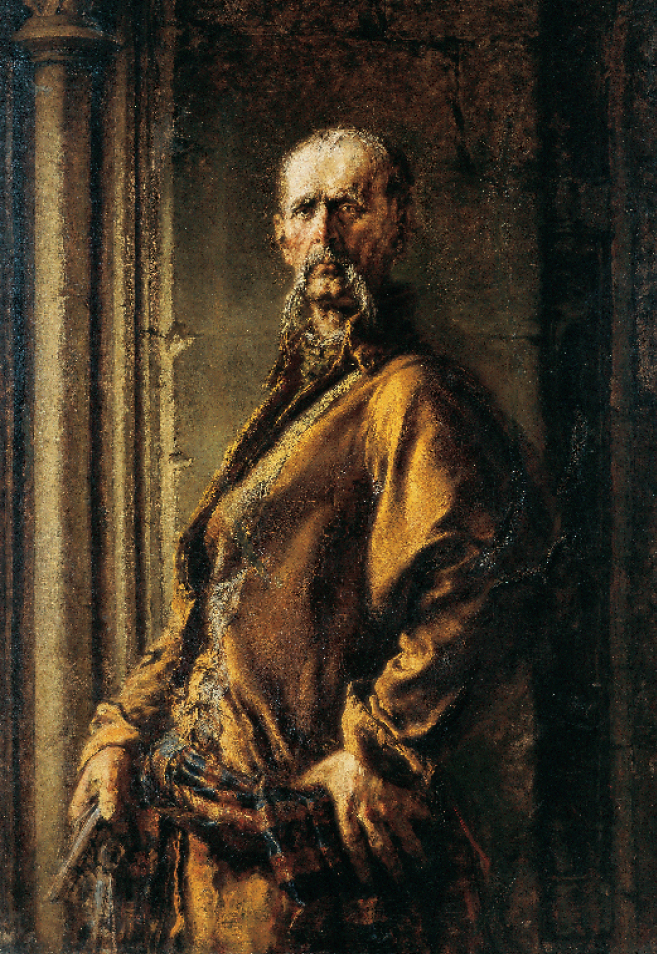
Gerwazy the Key-keeper

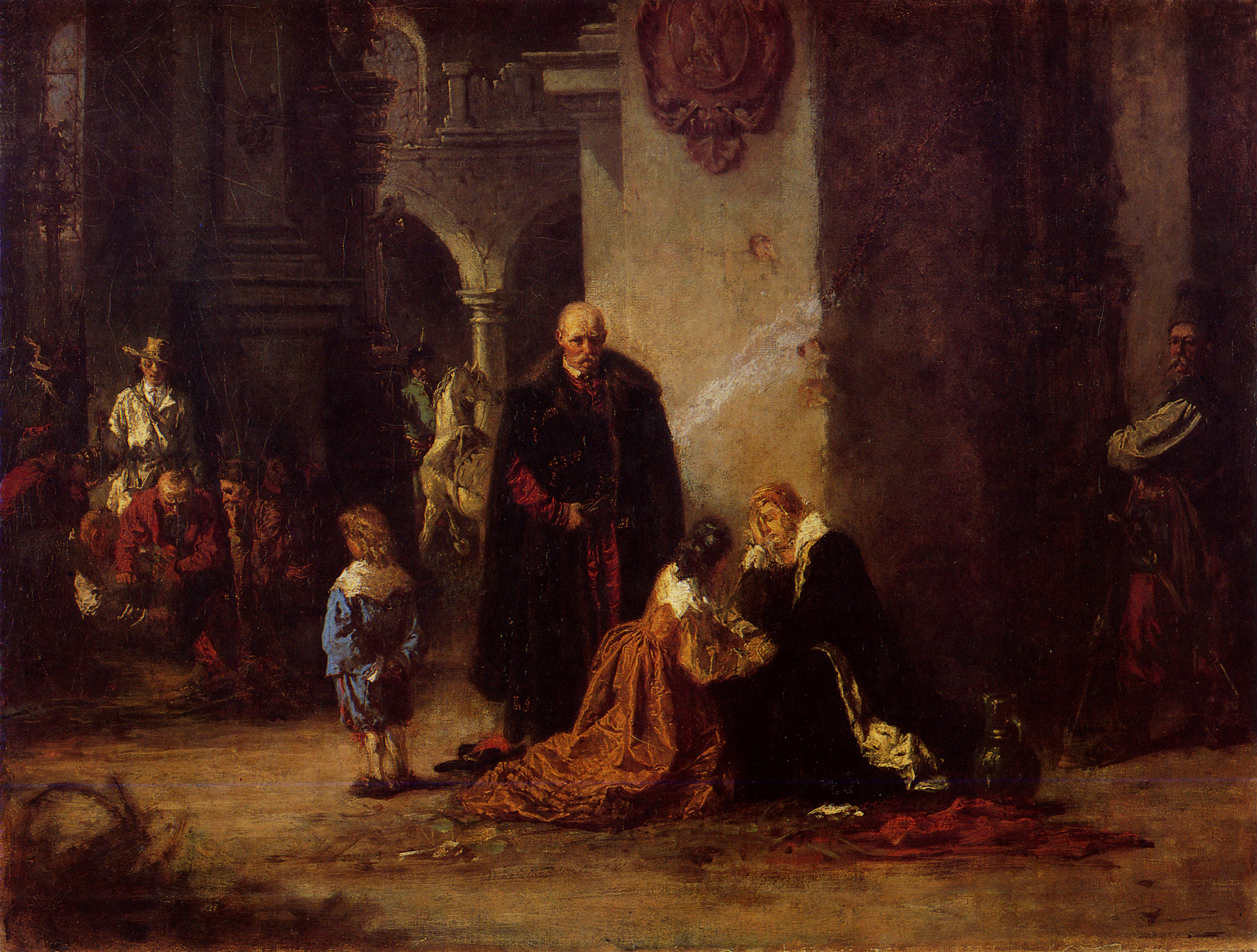
In Cossack Slavery (1876) National Museum in Lviv

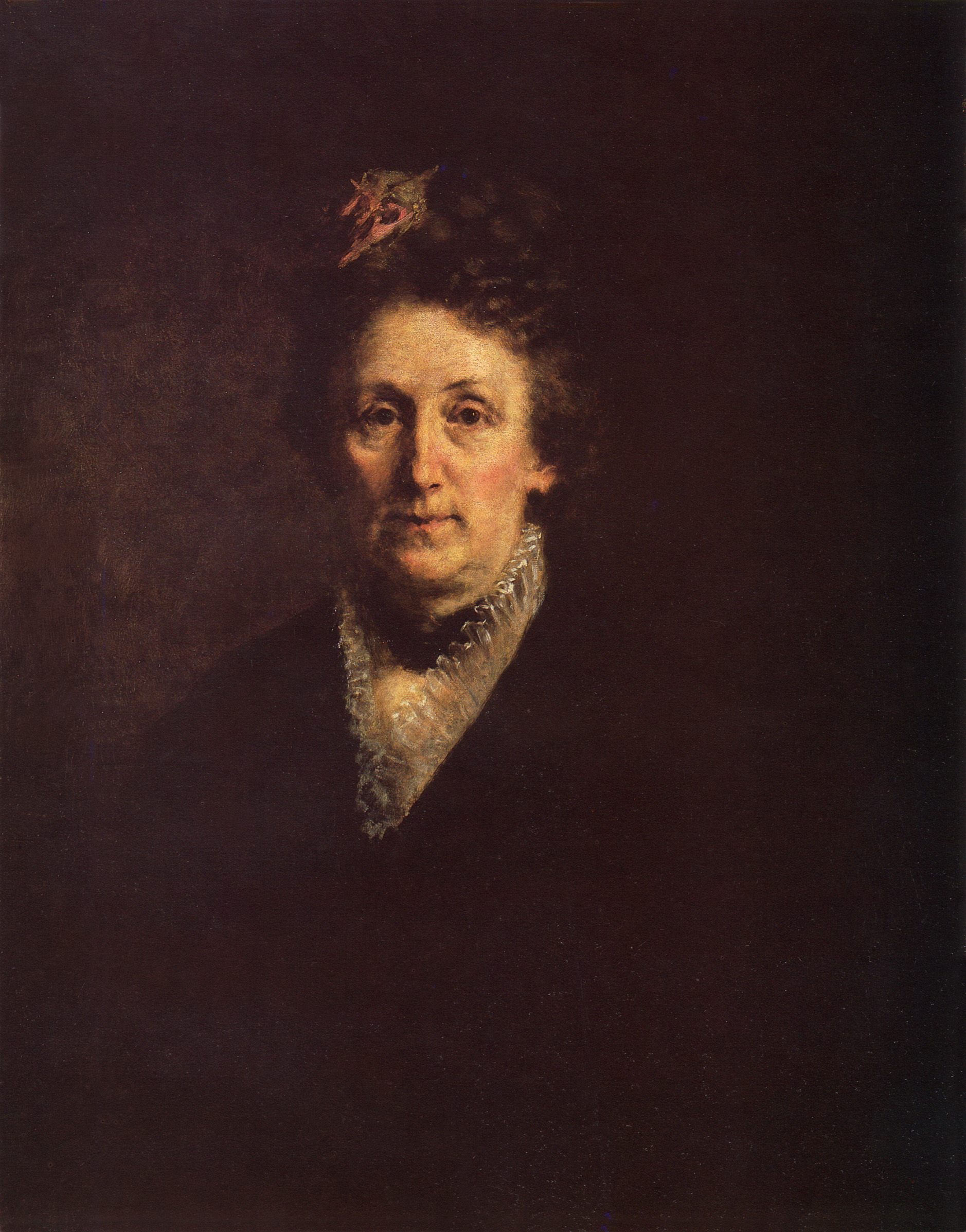
Portrait of Laury Fried (1875)

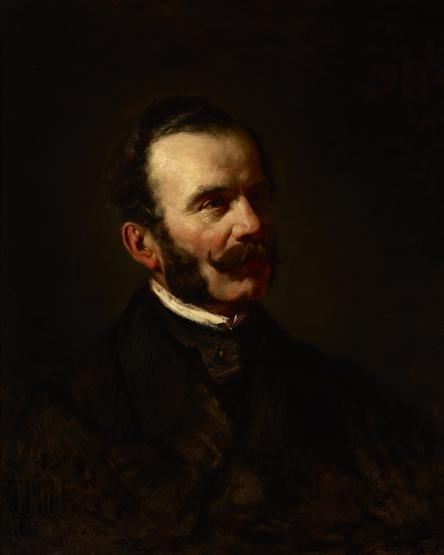
Portrait of Lucjan Siemieński, Kracow National Museum

== Legacy ==
Leopolski is described as a "forgotten artist," but his own erratic behavior contributed to his diminished reputation. His last years in Lviv were complicated by what can only be described as his personal vendetta against Jan Matejko, a popular Polish history painter ten years Leopolski's junior.

Leopolski's withdrawal from public affairs during the January Uprising rubbed uncomfortably against the dedication of his work to the idea of an independent Poland. The portraitist Jędrzej Bronisław Grabowski went so far as to publish a series of articles accusing Leopolski of working in the wrong genre, arguing that Leopolski leave the painting of historical images to other artists—artists, like Matejko who, if they had not directly participated in the January Uprising, had played an active role.

The older artist, who had fallen into financial hard times by the 1870s, ended up unsuccessfully trying to extort "100 Rhenish zlotys from Matejko." When, in 1878, Leopolski left Lviv and returned to Vienna, it was in disgrace, for having harassed a younger man whose work was becoming, to Leopolski's evident distress, more popular than his own.

Leopolski settled permanently in Vienna, beset by difficulties with his eyesight and a dwindling circle of supporters. He became known as "der Anfänger” (the beginner), for his unpleasant habit of taking money for commissions that were never completed. He died in penury, January 29, 1892 in Vienna, the best years of his painting life left far behind.
