= Teodozia Bryzh =

Ukrainian sculptor (1929–1999)

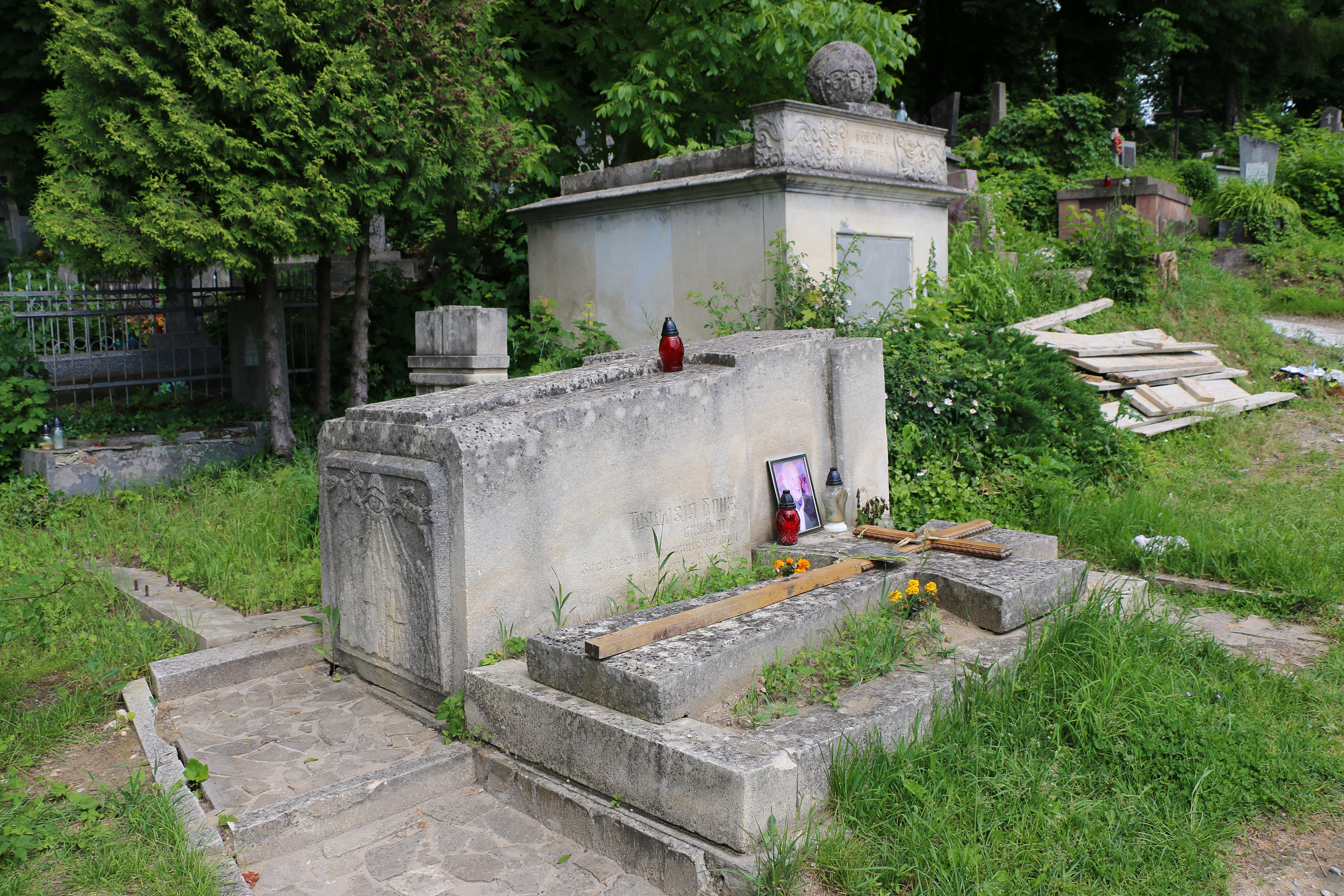
Teodozia Bryzh' tomb at Lychakiv Cemetery

Teodozia Markivna Bryzh (18 February 1929 – 4 July 1999) was a Ukrainian sculptor, an Honored Artist of Ukraine (1997), and a member of the Union of Artists of the USSR.

== Life ==
Teodozia Bryzh was born on 18 February 1929 in the village Berezhnytsia, Sarny district. Bryzh graduated from Sarny Gymnasium. In 1954, she graduated from the Lviv Institute of Applied and Decorative Arts. Among her teachers are Ivan Severa and Leopold Levitsky. Bryzh lived and worked in Lviv.

== Career ==
Bryzh created more than two hundred sculptures, among them are monuments, tombstones, memorial plaques, decorative and park sculptures. Bryzh's series of works based on The Forest Song by Lesia Ukrainka are of significant interest.

Bryzh realized many art projects with her husband Yevhen Beznisk, a monumental and graphic artist from Lviv. The couple decorated the memorial cemetery of the Sich Riflemen on Mount Makivka, the memorial chapel to the victims of the People's Commissariat for Internal Affairs (NKVD) in Zolochiv Castle, the monument to Danylo Halytsky, and Vasylko Romanovych, built in Volodymyr-Volynsky.

The sculptures of Bryzh are characterized by plasticity, elegance, and lightness. Bryzh was one of the first sculptors in Ukraine to follow the path of contemporary world art in the 1960s.

Teodozia Bryzh died on 4 July 1999 in Lviv. She is buried in Lychakiv Cemetery.

== Commemoration ==
There is a memorial museum of Bryzh on 5, Martovycha Street in Lviv. A street in Rivne is named after Teodozia Bryzh.

== Selected works ==
- Memorial complex in memory of the victims of fascism in Volodymyr-Volynskyi. Co-authors sculptor Yevhen Dzyndra, architect Yaroslav Nazarkevych. Built in 1965, reconstructed in 1985.
- Monument to Soviet soldiers in the village of Khorobriv (1975)
- Monument to Yuri Velykanovych on Myshuha Street in Lviv (1982, architect Lydia Lesova)
- Tombstones of Solomiya Krushelnytska, Ivan Krypyakevych, Leopold Levytsky, Oleksa Shatkivsky at Lychakiv Cemetery in Lviv
- Chapel-monument to the victims of communist repressions (1995, castle park in Zolochev; co-authored with sculptor Vasyl Kamenshchyk, artists – Eugene and Yarema Bezniska)
