= Edward Okuń =

Polish painter

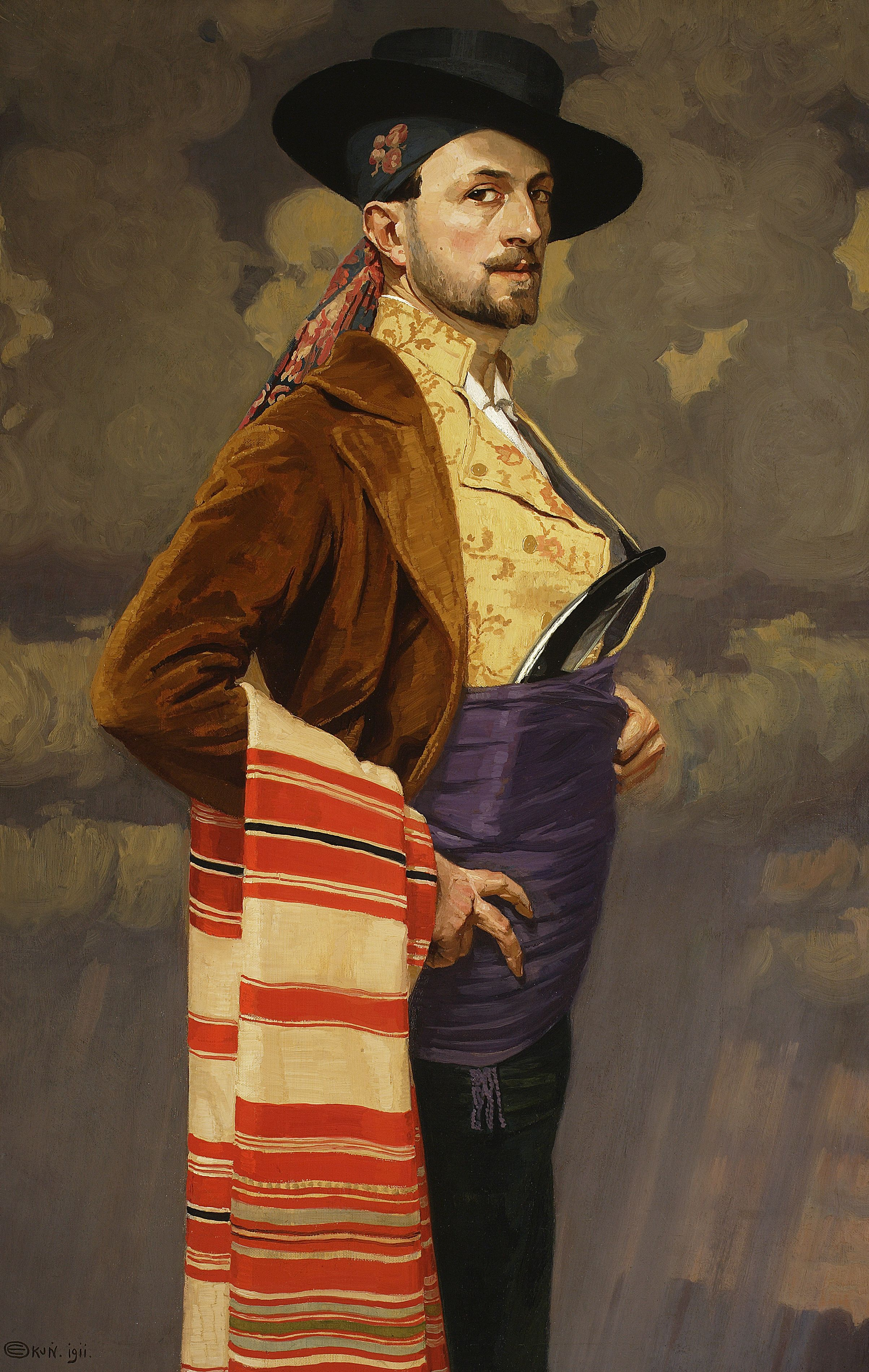
Autoportrait in Spanish costume, 1911

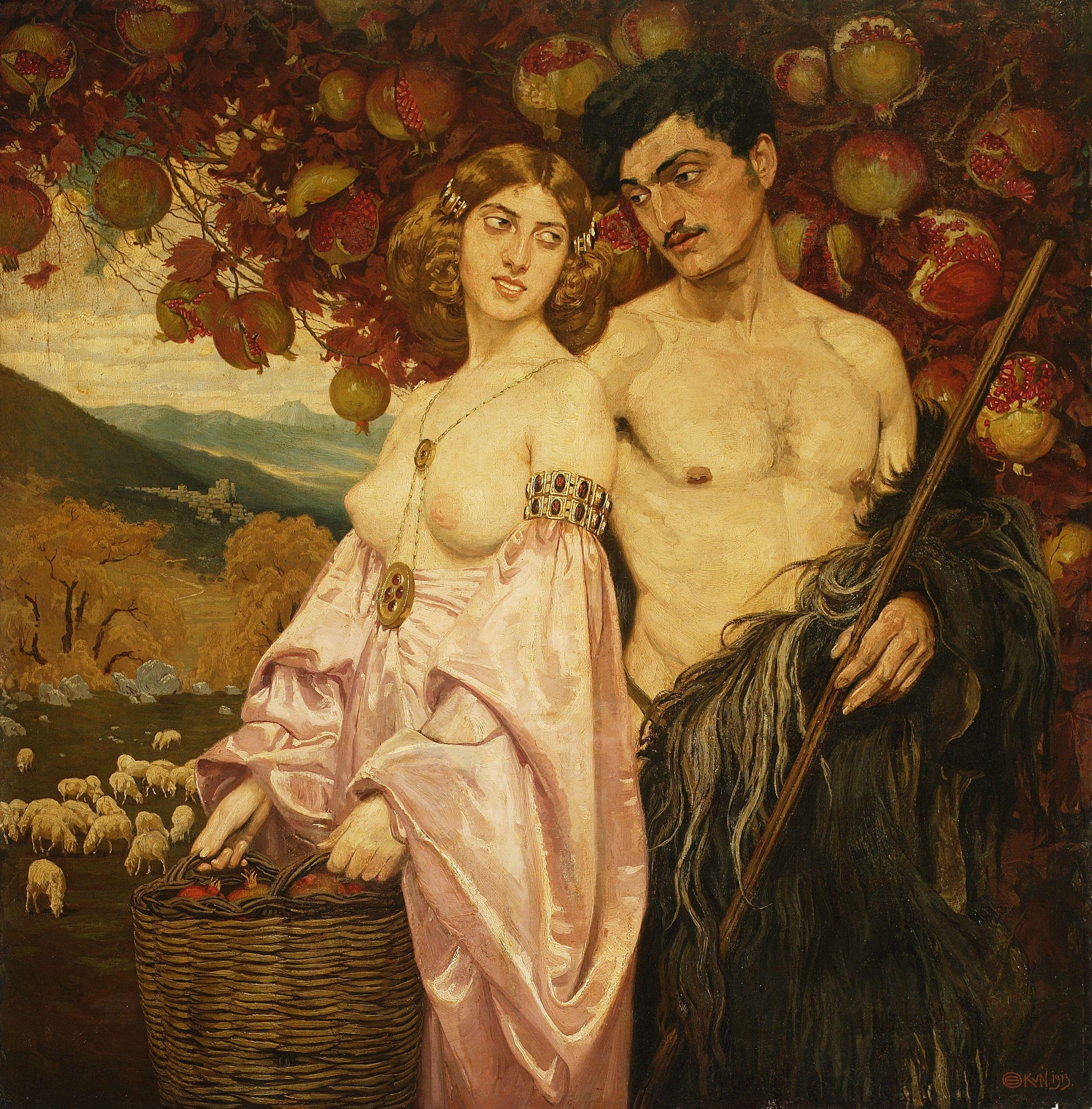
Self-portrait (1913), National Museum in Warsaw

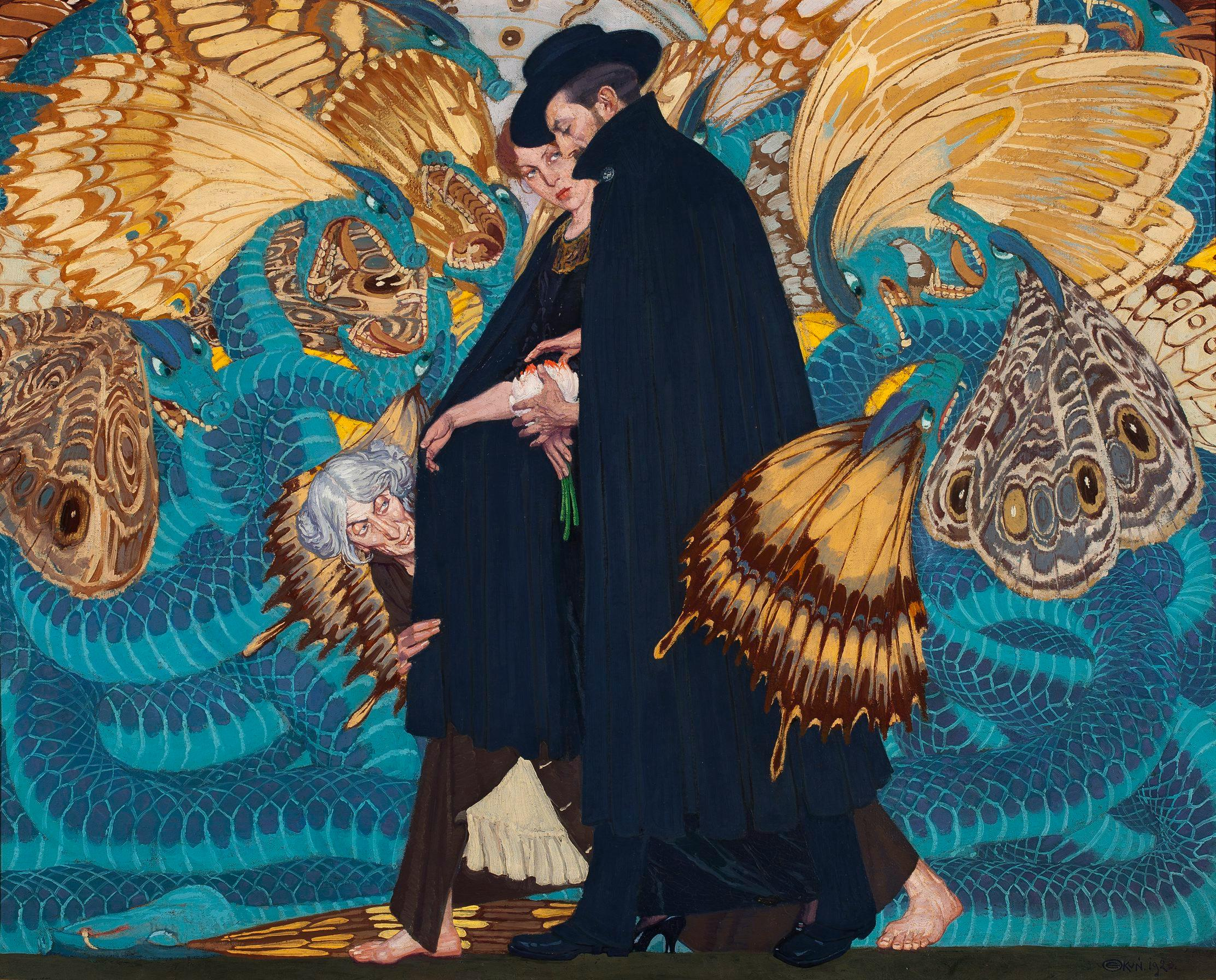
The War and Us (1917–1923), National Museum in Warsaw

Edward Okuń (1872–1945) was a Polish Art Nouveau painter and freemason. He painted landscapes, portraits, designed covers and illustrated magazines, including the German magazine Jugend. In his younger years he also competed as a racing cyclist in the Kingdom of Poland.

== Biography ==
Okuń was born in 1872 to a noble family and was orphaned early. He grew up with his grandparents on the maternal side. After inheriting a large fortune, he soon began drawing lessons with great painters. In 1891 he studied at the Warsaw School of Drawing. From 1891 to 1893 he studied under the direction of Isidore Jablonski and Jan Matejko at the Jan Matejko Academy of Fine Arts. He continued his studies in Munich and Paris. In 1897 Okuń went to study with Simon Hollósy who founded the Nagybánya artists' colony. For the next 20 years he lived in Rome and also traveled to Sorrento, Amalfi, Capri, Venice, Padua, Ravenna, Florence and Siena. He participated in the life of the Polish art colony in Rome, and was co-founder of the Masonic lodge "Polonia".

Okuń returned to Poland in 1921 and settled in Warsaw. From 1925 he was a professor in the School of Fine Arts. He was a member of the Society of Polish Artists. Together with his friends founded a Masonic lodge called "Copernicus". He was vice-president of the Society for the Encouragement of Fine Arts. During the annual opening of the Salon Incentives he witnessed the assassination of the first president of Poland, Gabriel Narutowicz, by Eligiusz Niewiadomski. He helped apprehend Niewiadomski, along with one of the president's aides.

During World War II he lived in Warsaw. After the Warsaw Uprising Okuń moved to Skierniewice, where he was killed by stray bullet in January 1945.

== Art ==
In his paintings there are themes of a woman with long, wavy hair in Renaissance dresses which his wife posed for. He made the front wall murals of his own house at the Old Town Square.

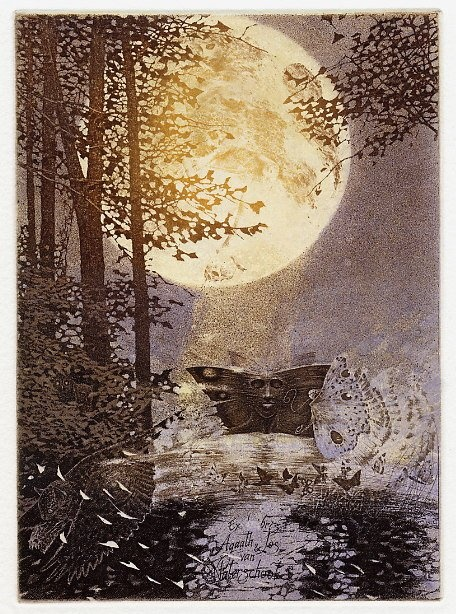
Night butterflies

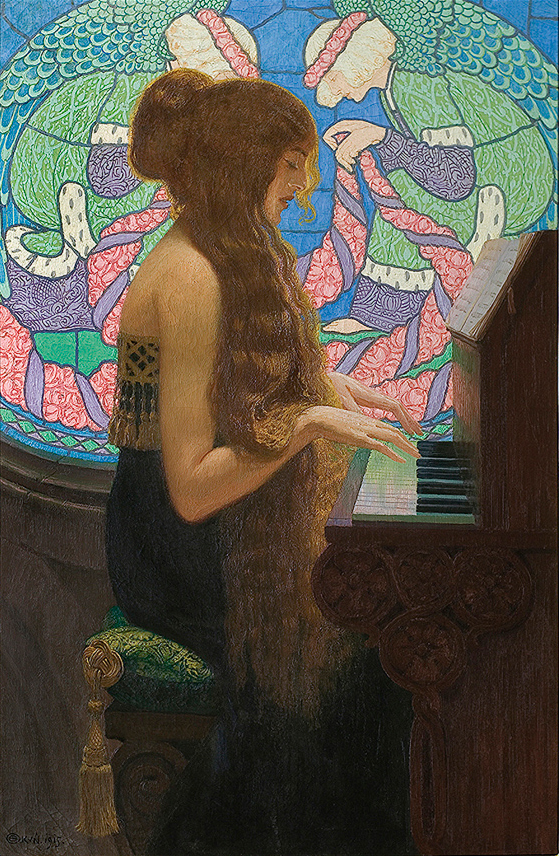
Musica sacra (1915)

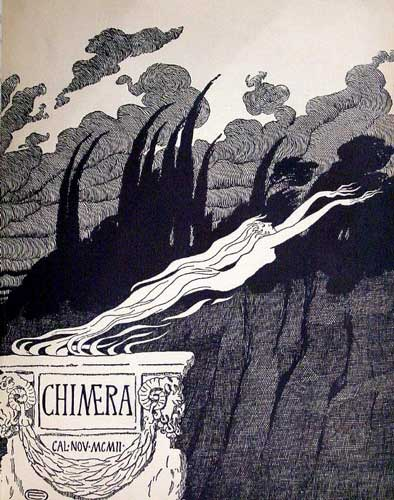
Chimera cover (1902)

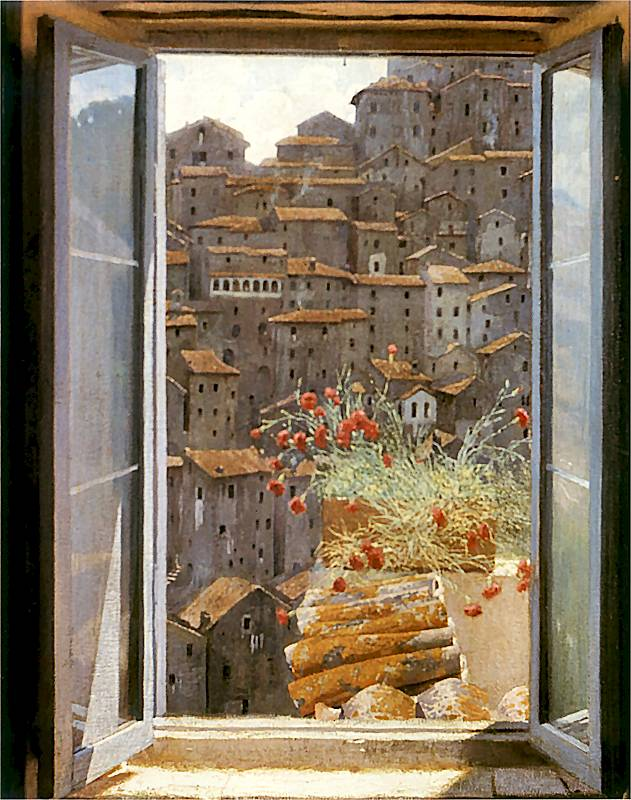
Window view (1905)
