= Władysław Jarocki =

Polish painter (1879–1965)

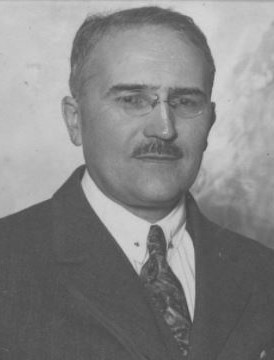
Władysław Jarocki

Władysław Jarocki (6 June 1879 – 7 February 1965) was a Polish explorer and painter born in Ukraine, then Austria-Hungary. He competed in the art competitions at the 1928 Summer Olympics. Most of his artwork was concerned with the Polish Highlanders, the Gorals.

== Biography ==
Son of Vladimir and Franciszka (née Rogowska). Graduate of the C. K. V Gymnasium in Lviv. He studied at the Lviv Polytechnic, and then from 1902 until 1906 at the Academy of Fine Arts in Cracow and in Paris. He was a pupil of Józef Mehoffer and Leon Wyczółkowski. From 1921 to 1939 he was a professor at the Academy of Fine Arts in Cracow.

He painted landscapes, folk and religious rituals, figures in regional costumes. He also painted during numerous trips (Hutsul region since 1904, Caucasus 1907, Podhale and Tatra Mountains since 1907, Baltic coast since 1922, Italy, etc.). Jarocki also created caricatures. He designed the sarcophagus of Jan Kasprowicz, and his paintings are also in the church in Harenda. In 1928, two of his works – Self-Portrait on Skis and Portrait of Jerzy Zulawski in the Mountains – were entered in the Olympic Competition for Art and Literature at the Amsterdam Games, but neither was awarded an honorable mention.
