= Feliks Michał Wygrzywalski =

Polish painter (1875–1944)

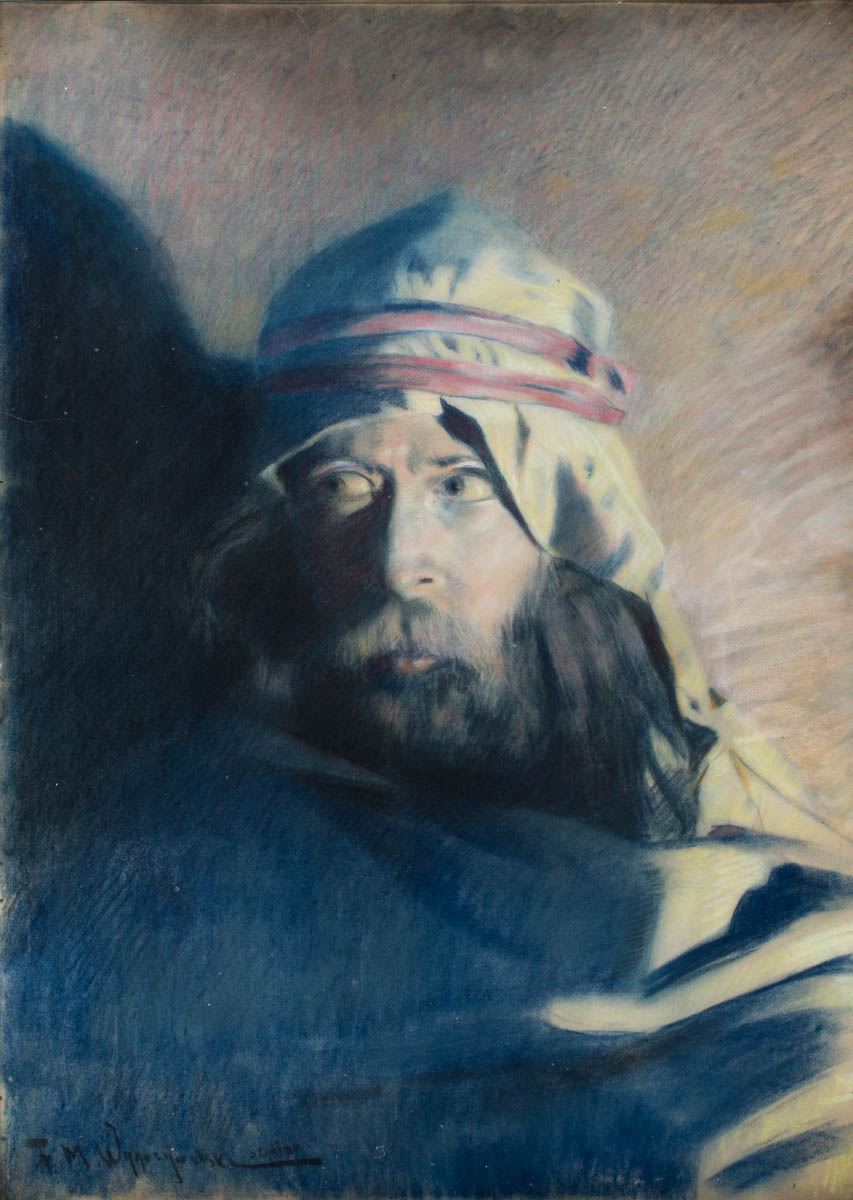
Self-portrait (date unknown)

Feliks Michał Wygrzywalski (20 November 1875, Przemyśl – 5 September 1944, Rzeszów) was a Polish painter remembered primarily for his Orientalist scenes and portraits. He also created a significant number of nudes. His son, Feliks Kazimierz Wygrzywalski, was also a painter.

== Biography ==
Thanks to a scholarship from the Malinowski Foundation, Wygrzywalski was able to study at the Academy of Fine Arts Munich from 1893 to 1898. This was followed by some time at the Académie Julian in Paris and a study trip to Italy.

In 1900, he settled in Rome and married a local woman named Rosa Imassa. His studies there consisted largely of copying the Old Masters, but he also created landscapes and nudes. Later, he provided illustrations for the Polish travel magazine, Wędrowiec (The Wanderer), as well as magazines in Germany and Russia.

In 1906, he visited Egypt, creating numerous paintings and sketches for later use. When he came back to Poland in 1908, he lived in Lviv ("Lwów," in Polish; now in Ukraine), where he had been commissioned to paint murals at the Chamber of Commerce and Industry. He also did some stage designs. During World War I, he moved to Rostov-on-Don and became a drawing professor. He returned to Lviv when the war was over.

Wygrzywalski was a frequent participant in exhibitions, but his first personal showing came only in 1932, at the local "Society of Friends of the Fine Arts". During this period, his major work was a series of fourteen paintings, depicting the history of dance, for the sanatorium at the health resort in Krynica-Zdrój. For most of his later life, he maintained his own art salon in Lviv called, in German, Kunstaustellung (art exhibit). During the post-war depression, many upper-class people sold their paintings there.

In July 1944, at the approach of the Red Army, he was forced to flee Lviv, leaving all of his possessions behind. He found refuge at a tenement house in Rzeszów, but died only a few months later from a stroke, which was possibly the result of an injury he suffered while fleeing. He was buried at the local cemetery, but his grave has not survived.

Wygrzywalski's works may be seen at numerous museums throughout Poland and Ukraine. In 2012, the city of Łódź organized an exhibition called "Between Capri and Lviv - painting travels by Feliks Michał Wygrzywalski". The following year, the National Maritime Museum, Gdańsk, presented some of his works as part of a series on Polish artists and the sea.

== Selected paintings ==
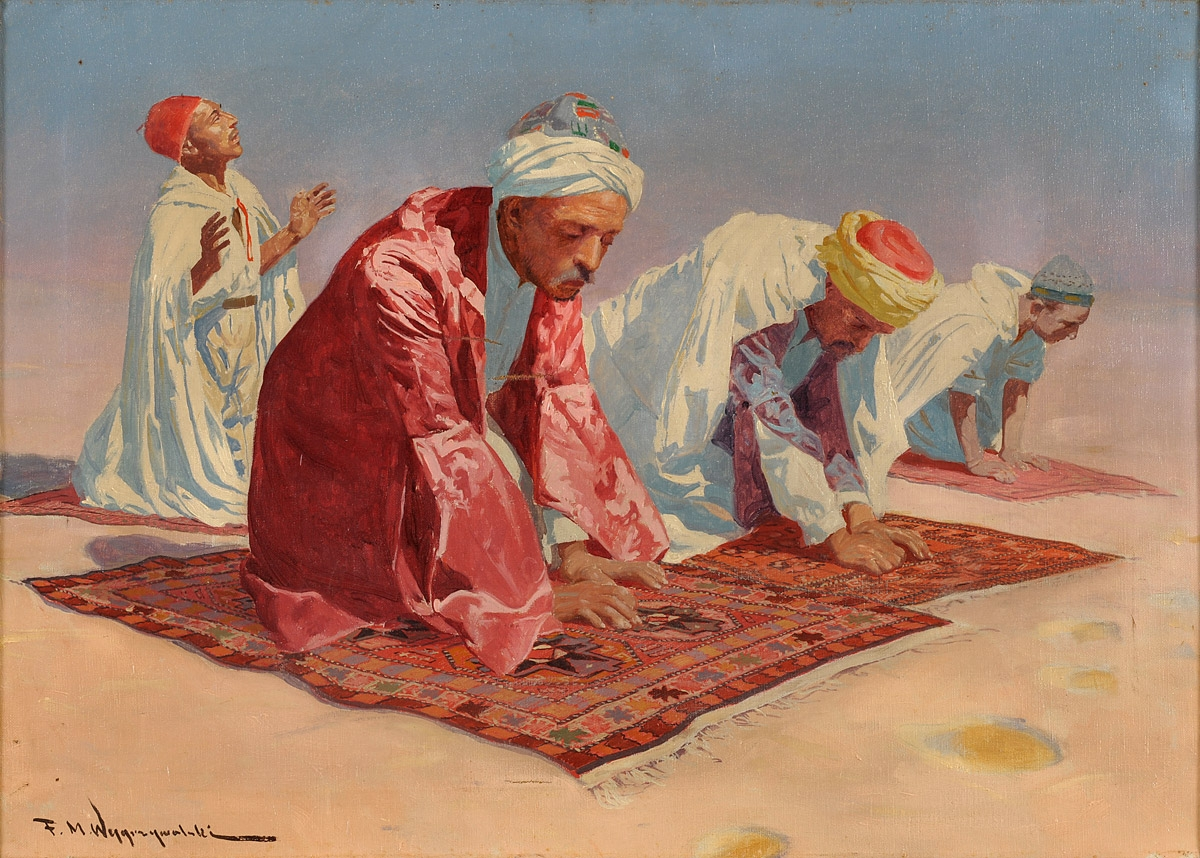
Muslims in Prayer

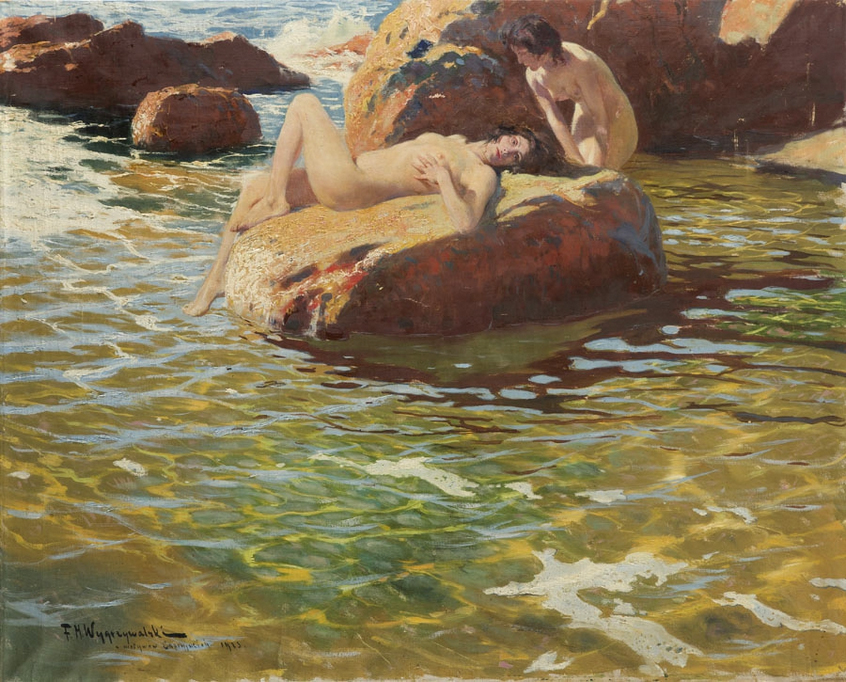
A Motif from Capri

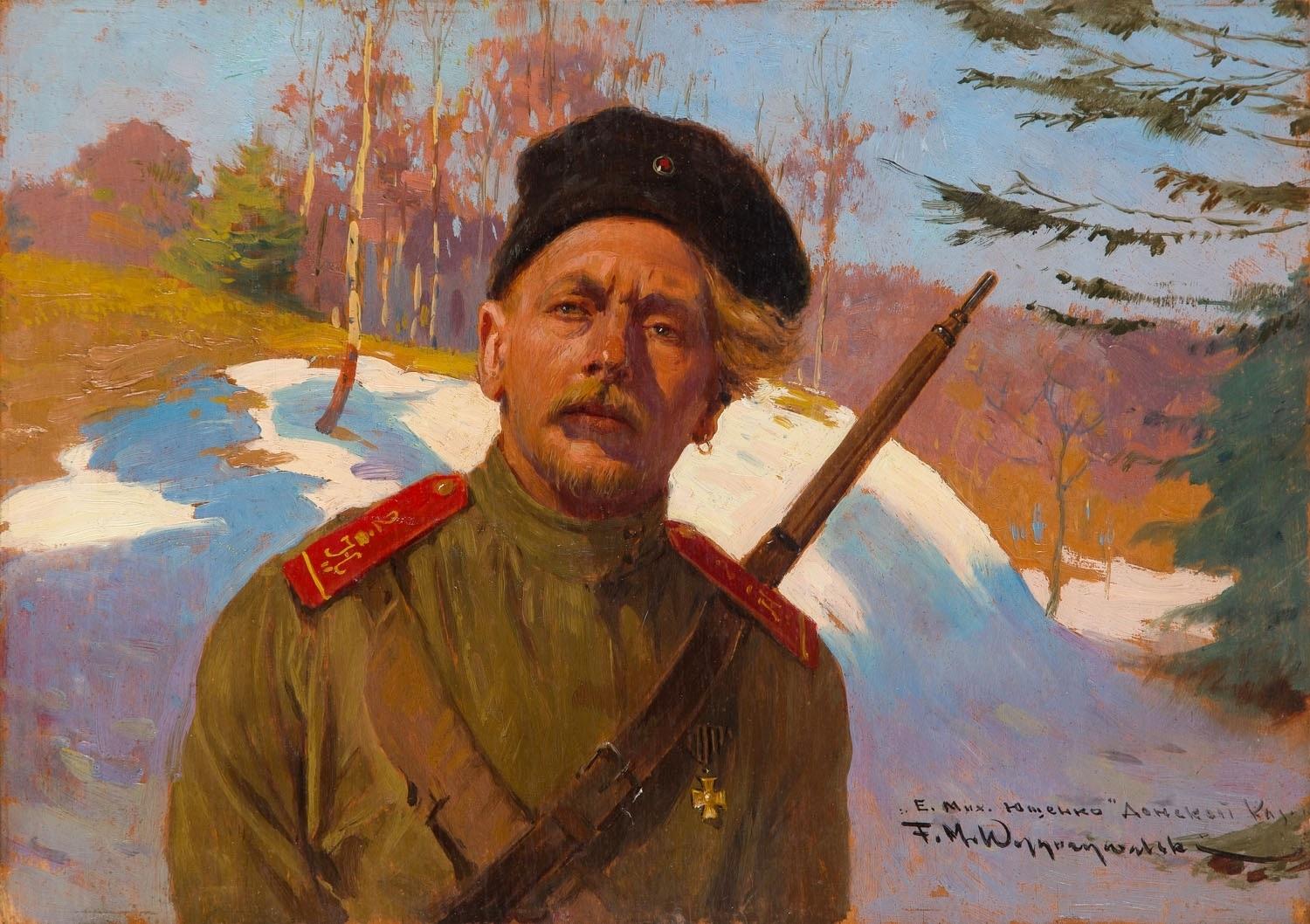
Portrait of a Don Cossack

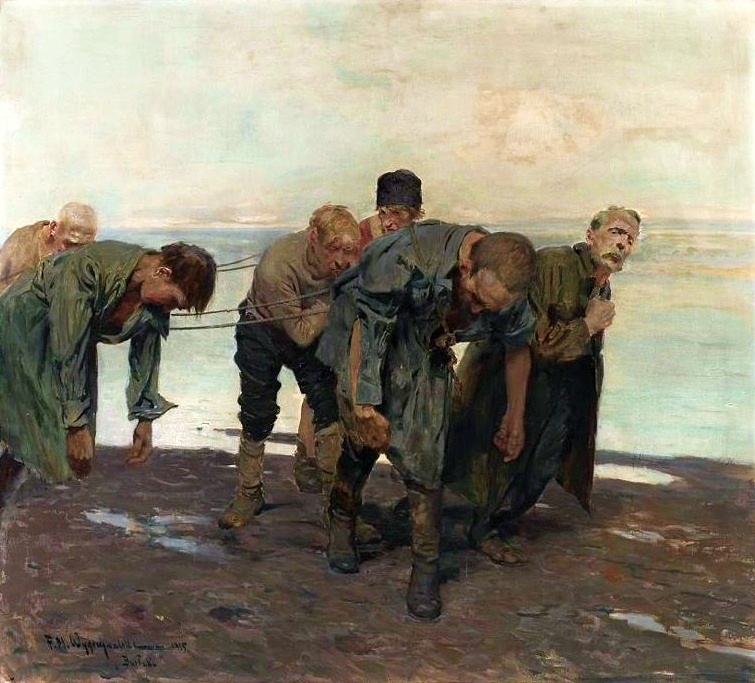
Barge Haulers
