= Ihor Kovalevych =

Ukrainian ceramist (born 1953)

- Ігор Васильович Ковалевич
- Born: 24 January 1953 (age 73)
- Education: Lviv Institute of Applied and Decorative Arts
- Occupation: Сeramist

Ihor Kovalevych (Ukrainian: Ігор Васильович Ковалевич; born 24 January 1953) is a Ukrainian ceramist and a member of the National Union of Artists of Ukraine (1987). He is husband to Liudmyla Kovalevych.

== Biography ==
Ihor Kovalevych was born on 24 January 1953, in Sokilnyky, now part of the Sokilnyky Hromada, Lviv Raion, Lviv Oblast, Ukraine.

In 1975, he graduated from the Lviv Institute of Applied and Decorative Arts, where his mentors in his specialization were Vitalii Maksymenko and Zenovii Flinta. From 1975 to 2006, he worked at the Lviv Experimental Ceramic and Sculptural Factory (collaborating with Pēteris Martinsons). Currently, he is engaged in creative work.

He lives and works in Lviv.

== Creativity ==
Starting in 1975, Ihor Kovalevych began participating in regional, national, and international exhibitions. Solo exhibitions of his work have been held in Kyiv (1993, 1995, 1998, 2005) and Düren, Germany (2005).

He works in the fields of decorative and applied ceramics and painting. In his ceramic pieces, he uses stoneware clay, and for chamotte, he incorporates enamel and engobe. Individual works are preserved in the collections of the National Folk Decorative Art Museum, the Khmelnytskyi Regional Art Museum, the World Ceramic Center (Incheon, South Korea), the Keramion Museum (Frechen, Germany), the Museum of Ceramics (Bolesławiec, Poland), the National Museum (Meštrović Pavilion) (Zagreb, Croatia), and the Center for Contemporary Art (Cairo, Egypt).

Among important works:

- Decorative compositions: "Zamorozky", "Tsvit paporoti" (both 1980), "Hnizdo leleky", "Ranok", "Doroha dodomu", "Zhaivoronky" (all 1981), "Kometa Halleia" (1985), "Znaky na dorozi" (1986), "Dvi vezhi", "Bile ta chorne" (both 1998), "Ozera", "Chovny" (both 2000), "Vtecha v Yehyptet"(2001), "Tuman", "Sestry" (both 2007), "Zymovyi sad" (2008);
- Decorative reliefs: "Vikna" (1997);
- Spatial sculpture: "Protsesiia" (2000).

== Awards ==
- Prize of the IV International Triennial of Mini Ceramics (1993, Split, Croatia);
- prize of the III International Biennial of Art Ceramics (1996, Egypt);
- second prize of the V International Biennial of Art Ceramics (1997, Split, Croatia);
- prize of the III International Biennial of Art Ceramics (1996, Egypt);
- second prize of the V International Biennial of Art Ceramics (1997, Portugal);
- Politeo Prize of the V International Triennial of Mini-Ceramics (1997, Croatia);
- Jury Prize of the International Biennial of Art Ceramics (1999, Portugal);
- Grand Prix of the exhibition-competition of art ceramics "KeramPIK in Opishnia! " (2010, Opishnia, Poltava Oblast);
- first prize of the IV International Ceramics Competition (2016, Ascoli Piceno, Italy).

== Bibliography ==
- Kovalevych Ihor Vasylovych / H. H. Stelmashchuk // Encyclopedia of Modern Ukraine [Online] / Eds. : I. М. Dziuba, A. I. Zhukovsky, M. H. Zhelezniak [et al.] ; National Academy of Sciences of Ukraine, Shevchenko Scientific Society. – Kyiv : The NASU institute of Encyclopedic Research, 2013.
- Голубець О. Львівська кераміка. — Київ: Наукова думка, 1991.
- Чегусова З. Декоративне мистецтво України кінця ХХ століття. 200 імен: Альбом-каталог. — К., 2002.
- Невкрита Ж. Кераміка тонкощів Ігоря Ковалевича // Культура і життя. — 2018. — No. 7 (16 лют.). — С. 13. — ISSN 4820-1579.
