= List of Ukrainian sports figures killed during the Russo-Ukrainian war =

Since 2014, the Russo-Ukrainian war and especially the 2022 Russian invasion of Ukraine have resulted in the deaths of thousands of Ukrainian civilians, including nearly 600 Ukrainian athletes.

== List ==
Name	Sport	Date of birth	Date of death	Ref.
Kostiantyn Ahapov	Sambo, mixed martial arts (MMA)	1987	10 January 2023	
Oleksandr Akinin	American football	28 August 2002	14 March 2022	
Sviatoslav Aleksapolskyi	Boxing, sports tourism, chess	30 October 1989	29 August 2022	
Mykola Alekseiev	Hand-to-hand combat	3 September 1983	15 July 2014	
Volodymyr Androshchuk	Sport of athletics	10 January 2001	25 January 2023	
Stanislav Artemenko	Boxing	13 April 1997	29 July 2022	
Artem Azarov	Boxing	2 November 1995	5 March 2022	
Yevhenii Babanov	Motoball	198?	25 February 2022	
Oleksandr Babenko	Jiu-jitsu	23 June 2001	29 July 2022	
Kyrylo Bayev	Cossack martial arts, horting, judo	14 June 2001	14 January 2023	
Serhii Balanchuk	Football	31 March 1975	7 July 2022	
Yurii Balanchuk	Greco-Roman wrestling, jiu-jitsu, combat sambo	9 September 1987	?. October 2023	
Karyna Bakhur	Kickboxing	2008?	November 2025	
Hryhorii Barchyshyn	Football	3 April 1986	21 May 2023	
Mykhailo Barybin	Biathlon	197?	19 January 2023	
Maksym Benderov	Pankration	6 April 1990	15 July 2014	
Vasyl Berdychevskyi	Volleyball	1981	5 December 2022	
Serhii Berezniak	Karate	19??	10 August 2023	
Ivan Bidnyak	Sport shooting	1 October 1985	20 April 2022	
Oleksandr Bilokon	Powerlifting, strongman	22 April 1991	2 February 2024	
Taras Bilotskyi	Karate	197?	7 June 2017	
Vira Biriukova	Basketball	?.?.2005?	6 March 2022	
Yehor Birkun	Sambo	9 August 1997	10 March 2022	
Mykyta Bobrov	Rugby football	200?	28 February 2022	
Liubomyr Bodak	Weightlifting, mixed martial arts	6 October 1994	24 May 2022	
Danylo Bohuslavskyi	American football	7 April 1990	16 October 2022	
Mykhailo Boychenko	Football	11 October 1998	5 March 2022	
Oleksii Bondarenko	Mixed martial arts	22 Mai 1996	15 Januar 2026	
Yevhen Bondarenko	Bodybuilding	25 April 1985	1 May 2023	
Ihor Bondarchuk	Powerlifting	1 September 1989	22 May 2022	
Denys Boreiko	Fencing	19??	3 July 2023	
Artem Borodavka	Ultimate frisbee	198?	21 June 2022	
Oleksandr Borovskyi	Volleyball	199?	7 June 2023	
Ihor Borys	Powerlifting	4 May 1983	11 July 2014	
Viktor Borzhiievskyi	Sports tourism	198?	17 March 2023	
Igor Boyko	American football	19 June 1991	15 June 2022	
Yurii Bozhenko	Boxing	26 May 1978	?. April 2023	
Oleksandr Bronnikov	Basketball, streetball	19??	?. August 2023	
Oleksandr Brychuk	Karate, orienteering	11 May 1976	16 August 2014	
Artem Bulash	Field hockey	31 October 1988	25 October 2022	
Andrii Burchak	Archery	11 December 1987	24 December 2022	
Maksym Burdus	Kickboxing (WAKO), boxing	6 March 2000	11 June 2023	
Trokhym Bychko	Basketball, judo, sport dancing	201?	?. August 2023	
Oleh Bykhovets	Football	7 February 2001	28 April 2023	
Andriy Bykovskyi	Football	21 June 1981	?. March 2023	
Oleksiy Bykovskyi	American football	February 1995	9 January 2023	
Denys Chabanchuk	Swimming	2 September 1992	18 February 2015	
Ihor Chechynov	Hand-to-hand combat, sambo, Football	30 December 1969	28 October 2022	
Andriy Chepil	Snowboarding	6 April 1994	28 June 2023	
Liudmyla Chernetska	Bodybuilding	22 July 1993	23 April 2022	
Kostiantyn Chernikov	Artistic gymnastics	198?	May 2024	
Volodymyr Chernysh	Motorsport, karting	21 December 1981	10 September 2023	
Serhiy Chmyr	Football	23 November 1972	8 November 2023	
Nazariy Chyhin	Athletics	24 March 1995	6 October 2022	
Mykhailo Chynhar	Judo	12 February 1995	24 January 2023	
Stepan Chubenko	Football	11 November 1997	27 July 2014	
Maksym Chumak	Judo, sambo	1984	3 January 2023	
Serhiy Chupryna	Handball	17 July 1980	26 July 2023	
Ruslan Danko	Greco-Roman wrestling	5 July 1990	23 February 2024	
Vasyl Daskaliuk	Jiu-jitsu, pankration, boxing, grappling	13 January 1981	20 February 2023	
Kyrylo Demydov	Motorsport, karting	27 October 1998	6 August 2023	
Vadym Denchyk	Clay pigeon shooting, basketball	13 December 1968	??. November 2022	
Kostiantyn Deneka	Cycling	12 March 1983	31 March 2023	
Oleksandr Derevianko	Boxing, sambo, mixed martial arts	23 November 1997	3 April 2022	
Leonid Derhach	Powerlifting	24 March 1979	1 February 2017	
Ihor Diachenko	Athletics	19??	22 October 2022	
Kateryna Diachenko	Kettlebell lifting	201?	10 March 2022	
Oleksiy Diahovets	Horting, crossfit, rugby	198?	7 September 2022	
Yuriy Diatliuk	Football, mini-football	12 December 1988	3 August 2023	
Bohdan Didukh	Football	25 November 1989	13 June 2023	
Andriy Dmytriiev	Kettlebell lifting, powerlifting, tug of war, strongman	199?	?. January 2023	
Hryhoriy Dobosh	Football	29 September 1991	19 March 2022	
Viktor Domitrashchuk	Pankration	8 January 1998	8 January 2023	
Valentyn Dondikov	Sport shooting	19 October 1983	6 April 2024	
Mykhailo Donskyi	Bodybuilding, powerlifting	195?	23 January 2024	
Ihor Doroshenko	Weightlifting	15 September 1975	10 April 2023	
Vasyl Drohomyretskyi	Powerlifting	8 May 1994	22 May 2022	
Oleksiy Druzhynets	Chess	3 January 1975	2 March 2022	
Vladyslav Dzhun	Futsal	17 March 1998	17 May 2022	
Oleksiy Dzhunkivskyi	Boxing	3 August 1982	28 March 2022	
Karyna Dyachenko	Gymnastics	2011	2022	
Oleksandr Dykyi	Rowing	198?	16 April 2022	
Vadym Dudko	Rugby	18 May 1999	15 July 2023	
Serhii Dunai	Football	1 August 1971	4 June 2023	
Serhii Fedorov	Streetball, basketball 3×3, basketball	198?	11 September 2023	
Liubomyr Fedyniak	Athletics, volleyball	23 January 1976	7 March 2022	
Mykola Fetisov	Mountaineering, rock climbing, paragliding, sports tourism, Swimming, enduro racing	22 April 1994	20 May 2022	
Oleksandr Feshtryha	Kickboxing	1980	May 2022	
Dmytro Fialka	Football	21 June 1983	1 September 2022	
Dmytro Furdyk	American football	11 January 1979	17 January 2015	
Andriy Halai	Powerlifting	10 December 1993	20 July 2014	
Maksym Halinichev	Boxing	29 August 2000	10 March 2023	
Leonid Hambarov	Mountaineering	1940	25 April 2022	
Mahomed Haniiev	Pankration	3 March 1990	26 September 2023	
Yevhen Harda	Kickboxing	26 July 1992	12 April 2022	
Yaroslav Harkavko	Ice hockey	20 December 1995	?. December 2022	
Daniel Herliani	Greco-Roman wrestling	20 June 1998	3 June 2022	
Roman Havryliuk	Athletics	18 July 1982	16 May 2024	
Petro Havryliv	Football	2000	?. July 2022	
Oleksandr Herasymenko	Football	24 April 1990	5 March 2022	
Mykola Hetmanov	Rugby	1990?	5 October 2025	
Volodymyr Hiba	Motorsport, motorcycle racing	23 August 1966	13 November 2023	
Dmytro Hohol	Powerlifting, kettlebell lifting	197?	24 October 2023	
Roman Hodovanyi	Football	4 October 1990	29 November 2023	
Yevhen Holovan	Skiing	14 March 1997	26 February 2022	
Roman Holovatiuk	Kickboxing	30 September 1995	2?. August 2024	
Andriy Holovchenko	Football	15 May 1984	5 March 2022	
Oleksandr Honchar	Football	25 February 1980	16 August 2023	
Anastasiia Honcharova	Mountain bike, cyclocross	200?	28 February 2023	
Danylo Horbenko	Athletics	7 November 1999	27 January 2023	
Vladyslav Horbunov	Rugby	3 May 2000	20 June 2022	
Yuriy Horodniy	Karate-do	3 November 1979	15 May 2022	
Oleksandra Hrabovska	Bodybuilding	21 December 1995	202?	
Volodymyr Hradinovych	Floorball	5 January 1984	18 July 2023	
Oleh Hrama	Mixed martial arts (MMA)	199?	18 February 2023	
Oleksandr Hrechanyk	Kickboxing, CrossFit	10 November 1977	4 June 2023	
Vasyl Hretchyn	Football	1977?	28 April 2023	
Oleksandr Hrianyk	Sports tourism, mountaineering, Football	8 January 1994	8 May 2022	
Oleksandr Hruzin	Football	30 January 1978	9 September 2024	
Hryhorii Hryhoriev	Mountaineering, climbing, triathlon, athletics, cycling	198?	21 January 2023	
Artur Hrytsenko	Football	15 February 1979	22 April 2022	
Dmytro Hubanov	Rowing	23 February 1995	3 August 2023	
Stanislav Hulenkov	Judo	3 September 2000	20 April 2023	
Andrii Hurychev	Powerlifting	26 June 1991	5 August 2015	
Andriy Husiev	Motorsport, motorcycle racing, taekwondo, diving	24 November 1980	3 June 2023	
Serhiy Hussidi	Swimming, sport shooting, hand-to-hand combat	22 March 1981	16 May 2022	
Mykola Hutsalenko	Canoe sprint	19 December 1991	23 February 2017	
Anastasiia Ihnatenko	Sports acrobatics	27 September 1995	14 January 2023	
Anton Ihoshyn	Trampoline gymnastics	199?	23 September 2023	
Oleksandr Ilchenko	Aikido, futsal	11 September 1987	18 June 2023	
Roman Illiashenko	Free fight	8 March 1991	29 August 2014	
Pavlo Ishchenko	Strongman	?	October 2025	
Serhiy Ivanenko	Athletics	11 July 1982	10 November 2023	
Atanas Ivanov	Weightlifting	200?	7 March 2022	
Yuriy Ivanovych	Boxing	1998	October 2022	
Oleksandr Ivankov	Boxing, parachuting, diving	22 August 1986	12 September 2019	
Oleksandr Ivashchyk	Futsal, Football	1 November 1979	13 March 2022	
Viktoriia Ivashko	Judo	201?	1 June 2023	
Maksym Kagal	Kickboxing	3 July 1991	11 November 2022	
Oleksandr Kalov	Football	1987?	1 October 2022	
Serhiy Karaivan	Weightlifting, Swimming	31 August 1990	10 March 2022	
Serhiy Karnaukhov	Powerlifting	10 November 1978	27 May 2022	
Ihor Karuk	Dragon boat racing, athletics	2 June 1974	March 2022	
Viktor Katanchyk	Floorball	15 September 2003	15 March 2022	
Roman Kava	Freestyle wrestling	October 1993	17 June 2023	
Ivan Kazakov	Rowing	3 April 1975	21 March 2022	
Yuriy Kazistov	Football	19??	March 2022	
Oleksiy Khabarov	Archery	25 April 1994	2025	
Artem Khan	Boxing	6 April 2001	not earlier than 30 April 2022	
Oleksiy Khanilevych	Basketball	31 July 1998	28 February 2023	
Ivan Kharchenko	Football	199?	31 May 2024	
Yaroslav Khibovskyi	Powerlifting	29 December 1998	5 December 2022	
Bohdan Khmeliuk	Powerlifting	22 January 2001	8 July 2023	
Oleksandr Khmil	Ice hockey	6 December 1980	May 2023	
Bohdan Khodakivskyi	Athletics	1 March 2000	15 May 2023	
Oleksandr Khomenchuk	Football	25 June 1972	24 July 2022	
Ivan Khomiv	Cycling	1993?	17 November 2024	
Ihor Khramtsov	Fencing	15 January 1972	3 September 2024	
Andriy Khrapanov	Mixed martial arts, free-fight	21 September 1985	7 January 2023	
Roman Khytrych	Chess	August 1980	7 October 2023	
Yehor Kihitov	Sport shooting	200?	April 2022	
Orest Kinash	Mountaineering, climbing, sport tourism	19??	29 March 2023	
Andriy Kirichenko	Rowing	22 April 1983	15 July 2023	
Maksym Kit	Boxing	16 November 2001	25 May 2024	
Volodymyr Klenin	Boxing	3 September 1940	30 April 2022	
Oleksandr Klushyn	MMA, Cossack martial arts, jiu-jitsu	25 February 1994	2 March 2022	
Illia Kobchenko	Sumo, pankration, grappling, MMA, hand-to-hand combat	7 October 1999	8 May 2023	
Dmytro Kobenko	Weightlifting	15 July 2001	2 March 2022	
Hryhorii Kobiv	Football	9 May 1969	2 June 2023	
Mykhailo Kobyzhcha	Swimming, modern pentathlon	15 December 1985	January 2023	
Viktor Kobzystyi	Basketball	7 March 1979	29 December 2023	
Dmytro Kochetkov	Mountaineering	28 August 1979	19 April 2022	
Yevhen Kolesnichenko	Handball	3 May 1987	11 November 2022	
Serhii Kolokolov	Weightlifting	198?	17 April 2022	
Oleksandr Koloniuk	Ice hockey	24 October 2003	May 2023	
Vasyl Kolubatko	Aikido	1971?	2 June 2023	
Andriy Komarystyi	Handball	16 May 1994	14 September 2014	
Pavlo Komyshanchenko	Cycling	18 January 1974	10 February 2024	
Daniil Kondel	Judo, sambo	25 May 2001	2 April 2023	
Ivan Kononenko	Weightlifting	26 July 1983	2025	
Artur Konovka	Powerlifting	198?	14 March 2022	
Valentyn Konovodov	Weightlifting, jiu-jitsu, grappling	7 July 1997	10 June 2022	
Mykhailo Korenovskyi	Boxing	1984	14 January 2023	
Andrii Kosiak	Judo	1 January 1971	15 January 2023	
Eduard Kostrytsia	Mixed martial arts	19 July 1992	23 January 2023	
Viktor Kotelevets	Kettlebell sport	10 June 1994	6 February 2023	
Viktoriia Kotliarova	Football	January 1995	29 December 2023	
Pavlo Kotiuk	Kickboxing	12 July 1994	3 August 2022	
Andriy Kotovenko	Powerlifting	1983	2 May 2022	
Taras Koval	Archery	198?	18 March 2023	
Maksym Kovalenko	Swimming	1996	6 March 2022	
Alla Kovierienie	Dragon boat racing	3 April 1981	10 August 2023	
Volodymyr Kovtun	Football	19 September 1976	March 2022	
Bohdan Kozak	Futsal	16 March 2005	9 February 2024	
Oleksandr Kozhukh	Volleyball	199?	6 August 2022	
Mykyta Kozubenko	Diving	1994?	June 2025	
Oleh Kravets	Swimming	19??	May 2023	
Andrii Kravchenko	Orienteering	19??	May 2022	
Mykhailo Kravchenko	Kart racing	197?	4 June 2023	
Oleh Kristiev	Rugby	October 1992	20 May 2022	
Ihor Krotkikh	Paintball	10 November 1975	21 March 2022	
Roman Krukhovskyi	Greco-Roman wrestling	29 July 1980	2 August 2022	
Valentyn Krynytskyi	Boxing	13 March 1989	13 October 2022	
Ihor Krysovatyi	Powerlifting	2 February 1992	17 June 2014	
Stepan Kryvoruchenko	Wrestling, judo	18 October 1969	15 March 2015	
Oleh Kulinenko	Powerlifting	15 February 1996	22 January 2015	
Oleksandr Kulyk	Cycling	24 May 1957	1 March 2022	
Oleksii Kupyriev	Boxing	14 March 1975	8 March 2022	
Ruslan Kurdas	Football	14 February 1994	27 January 2023	
Daria Kurdel	Sport dancing	200?	9 July 2022	
Andrii Kutsenko	Cycling	28 December 1989	3 July 2024	
Kostiantyn Kuzin	Mountaineering	19??	23 June 2023	
Ihor Kuzmynskyi	Athletics	6 April 1984	20 March 2022	
Orest Kvach	Free fight	23 July 1991	27 July 2014	
Volodymyr Kyrychuk	Football	1999	December 2022	
Denys Labunskyi	Weightlifting	29 October 1993	24 November 2022	
Volodymyr Lavreniuk	Nordic ski tourism	1998?	February 2022	
Taras Lavriv	Athletics	6 June 1989	10 April 2022	
Mariia Lebid	Sport dancing	2007?	14 January 2023	
Oleh Leniuk	Orienteering	6 April 1999	15 May 2022	
Bohdan Liahov	Athletics	11 February 2003	25 December 2022	
Vitalii Lisun	Water polo	—	16 July 2022	
Vladyslav Liutov	Mixed martial arts (MMA), karate, wushu	23 February 1976	29 March 2022	
Oleksandr Lizin	Powerlifting	19??	April 2023	
Oleksii Lohinov	Ice hockey	25 November 1999	8 November 2023	
Yuriy Luchenko	Powerlifting	19 May 1999	9 April 2022	
Ruslan Luzhevskyi	Sport shooting, hand-to-hand combat, parachuting	31 August 1975	5 May 2014	
Vitalii Lychmanenko	Greco-Roman wrestling	1977	16 January 2023	
Andriy Lyfar	Tumbling	19??	16 May 2024	
Vladyslav Lykhoshva	Ice hockey	31 March 2002	15 July 2023	
Serhiy Lysiuk	Kickboxing	1985	22 November 2023	
Stanislav Makaida	Volleyball	28 June 1999	24 February 2023	
Nazar Makarenko	Kickboxing	199?	May 2022	
Andrii Mazanovych	Powerlifting	1987	July 2024	
Bohdan Mazur	Sport shooting	21 February 1994	2 December 2023	
Oleh Mazur	Football	13 May 1996	19 May 2022	
Dmytro Maksymov	Judo	17 November 1994	19 February 2014	
Oleksandr Malanchuk	Football	1998?	1 April 2020	
Bohdan Maliuk	Jiu-jitsu, combat sambo, MMA	31 May 2001	20 March 2022	
Maksym Malkov	Sea all-around, rowing	200?	May 2022	
Oleksandr Malofieiev	Kyokushin Karate	17 October 1975	26 June 2022	
Eleonora Maltseva (Didkovska)	Futsal, mini-football, Football	2 April 1989	31 July 2023	
Yevhen Malyshev	Biathlon	10 March 2002	1 March 2022	
Oleksii Mamchiy	Field hockey	27 June 1980	13 April 2021	
Stanislav Mamchiy	Field hockey	13 September 1983	18 July 2016	
Vitalii Mandryk	Kickboxing, hand-to-hand combat	12 April 1987	23 February 2015	
Viktor Mandzyk	Boxing, kickboxing	7 December 1986	21 March 2014	
Dmytro Markhovskyi	Basketball	1993	January 2024	
Dmytro Martynenko	Football	22 February 1997	27 February 2022	
Vadym Marynych	Powerlifting	?	2025	
Vitalii Maslo	Handball	1974?	13 January 2026	
Andrii Maslov	Football	21 May 1987	21 May 2018	
Viktor Melnychenko	Boxing	25 March 1989	13 February 2023	
Serhii Melnychenko	Athletics, Football	9 November 1992	8 May 2022	
Oleh Melnychuk	Athletics	1994	15 May 2024	
Stanislav Meniuk	Arm wrestling	9 February 1991	27 July 2014	
Vitaly Merinov	Kickboxing, boxing, universal fight	31 December 1990	31 March 2023	
Romana Miasoiedova	Volleyball	30 July 2004	16 March 2022	
Roman Minakov	Rowing	19??	November 2022	
Meruzh (Mykola) Miroshnychenko	Pankration	17 November 1984	12 August 2014	
Yaroslav Mokhonko	American football	199?	26 June 2022	
Kyrylo Molokov	Mini-football, Football	2001	5 June 2023	
Bohdan Monakh	Sambo	2002	2 March 2022	
Oleksandr Moriev	Rugby	19??	March 2023	
Maksym Moroz	Athletics	7 January 1999	15 December 2024	
Vitalii Morozov	Kettlebell sport	1989	7 March 2022	
Volodymyr Moseichuk	Football	1995?	23 June 2025	
Artem Mosha	Boxing	?	8 May 2022	
Volodymyr Motelchuk	Indoor rowing, sitting volleyball	198?	29 March 2022	
Mykhailo Movchan	Sports tourism, mountaineering	1987	20 June 2023	
Volodymyr Mykolaienko	American football	23 September 1989	13 February 2023	
Kostiantyn Muzychenko	Football	18 February 1993	16 February 2023	
Dmytro Muzyrov	Canoe and kayak rowing, dragon boat racing	5 September 1995	28 February 2022	
Oleksii Naida	Boxing, free fight	2001	19 July 2023	
Andriy Nakonechnyi	Athletics, trainer, director of the Radekhiv Youth Sports School	23 September 1976	30 May 2022	
Dmytro Neimat	Sport shooting	26 October 1992	19 April 2022	
Yurii Nemchenko	Basketball	19??	31 March 2022	
Volodymyr Neroda	Archery	199?	13 October 2022	
Serhii Neustroiev	Chess	199?	12 June 2022	
Serhii Nikolaienko	Football	24 August 1967	28 October 2023	
Yevhen Obedynskyi	Water polo	12 October 1983	17 March 2022	
Andrii Ohorodnyk	Boxing	199?	16 September 2023	
Oleksandr Odintsov	Pankration	25 March 1998	12 February 2022	
Dmytro Odynets	Swimming, athletics	4 March 2000	16 October 2023	
Dmytro Oliinyk	Indoor rowing	198?	29 March 2022	
Yurii Oliinyk	Mountaineering, sports tourism	198?	23 March 2022	
Ihor Olkhovych	Freestyle wrestling, boxing	1973	23 July 2023	
Oleksandr Onishchuk	Archery	19??	May 2022	
Oleksandr Onoshko	Cycling	23 June 1981	16 March 2022	
Oleksandr Onyshchenko	Boxing	199?	8 May 2023	
Mykhailo Oprysk	Table tennis	1988	24 March 2023	
Yurii Osadchuk	Jiu-jitsu, Muay Thai, Swimming, athletics	30 May 1989	15 October 2022	
Artem Osin	Greco-Roman wrestling, freestyle wrestling, judo, sambo	19??	12 January 2023	
Ihor Osmak	Athletics	30 November 1965	14 May 2023	
Oleksandr Palhuiev	Pankration, bodybuilding	18 September 1992	12 August 2014	
Vitalii Parashchuk	Judo	?	22 April 2023	
Oleksandr Parvadov	Mountain biking, BMX	1991	20 February 2024	
Yuriy Paskhalin	Weightlifting	18 January 1984	19 February 2014	
Ihor Pastukh	Greco-Roman wrestling	?	July 2022	
Denys Pashynskyi	Ice hockey	28 April 1978	27 January 2023	
Vasyl Paveliev	Strongman	24 November 1994	20 July 2022	
Andrii Pedora	Volleyball, beach volleyball	22 September 1989	4 June 2024	
Alina Perehudova	Weightlifting	200?	25 February 2022	
Yevhen Perepelytsia	Automobile drifting	199?	17 May 2022	
Andrii Petrenko	Futsal	198?	April 2023	
Eduard Petryk	Futsal	9 June 1988	10 January 2026	
Oleksandr Pielieshenko	Weightlifting	7 January 1994	5 May 2024	
Dmytro Pidopryhora	Bodybuilding	1986	19 January 2023	
Eduard Pinchuk	Ski	5 July 1981	22 January 2023	
Ruslan Piskovyi	Kickboxing (WAKO), wushu	23 November 2001	18 April 2023	
Viktor Pitsul	Powerlifting	22 June 1990	17 June 2014	
Dmytro Piven	Football	199?	August 2022	
Serhii Podolian	Kickboxing	5 December 1981	31 August 2022	
Oleksandr Polishchuk	Mountaineering	6 January 1977	23 December 2022	
Roman Polishchuk	Athletics	20 April 1993	10 March 2023	
Serhii Polishchuk	Mountaineering, rock climbing, snowboarding, sports tourism	June 1987	11 June 2022	
Mykola Poliuliak	Snowboarding	198?	May 2022	
Taras Pona	Mountaineering, rock climbing, sports tourism	197?	21 October 2022	
Mykhailo Popov	Greco-Roman wrestling	15 May 1998	15 May 2022	
Oleksandr Popovchenko	Football	3 January 1978	16 May 2022	
Halyna Popovska	Sport shooting	1964	8 September 2022	
Oleh Popovychuk	Horting	6 October 1981	6 May 2023	
Viktor Poniatenko	Boxing	?	15 May 2022	
Anatolii Potaichuk	Football	20 June 1982	27 June 2022	
Oleksandr Pradun	Mixed martial arts (MMA), Football	18 January 1994	25 November 2022	
Artem Pryimenko	Sambo	31 May 2006	8 March 2022	
Artem Prysiazhniuk	Hand-to-hand combat, boxing, combat sambo	?	December 2022	
Ihor Prysiazhniuk	Canoeing, kayak rowing	11 January 1977	7 August 2014	
Serhiy Pronevych	Athletics	5 June 1991	12 March 2022	
Roman Proniuk	Handball	28 February 1975	February 2023	
Oleh Prudkyi	Boxing	11 September 1991	22 May 2022	
Dmytro Pyasetskyi	Mixed martial arts (MMA), Kyokushin karate, karate, kickboxing, boxing	1990?	29 August 2022	
Oleksandr Pytel	Greco-Roman wrestling	28 March 1996	11 March 2022	
Oleksandr Pyvovarov	Kickboxing	8 September 1988	28 September 2014	
Yehor Riabenko	Kickboxing, Muay Thai, boxing	17 December 1996	16 September 2023	
Valerii Rodionov	Boxing, basketball	19 December 1988	15 March 2024	
Yevhen Rolduhin	Jiu-jitsu	199?	September 2022	
Andrii Romanov	Volleyball, beach volleyball	1991	February 2025	
Illia Romanovskyi	Kyokushin karate	24 May 2004	26 March 2023	
Serhii Romanchuk	Football	24 September 1994	1 June 2022	
Serhii Rozhok	Football	25 April 1985	23 January 2024	
Anatolii Rozvadovskyi	Jiu-jitsu	199?	September 2022	
Yana Rykhlitska	Judo, sambo, equestrian sport	2 April 1993	3 March 2023	
Oleh Rysak	Kickboxing	24 October 1997	24 October 2022	
Valeriy Rysinskyi	Football	8 January 1977	14 March 2022	
Oleksii Rubtsov	Athletics	198?	18 September 2022	
Tymofii Rudiak	Pankration	15 September 1978	2 March 2022	
Volodymyr Rudiuk	Karate, aikido, airsoft	28 October 1987	7 November 2022	
Yaroslav Rudych	Boxing	199?	3 June 2022	
Artem Sachuk	Chess	27 November 1984	26 November 2023	
Mykhailo Safronov	Chess, athletics, cycling	21 November 1995	23 January 2023	
Yurii Samaniuk	Free fight, hand-to-hand combat, combat hopak, sports tourism	19??	25 June 2023	
Oleh Sapalenko	Sambo	23 September 1993	24 June 2022	
Vitalii Sapylo	Football	3 September 2000	25 February 2022	
Ruslan Sapozhnik	American football	19??	16 October 2022	
Oleksandr Savostov	Canoe and kayak rowing	10 February 1998	17 September 2022	
Viacheslav Savytskyi	Football	10 February 1998	21 June 2023	
Bohdan Semenchuk	Football	12 June 1993	13 March 2022	
Anatolii Semeniuk	Martial arts	1995?	19 October 2022	
Oleksandr Semeniuk	Karate	19??	28 December 2024	
Maksym Semenov	Cycling, mountaineering, parachuting, skateboarding, water skiing, slacklining, highlining	197?	7 May 2022	
Dmytro Serbin	American football	7 May 1973	25 October 2022	
Oleksandr Serbinov	Athletics	28 May 1977	29 April 2022	
Oleksandr Serhiienko	Rowing	25 December 1991	9 September 2022	
Ihor Severenchuk	Football	17 December 1993	13 August 2024	
Viacheslav Shakhov	Volleyball	2 March 1979	30 January 2023	
Vitalii Shapoval	Horting	7 October 2000	11 May 2023	
Vladyslav Shapovalov	Kettlebell lifting	200?	20 July 2022	
Dmytro Sharpar	Figure skating	21 December 1997	31 March 2022	
Andrii Shcherbanivskyi	Athletics, triathlon	15 January 1979	22 March 2023	
Oleksandr Shchetinin	Football	6 April 1994	11 March 2023	
Serhiy Shestak	Football	22 June 1988	18 March 2022	
Vasyl Shevchuk	Athletics, strongman, weightlifting, Swimming	29 January 1964	12 March 2022	
Vladyslav Shein	Judo	200?	November 2022	
Oleksandr Sheremet	Orienteering	8 November 1983	31 March 2022	
Ivan Shchokin	Rowing	1997	13 March 2022	
Arina Shnabska	Kyokushin karate, taekwondo	20??	14 September 2022	
Andriy Shostak	Football	13 January 1976	March 2022	
Dmytro Shpak	Greco-Roman wrestling, grappling, jiu-jitsu, kettlebell lifting, pankration	18 April 1984	4 November 2022	
Volodymyr Shpetnyi	Orienteering, rogaining	6 April 1999	22 March 2023	
Taras Shpuk	Invictus Games	1991?	September 2025	
Oleksiy Shubin	Football	5 April 1975	18 November 2024	
Viktor Shvets	Rowing	8 October 1955	19 February 2014	
Maksym Shvets	Rugby league (13s)	199?	14 July 2022	
Serhii Shvydkyi	Basketball	199?	26 January 2023	
Oleksandr Shyshkov	Beach soccer	19 May 1980	1 July 2022	
Olha Simonova	Contact karate, jiu-jitsu, hand-to-hand combat, mountaineering, sports tourism, rock climbing, snowboarding, athletics, basketball	12 July 1988	13 September 2022	
Andrii Sirobaba	Judo	2002?	29 October 2025	
Oleh Siryi	Canoe slalom, skiing	19 July 1989	11 May 2023	
Artem Skliarov	Artistic gymnastics	28 March 1994	15 October 2023	
Valeriy Skorentsov	Horting, pankration, military sports all-around	14 July 1987	8 November 2022	
Viktor Skorodenko	Athletics, Football	12 October 1968	21 January 2023	
Oksana Skrypan	Rowing	28 January 1977	25 May 2024	
Roman Skrypniuk	Football	8 October 1992	March 2023	
Roman Skulchuk	Chess	199?	July 2023	
Andrii Sliusar	Table tennis	4 February 1994	July 2022	
Yevhen Sliusarenko	Pankration, grappling	25 December 2001	22 April 2022	
Oleksii Sliushchenko	Powerlifting, bodybuilding	22 June 1984	5 June 2023	
Andrii Slupskyi	Canoe and kayak rowing	196?	16 July 2023	
Serhii Smilin	Invictus Games	1 June 1992	18 March 2022	
Nazar Sokolovskyi	Football	27 April 1989	1 March 2024	
Vadym Solodkyi	Football	5 August 1970	2022	
Ivan Soltysyk	Mixed martial arts, boxing	15 November 1997	7 November 2023	
Roman Soroka	Football	16 October 1977	27 May 2024	
Denys Sosnenko	Muay Thai	2001	24 January 2023	
Vadym Sotnykov	Hand-to-hand combat	20 November 1980	29 May 2022	
Yevgen Sotnikov	Judo	20 November 1980	6 August 2021	
Serhii Sova	Boxing	10 November 1978	27 May 2022	
Ihor Stakhiv	Football	1 September 1968	26 May 2024	
Taras Stakhiv	Karate-do	18 January 2004	15 January 2023	
Viktor Stasiuk	Kudo, kickboxing, karate, weightlifting	21 March 1975	7 March 2022	
Vitalii Stavskyi	Greco-Roman wrestling	3 September 1991	31 August 2014	
Volodymyr Stelmakh	Rugby	4 March 1995	11 March 2022	
Roman Stetsiuk	Football	6 February 1998	2 March 2022	
Serhii Stolbtsov	Powerlifting	198?	28 September 2022	
Yaroslav Strilets	Pankration, MMA	23 May 2003	10 September 2024	
Vitalii Styba	Kickboxing (WAKO)	22 June 1999	23 August 2022	
Ihor Sukhenko	Football	8 February 1966	24 March 2022	
Oleksandr Sukhenko	Football	25 September 1996	24 March 2022	
Ihor Sukhykh	Military sports all-around, hand-to-hand combat, sambo, Football	5 July 1990	26 March 2023	
Oleksandr Suprunov	Kickboxing (WTKA)	19??	March 2022	
Viktor Sushkov	CrossFit, functional fitness	15 August 1991	20 March 2022	
Yevhen Svitlychnyi	Free fight	7 September 1993	19 July 2023	
Oleksii Sych	Swimming	19??	24 December 2022	
Dmytro Sydoruk	Archery	2 February 1983	5 April 2022	
Maksym Symaniuk	Karate	2013	8 July 2024	
Kostiantyn Syniakevych	Mountaineering, rock climbing	1970	27 December 2022	
Vsevolod Tankov	Water polo	24 February 2004	4 July 2023	
Illia Tarasiuk	Hang gliding	?	January 2024	
Fedir Temir	CrossFit, athletics, military functional fitness	6 October 1994	7 March 2022	
Oleksandr Tepenchak	Orienteering	25 August 1977	20 March 2022	
Andriy Tereshchenko	Greco-Roman wrestling	23 June 1991	2 December 2014	
Valeriy Tiasko	Volleyball, beach volleyball	16 December 1983	25 June 2022	
Kyrylo Tileiev	Judo	18 September 1992	October 2022	
Artem Tipenko	Kettlebell lifting	18 December 1988	19 October 2022	
Serhiy Tkachenko	Judo	19??	14 March 2023	
Viktor Tkachuk	Football	6 January 1969	9 April 2022	
Oleksandr Tlatov	Handball, rugby	14 August 1988	26 January 2026	
Artem Tolochko	Rugby union	1 July 1986	17 September 2022	
Mykola Toniievych	Parachuting	2 December 1988	22 August 2023	
Volodymyr Torohoi	Boxing	July 1994	August 2022	
Yevhen Trofymov	Muay Thai	12 March 1993	28 July 2014	
Kateryna Troyan	Sport of athletics	1993?	5 June 2025	
Mykhailo Tsap	Handball	28 May 1980	24 February 2024	
Yurii Tsaryk	Football	199?	8 August 2022	
Oleksiy Tsybko	Rugby union	19 March 1967	31 March 2022	
Mykola Tymoshenko	Mountaineering, rock climbing	2000	9 September 2022	
Oleksandr Tykhonets	Futsal, Football	10 April 2002	19 June 2023	
Ihor Tyshchenko	Military sports, hand-to-hand combat	199?	2 June 2022	
Viktor Udalov	Football	26 September 1942	12 May 2022	
Serhii Udovkin	Tennis	1982	25 September 2023	
Volodymyr Ulianytskyi	Swimming	199?	17 July 2022	
Vladyslav Vakulenko	Muay Thai	28 February 2001	30 December 2022	
Kyrylo Vasylchishyn	Tennis	19??	27 June 2022	
Valeriy Vasin	Kyokushin karate	1975	12 October 2022	
Dmytro Voitiuk	Horting, boxing	3 January 1993	?. June 2023	
Volodymyr Voloshchuk	Powerlifting	20 August 1981	11 April 2022	
Oleksandr Vorobiov	Boxing	2 March 1967	29 January 2023	
Andriy Vorobkalo	Taekwondo	199?	2 April 2023	
Oleh Voitovych	Kickboxing, taekwondo	19??	?. June 2023	
Yuriy Vorona	Boxing	1996	8 March 2022	
Oleh Vovk	Boxing	27 July 2005	12 March 2022	
Valentyn Vozniuk	Athletics	23 October 1947	14 January 2023	
Temur Yuldashev	Powerlifting	11 March 1969	24 August 2014	
Viktor Yurchenko	Football	10 October 1963	24 March 2022	
Andrii Yurkevych	Free-fight	18 April 1982	5 September 2014	
Maksym Yalovtsov	Jiu-jitsu, pankration, free-fight, sambo, grappling, rugby	5 August 1990	21 September 2022	
Oleksii Yanin	Kickboxing, Muay Thai, boxing	5 October 1983	7 April 2022	
Mykola Yaremchuk	Karate	19 May 2000	12 February 2023	
Andriy Yaremenko	Wrestling	1999	4 December 2025	
Viktor Yarmolenko	Kyokushinkai karate	2 January 1976	10 May 2022	
Denys Yashchuk	Boxing	19??	August 2024	
Yurij Yehorov	Boxing	2004	11 July 2025	
Daniel Yegorov	Rowing	2000?	28 October 2024	
Fedir Yepifanov	Fencing	31 January 2004	11 December 2023	
Makar Yerofieiev	Ice hockey	13 October 1999	11 November 2023	
Dmytro Yevdochenko	Football	200?	11 March 2022	
Vadym Yezhov	Athletics	2 August 1938	25 March 2022	
Volodymyr Yezhov	Esports	1 August 1984	22 December 2022	
Mykola Zabavchuk	Kickboxing, powerlifting, aikido, boxing	25 October 1996	21 July 2022	
Yuriy Zahynaiko	Football	24 September 1986	19 July 2022	
Roman Zaiets	Handball	2 September 1995	27 September 2024	
Roman Zakharov	Boxing	197?	2022	
Ivan Zakharuk	Pankration	20 September 1991	17 February 2024	
Dmytro Zakharchuk	Finswimming, boxing, sport shooting	19??	5 October 2023	
Oleksandr Zakolodny	Mountaineering	8 April 1987	21 January 2023	
Vitaliy Zalizniak	Football	16 February 1973	3 December 2023	
Nikita Zasiadko	Swimming, freestyle wrestling	25 June 2005	30 November 2023	
Vasyl Zavadetskyi	Football, fishing	1971?	16 November 2022	
Ivan Zavolskyi	Weightlifting	13 June 1980	25 June 2023	
Ivan Zavolskyi	Mountaineering, sport tourism	199?	25 June 2022	
Denys Zdorovets	Rugby	25 September 1994	3 November 2022	
Vadym Zeleniuk	Judo, sambo, hand-to-hand combat, universal combat	10 June 1988	22 August 2022	
Anatolii Zeruk	Athletics	21 November 1967	19 March 2022	
Serhii Zhelezniak	Mountaineering, sport dancing	197?	1?. March 2023	
Oleksandr Zhmurko	Football	11 January 1994	20 August 2023	
Mykola Zhydkov	Football	2001	21 September 2023	
Danylo Zolotukhin	Taekwondo, parachuting	18 July 1998	27 March 2022	
Vasyl Zubrytskyi	Ski touring	25 December 1995	12 March 2023	
Nazar Zui	Boxing, Football	200?	11 March 2023	
Dan Zvonyk	Kyokushin karate	14 June 1996	April 2022	
Yevheniy Zvonok	Kickboxing	3 October 1999	3 March 2022	
