= Porcelain Museum =

Porcelain Museum may refer to:

- Museo delle Porcellane, Florence, Italy
- Riga Porcelain Museum, Riga, Latvia
- Worcester Porcelain Museum, Worcester, England
