= Volodymyr Dovgy =

Ukrainian serial killer and cannibal

- Born: Volodymyr Anatolyovich Dovgy; 1963; Nova Kakhovka, Kherson Oblast, UkSSR
- Died: 11 October 2004 (aged 40–41); Nova Kakhovka, Kherson Oblast, Ukraine
- Other names: "The Nova Kakhovka Cannibal" "The Carcass Man"
- Conviction: N/A (died before trial)

Details
- Victims: 10+
- Span of crimes: 1999–2004
- Country: Ukraine
- State: Kherson
- Date apprehended: 13 January 2004

Volodymyr Anatolyovich Dovgy (Russian: Владимир Анатольевич Довгий; 1963 – 11 October 2004), known as The Nova Kakhovka Cannibal (Russian: Людоед из Новой Каховки), was a Ukrainian serial killer and cannibal who killed at least nine women and one male acquaintance in his hometown of Nova Kakhovka between 1999 and 2004. Most of his victims were prostitutes – some were killed with the aid of his accomplice Olga Melnyk (Russian: Ольга Мельник; died 2004) – whose body parts he supposedly consumed as meat.

Following his arrest and confessions, both Dovgy and Melnyk were charged with the murders, but the pair died before their trial could begin.

== Early life ==
Volodymyr Dovgy was born in Nova Kakhovka in 1963 (other sources claim in 1961), where he grew up in a stable household. Due to his father's profession as a surgeon and his mother's as a therapist at a local hospital, the young boy became interested in medicine from an early age and began studying human anatomy. During his school years, Dovgy practised kettlebell lifting, but was unpopular with his peers and a poor student, due to which he was unable to enroll into a medical university.

In 1981, he was drafted into the Soviet Army, and after demobilization, he made another attempted to get into university, which proved unsuccessful. Dovgy then enrolled into a technical school, which he graduated in the mid-1980s and then found a job as a low-skilled laborer at a factory.

In 1986, Dovgy – who up until then had never dated – started dating a woman, and after only two months, the pair married. They had a son together, but the marriage fell through and the couple divorced two years later, with Dovgy opting to not take part in raising his son. Despite his failed marriage, he was well-regarded by friends and acquaintances alike for being very close with his parents, with whom he lived on 15 Pionerskaya Street. In his free time, Dovgy was fond of reading books and cooking, particularly canning any products he came across.

=== Downward spiral ===
Following the collapse of the USSR, Dovgy lost his job and for several years had to live off of his parents, with him only occasionally earning money from casual labor. In 1999, his mother died and his father unexpectedly remarried, moving out of the apartment and leaving Dovgy to live by himself. Dovgy would later claim that these two events severely damaged his mental state.

Sometime after this, he came across a woman named Olga Melnyk. In stark contrast to Dovgy's upbringing, she came from a poor family, was barely educated, unsociable and suffering from tuberculosis. Showing sympathy to his new companion, Dovgy offered Melnyk to live with him, after which he began to treat her and take care of her needs as much as he could. The pair became romantically involved at first, but due to Melnyk's illness, they mutually agreed to remain friends.

After failing to cure Melnyk's tuberculosis, Dovgy decided to make homemade drugs from the fatty tissues of stray dogs, which he caught off the street of Nova Kakhovka and killed. Not long after, his father noticed that his son developed several concerning habits, such as binge-drinking alcohol and visiting prostitutes, but claimed to have never seen him do any crimes or act aggressively towards others.

== Exposure ==
=== Murder of Andriy Rebenkov ===
In 2003, Dovgy got a job as a watchman at a cemetery in Nova Kakhovka. At his new workplace, he was well-liked and soon became close with one of the foremen, 24-year-old Andriy Rebenkov. In early January 2004, he invited Rebenkov over for dinner, with the man bringing over his classmate, Irina Erokhina. During dinner, an argument occurred between Rebenkov and Dovgy, but the exact circumstances as to how it came up are unclear, as two different versions were given.

In the first version, the reason for the argument was Dovgy's sexual harassment of Erokhina, which caused Rebenkov to stand up and defend over, only to be stabbed with a knife. In another version, Dovgy was supposedly resentful against the pair and spontaneously told them that he was a serial killer and that the meat was from one of his victims. Erokhina claimed that both she and Rebenkov dismissed this as a silly joke and told their drunken host that, due to him being overweight and unkempt, he did not look like one. Dovgy then left them for some time, before suddenly reemerging with a knife and attacking Rebenkov from behind, stabbing him six times in the back and ten times in the chest, killing him on the spot.

Dovgy then proceeded to dismember the body, keeping Rebenkov's soft tissues, which he later boiled and made into canned food, while the bones and other remains were buried in shallow graves near the garages in his yard. Throughout this entire process, which lasted two days, he forced the terrified Erokhina to be an unwilling participant. At some point, she managed to escape, but yet again, two different explanations were given as to how – in the first version, as the ground was frozen and hard to dig up, Dovgy dropped his guard and went to get another shovel, giving time for Erokhina to run away. In the alternate version, she managed to flee out of the apartment while Dovgy was disposing of the remains.

Later on, Dovgy claimed that ultimately decided not to eat Rebenkov's remains, as he found them too tough and unpalatable, but decided to keep his brain and cook it.

=== Arrest and confessions ===
Following her escape, Erokhina suffered a complete breakdown and hid in a shed near a friend's house, where she was discovered on the next day. The friend contacted the police, who in turn drove her to a nearby hospital to get psychological treatment. Once she calmed down, Erokhina told them about what had happened at the Dovgy household, leading to his arrest on 13 January 2004.

Once detained, Dovgy readily confessed to killing Rebenkov, and together with Erokhina, he pointed out the burial site of the remains as well as a certain spot in the Dnieper River, where he had thrown in the man's skull. Subsequently, both the remains and skull were recovered, with investigators deciding to conduct additional searches of the apartment. During this, they found more than 120 three-liter cans of home-cooked stew and broth. When asked about the source of the food, Dovgy made a shocking revelation that it was the soft tissues of prostitutes he had killed between 1999 and 2003.

Soon afterwards, circumstantial evidence was located that supported these claims. While searching the apartment, investigators found women's underwear and other personal items including shoes, the sizes of which indicated that they belonged to different women. This was further backed up by the discovery of dried bloodstains on the bathroom walls, which were later identified as belonging to at least two different women.

== Murders ==
=== Modus operandi ===
During the follow-up interrogations, Dovgy claimed that the initiator of his "dates" with prostitutes was Olga Melnyk as, according to his own claims, he had trouble communicating with women due to his inferiority complex. Also, he claimed to develop fevers and other defensive reactions when attempting to talk to women he did not know. Dovgy said that while he was able to remain friends with Melnyk, most of the time it was her, not him, who initiated conversations.

While committing the murders, Dovgy demonstrated a certain modus operandi. Once Melnyk lured a potential victim to their apartment, the trio would have dinner and drink alcohol together, after which Dovgy had sex with the victim before killing her. He himself claimed that he was afraid of looking the women in the eyes, due to which he attacked them from behind with a knife and attempted to stab them in the vital organs. He would then dismember the corpses and preserve the fatty tissues in jars to make broth or borscht from them, while the remaining body parts were disposed of around town or thrown into the Dnieper. He was able to recall each victim's appearance from memory and even gave the officers names. The investigators later confirmed some of the victims' identities as prostitutes who lived destitute lives and had recently gone missing.

Dovgy claimed that in parallel with killing people, he continued to kill and preserve the meat of stray dogs. At some point, he made so much stew from the canned meat that he started selling some of it on the local market, and even giving it to neighbors and friends.

=== Known victims ===
Dovgy's first known murder occurred in late 1999, which he claimed was by pure accident. He claimed that due to his failure to treat Melnyk's condition, she was often mocked by children and teenagers – at one point, he jokingly offered to kill the people mocking her. Supposedly, Melnyk took his joke literally, and not long after, she brought in a young woman who agreed to have dinner with them. During the event, the victim was alleged to make fun of Melnyk, leading to an angered Dovgy to stab her to death. He then dismembered the corpse and decided to try out human flesh, as he claimed that he had wanted to try out since 1998, when his mother was still alive.

On 27 March 2000, Dovgy came across a prostitute named Olena at a road near Nova Kakhovka. He invited her to his apartment and paid her 50 hryvnias to have sex with him. He said that after having dinner and sex, Melnyk complained to him that Olena had stolen money from her. The pair then attacked her, with Melnyk hitting Olena on the head with a hammer, but the victim managed to escape her grasp and flee towards the front door. However, Dovgy caught up to her, stabbed her and dragged her to the kitchen – Olena regained consciousness, fought back and again bolted towards the front door, only to find it locked. While she was trying to open the door, Dovgy stabbed her several more times and then dragged her further into the apartment, where Olena attempted to escape one final time. Dovgy then stabbed her several more times, causing her to fall unconscious and bleed to death.

On 30 November 2002, Dovgy and Melnyk were vacationing in the countryside with a female friend named Lyubov. At some point, the drunken woman had an argument with Melnyk that led to the pair exchanging insults at each other. Due to this, Dovgy and Melnyk invited her to the apartment, where they stabbed her to death after having dinner together.

By the time he killed Rebenkov, Dovgy claimed that he had developed a pathological urge to kill, but decided not to kill Erokhina because he liked her and had convinced himself that she would not go to the police. He even insisted on convincing her to help him commit further murders, a claim that was later corroborated by Erokhina herself.

==== Surviving victim and witness testimony ====
During the course of the investigation, officers found a woman who claimed to have escaped from the apartment. She claimed that she went down one floor and knocked on one of the neighbors' doors, and after seeing her all frightened and bloodied up, they agreed to shelter her. Dovgy supposedly came looking her and demanded that the neighbors give her up, but when they refused to do so, he simply left. The investigators doubted her claims, as she could not give a proper explanation as to why she or the neighbors never informed the authorities about the incident.

Another witness, an acquaintance of Dovgy's named Grishchenko, claimed that after the latter's arrest that the pair offered to have dinner and drink vodka together at their apartment sometime in February 2003. While there, Dovgy made the unusual request of not going to the bathroom, as it was supposedly a mess. At some point, Grishchenko allegedly looked into a pot that was on the stove and saw human feet, whereupon he became frightened and left the apartment on the pretext of buying more vodka. He claimed that he ran straight towards his home and told his wife about what he had seen, but when they called the police and gave Dovgy's address, they dismissed their claims for being unrealistic.

In the end, investigators calculated that approximately 240 women had visited the apartment between 1993 and 2003.

== Investigation and detainment ==
In the spring of 2004, approximately three liters worth of canned broth was seized from Dovgy's apartment and sent for analysis at a lab in Kherson. The results ultimately came out to be inconclusive, as analyst Dr. Yevgeniy Lysenko claimed that the prolonged years of storage and the heat had destroyed any traces of DNA. In addition, as there were no bones found in the jars due to Dovgy carefully disposing of them, they were unable to conclusively determine if the meat was from animals or humans.

Nevertheless, evidence was discovered that indicated that there was indeed human meat in at least some of the canned food. While conducting the exams, the analysts found a piece of skin with what appeared to be a tattoo on it. Upon further inspection, they noticed that some of the pieces of skin had a slightly different consistency and color than the rest, leading them to conclude that at least 23 jars likely contained human meat. Dovgy himself confirmed that theory, stating that the jars containing the human meat had always looked different from the one containing dog meat, as he intentionally placed them in specific jars alongside some broth and meat.

In September 2004, the investigation concluded and Dovgy was charged with ten murders. The criminal case had 7 volumes, with the indictment amounting to 50 pages worth of text.

== Death ==
During the investigation, Dovgy's mental state rapidly deteriorated due to several factors. Chief among them was the death of Olga Melnyk, whose condition worsened due to stress and eventually led to her death from it. Upon learning of this, Dovgy attempted suicide by attempting to slash his carotid artery with a sharpened piece of a plastic bottle, but he survived. In the months that followed, he became depressed but refused to recant his testimony, fully admitting guilt for the ten murders and requesting that he be executed, as he preferred that to spending the rest of his life in prison.

Once the investigation was completed, the case was sent over to the Kherson Regional Court, with the trial scheduled to begin in early 2005. However, this would never take place, as Dovgy died from a heart attack at the SIZO-1 on 11 October 2004.

=== Involvement of Dovgy's father ===
Throughout the investigation, officers suspected that Dovgy's father, Anatoliy, might have been aware of his son's crimes and was an active participant. This came from the realization that Anatoliy had sold some of the canned food on the market as "badger meat" and allegations that he had destroyed potential evidence.

The latter accusation comes from the fact that despite being prohibited from entering the apartment, Anatoliy went inside and took about 40 cans of meat and the women's clothing. He then destroyed the cans, but never disclosed what happened to the clothes. Anatoliy himself never gave a rational explanation about why he went to the apartment, only claiming that he wanted to do some cleaning up, but never explained why he took the cans supposedly containing human meat.

Investigators were never able to properly determine the extent of Anatoliy Dovgy's knowledge about the crimes, if any, as he died in early 2005.

== See also ==
- List of serial killers by country
- List of incidents of cannibalism
