= Valery Fedorenko =

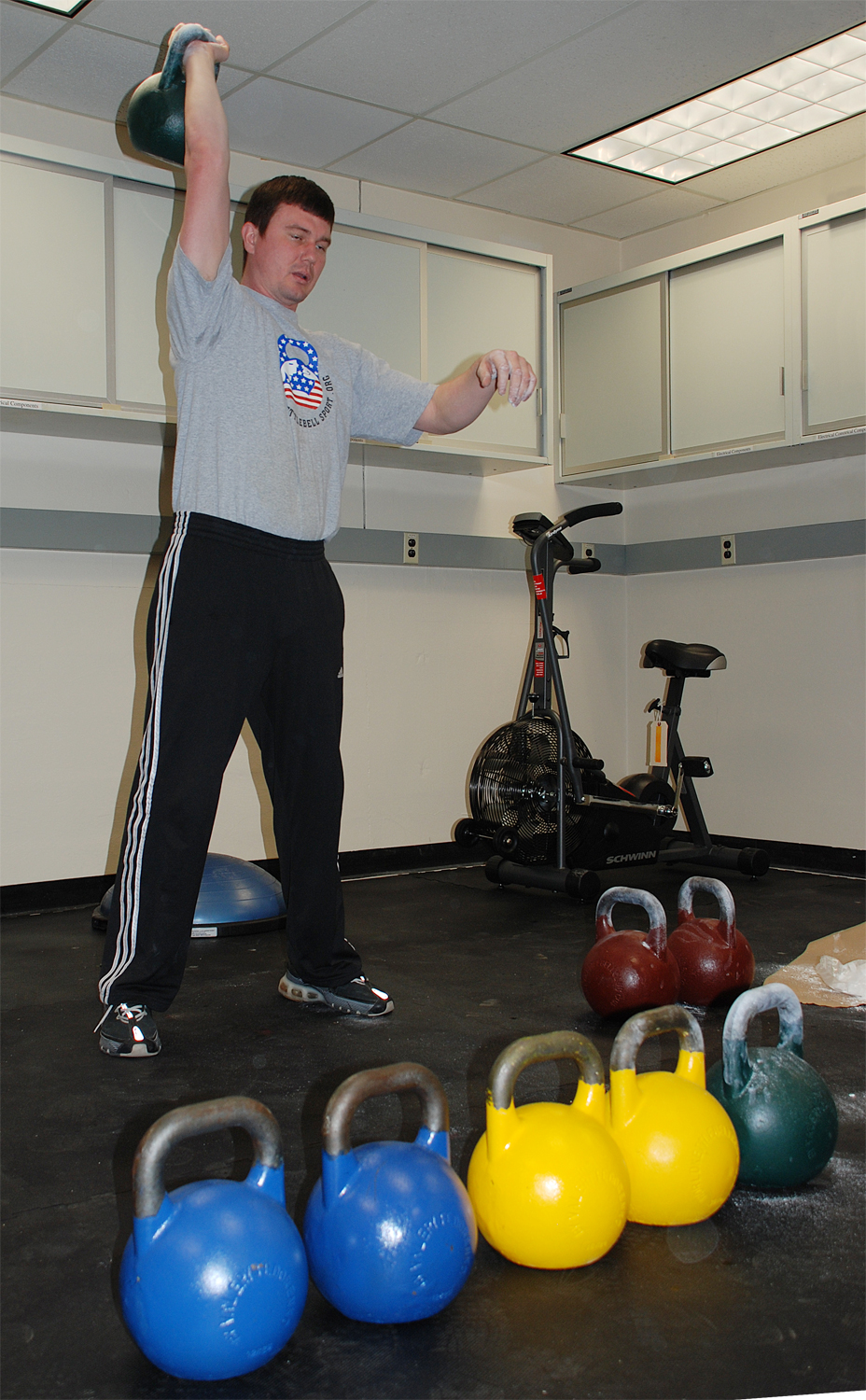
- Born: March 22, 1973 (age 52); Kyrgyzstan (USSR)

Valery Fedorenko is a Russian world record kettlebell lifter and coach who founded the World Kettlebell Club in 2006. While competing in Kettlebell lifting, Fedorenko achieved the title of "Honored Master of Sport", which is the sport's highest level of recognized skill.
