= Pikkardiyska Tertsiya =

Ukrainian a cappella vocal group

Pikkardiyska Tertsiya Піккардійська Терція
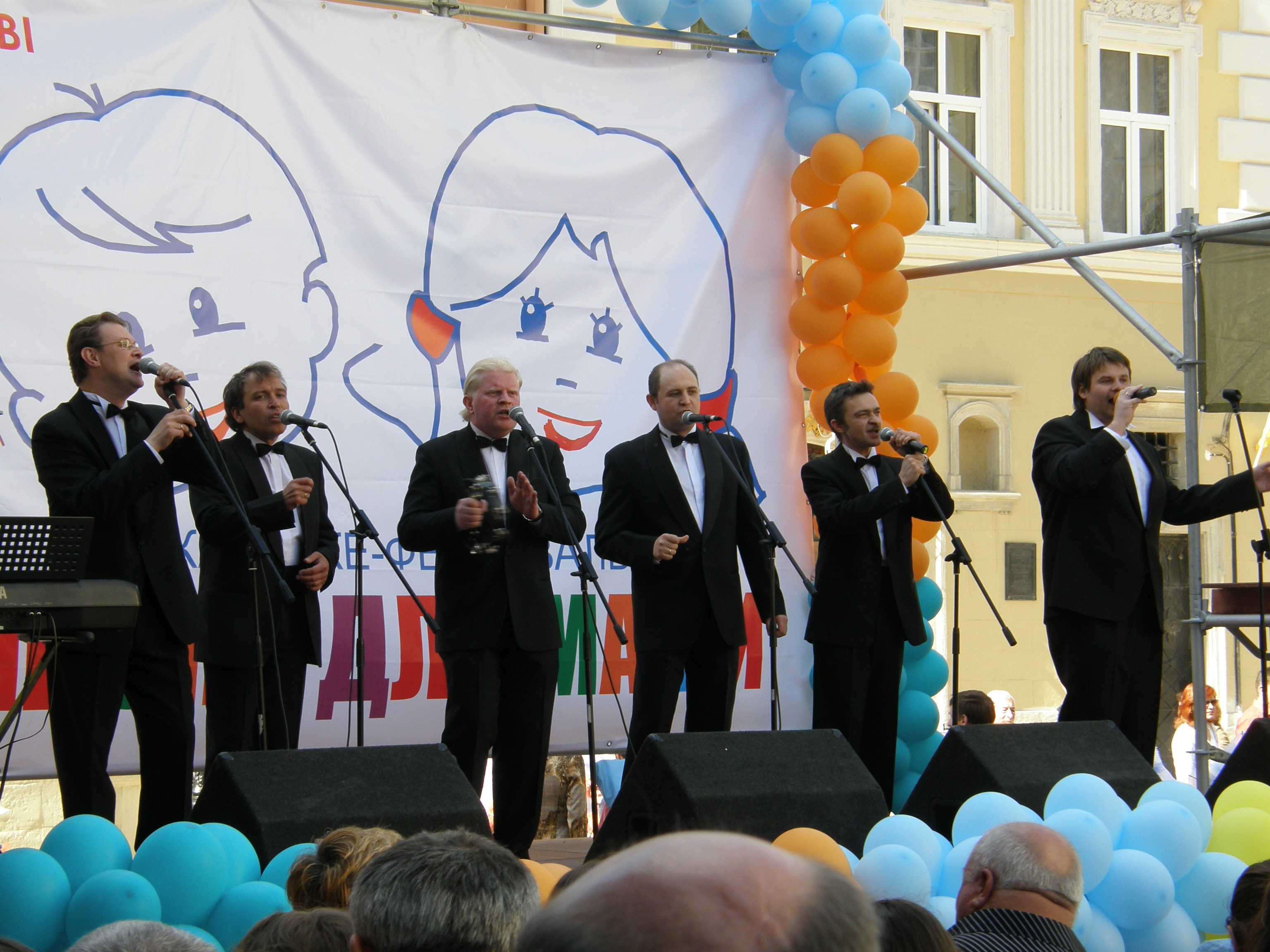
- Pikkardiyska Tertsiya - Піккардійська Терція

Background information
- Origin: Lviv, Ukraine
- Genres: A cappella
- Years active: 1992–present
- Members: Andriy Kapral’ Andriy Shavala; Volodymyr Yakyments’ Roman Turianyn; Yaroslav Nudyk
- Past members: Ivan Voshchyna; Bohdan Bohach
- Website: http://tercia.com.ua/

Pikkardiyska Tertsiya (Ukrainian: Вокальна формація «Піккардійська терція», lit. 'Picardy third') is a Ukrainian a cappella vocal group formed on 24 September 1992, in Lviv. The ensemble has won many musical awards in Ukraine.

== History ==
Pikkardiyska Tertsiya began with a quartet performing ancient Ukrainian music from the 15th century, along with adaptations of traditional Ukrainian folk songs. In time, the group expanded to six members with a repertoire of nearly 300 works, including liturgical music, folk songs, world hit songs as well as a good many original compositions from group members.

== Performances ==
In 13 years, Pikkardiyska Tertsiya has recorded six CDs, collaborated in projects with a variety of musicians and participates in charitable events: appearances on French television with proceeds donated to children suffering from cerebral palsy. Over the years, Pikkardiyska Tertsiya has performed throughout Ukraine and Poland and conducted concert tours of Germany, the United States, Canada, Italy, Russia and France.

The group has also taken part in many international competitions and performed as guest artists at such diverse festivals as "Songs of a United Europe" in Zielona Góra, Poland, "The Festival of Polish Songs" in Opole and the international festival, "Vokal Total" in Munich, Germany, where the group was the first representative from Eastern Europe to participate. Pikkardiyska Tertsiya had a memorable appearance at the international film festival Lato Filmów—Film Summer in Poland where by special request, they performed songs from film soundtracks for an entire hour.

In 1997, the group performed for Hillary Clinton at the Lviv Opera House during the First Lady's trip to Ukraine. Two years later, Pikkardiyska Tertsiya traveled to the United States for a tour of the East Coast of the U.S. with a special invitational performance in Washington, D.C.

In 2001, they were headliners at the Ukrainian Festival on Bloor Street in Toronto, followed with a big concert in that city's downtown and then another concert in Ottawa.

2004 was a big year with a concert tour to the United States, including concerts in Chicago, Philadelphia, Detroit, Washington, New York, Summerset and Cleveland, where they helped celebrate the 75th anniversary of that city's United Ukrainian Organizations.

In 2014 the group's song "Plyve Kacha" became known to a worldwide audience: It was played on Kyiv's central square Maidan Nezalezhnosti during the funeral for opposition fighters who had been killed following the revolutionary events of February 2014.

== Lineup ==
- Andriy Kapral’
- Andriy Shavala
- Volodymyr Yakymets'
- Roman Turianyn
- Yaroslav Nudyk

== Former members ==
- Ivan Voshchyna (died 2015)
- Bohdan Bohach (died 2025)

== Discography ==
=== Cassette tapes ===
1. 1995 – AD LIBITUM (Live at Lviv Organ House)
2. 1996 – Тиха ніч (Tykha nich, Silent night) (Live at Lviv Opera House)
3. 1999 – Я придумаю світ (Ya prydumayu svit, I will invent the world)

=== CD ===
1. 1994 – Піккардійська Терція (Pikkardiyska Tertsiya)
2. 1997 – Сад ангельских пісень (Sad anhel'skykh pisen', A Garden of Angelic Songs)
3. 1999 – Я придумаю світ (Ya prydumayu svit, I will invent the world)
4. 2002 – Tercja Pikardijska
5. 2002 – Ельдорадо (Eldorado)
6. 2003 – Українська колекція (Ukrainian collection)
7. 2003 – Антологія. Том 1 (Anthology. Volume 1)
8. 2004 – З Неба до Землі (Z Neba do Zemli, From Heaven to Earth)
9. 2006 – Антологія. Том 2. Фолк (Anthology. Volume 2. Folk)
10. 2009 – Етюди (Etudes)

=== Cooperation ===
1. 1996–98 – Ruslana – Кращі концерти Дзвінкого вітру (Krashchi kontserty Dzvinkoho vitru, The best concerts by Ringing wind).
2. 2003 – Ruslana – Добрий вечір тобі... (Dobryi vechir tobi..., Good evening to you...)
3. 2003 – Але час, як ріка (Ale chas, yak rika, But time is like a river)
