= Oleksii Yanin =

Ukrainian athlete and soldier (died 2022)

Personal information
- Citizenship: Ukrainian
- Born: 5 October 1983 Zaporizhzhia, Ukrainian SSR, Soviet Union
- Died: 7 April 2022 (aged 38) Mariupol

Oleksii Yanin (Ukrainian: Олексій Янін; 5 October 1983 – 7 April 2022, Mariupol) was a Ukrainian athlete and soldier. As a kickboxer, he ranked as the National champion in Ukraine. He also became the world champion in Thai boxing (Muay Thai).

== Biography ==
Oleksii Yanin was born on 5 October 1983 in the city of Zaporizhzhia. At the age of 9 he started boxing. At the age of 21, he went into Thai boxing.

Yanin joined the Armed Forces of Ukraine as a volunteer in 2014. He served in a separate special forces unit of the National Guard "Azov". He died on the night of the 6th and 7 April 2022 during the defense of Mariupol.

== Personal life ==
Oleksii is survived by his wife and son.

== See also ==
- List of Ukrainian sports figures killed during the Russo-Ukrainian war
