= Vitaly Merinov =

Ukrainian kickboxer (1990–2023)

- Born: 31 December 1990; Ivano-Frankivsk, Ukrainian SSR, Soviet Union
- Died: 31 March 2023 (aged 32); Ukraine
- Native name: Мерінов Віталій Олександрович
- Nationality: Ukrainian

Other information
- Occupation: Kickboxer
- Children: 1

Vitaly Oleksandrovych Merinov (Ukrainian: Віталій Олександрович Мерінов; 31 December 1990 – 31 March 2023) was a Ukrainian four-time world Kickboxing champion. He died after being injured while fighting against Russian forces during the Russian invasion of Ukraine.

== Kickboxing ==
Merinov was a four-time kickboxing world champion, Ukrainian universal combat champion, and a holder of the Ukrainian title master of sports in boxing. He acted also as a kickboxing coach.

== Russo-Ukrainian war ==
Merinov took part in the fighting to defend Ukraine from the beginning of the Russian invasion in February 2022. He received a gunshot wound in his leg. After he recovered, he returned to the front. Later, he was wounded again, and died in a hospital.

== Personal life ==
Merinov was married and had a daughter.

== See also ==
- List of Ukrainian sports figures killed during the Russo-Ukrainian war
