= Sokilnyky, Lviv Oblast =

Village in Lviv Oblast, Ukraine

Sokilnyky Сокільники
- Village
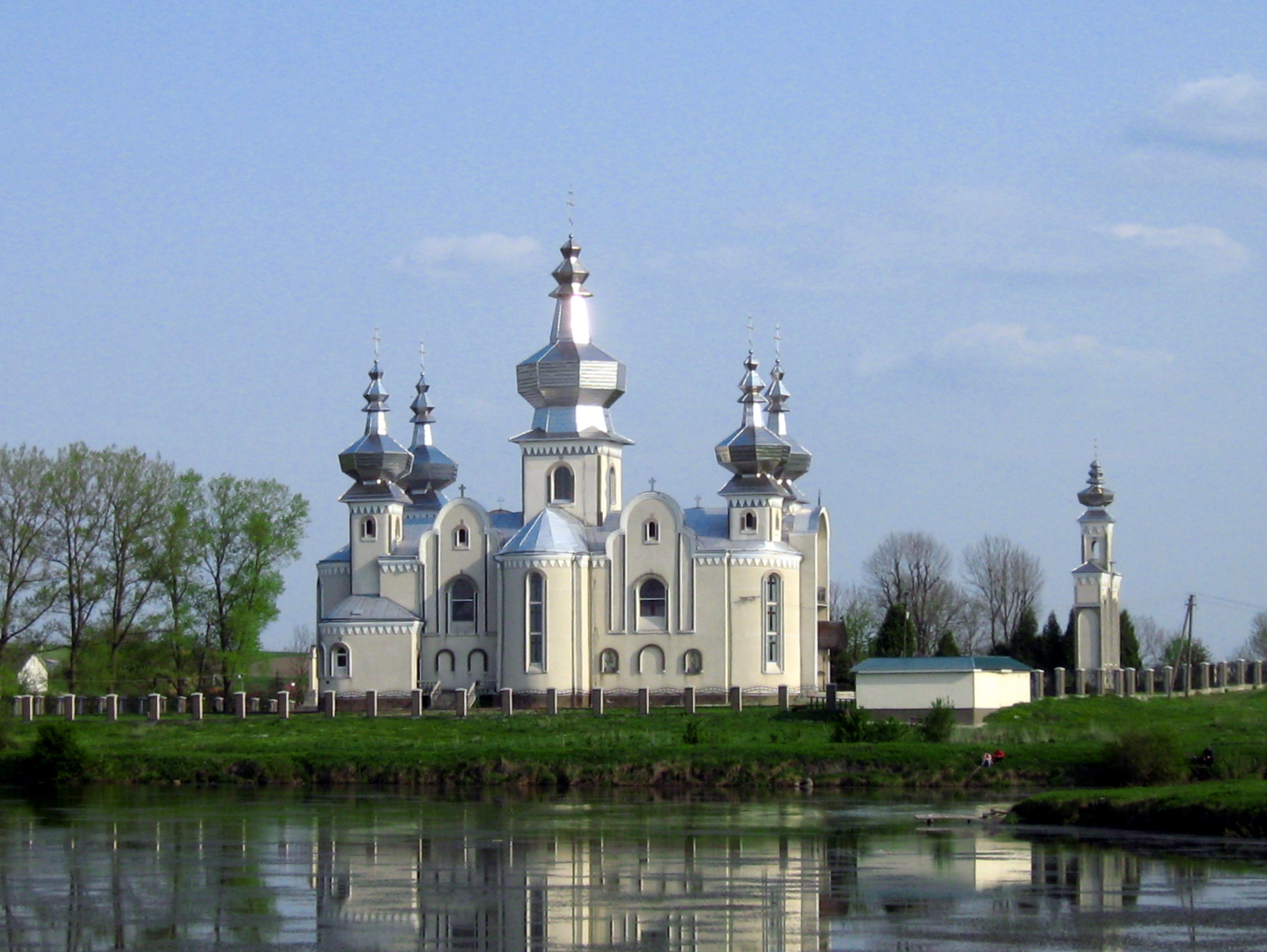

- Flag Coat of arms

- Location of Sokilnyky in Lviv Oblast Location of Sokilnyky in Ukraine
- Coordinates: 49°46′37″N 23°57′41″E
- Country: Ukraine
- Oblast: Lviv Oblast
- Raion: Lviv Raion
- Hromada: Sokilnyky rural hromada
- First mentioned: 1397

Government
  - Village head: Taras Sulymko

Population
  - Total: 7,618

Sokilnyky (Ukrainian: Сокільники; Polish: Sokolniki) is a village in Lviv Raion, Lviv Oblast, in western Ukraine. It is the administrative centre of Sokilnyky rural hromada, one of the hromadas of Ukraine. Its population is 7,618 (as of 2024).

== History ==
Sokilnyky was first mentioned in 1397. A Sokilnyky Raion, of which Sokilnyky was the capital, briefly existed between the Soviet annexation of Eastern Galicia and Volhynia and Operation Barbarossa.

The village has been a de facto suburb of the city of Lviv since the 1970s, and many people travel between Sokilnyky and Lviv for work purposes. The village's transition from communism to capitalism in the 1990s has been described as "exemplary" by the left-wing Ukrainian media portal Commons. A logistics centre for the Epicentr K chain of stores was under construction in the village as of December 2020.

== Notable people ==
- Andrii Dyhdalovych, activist, one of the Maidan casualties.
- Ihor Kovalevych, ceramist
- Roman Krokhmalnyi, soldier of the Armed Forces of Ukraine killed during the Russian invasion of Ukraine.
- Stepan Rodak, canoeist.
- Vitalii Sapylo, lieutenant of the Armed Forces of Ukraine killed during the Russian invasion of Ukraine.
- Ivan Voshchyna, musician.
