= Vitalii Sapylo =

Ukrainian soldier (2000–2022)

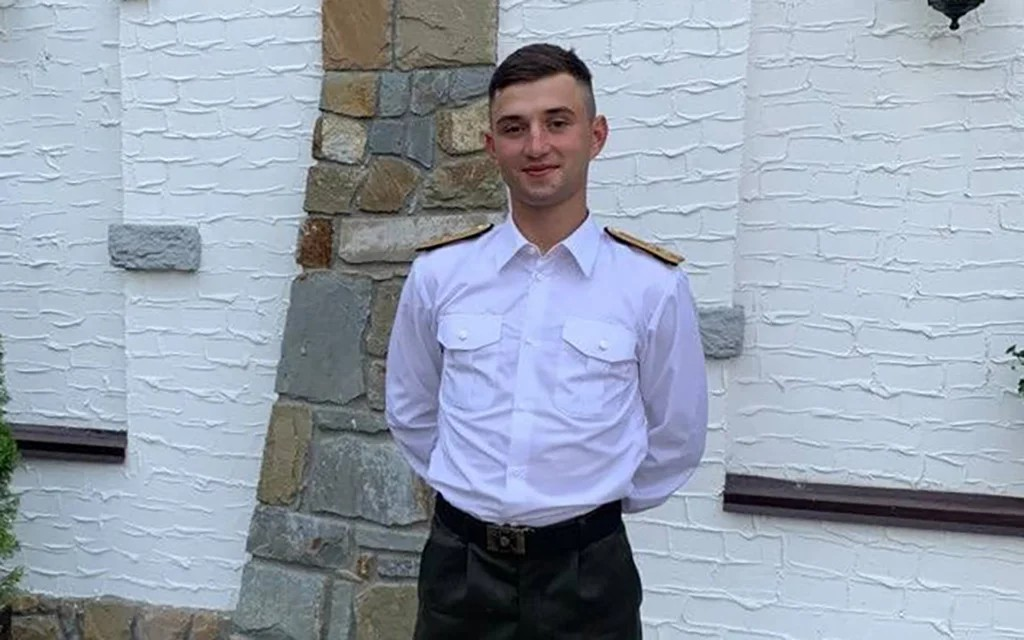
- Born: 3 September 2000; Sokilnyky, Ukraine
- Died: 25 February 2022 (aged 21); Near Kyiv, Ukraine
- Alma mater: Hetman Petro Sahaidachnyi National Ground Forces Academy
- Military career
- Allegiance: Ukraine
- Branch: Ukrainian Ground Forces
- Rank: Lieutenant
- Conflicts: Russo-Ukrainian War; Russian invasion of Ukraine
- Awards: Order of the Gold Star (posthumously)

Vitalii Romanovych Sapylo (Ukrainian: Віталій Романович Сапило; 3 September 2000 – 25 February 2022) was a lieutenant and the commander of a tank platoon in the 14th Separate Mechanized Brigade. He was a participant in the Russo-Ukrainian War.

== Biography ==
Sapylo was born in Sokilnyky, and he was a graduate of the FC Karpaty Lviv. He was invited to join FC Shakhtar Donetsk, but he chose the profession of defending his country and entered the Hetman Petro Sahaidachnyi National Ground Forces Academy in Lviv in 2017, where he studied at the Faculty of Combat Application of Forces. He completed his studies in June 2021.

As the commander of a tank platoon, he neutralized thirty enemy vehicles. He died alongside another soldier during the night of 25 February 2022, near the Ukrainian-Belarusian border, when a rocket fired by a Russian Su-25 ground attack aircraft hit his tank directly.

He was laid to rest on 28 February 2022, in his hometown. He is survived by his parents, a younger brother, and grandparents.

== Awards ==
On 2 March 2022, he was posthumously awarded the title of Hero of Ukraine with the Order of the Gold Star for personal courage and heroism demonstrated in defense of Ukraine's state sovereignty and territorial integrity, as well as for his loyalty to the military oath.

== See also ==
- List of Ukrainian sports figures killed during the Russo-Ukrainian war
