= Oleksandr Zakolodny =

Ukrainian mountaineer and climber

Personal information
- Born: Oleksandr Ivanovych Zakolodny; April 8, 1987 Kharkiv, Ukraine
- Died: January 21, 2023 (aged 35) Soledar, killed in action
- Occupation: climbing coach

Climbing career
- Type of climber: mountaineering
- Known for: Snow Leopard award
Medal record
Order for Courage

Oleksandr Ivanovych Zakolodny (Ukrainian: Олександр Володимирович ЗаколоднийApril 8, 1987 – January 21, 2023) was a Ukrainian mountaineer; a soldier of the Armed Forces of Ukraine, who served in the Kraken Regiment, a special volunteer unit of the Main Directorate of Intelligence of Ukraine (HUR) in the Russian-Ukrainian war. He was killed in action near the city of Soledar in Donetsk Oblast together with his friend Hryhoriy Hryhoriev.

== Personal and professional life ==
Oleksandr was born and lived in Kharkiv, where he graduated from Kharkiv State Academy of Physical Culture. Since 2020, he has served as the Chairperson of the Mountaineering Committee of the Mountaineering and Climbing Federation of Ukraine (MCFU) and Vice President of the MCFU. He also worked as a coach at the Vertical Climbing Center He took part in three expeditions to the eight-thousanders:

- Spring 2010 Makalu Expedition climbed a little new ground while summiting the South West Face. Three out of fifteen members reached the summit on May 23, namely Serhiy Bublyk, Volodymyr Roshko, and Dmytro Venislavsky. During the only summit attempt Zakolodny had, he was forced to descend due to his mate's illness. Zakolodny, who was the youngest member at the age of 22, did a great part of the team job
- Fall 2010 Cho Oyu Expedition which wasn't successful due to weather conditions.
- 2013 Nanga Parbat Expedition, which suffered from the terror attack to a high-altitude mountaineering base camp at an altitude of approximately 4200m. Three team members were killed in the attack. Zakolodny was higher on the mount at the time.

== See also ==
- List of Ukrainian sports figures killed during the Russo-Ukrainian war
