= Maksym Kagal =

Ukrainian kickboxer (1991–2022)

- Kagal with Azov Regiment flag

Personal information
- Citizenship: Ukraine
- Born: 1 December 1991 Kremenchuk, Ukrainian SSR, USSR
- Died: 25 March 2022 (aged 30) Mariupol, Ukraine

Maksym Volodymyrovych Kagal (Ukrainian: Максим Володимирович Кагал; 1 December 1991 – 25 March 2022) was a Ukrainian athlete-kickboxer and a soldier.

== Career ==
Maskym Kagal was a world champion on the national team of Ukraine and bronze medalist in kickboxing according to ISKA 2014. He was a silver medalist of the open championship of Kremenchuk in rugby-7. Kagal was a bronze medalist in the K-1 section (weight category up to 60 kg).

== Death ==
He served in the Azov Battalion as a senior lieutenant under the call sign "Piston". On 25 March 2022, he was killed defending Mariupol from Russian forces. He was posthumously awarded Hero of Ukraine.

== See also ==
- List of Ukrainian sports figures killed during the Russo-Ukrainian war
