= Pēteris Martinsons =

Latvian ceramist, illustrator, and art teacher (1931–2013)

- Born: 28 January 1931; Daugavpils
- Died: 2 August 2013 (aged 82); Riga
- Education: University of Latvia
- Occupations: Ceramist, illustrator, and art teacher
- Awards: Order of the Three Stars

Pēteris Martinsons (28 January 1931 – 2 August 2013) was a Latvian ceramist, illustrator, and art teacher. He created dishes and other objects from various materials and illustrated books. Member of the International Academy of Ceramics. He participated in the films "Puika" (1977) and "Tumšie brieži" (2006).

== Biography ==
He was born in 1931 in Daugavpils to store salesman Pēteris Martinsons and his wife Aleksandra, née Pīpe, in a family with three children. In 1938, he began his studies at Daugavpils 2nd City Primary School. During World War II, after the Red Army offensive on Daugavpils in the summer of 1944, the family moved to Mazsalaca, and later to Alūksne, where he graduated from Alūksne Secondary School in 1950.

He studied at the Faculty of Civil Engineering, Department of Architecture, of the University of Latvia (1951–1957). He worked as a process engineer in a research laboratory (1957–1958) and as an architect at the "Latgiprogorstroy" design institute (1958–1962). In his free time, he was passionate about mountaineering. In 1961, he became a member of the Latvian Association of Architects.

In 1962, he began teaching at the Riga Secondary School of Applied Arts (1962–1971). In 1964, he organized his first ceramics exhibition, and in 1965, he started working at the Latvian Art Foundation's experimental ceramic workshop in Ķīpsala. He participated in exhibitions and won awards at several international exhibitions. In 1968, he became a member of the Latvian Association of Artists and worked in the departments of decorative and applied arts and industrial art at the Art Academy of Latvia (1968–2001). In the mid-1980s, he worked at the Lviv Experimental Ceramic and Sculptural Factory (collaborating with Ihor Kovalevych). P. Martinsons' works have been exhibited at numerous international ceramic exhibitions in Latvia, Lithuania, Estonia, Italy, France, Poland, Germany, and the USA. Solo exhibitions of his works have been held in Latvia, Lithuania, Estonia, Ukraine, Finland, the US, Sweden, Hungary, and other countries.

He designed sets for several productions by Mara Ķimele at the Valmiera Drama Theatre (1976, 1979). As an actor, he appeared in the feature film "Puika" directed by Aivars Freimanis and in Viestur Kairish film "Tumšie brieži".

He died in 2013.

== Characteristics of creativity ==
Martinsons ceramic compositions were crafted from clay, clinker, porcelain, or stoneware. In the first half of the 1970s, his ceramic object-compositions exhibited a distinctly constructive and technically stable character. Their forms were based on geometric figures such as cubes, pyramids, and spheres. In the latter half of the 1970s, and throughout the 1980s and 1990s, Martinsons works predominantly featured freely formed plastic shapes. His architectural works garnered numerous accolades at international ceramic exhibitions, including three gold medals and awards in Faenza (Italy), as well as awards in Gdańsk and Sopot (Poland).

== Awards ==
- Merited Figure of Arts of Latvian SSR (1988)
- Order of the Three Stars (2001)
