= Kharkiv State Academy of Physical Culture =

University in Kharkiv, Ukraine,

Coordinates: 50.00415°N 36.21732°E

- Харківська державна академія фізичної культури
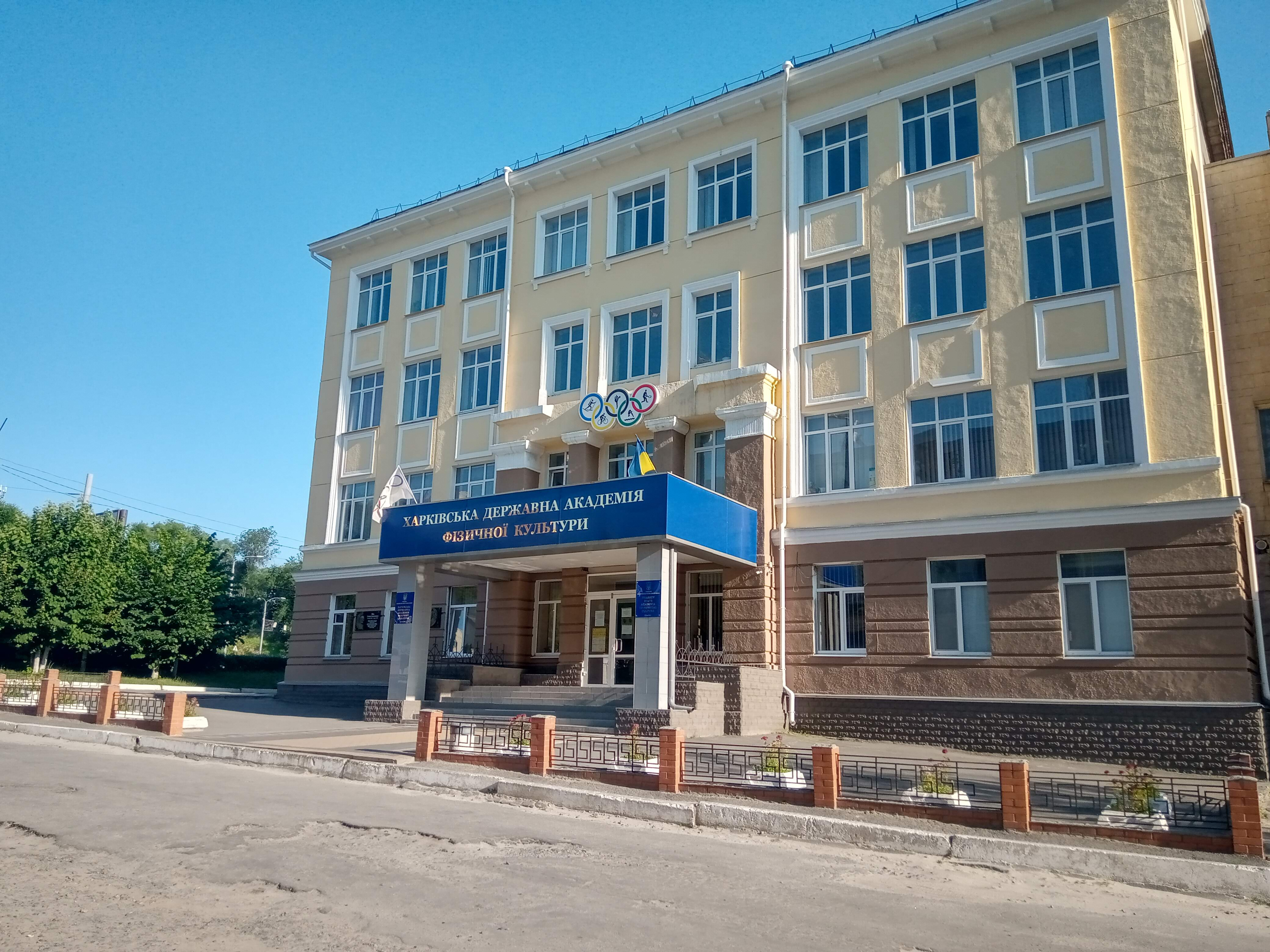
- Established: 1930; 96 years ago
- Affiliations: Ministry of Education and Science of Ukraine
- Rector: Mulyk Viacheslav
- Students: 2 000
- Location: Kharkiv, Ukraine
- Website: khdafk.com.ua
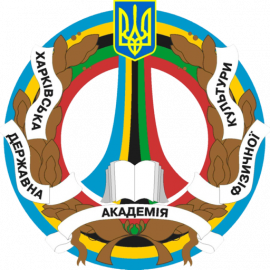

The Kharkiv State Academy of Physical Culture is a Ukrainian Academy of university accreditation level in Kharkiv.

== History ==
The university opened in 1930 as the National Institute of Physical Education of Ukraine in Kharkiv. Between 1930-1944 was renamed to the National Institute of Physical Education of Ukraine; in 1979-1989 – Sport Faculty of Kyiv State Institute of Physical Culture; 1989-2001 – Kharkiv State University of Physical Culture. In 1944 the institute was transferred to Kiev and changed its name to Kyiv State Institute of Physical Education.

== Institutes and faculties ==
The Academy consists of 4 colleges, 5 faculties, 18 departments, the Preparatory Centre for foreign students, the School of Outstanding Sportsmanship, a scientific and research centre, the Centre of Computer technologies and information support of the process of physical education and sports. The Academy also provides post graduate courses for its students.

- Faculty of Sport Games and Martial Arts;
- Faculty of Cyclic Sports;
- Faculty of Physical Education and Health;
- Faculty of extramural (distance learning), re-qualification and postgraduate education.

== Sports and supporting facilities ==
- Faculties.
- Departments.
- Educational and scientific-methodical department.
- Department of International Cooperation.
- Department for promotion of the employment of students and graduates.
- Library.
- Technical Department.
- Reading Hall.
- Sports facilities.
- Athletic Club.
- Research laboratory.

== Notable alumni ==
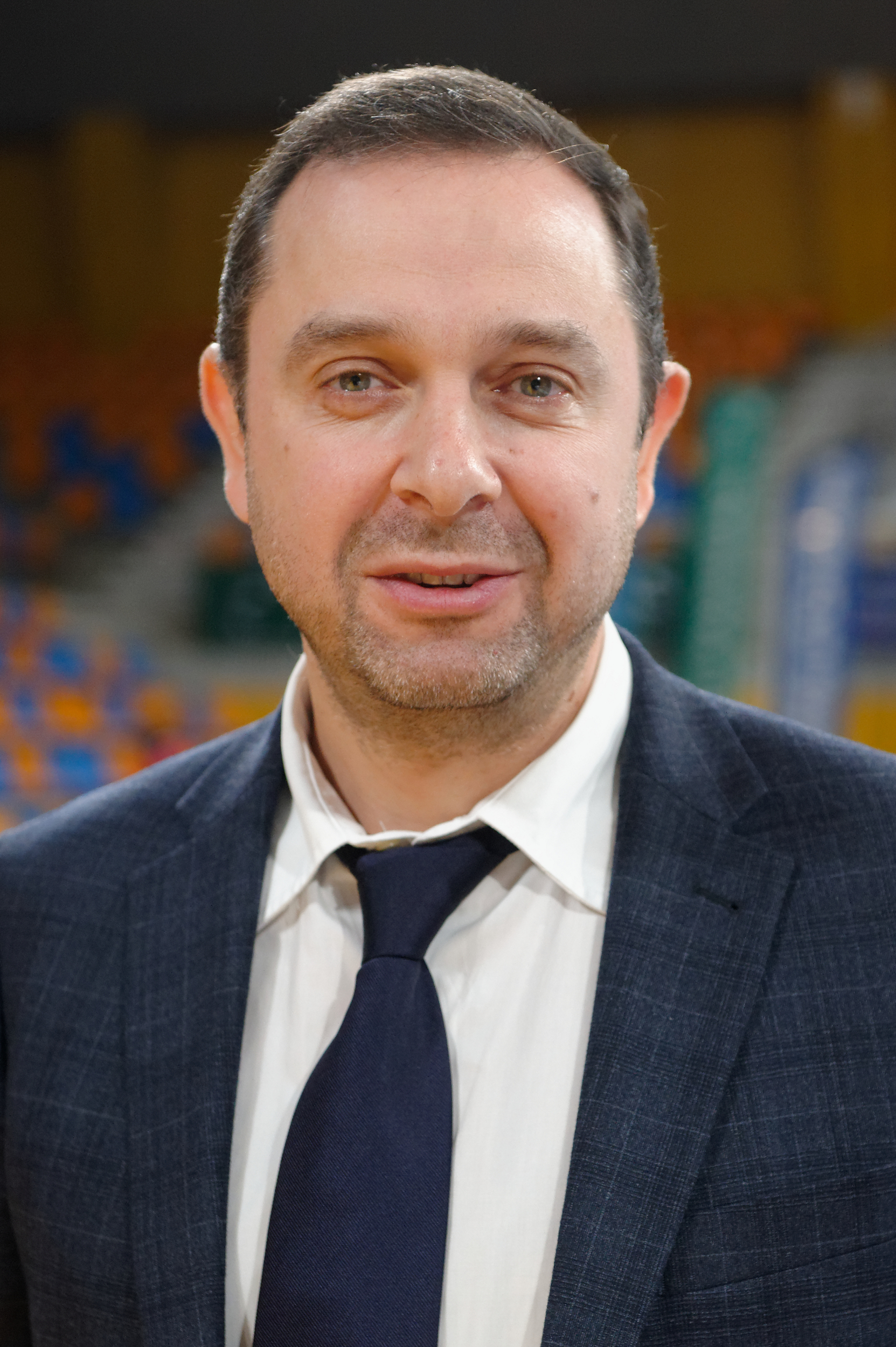
Vadym Gutzeit

- Ihor Bodrov (born 1987), sprinter
- Vadim Garbuzov, world champion in professional show dance, Latin and Standard 2015
- Vadym Gutzeit (born 1971), saber fencer, Olympic and Maccabiah champion, Youth and Sport Minister of Ukraine
- Anna Kornuta (born 1988), Olympic long jumper
- Maryna Kylypko (born 1999), Olympic pole vaulter
- Igor Olshanetskyi (born 1986), Israeli Olympic weightlifter
- Elbrus Tedeyev (born 1974), Olympic champion wrestler
- Oleksandr Zakolodny (1987-2023), mountaineer

== See also ==
List of universities in Ukraine
