= Riga Porcelain Museum =

Museum in Latvia

- Rīgas Porcelāna muzejs

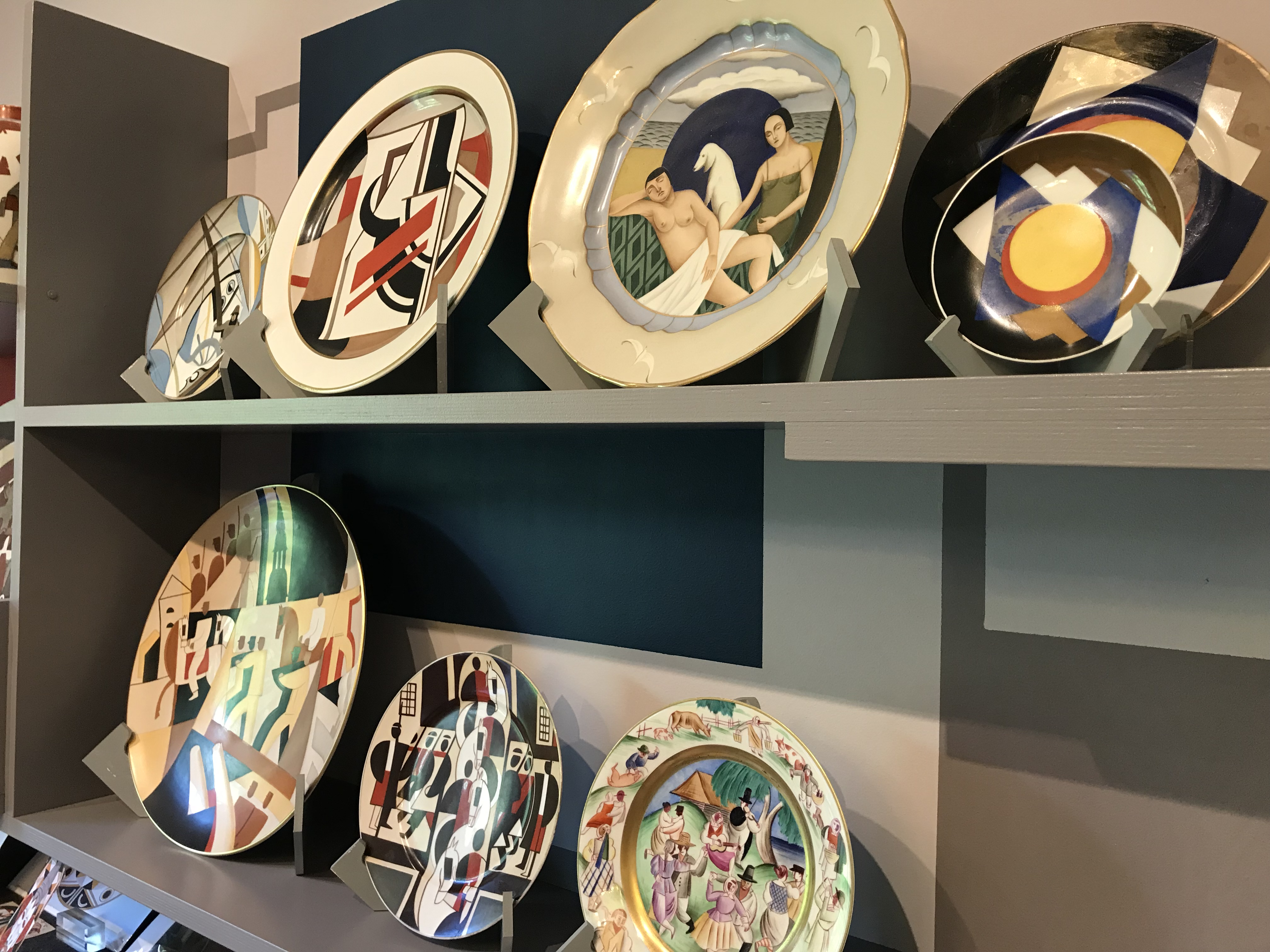
- Established: 30 October 2001
- Location: Kalēju iela (Rīga) 9-11, Rīga, Latvia
- Coordinates: 56°56′54″N 24°06′37″E
- Type: Art museum
- Director: Santa Dobele
- Website: porcelanamuzejs.riga.lv

Riga Porcelain Museum is a ceramics museum in Riga, Latvia.

The museum opened on October 30, 2001. The museum regularly temporarily displays contemporary solo work by Latvian porcelain artists such as Aris Seglins, Pēteris Martinsons, Zanete Zvigure, Inese Līne, and others.
