= Ivan Voshchyna =

Ivan Voshchyna Іван Миронович Вощина
- Born: Ivan Myronovych Voshchyna; September 6, 1957; Sokilnyky, Lviv Oblast, Ukrainian SSR, Soviet Union
- Origin: Ukraine
- Died: September 5, 2015 (aged 57) Lutsk, Ukraine
- Genres: Rock, folk rock, a cappella
- Occupation: Musician
- Instruments: Drum kit, tambourine, maracas
- Years active: ?–2015
- Formerly of: Pikkardiyska Tertsiya

Ivan Voshchyna (6 September 1957 – 5 September 2015) was a Ukrainian musician, drummer of the bands "Pikkardiyska Tertsiya" and "The Mandry" ("Lvivs'ki mandry"). He worked with "Pikkardiyska Tertsiya" since 2008.

As a member of "Pikkardiyska Tertsiya", he gave his last concert in Lutsk on September 5, 2015, and died shortly after it in the dressing room. According to the report of the organizers of the concert, it was thrombosis that caused the musician's sudden death. Ivan Voshchyna had only 1 more day to live before his 58th birthday.
Ivan was buried in Sokil'nyky, his native village near Lviv.
