= Hodovytsia =

Village in Lviv Oblast, Ukraine

Hodovytsia Годовиця
- Village
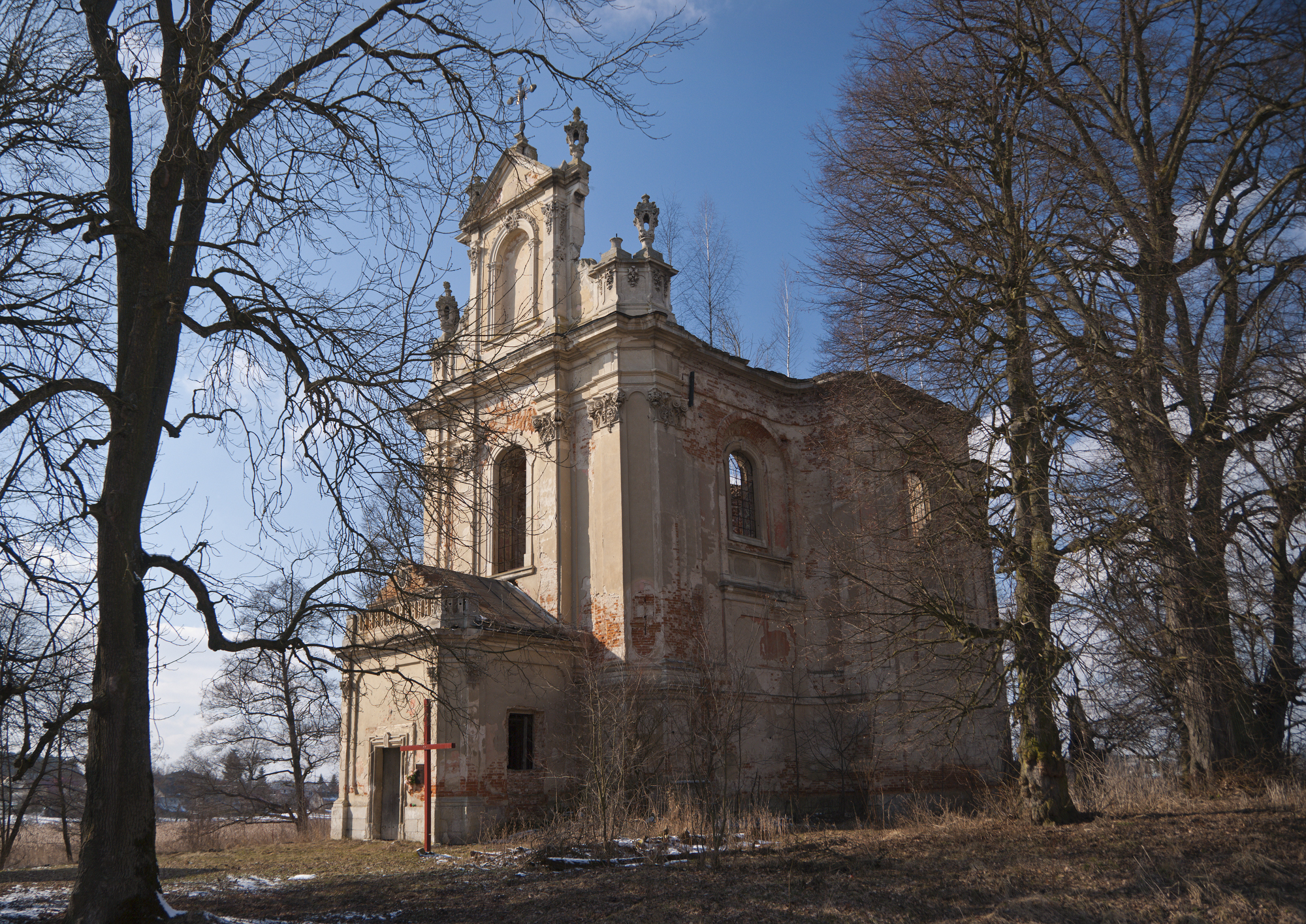

- Location within Lviv Oblast Location within Ukraine
- Coordinates: 49°45′51″N 23°55′09″E
- Country: Ukraine
- Oblast: Lviv Oblast
- District: Lviv Raion
- Established: 1371

Area
  - Total: 3.2 km^{2} (1.2 sq mi)
- Elevation /(average value of): 305 m (1,001 ft)

Population
  - Total: 871
- Time zone: UTC+2 (EET)
  - Summer (DST): UTC+3 (EEST)
- Postal code: 81117
- Area code: +380 3230

Hodovytsia (Ukrainian: Годовиця) is a village in Lviv Raion, Lviv Oblast in western Ukraine. It belongs to Sokilnyky rural hromada, one of the hromadas of Ukraine.

Until 18 July 2020, Hodovytsia belonged to Pustomyty Raion. The raion was abolished in July 2020 as part of the administrative reform of Ukraine, which reduced the number of raions of Lviv Oblast to seven. The area of Pustomyty Raion was merged into Lviv Raion.
