= Liudmyla Kovalevych =

Ukrainian ceramic artist (born 1953)

- Людмила Сергіївна Ковалевич
- Born: 3 July 1953 (age 73); Lviv
- Education: Lviv Institute of Applied and Decorative Arts
- Occupation: Ceramic artist

Liudmyla Kovalevych (Ukrainian: Людмила Сергіївна Ковалевич; born 3 July 1953) is a Ukrainian ceramic artist. Member of the National Union of Artists of Ukraine (1986).

== Biography ==
Liudmyla Kovalevych was born on 3 July 1953, in Lviv.

In 1975, she graduated from the Lviv Institute of Applied and Decorative Arts (Zenovii Flinta's workshop). She has been engaged in creative work ever since.

== Creativity ==
She works in the fields of decorative and applied ceramics and textiles. In 1975, she began exhibiting her works at regional, national (all-Ukrainian), and international exhibitions. Solo exhibitions took place in Kyiv (1994, 2005). Her oeuvre primarily consists of decorative ceramic compositions.

Among important works:

- Decorative compositions: "Babbyne lito" (1985), "Podorozh iz dochkoiu" (1986), "Dereva vzymku" (1992), "Berehy" (1996), "Narodzhennia ornamentu" (1998), "Kashtany" (1999), "Iрrashky oseni" (2000), "Kupyla mama meni konia", "Kolyskova" (both 2010), "Bilyi den" (2011), "Chumatskyi Shliakh" (2012).

== Awards ==
- Grand Prix of the International Ceramics Exhibition (Zagreb, 2001).

== Bibliography ==
- Kovalevych Liudmyla Serhiivna / B. N. Skyba // Encyclopedia of Modern Ukraine [Online] / Eds. : I. М. Dziuba, A. I. Zhukovsky, M. H. Zhelezniak [et al.] ; National Academy of Sciences of Ukraine, Shevchenko Scientific Society. – Kyiv : The NASU institute of Encyclopedic Research, 2013.
- Голубець О. Львівська кераміка. — Київ: Наукова думка, 1991.
- Чегусова З. Декоративне мистецтво України кінця ХХ століття. 200 імен: Альбом-каталог. — Київ, 2002.
