= Sokilnyky rural hromada =

Hromada in Lviv Oblast, Ukraine

Sokilnyky rural hromada Сокільницька сільська громада
- Hromada
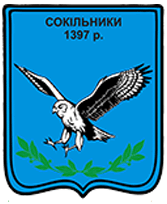
- Seal
- Interactive map of Sokilnyky rural hromada
- Country: Ukraine
- Oblast: Lviv Oblast
- Admin. center: Sokilnyky

Area
  - Total: 329 km^{2} (127 sq mi)

Population (2021)
  - Total: 8,448
  - Density: 25.7/km^{2} (66.5/sq mi)
- CATOTTG code: UA46060410000052681
- Settlements: 3
- Villages: 3
- Website: sokilnyky-rada.gov.ua

Sokilnyky rural hromada (Ukrainian: Сокільницька сільська громада) is a hromada in Ukraine, in Lviv Raion of Lviv Oblast. The administrative center is the village of Sokilnyky.

== Settlements ==
The hromada consists of 3 villages: Sokilnyky, Basivka, and Hodovytsia.
