= Puika =

1977 film by Aivars Freimanis

Puika is a 1977 Latvian Soviet Socialist Republic film directed by Aivars Freimanis. The film received the Lielais Kristaps award for best film in 1977, the competition's inaugural year.
