= Kettlebell lifting =

Form of lifting exercise

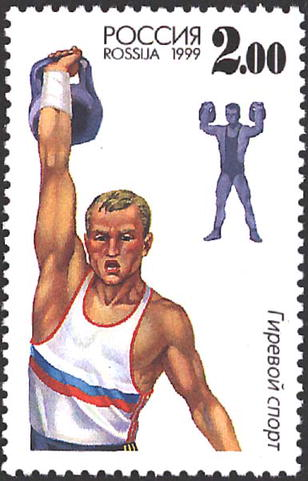
Russian stamp with kettlebell lifting theme (snatch and jerk depicted).

Kettlebell lifting, also known as kettlebell sport or girevoy sport (Russian: гиревой спорт), is a competitive weightlifting sport in which athletes perform repeated kettlebell lifts over a fixed period of time.

The sport developed into a standardized competitive discipline in the Soviet Union during the 1960s; the first formal competition rules were adopted in 1962.

== Lifts ==
The sport consists of three main lifts: the snatch, jerk and the long cycle. Jerk and Long Cycle can be performed with one bell or two kettlebells of equal weight.

- Snatch: A single kettlebell is swung using one hand from between the knees to above the head in a single motion.
- Jerk: Two kettlebells are grasped in each hand and swung to the 'rack position' at chest level, then jerked above the head. It can be performed with one kettlebell.
- Long Cycle: Two kettlebells are cleaned from knee level to chest level, then jerked to above the head. It can be performed with one kettlebell.

== Rules ==
Competition rules vary between governing organizations and event formats. In classic kettlebell sport, athletes perform repeated lifts for a fixed period of time, with valid repetitions requiring an overhead fixation. Ten-minute sets are widely used in traditional competition formats.

The principal classic disciplines are jerk, snatch and long cycle. Biathlon combines jerk and snatch as two separate events, while long cycle combines a clean with a jerk. Snatch is performed with one kettlebell.

In the classic snatch format, the athlete may change hands once during the ten-minute set. A repetition is counted after the kettlebell is held motionless in the required overhead fixation position.

Other formats include shorter sets and endurance events. WKSF rules provide competition durations of 3, 5 and 10 minutes, as well as 30-minute half-marathon and 60-minute marathon events; longer formats permit multiple hand changes in one-arm disciplines.

== Terminology ==
- KB – often used abbreviation for kettlebell.
- Pendulum – path the kettlebell takes as it moves from between the legs to either the rack or overhead position in Snatch.
- Swing—kettlebell movement that involves moving the bell in a pendulum motion from between the legs to the overhead position. Basic and start-up kettlebell exercise. Can be performed with one or two hands. There are two variations: Russian swing and American swing.
  - Backswing – the portion of the swing or snatch in which the bell is moving backward between the legs.
  - Upswing – the portion of the swing or snatch in which the bell is moving forward and up towards the top of the swing or overhead position.
- Rack position – the V-position of the shoulder, elbow, and wrist on the torso where the kettlebell rests between repetitions of jerk or long cycle. Ideally the elbow rests on the top portion of the hip joint.
- Lockout – when the arm is fully extended in the overhead position---wrist over shoulder, and the knees are straight as if you are standing in an upside down handstand.
- Joint stacking – Ensuring proper alignment of joints in overhead lockout position, meaning a straight line can be drawn from wrist to elbow to shoulder to hip to knees to ankles.
- Fixation – when the lifter and kettlebell completely stop all movement at the completion of a repetition, the component of a lift that determines whether the repetition will be counted towards the competition score; also a chance to rest.
- Clean – kettlebell movement that involves moving the bell using the hips in a pendulum motion from between the legs to chest level in front of the body in the Rack position or the top of the swing position.
  - Hang clean –
- Jerk – kettlebell movement that uses the triple extension (see definition below) to launch the kettlebell from the rack position to overhead position. Jerk begins with a dynamic push-press (see definition below) with the heels lifting, followed by a squat under the overhead lockout and finishing with standing up with straight legs.
  - OAJ – one arm jerk—using one kettlebell.
  - Double Jerk, Jerk or TAJ (two arm jerk) – uses 2 kettlebells.
- Triple extension – Full extension of the hips, knees, and ankles that provides the power to launch the kettlebell overhead in the jerk movement.
- Long Cycle (also called long jerk or (kettlebell) clean and jerk) – kettlebell movement that is composed of the clean, followed by the jerk, then a drop to the rack and the re-cleaned for the next jerk.
  - TALC – two arm long cycle, meaning long cycle with two kettlebells
  - OALC – one arm long cycle, meaning long cycle with one kettlebell
- Snatch – kettlebell movement that uses the legs and hips to move the kettlebell from the swing into the overhead position.
  - Half snatch – kettlebell movement in which dropping into rack is substituted for the snatch drop.
  - Black snatch – a method of training grip and endurance for snatch in which one or multiple swings are added before each snatch. Repeat for desired amount of time (or until you drop the bell).
  - Olympic snatch – A style of snatch in which the backswing is eliminated and the bell moves in a straighter path up and down, often employed once the lifter's forearms have fatigued at the end of a set.
  - Hang snatch.
- Switch – when the lifter changes the arm used with the kettlebell. – one switch rule (classic International Union of Kettlebell Lifting competition) or unlimited/multiple switches rule (marathon International Kettlebell Marathon Federation competition).
  - Speed switch.
  - Single/one hand switch.
  - Two-hand switch – not allowed.
- Static/dead hang – when the lifter is just holding the Kbell without moving — not allowed in competitions.
- Rebounding – not allowed.
- Push press – kettlebell movement that utilizes strength from legs to get the bell to the overhead position.
- Clean and push Press – kettlebell movement that is composed of the clean, followed by the push press.
- Press / military press – kettlebell movement that relies on the strength of the arm alone to get to the overhead position.
- Clean and press – kettlebell movement that is composed of the clean, followed by the press.
- Kettlebell high pulls / kettlebell standing pull-up – kettlebell movement; kettlebell is between the feet then grabbed with both arms maintaining flat back then ascended and raised to waist followed by pulling it directly in front of the face (elbows stay high and reach eye height (handle is at chin level)).
- Windmill – kettlebell movement; stance is wider than shoulder width. Kettlebell is held above head with straight arms. If KB is held in the right hand, the body is inclining to left side in an attempt to touch floor with left hand and vice versa.
- Set – length of time a kettlebell lift is performed for.
- RPM – repetitions per minute, which is used to pace a kettlebell set.
- Kettlebell coefficient – allows comparing results achieved using kettlebells of different weights in the same weight class and in the same discipline (each KB weight has an assigned coefficient). Score is then calculated as number of repetitions x KB coefficient. Used in Ultimate Girevik Cup.
- (kettlebell) grips – regular grip, reverse grip, pinch grip, finger grip, ball grip.
- (kettlebell) holds – 1 KB/2 hands, 1 KB/1 hand, 2 KB/1 hand (holds both kettlebells), 2 KB/2 hands (each holds a kettlebell), 2 KB Squared (2 hands hold 2 kettlebells in each hand).
  - one hand holds - one hand hold, horn, bottom up.
  - two hand holds - two hand hold, horn squeeze, horn taffy pull, two hand bottom up, waiter, crusher, foot in handle, farmer hold.
- kettle clamp – gear that enables transformation of ordinary dumbbell into a kettlebell.

== Organizations ==
Kettlebell lifting is governed internationally by several organizations. Two organizations that hold international championships are the International Union of Kettlebell Lifting (IUKL) and the World Kettlebell Sport Federation (WKSF).

The IUKL organizes international kettlebell lifting competitions and represents national kettlebell organizations from multiple continents. In 2017, the Global Association of International Sports Federations (GAISF) granted the IUKL observer status. SportAccord has also profiled the IUKL as an international federation, noting that it had national members across Europe, Asia, Oceania, Africa and the Americas.

The World Kettlebell Sport Federation was established in 2017 and organizes international competitions, including World and continental championships. Its World Championships attract competitors from multiple countries; for example, the 2026 championship in Chișinău, Moldova, included more than 500 athletes from around 30 countries.

== World Championships ==
Both the International Union of Kettlebell Lifting (IUKL) and the World Kettlebell Sport Federation (WKSF) organize World Championships.

Year	IUKL	WKSF
2010	Tampere, Finland	—
2011	Nanuet, United States	—
2012	Šiauliai, Lithuania	—
2013	Tyumen, Russia	—
2014	Hamburg, Germany	—
2015	Dublin, Ireland	—
2016	Aktobe, Kazakhstan	—
2017	Seoul, South Korea	—
2018	Daugavpils, Latvia	Milan, Italy
2019	Novi Sad, Serbia	Gormanston, Ireland
2020	Saint Petersburg, Russia	Madrid, Spain
2021	Budapest, Hungary	Milan, Italy
2022	New Delhi, India	Maia, Portugal
2023	Khiva, Uzbekistan; Daugavpils, Latvia	Hódmezővásárhely, Hungary
2024	Corfu, Greece; Cholpon-Ata, Kyrgyzstan	Rzeszów, Poland
2025	—	Busto Arsizio, Italy
2026	—	Chișinău, Moldova

- The 2012 IUKL World Championship in Šiauliai was held during the 5th TAFISA World Sport for All Games, which took place in Šiauliai in July 2012.
- The 2020 WKSF World Championship, originally planned for Spain, was cancelled after WKSF cancelled or postponed its 2020 events during the COVID-19 pandemic.
- The 2023 IUKL World Championship in Khiva took place during the International Ethnosport Festival and Ethnosport Summit held in Khiva in September 2023.
