= Volodymyr Marchuk =

Ukrainian painter (born 1953)

- Володимир Павлович Марчук
- Born: 27 August 1953 (age 73); Kliusk, now Volyn Oblast, Ukraine
- Education: Lviv Institute of Applied and Decorative Arts
- Awards: Merited Figure of Arts of Ukraine, Meritorious Activist of Culture

Volodymyr Marchuk (Ukrainian: Володимир Павлович Марчук; born 27 August 1953) is a Ukrainian painter. Member of the National Union of Artists of Ukraine (1990). Head of the Volyn Regional Organization of the National Union of Artists of Ukraine (from 1994).

== Biography ==
Volodymyr Marchuk was born on 27 August 1953 in Kliusk, now the Turiisk hromada of the Kovel Raion, Volyn Oblast, Ukraine.

In 1980, Marchuk graduated from the Lviv Institute of Applied and Decorative Arts (teachers: Teofil Maksysko, Volodymyr Ovsiichuk, Volodymyr Rybotytskyi). From then until 1994 he worked in Volyn art and production workshops.

For a long time, he was the main organizer and curator of exhibitions at the Art Gallery of the Volyn Organization of the National Union of Artists of Ukraine. Co-initiator and co-organizer of a joint long-term Ukrainian-Polish icon painting plein air in the village of Zamlynnia, in the border part of Volyn. During this event, half a thousand icons were created and exhibited 75 times in Ukraine and Poland.

== Works ==
From 1989 – participant of regional and all-Ukrainian exhibitions. Personal exhibitions – in Lviv, Truskavets (both – 2010); Chełm, Lublin, Ciechanów (all – 2013, Poland).

Creates in the fields of easel and monumental painting. His oeuvre includes works with deep symbolism and national color, in particular: landscapes, still lifes in realistic style, as well as paintings on sacred themes. Some of them are kept in the Volyn Art Gallery (Lutsk).

Main paintings:

- diptychs – "Na Svitiazi" (1988), "Obrazy" (2000);
- triptychs – "Sviati", "Velyka utopiia" (both – 1992); "Volyn. Narodzhennia siuzhetu", "Tryvoha", "Rivnovaha", "Dolia", "Poshuky mynuloho" (all – 1989), "Zvir zaliakuvannia" (1990), "Peretvorennia" (1991), "Povnia" (1994), "Dvoie" (1999);
- series – "Rekonstruktsiia" (1988), "Nostalhiia" (2008–2015).

== Awards ==
- Merited Figure of Arts of Ukraine (2017)
- Meritorious Activist of Culture (2012)
