= Roman Vasylyk =

Ukrainian painter, iconographer (born 1947)

- Роман Якимович Василик
- Born: 8 October 1947 (age 78); Barysh, Ternopil Oblast (now Ukraine)
- Education: Lviv Institute of Decorative and Applied Arts
- Occupations: Painter; iconographer
- Awards: People's Artist of Ukraine; Merited Figure of Arts of Ukraine

Roman Vasylyk (Ukrainian: Роман Якимович Василик; born 8 October 1947) is a Ukrainian painter, iconographer, and professor. He has been awarded the honorary title of People's Artist of Ukraine. He is founder of the Department of Sacral Art of the Lviv National Academy of Arts, its first head and author of the concept of its activities. He is the younger brother of Bishop Pavlo Vasylyk of the Ukrainian Catholic Eparchy of Kolomyia, a priest and bishop of the "catacomb church". He is a co-founder and chairman of the Ukrainian Union of Icon Painters and a member of the Commission on Sacred Art at the Ukrainian Catholic Archeparchy of Lviv.

== Biography ==
He was born on 8 October 1947 in Barysh (now Buchach Hromada, Chortkiv Raion, Ternopil Oblast, Ukraine).

He graduated from Buchach Art School, Uzhhorod School of Applied Arts (1968), Lviv Institute of Decorative and Applied Arts (1973, teachers of the specialty Karlo Zvirynskyi and Volodymyr Ovsiichuk). Vasylyk was the chief artist of the Our Lady of the Gate of Dawn church in Lviv. From 1988, Dean, from 2001, Professor of the Lviv Institute of Decorative and Applied Arts (now the Lviv National Academy of Arts). In 1995, he founded the Department of Sacral Art of the Lviv National Academy of Arts, which he headed until July 2020.

He painted the iconostasis and the altar icon in the chapel of the memorial complex-museum of Cardinal and Patriarch Josyf Slipyj of the UGCC in Zazdrist.

The works were exhibited at the Andrei Sheptytskyi National Museum of Lviv.

== Awards ==
- Merited Figure of Arts of Ukraine (21 January 2002)
- People's Artist of Ukraine (23 April 2008).

== Bibliography ==
- Vasylyk Roman Yakymovych / V. P. Badiak // Encyclopedia of Modern Ukraine [Online] / Eds. : I. М. Dziuba, A. I. Zhukovsky, M. H. Zhelezniak [et al.] ; National Academy of Sciences of Ukraine, Shevchenko Scientific Society. – Kyiv : The NASU institute of Encyclopedic Research, 2005.
- (in Ukrainian) Бадяк В. (ЕСУ), Василик Роман Якимович // Ternopil Encyclopedic Dictionary: in 4 v. / editorial board: H. Yavorskyi and other, Ternopil: "Zbruch", 2004, V. 1: А—Й, S. 225. — ISBN 966-528-197-6.
- Ключковська І. Ірина Ключковська. Роман Василик. Шлях до ікони // День. — 2011. — 18 листопада.
- Брати Василики із Бариша - сподвижники української духовності [Текст] / М. Косів // Нова доба. — 2021. — № 33 (19 серп.). — С. 3 ; Сільський господар плюс Тернопільщина. — 2021. — № 48 (1 груд.). — С. 7.
