= Volodymyr Rybotytskyi =

Ukrainian painter (born 1942)

- Володимир Петрович Риботицький
- Born: 11 March 1942 (age 84); Laszki, Podkarpackie Voivodeship (now Poland)
- Education: Lviv Ivan Trush School of Applied Arts, Lviv Institute of Applied and Decorative Arts
- Occupation: Painter

Volodymyr Rybotytskyi (Ukrainian: Володимир Петрович Риботицький; born 11 March 1942) is a Ukrainian painter. Member of the Union of Artists of Ukraine from 1985. He was a deputy of the Lviv Oblast Council in 1990. He is a laureate of the Ivan Trush Prize (2011) and one of the representatives of the Lviv School of Painting. Husband of Oksana Rybotytska.

== Biography ==
Volodymyr Rybotytskyi was born on 11 March 1942, in Laszki, now part of the Gmina Laszki, Jarosław County, Podkarpackie Voivodeship, Poland.

During Operation Vistula, he was deported to Lviv, where he graduated from the Ivan Trush School of Applied Arts (1962) and the Institute of Applied and Decorative Arts (1970). His teachers were Roman Selskyi, Karlo Zvirynskyi, and Danylo Dovboshynskyi. He worked as a painting instructor at the Lviv Institute of Applied and Decorative Arts (1971–1976), deputy director (1976–1989), and director (1989–1999) of the Lviv Oleksa Novakivskyi Children's Art School, and as a painting instructor at the Lviv College of Decorative and Applied Arts (2009–2018).

From 1999 to 2009, he lived in the USA.

== Creativity ==
From 1991, he has participated in all-Ukrainian and international art exhibitions in the US, Czechia, Slovakia, Poland, Hungary, Belgium, and Italy. His solo exhibitions have been held in Lviv (1992, 1997, 2011, 2017; 2022, a joint exhibition with his wife Oksana), New Hope (2002), Bedminster (2003), Lambertville (2004), and Philadelphia (2006; all in the USA). Some of his works are held in the collections of the Khmelnytskyi Regional Art Museum. His students include Volodymyr Bohuslavskyi and Volodymyr Marchuk.

His main works are "Kozak Mamai" (1969), "Zymovyi Lviv", "Bilia Kosova" (both 1980), "Hutsulska para" (1988), "Ptakh v tenetakh" (1989), "Trypilski krasuni" (1997), "Karpaty", "Kvity Mimii" (both 1998), "Labirynt-1", "Labirynt-2", "Zakhid sontsia", "Ryba" (all 2005), "Pobut ariiv", "Aleia" (both 2006), "Osin", "Zapusk povitrianykh zmiiv", "Artsalon", "Nyva" (all 2007), "Vesna" (2011), and "Verby" (2016).

== Awards ==
- Ivan Trush Prize (2011) for his solo exhibition presented at the Andrey Sheptytsky National Museum of Lviv.
- Diploma of the International Biennale "Impreza" (1997, Ivano-Frankivsk).
- Diploma of the International Exhibition "Lviv Autumn Salon 'Vysokyi Zamok'" (1998).

== Honoring ==
On 25 April 2024, a documentary film titled "Volodymyr and Oksana Rybotytskyi: Synergy of Creativity" was presented in Lviv.

== Bibliography ==
- Rybotytskyi Volodymyr Petrovych / L. V. Voloshyn // Encyclopedia of Modern Ukraine [Online] / Eds. : I. М. Dziuba, A. I. Zhukovsky, M. H. Zhelezniak [et al.] ; National Academy of Sciences of Ukraine, Shevchenko Scientific Society. – Kyiv : The NASU institute of Encyclopedic Research, 2024.
