= Yakov Epshtein (Israeli sculptor) =

Israeli sculptor and monumentalist

- יעקב אפשטיין
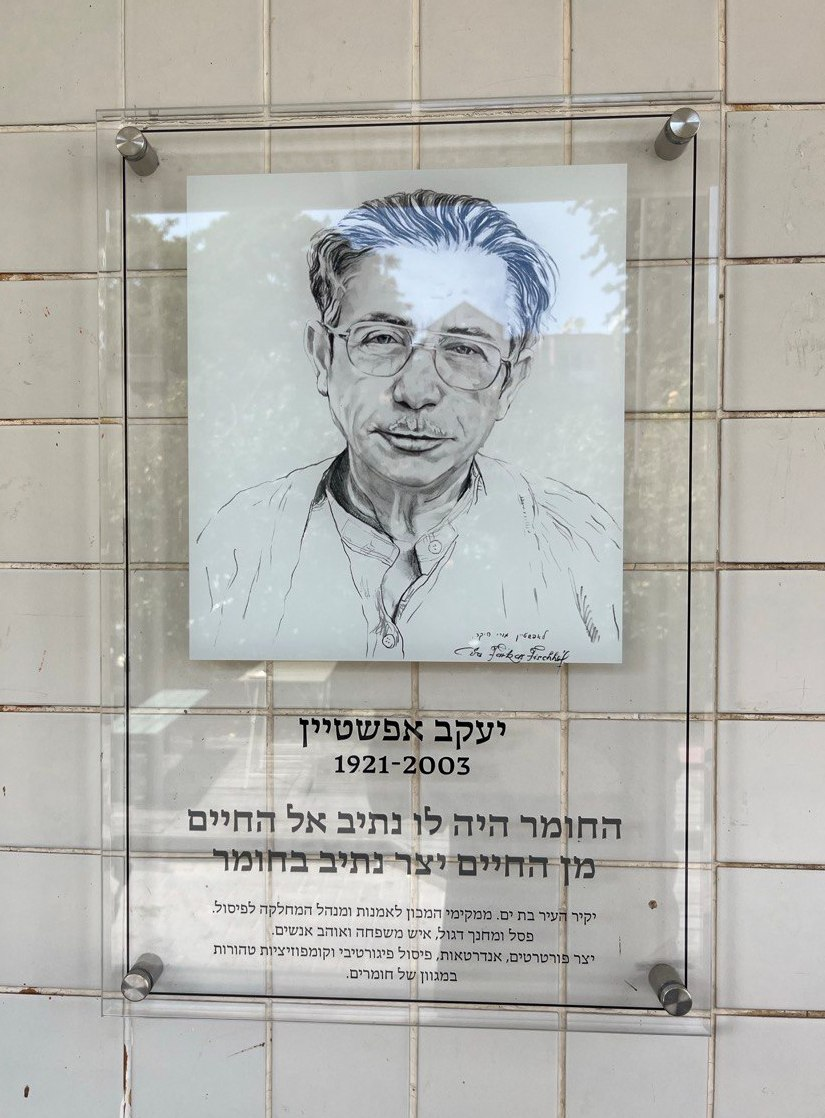
- A memorial plaque to sculptor Yakov Epshtein at the entrance to the Bat Yam Institute of Art
- Born: 1921; Kremnica
- Died: 1 December 2003 (aged 81–82); Tel Aviv, Israel
- Education: Lviv National Academy of Arts
- Known for: Sculpture, Monumental art, Painting
- Awards: Yad Vashem Prize, Bat Yam Art Prize, Honorary Citizen of Bat Yam

Yakov Epshtein (1921–2003) was an Israeli sculptor, monumentalist, and educator. He is considered one of the founders of modern Israeli monumental art and was named an Honorary Citizen of Bat Yam.

== Biography ==
Epshtain was born in 1921 in Kremnica, into a family of a sculptor and woodcarver, Nachman Epshtein. In 1935, he moved to Lviv and enrolled at the Lviv National Academy of Arts, graduating in 1941. During World War II, he served as a telephone operator in the Soviet Army (1941–1946).

From 1946 to 1957, he lived in Lviv, teaching at the academy and participating in the restoration of Renaissance and Baroque architecture in Ukraine and Russia. Among his works were reliefs for the Maykop Cadet School, a memorial near Stalingrad, and a sculptural portrait of Ukrainian poet Taras Shevchenko (copies are held in Ukraine, Canada, and the US).

In 1957–1959, Epshtein lived in Poland and was a member of the Union of Polish Artists. He received a cultural grant from the Ministry of Culture. His portrait of Sholem Aleichem is held at the Israeli Embassy in Warsaw, with a replica in the Jewish Cultural Center in Wrocław.

In 1959, Epshtein immigrated to Israel with his wife and two daughters, settling in Bat Yam. He was one of the founders of the Bat Yam Institute of Art (1960) and led its sculpture department. Among his students were sculptors Sarah Katz, Zahara Rubin, Talia Tokatly, and Yael Shalev. He also taught at the Thelma Yellin School of Arts, Bezalel Academy, and Avni Institute in Tel Aviv.

He became a member of the Israel Association of Painters and Sculptors in 1960. His works are in the Mishkan Museum of Art, Tel Aviv University, Ben-Gurion University, Bat Yam Auditorium, Holon Municipal Museum, Beit Yatziv, and hospitals such as Sharon and Wolfson.

His sculptures are part of the permanent collection of the David Ben-Ari Museum of Contemporary Art in Bat Yam.

Epshtein died in 2003. He is survived by his daughters Rachel and Bella. In June 2025, the Bat Yam Institute of Art was named in his honor.

== Notable works ==
- Memorial to Janusz Korczak and his Pupils: A realist-constructionist group sculpture, located in the courtyard of the Bat Yam municipal library "Tarbutek". Epshtain received a Yad Vashem award for this work.
- Memorial to the Fallen of Hof HaCarmel: Commissioned after the 1967 war, opened in 1972. The monument consists of 12 seven-meter concrete columns symbolizing the fallen. It includes the names of 98 soldiers and biblical inscriptions from Isaiah and II Samuel.
- Portrait of Ilan Roeh: A bust of Israeli journalist Ilan Roeh, killed during a mission in Lebanon in 1999. Installed at Beit Sokolov garden, Tel Aviv.
- Relief at Or Shalom Center: A natural stone relief featuring stylized faces, designed in the 1960s for the Bat Yam Institute of Art.
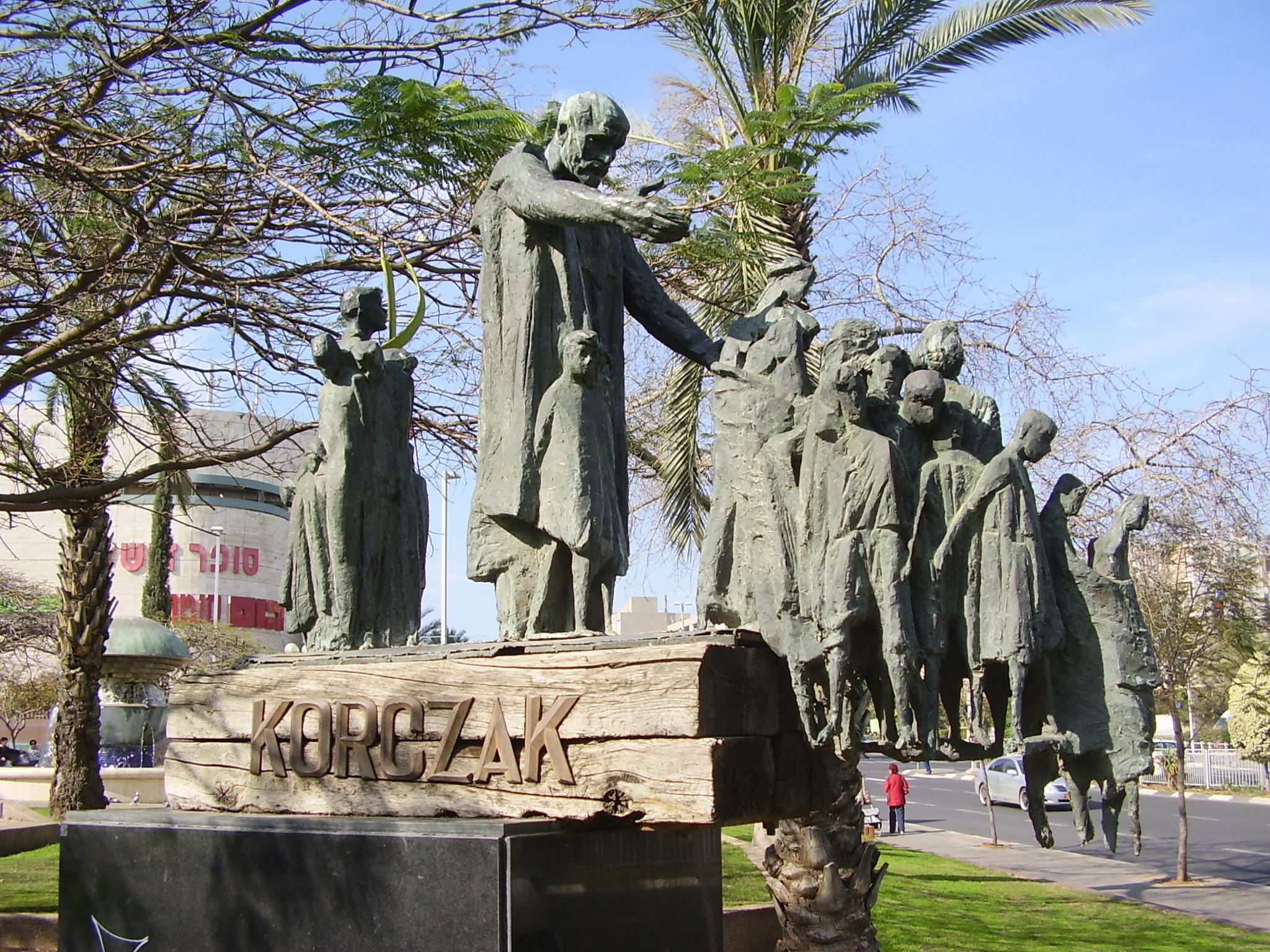
Memorial to Janusz Korczak and His Pupils (Bat Yam)

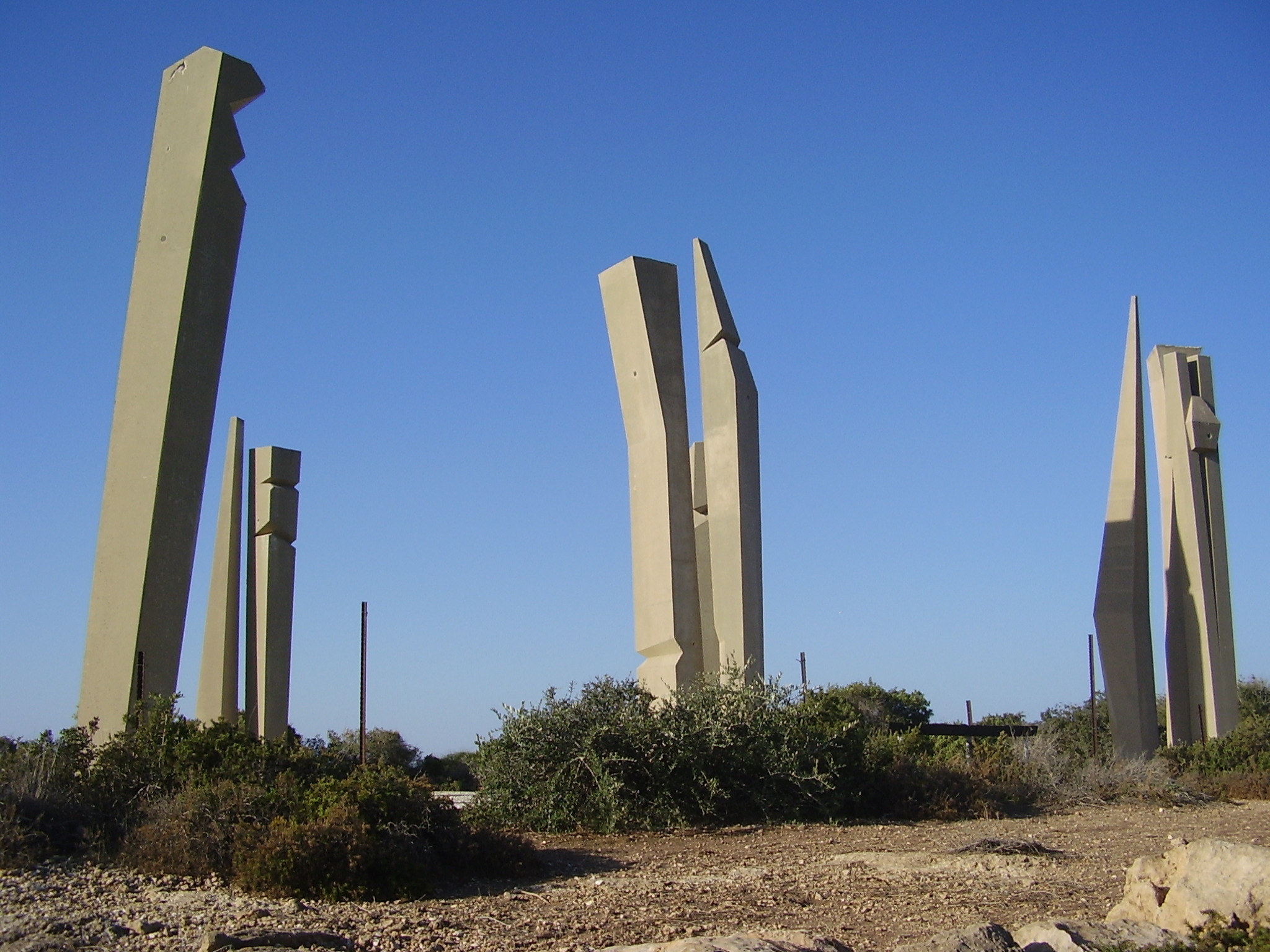
Memorial to the Fallen of Hof HaCarmel

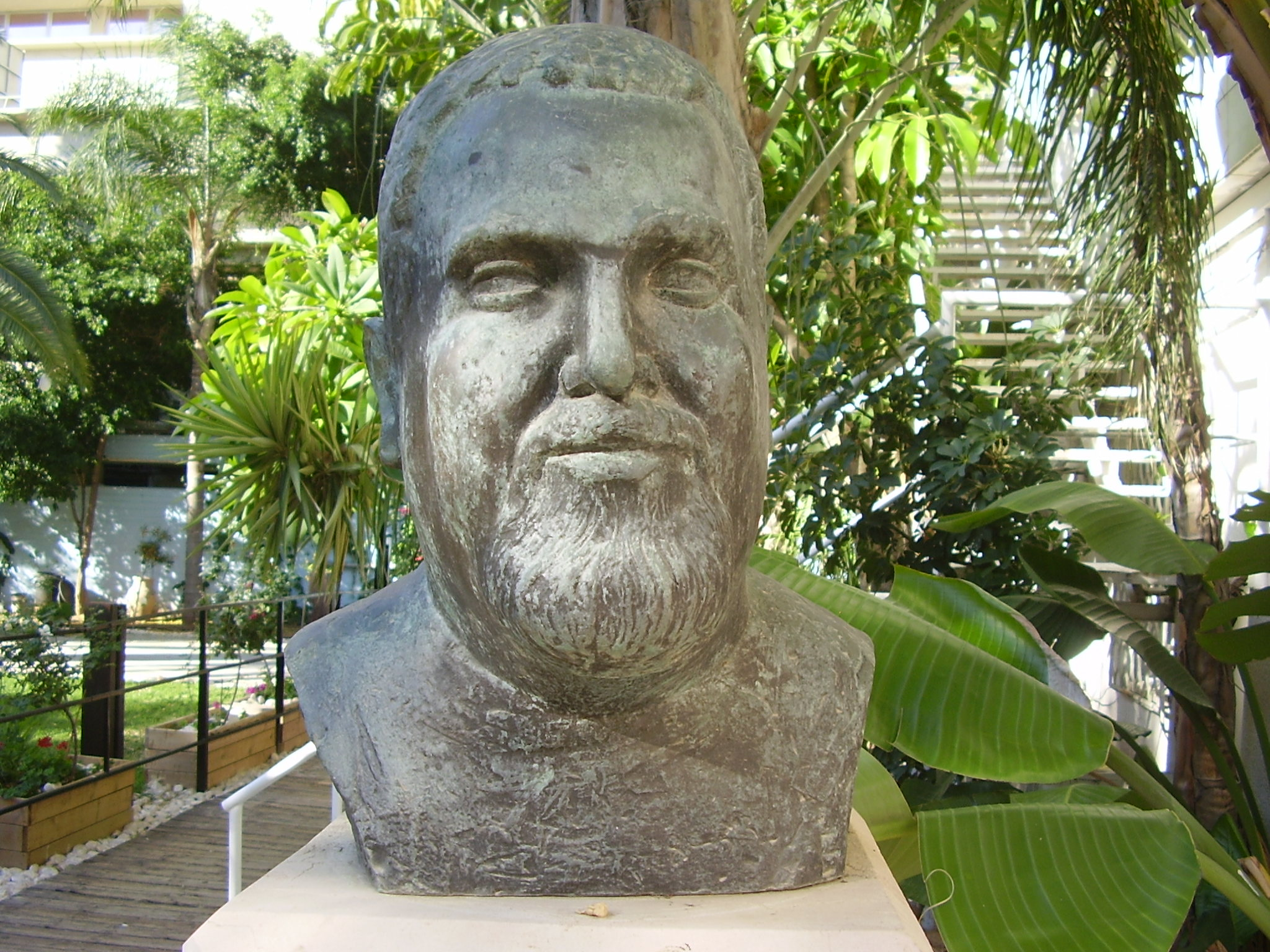
A bust of journalist Ilan Roeh (Tel Aviv)

== Selected exhibitions ==
- 1979 — "Artists Choose Artists," Tel Aviv Museum of Art
- 1980 — "27 Sculptors," Yad LaBanim, Tel Aviv
- 1984 — "80 Years of Sculpture in Israel," Israel Museum, Jerusalem
- 1984 — "25 Years of Bat Yam Institute of Art," Municipal Museum
- 1986–2003 — Solo exhibitions in Tel Aviv, Holon, Ashdod, Herzliya, and Bat Yam
- 2009 — "Craft Room," Bat Yam Museum of Contemporary Art

== Legacy ==
In June 2025, the Bat Yam Institute of Arts was named after the sculptor Yakov Epshtein.

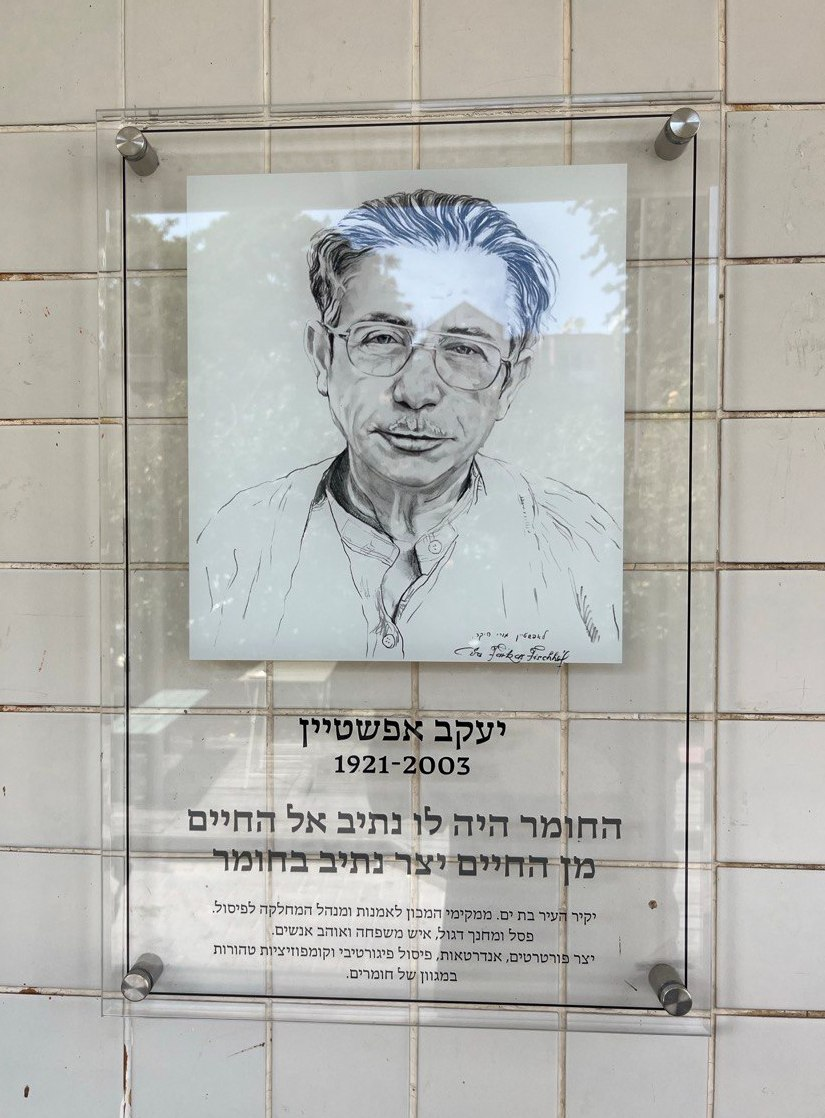
Commemorative plaque of the sculptor Yakov Epshtein at the entrance to the Bat Yam Institute of Arts

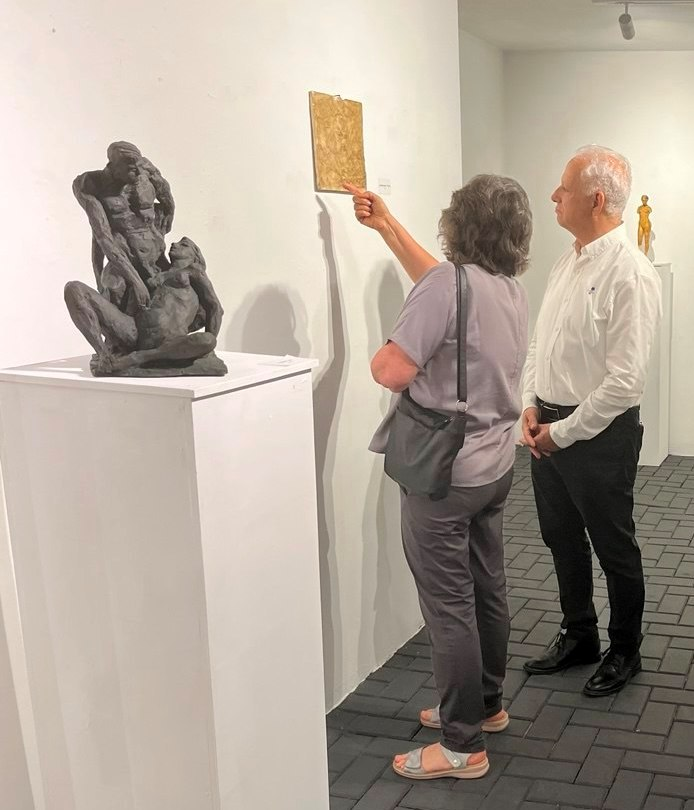
At the exhibition of Yakov Epshtein’s works at the Bat Yam Institute of Arts on the day it was named after him
