= Liudmyla Zhogol =

Ukrainian decorative textile artist

Liudmyla Yevhenivna Zhogol (23 May 1930 – 15 April 2015) was a Ukrainian decorative textile artist and one of the founders of the National Tapestry School of Ukraine in the second half of the 20th century. Candidate of Art History (1965), People's Artist of Ukraine (1994), Academician of the National Academy of Fine Arts and Architecture (2000).

== Early life and education ==
Liudmyla Zhogol was born on 23 May 1930 in Kyiv. She studied art at the Lviv Institute of Decorative Arts. Her teachers were Yosyp Bokshay, Vitold Monastyrsky, Roman Selsky, and others.

== Career ==
In the 1980s, Zhogol became the chairman of the Union of Artists of the USSR. The position allowed her to travel to Western Europe and the world. Zhogol visited France, Italy, Norway, Lebanon, Egypt, Cuba, Sweden, and Denmark.

For several years Zhogol was a teacher and headed the ceramics department at the Academy of Architecture. Later, she ran the Department of Art Textiles and Costume Modeling at the Mykhailo Boychuk Kyiv State Academy of Decorative Applied Arts and Design.

From 1978 to 2011, twenty-three personal exhibitions of the artist took place.

The most important contribution of Zhogol to the development of Ukrainian art in the second half of the XX - early XXI century is a system of synthetic interaction of architectural interior and artistic fabric developed by her. Zhogol worked as a theorist of fine and decorative arts. Zhogol is the author of books and more than 100 articles on the synthesis of the arts.

== Art ==
Zhogol created a sketch for each future tapestry. Then she made cardboard in the size of the future work. The master's works were made by hand at the Reshetylivka Art Factory. The central theme of the artist's works was floral tapestries. Zhogol worked in the liquid technique of tapestries - Montfleur.

Zhogol's works decorate the interiors of the Cabinet of Ministers of Ukraine, the Accounting Chamber, the Kyiv City Council, the Embassies of Ukraine in Greece, Austria, Brazil, the Kyiv Cinema House, hotels Kyiv, Rus, Dnipro, other official and public institutions and stored in many museums in Ukraine and other countries, such as Italy, France, and Norway. Zhogol’s works are exhibited at exhibitions of contemporary Ukrainian art.

National Folk Decorative Art Museum houses the largest and most important collection (over 100 items) of works by Lyudmila Zhogol.

== Personal life ==
Liudmyla Zhogol had a son who was an architect and died in a car accident in 2014.

== Selected works ==
=== Tapestries ===
- How can you not love such a land (from the Chernobyl series).
- Bitter color of wormwood (from the Chernobyl series).
- And there will be life (from the Chernobyl series).
- My flower is a thistle.
- The last time I flew up, my wings were damaged by that Chernobyl.
- Dedication of Bilokur.
- Eternal Fire.

=== Publications ===
- Interior fabrics (1968)
- Decorative art in the interior of the housing (1973)
- Decorative art in the interiors of public buildings (Moscow, 1978)
- Decorative art in the interior (Moscow, 1986)
- Decorative and Applied Art of the Ukrainian SSR ”(co-authored, 1986)

== Awards and honors ==
- Order of Princess Olga, II degree. (April 11, 2012) - for significant personal contribution to the development of national culture, preservation of the cultural and artistic heritage of the Ukrainian people, and many years of hard work.
- Order of Princess Olga, III degree. (July 11, 2000) - for significant personal contribution to the development and preservation of the cultural and artistic heritage of the Ukrainian people, high professionalism.
- People's Artist of Ukraine (April 29, 1994) - for significant personal contribution to developing Ukrainian fine arts and high professionalism.
- Winner of the All-Ukrainian Prize "Woman of the Third Millennium" in the nomination "Significant Figure" (2006).
- Laureate of the Kateryna Bilokur Prize (2007).
