= Faina Petryakova =

Faina Petryakova, aged 23. Personal archives from the Memorial Museum.

Faina Serhiivna Petryakova (Ukrainian: Фаїна Сергіївна Петрякова; 23 September 1931 — 6 May 2002) was a distinguished professor of the Lviv Academy of Arts, a recognized figure in the field of ethnography in Ukraine and beyond, and a senior researcher of the Institute of Ethnography at the Lviv branch office of the National Academy of Sciences of Ukraine.

In 1987 Petryakova authored an introductory article for the program of a ceramics exhibition organized by the Lviv Arts Gallery.

Petryakova authored a brochure dedicated to Lviv art critic and Judaica collector Maksymilian Goldstein (1880–1942), who perished along with his family during the Holocaust.

== Legacy ==
Petryakova died in 2002, leaving behind a vast scientific legacy in the field of Ukrainian glass, porcelain, ceramics and Ukrainian Judaica. She has been commemorated by The Faina Petryakova Scientific Center for Judaica and Jewish Art. The center has a collection of Judaica objects and pieces of traditional Ukrainian glass artwork.
