= Malyi Sknyt =

Rural locality in Khmelnytskyi Oblast, Ukraine

Malyi Sknyt Малий Скнит
- Location in Khmelnytskyi Oblast Malyi Sknyt (Ukraine)
- Coordinates: 50°28′22″N 26°55′58″E
- Country: Ukraine
- Oblast: Khmelnytskyi Oblast
- Raion: Shepetivka Raion
- Hromada: Hannopil rural hromada
- Time zone: UTC+2 (EET)
  - Summer (DST): UTC+3 (EEST)
- Postal code: 30020

Malyi Sknyt (Ukrainian: Малий Скнит) is a village in the Hannopil rural hromada of the Shepetivka Raion of Khmelnytskyi Oblast in Ukraine.

== History ==
A Trypillian settlement was discovered near the village.

On 19 July 2020, as a result of the administrative-territorial reform and liquidation of the Slavuta Raion, the village became part of the Shepetivka Raion.

== Notable residents ==
- Volodymyr Ovsiichuk (1924–2016), Ukrainian art historian, painter and educator
