= Barysh, Ternopil Oblast =

Barysh Бариш
- Location in Ternopil Oblast
- Coordinates: 49°02′18″N 25°16′06″E
- Country: Ukraine
- Oblast: Ternopil Oblast
- Raion: Chortkiv Raion
- Hromada: Buchach Hromada

Population (2014)
  - Total: 2,257
- Time zone: UTC+2 (EET)
  - Summer (DST): UTC+3 (EEST)
- Postal code: 48424

Barysh (Ukrainian: Бариш, Polish: Barysz) is a village in Ukraine, Ternopil Oblast, Chortkiv Raion, Buchach urban hromada.

== History ==
The first written mention is from 1393.

Since 11 December 2020, he has been a member of the Buchach urban hromada.

== Religion ==
- Church of the Ascension (1864, OCU, brick)
- Church of the Ascension (1864, UGCC, brick, formerly the Holy Trinity church, 1800–1864)
- Church of the Dormition (wooden, lost)
- Saint Michael church (wooden, lost)

== Notable residents ==
- Roman Vasylyk (born 1947), Ukrainian painter, iconographer
