= Church of the Ascension, Barysh (UGCC) =

Greek Catholic church in Barysh, Ukraine

Church of the Ascension Церква Вознесіння Господнього
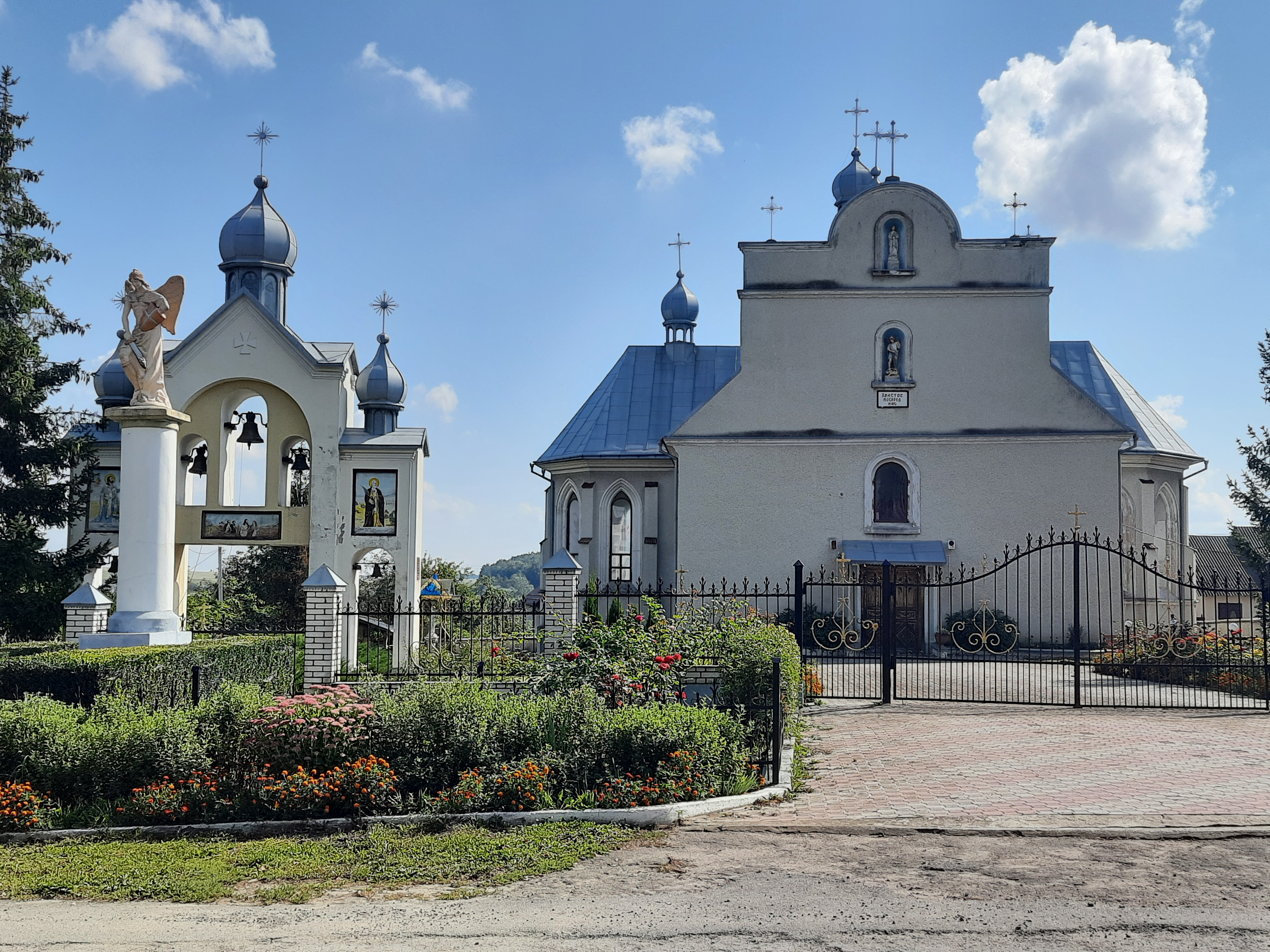

- Location within Ternopil Oblast

Religion
- Affiliation: Ukrainian Greek Catholic Church

Location
- Location: Barysh, Buchach urban hromada, Chortkiv Raion, Ternopil Oblast, Ukraine
- Interactive map of Church of the Ascension; Церква Вознесіння Господнього
- Coordinates: 49°02′32″N 25°16′17″E

Architecture
- Completed: 1882

Church of the Ascension (Ukrainian: Церква Вознесіння Господнього) is a Greek Catholic parish church (UGCC) in Barysh of the Buchach urban hromada of the Chortkiv Raion of the Ternopil Oblast, and an architectural monument of local importance.

== History ==
Until 1946, the parish and the church belonged to the UGCC. In 1946–1989 they belonged to the Russian Orthodox Church.

In 1990, the village community was divided into the faithful of the UAOC and the UGCC. The church remained with the vast majority of the UAOC parishioners. The church, where Greek Catholics now worship, used to be a Roman Catholic church built in 1800–1882 (founders – Kajetan Potocki and Marcin Szawlowski; rebuilt in 1900–1906).

In 1991, the Greek Catholics restored the Church of the Holy Trinity and have been holding services there ever since.

The parish has the Mothers in Prayer community, the Pope's Worldwide Prayer Network, and the Marian and Altar Guards.

== Priests ==
- at. Petrash,
- at. Pavlo Vasylyk,
- at. Petro Lehkyi,
- at. Petro Prybula,
- at. Ihor Dovhaniuk (since 2008, administrator).
