= Church of the Ascension, Barysh (OCU) =

Ukrainian Orthodox church in Barysh, Ukraine

Church of the Ascension Церква Вознесіння Господнього
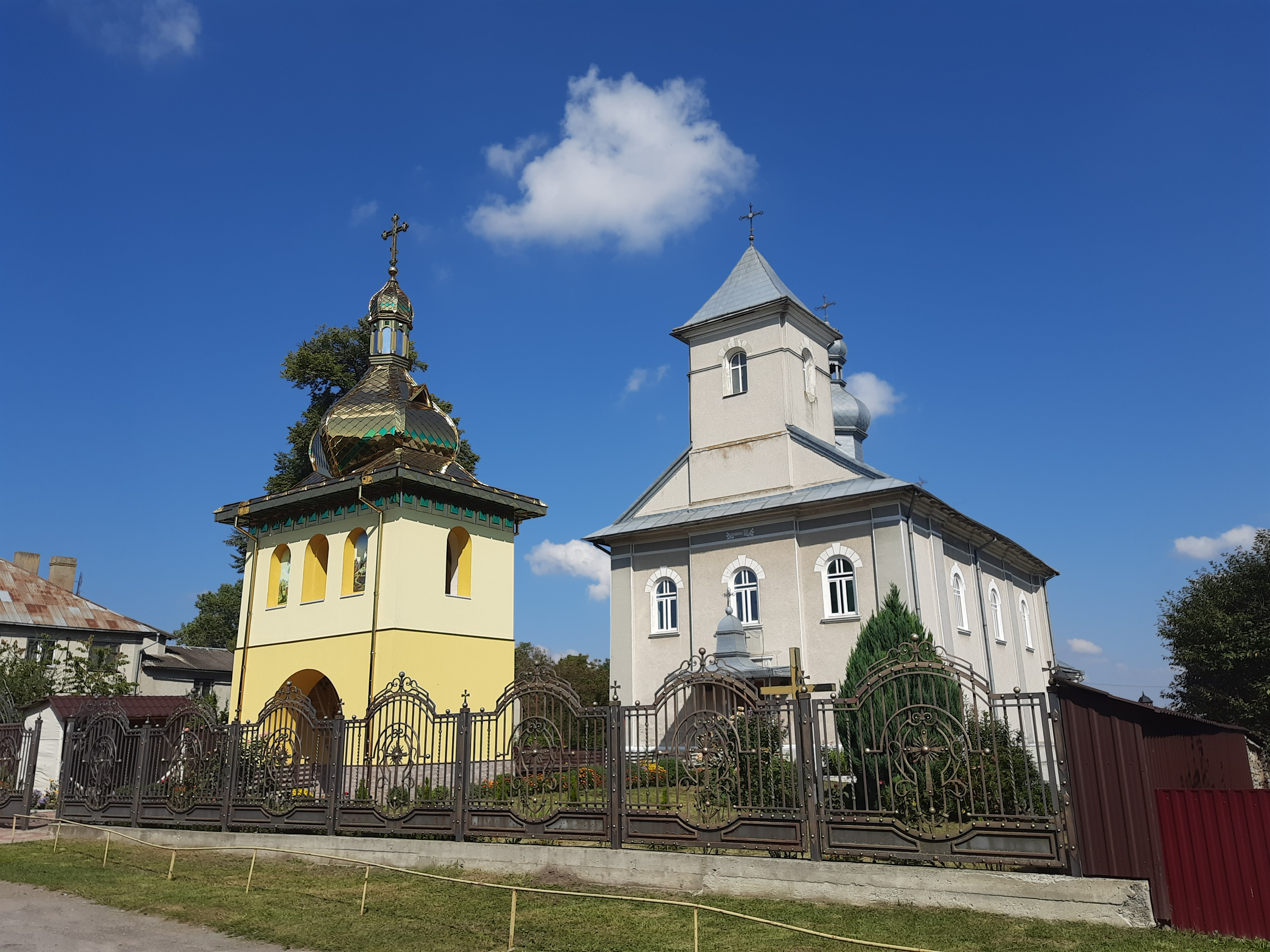

- Location within Ternopil Oblast

Religion
- Affiliation: Orthodox Church of Ukraine
- Ecclesiastical or organisational status: Active
- Status: Church

Location
- Location: Barysh, Buchach urban hromada, Chortkiv Raion, Ternopil Oblast, Ukraine
- Coordinates: 49°02′36″N 25°16′10″E

Architecture
- Type: Church
- Groundbreaking: 1860 (brick church)
- Completed: 1864

The Church of the Ascension (Ukrainian: Церква Вознесіння Господнього) is an Orthodox parish church (OCU) in Barysh of the Buchach urban hromada of the Chortkiv Raion of the Ternopil Oblast.

== History ==
The first mention of the wooden church dates back to 1708.

In 1732–1733, the general visitation of the parish was carried out by at. Makarii Neronovych and at. Antonii Sidlevych. At that time, the church and parish belonged to the Podil Deanery of the Lviv Eparchy of the UGCC. The act of visitation states that in 1733 the parish of Barysh had images of the Passion of the Lord and the Last Judgment or one of them.

As of 1733–1734, the Belz voivode Teresa Potocka gave the present to the church.

On 24 April 1761, the church was visited by at. Mykola Shchadurskyi.

Metrics from 1786 have been preserved.

The parish was subordinated to the Monastyryska (1832–1842) and Buchach (1843–1885) deaneries of the UGCC. In 1885, it was transferred to the newly created Stanyslaviv Eparchy of the UGCC.

In 1860–1864, the construction of a brick church continued.

In 1990–2018 it belonged to the UAOC, and since 2018 it has been part of the OCU.

On 6 June 2019, Archbishop Tykhon of Ternopil and Buchach visited the parish.

Number of believers: In 1832 – 780 people, 1844 – 887, 1854 – 1001, 1864 – 1063, 1874 – 1090, 1884 – 1048, 1886 – 1108, 1896 – 1284, 1906 – 1500, 1914 – 1683, 1925 – 1700, 1938 – 1250.

== Priests ==
- at. Stefan Skorobahatyi (1733–1734)
- at. Ivan Vynnytskyi (~ 1832)
- at. Kostiantyn Horynovych (~ 1836, administrator)
- at. unknown (~ 1838)
- at. Yosyf Zderkovskyi (1838–1842)
- at. Ferdynand Medvetskyi (1842–1843)
- at. Onufrii Vantsytskyi (1843–1884)
- at. Roman Liander (staff member)
- at. Petro Kotsovskyi (~1886)
- at. Teodor Melenevych (1886–1887, administrator)
- at. Ivan Zafiiovskyi (~1887–1900)
- at. Ivan Pisetskyi (1900–1901)
- at. Vasyl Kozlovskyi (~1901–1938)
- at. Ivan Kozub (1930–1931, staff)
- at. Mykhailo Bozak (~ 1933–1935)
- at. Antin Kovalskyi (~ 1937–1938)
- at. Petro Vysotskyi
- at. Ihor Tabachak

== Sources ==
- Бучач і Бучаччина. Історично-мемуарний збірник, ред. колегія Михайло Островерха та інші., Ню Йорк – Лондон – Париж – Сидней – Торонто : НТШ, Український архів, 1972, Т. XXVII, 944 s, іл.
- (in Ukrainian) Мельничук Б., Уніят В., Бариш // Ternopil Oblast. History of cities and villages: in 3 v. / Ternopil: "Terno-graph", 2014, V. 1: А—В, S. 593—594. — ISBN 978-966-457-228-3.
- (in Ukrainian) Труш Я., Уніят, В., Бариш // Ternopil Encyclopedic Dictionary: in 4 v. / editorial board: H. Yavorskyi and other, Ternopil: "Zbruch", 2004, V. 1: А—Й, S. 85. — ISBN 966-528-197-6.
- "Barysz". Geographical Dictionary of the Kingdom of Poland (in Polish). 1. Warszawa: Kasa im. Józefa Mianowskiego. 1880. p. 114.
