= Alexander Klevan =

Russian-born Israeli painter

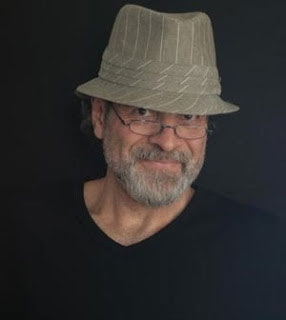
- Born: 12 October 1950; Siberia, Russia

Alexander Klevan is a Russian-born Israeli painter was born on 12 October 1950, USSR;( אלכסנדר קלבן). Since 1990 he lives in Israel.

Alexander Klevan studied at The Lviv National Academy of Arts, Ukraine 1974–79. His works exhibited in USSR as well as at international exhibitions in Israel, Norway, United States, UK, Canada.

Third-generation art gallery owner Menachem Safrai, who runs the Safrai Gallery in Jerusalem and also holds exhibitions outside of Israel, has exhibited his work. Exhibitions organized by Safrai Gallery between 1993 and 1995 include showings in Needham, Massachusetts; Providence, Rhode Island; Indianapolis, Indiana; Milwaukee, Wisconsin; Falls Church, Virginia; Framingham, Massachusetts; Skokie, Illinois; Rochester, New York; and Walnut Creek, California. Solo exhibitions of watercolors and oils in Jerusalem in 1995 (titled “Metamorphoses”) and Tel Aviv in 1996 (titled “Winter Mood”) were organized by the Safrai Gallery.

Klevan participated in the 1996 ArtExpo in New York, and exhibited in Waltut Creek in 2000, in El Paso in 2002, and at the Blackheath Gallery in London in 2002–2003. He had a show Old City Caesarea Gallery, Israel, in 2004–2007.

In 2004 he participated in a Safrai Gallery exhibition in Tucson. His show titled “Beauty Transformation” was presented in Beit Asia, Tel Aviv, in 2005. In 2006, he participated in the Israeli Art Fair at Temple Sinai of Sharon and had a solo show titled “Time Transformation” at the Opera Hadasha in Tel Aviv.

Klevan has created his own style and absorbed major influences, while holding to Israeli and Russian art traditions.
