= Tetiana Vytiahlovska =

Ukrainian artist (born 1964)

- Тетяна Володимирівна
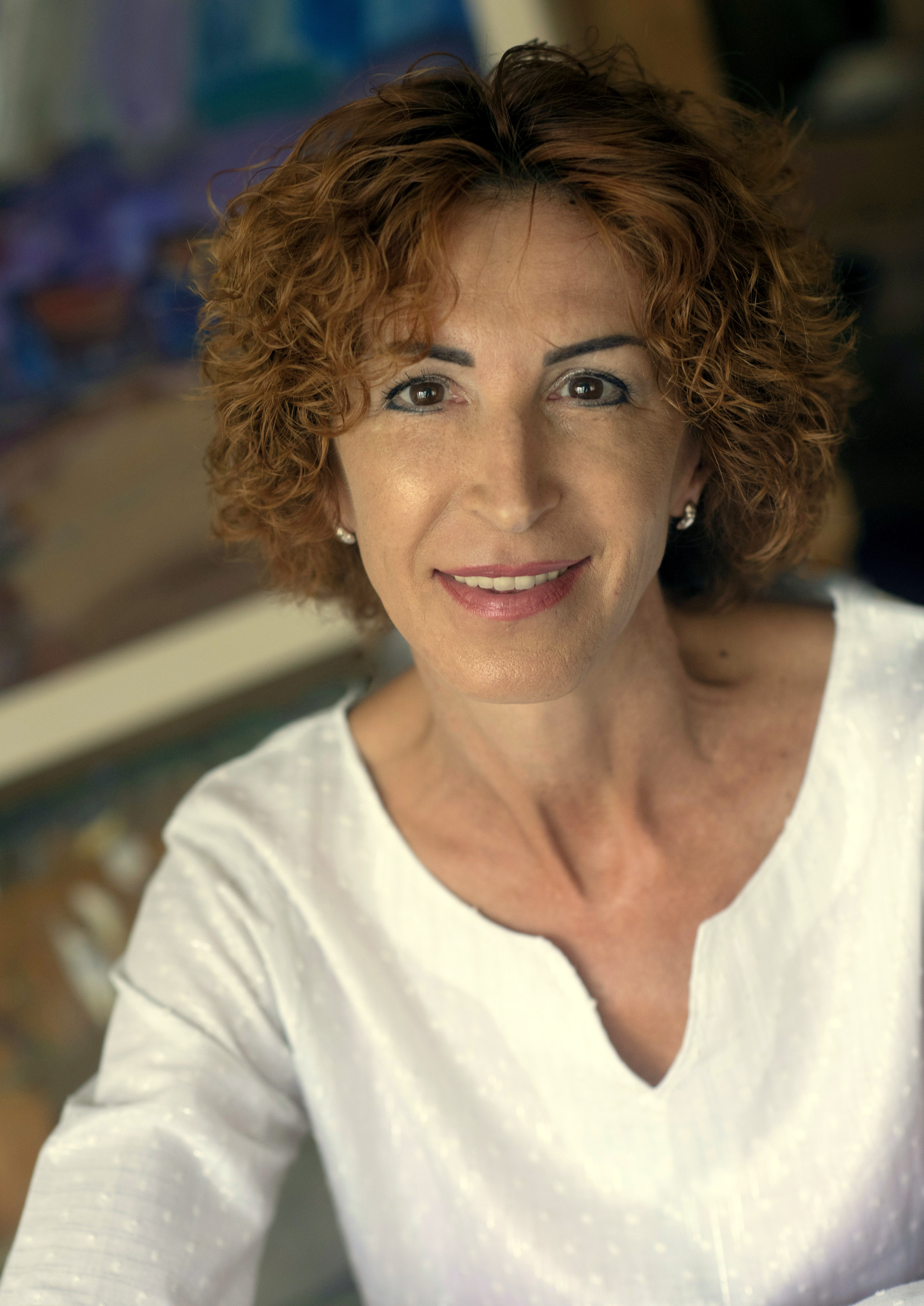
- Tetiana in 2019
- Born: Tetiana Volodymyrivna Vytiahlovska; 22 May 1964 (age 62); Buchach, Ternopil Oblast, Ukrainian SSR, Soviet Union (now Ukraine)
- Education: Lviv National Academy of Arts
- Occupation: Textile artist
- Honours: Honoured Artist of Ukraine
- Website: Official website

Tetiana Volodymyrivna Vytiahlovska (Ukrainian: Тетя́на Володи́мирівна Витягло́вська; born 22 May 1964) or simply known as Tetiana Vytiahlovska, is a Ukrainian textile artist and tapestry weaver who is known for her work in traditional weaving. Additionally, she is a member of the National Union of Artists of Ukraine and European Tapestry Forum.

== Early life and education ==
Tetiana was born in the Ukrainian city of Buchach, in the Ternopil Oblast, on 22 May 1964. She attended the Vyzhnytsia School of Applied and Decorative Arts' Department of Art Weaving (currently known as the Vasyl Shkribliak Vyzhnytsia College of Applied Arts), and later earned her degree in 1989 from the Lviv National Academy of Arts. Educator at the Zavodske art school since 1994.

== Artistry ==
Tetiana, as expressed in a 2021 interview, approaches her art with a fluid and unrestricted mindset towards colour schemes, finding joy in diversity and allowing her emotions to guide her choices. She observes a curious synchronicity between her attire and the hues of the tapestry she's working on, reflecting an unconscious harmony between her inner world and her creative expression. Preferring the tranquility of late-night hours, Tetiana immerses herself in her creative space, often accompanied by distant music playing softly in the background.

In her artistic endeavours, Tetiana uses a variety of elements such as colour, texture, composition, and lines to convey her interpretation of kindness, love, beauty, and the occasional harshness of reality. Through her work, she seeks to encapsulate the essence of everything beautiful that she perceives in the world, drawing inspiration from nature's intricate forms and vibrant colors.

Furthermore, Tetiana draws inspiration from timeless themes found in literature and culture, particularly emphasising the significance of human connections. She views these connections as a profound wellspring of inspiration, reflecting the depth and universality of human emotions and experiences. Through her art, Tetiana seeks to capture the essence of these connections, weaving them into the fabric of her creations and inviting viewers to contemplate the enduring beauty of human relationships.

== Works ==
Tetiana has been a participant since 1988 in international art shows. She took part in the 1999 Munich "Days of Culture of Ukraine in Germany" Exhibitions of my own work have been held in Ternopil (1995, 2000, 2016), Slavutych, Lviv (2004), Zbarazh (2008), Chicago (2017), and all of the cities in between. The museums of Ternopil, Kyiv, Slavutych, Lviv, Hamburg, US, and others house her works.

Tetiana's work is defined as both figurative and non-figurative at the 11th From Lausanne to Beijing International Fiber Art Biennale, which launched online in mid-January 2021. She draws inspiration from Ukrainian mythology, culture, and stories. Her primary creative focus is on weaving tapestries, although she also dabbles with batik, oil painting, and aquarelle.

== Personal life ==
Tetiana is married to Mykhailo Vytyakhlovskyi, a sculptor.

== Awards and honours ==
Tetiana has earned the following awards and honours:

- Honoured Artist of Ukraine (2018)
- Member of the National Union of Artists of Ukraine (1995)
- Diplomas of the Minister of Culture and Arts (2008, 2009, 2010, 2011, 2015, 2016, 2019, 2020, 2022)
- Award of the magazine "Світ дитини" at the international exhibition "Високий замок – 2006"
- Diploma in the nomination "For the expressiveness of the language of textiles" at the 1st All-Ukrainian Textile Triennial (Kyiv, 2004)
- 1st prize at the international exhibition "Осінній салон "Високий замок" (2002)
- 2nd prize of a regional exhibition dedicated to the 400th anniversary of the Union of Brest (1995)
- Excellence Award at the 11th From Lausanne to Beijing International Fiber Art Biennale (2021)
