= Laszki, Podkarpackie Voivodeship =

Laszki
- Village
- Location within Poland
- Coordinates: 50°1′15″N 22°53′58″E
- Country: Poland
- Voivodeship: Subcarpathian
- County: Jarosław
- Gmina: Laszki
- Population: 1,827
- Website: http://www.laszki.itl.pl

Laszki [ˈlaʂkʲi] is a village in Jarosław County, Subcarpathian Voivodeship, in south-eastern Poland. It is the seat of the gmina (administrative district) called Gmina Laszki.

Ukrainian painter Volodymyr Rybotytskyi was born in this village.
