= Zavaliv Castle =

Castle in Zavaliv, Ternopil Oblast, Ukraine

- Завалівський замок
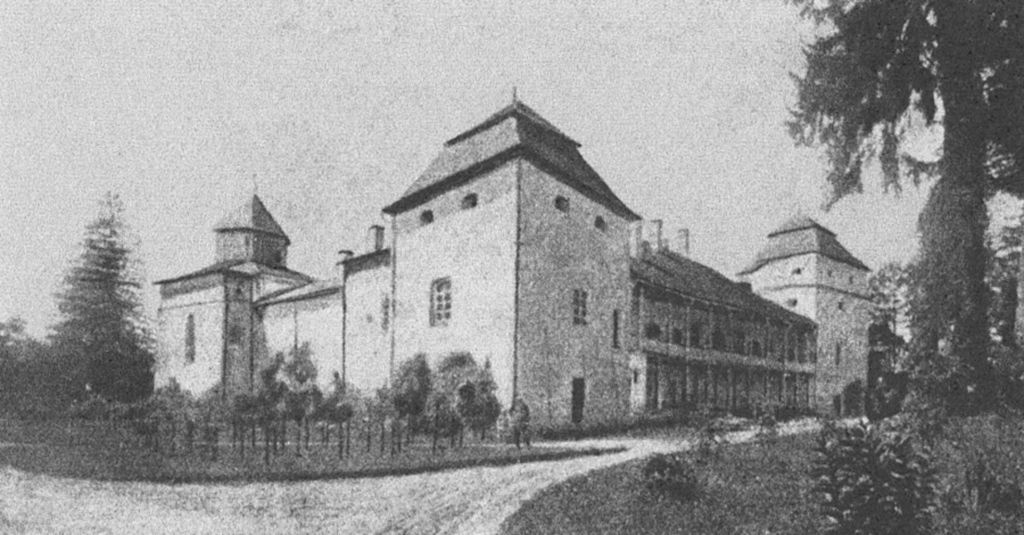
- Zavaliv Castle
- Interactive map of the Zavaliv Castle area

General information
- Location: Zavaliv, Ternopil Raion, Ternopil Oblast, Ukraine
- Coordinates: 49°12′21.4″N 25°02′31.9″E

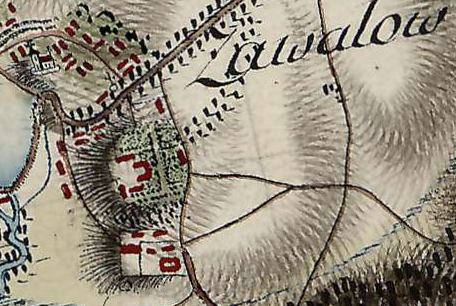
Zavaliv Castle on the map by Friedrich von Mieg, 18th century

The Zavaliv Castle (Ukrainian: Завалівський замок, romanized: Zavalivs'kyi zamok) is a defensive castle in Zavaliv, Ternopil Oblast. Castle built by the Makowiecki family in the early 17th century.

== History ==
In 1675, the castle was destroyed during the invasion of the Turkish vizier Ibrahim Szyszman, who took its owner Marek Makowiecki with his wife, children and a large post of nobles and people. The next owner Stanisław Jan Jabłonowski, Great Hetman of the Crown, rebuilt the destroyed castle and created a fortified post from which he kept watch over the Turks, who farmed in Podolia, often staying here. The Hetman's son and grandson equally often stayed in the castle, which was furnished in the lordly manner. Later, when the castle belonged to Aleksandr Raczyński, numerous mementos, works of art and a book collection were collected there. During World War I in 1915, the castle, which was on the main front line, was severely damaged, and the collections gathered there were looted. The renovated building was destroyed again in 1917, set on fire by retreating Russian troops.

== Architecture ==
The castle was girded by triple ramparts; it was one of the more beautiful and fortified castles of Red Ruthenia; in general outlines it was preserved until the end of the 19th century. It is inhabited, located on a considerable hill to the west (actually to the south) of the town. It presents a spacious, three-winged, one-story high edifice, built of stone and bricks in the shape of the letter "U". The north and southeast corners are enclosed by polygonal, slightly taller towers, well maintained and converted into apartments. A third similar tower, projecting forward, exists at the front of the northern wing, while the front of the southern wing is enclosed by a chapel, well-maintained but containing no memorabilia. An entrance vestibule with a staircase is located in the center of the main wing, longer than the side wings. Inside the castle are a number of smaller rooms and spacious halls. One of them was decorated until recently with paintings depicting the battles of Hetman Stanislaw Jabłonowski. They have now been destroyed. There are extensive cellars under the castle. The castle was once surrounded in a quadrangle by ramparts and ditches, of which only traces remain.
