= Zavaliv =

Rural locality in Ternopil Oblast, Ukraine

Coordinates: 49°12′10″N 25°01′53″E

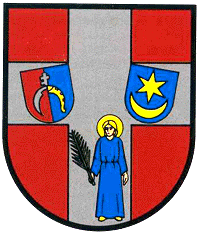
Old coat of arms of Zavaliv

Zavaliv (Ukrainian: Завалів) (formerly Polish: Zawałów) is a village (formerly a town) in the western part of Ternopil Raion (district) of Ternopil Oblast (province) of western Ukraine. The village is situated on the right bank of Zolota Lypa (stands for "Golden Lime Tree") river, 18 km away from the district center of Pidhaitsi. Zavaliv belongs to Pidhaitsi urban hromada, one of the hromadas of Ukraine.

Hamlet Kamiana Hora was united with the village. Due to the resettlement of people, hamlet Zamche was removed from the registration data.

- Population of Zavaliv is 472 people
- Founded in 1395
- Telephone code is +380 3542
- Postal code is 48023

== History ==
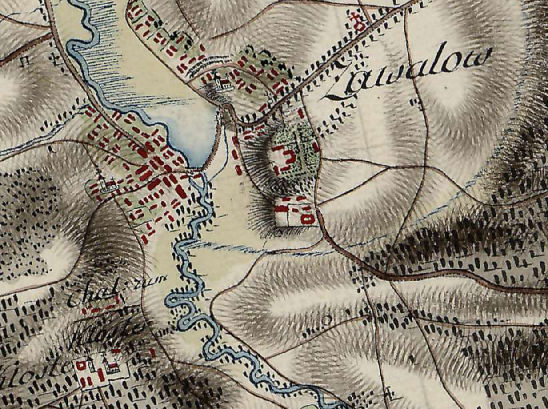
Zavaliv on the map dated back to XVIII century. Castle of Zavaliv and St. Nicholas monastery are clearly visible.

In 1725 Zavaliv was granted Magdeburg rights. In the second half of the 19th century, there were 191 houses and 1285 inhabitants (698 Ukrainian Greek-Catholics, 587 mainly Polish (some Ukrainian) Roman Catholics, 12 Germans, 17 Jews and a few Armenians) in the village. Zavaliv had a stone-built Polish Roman Catholic church and Ukrainian Greek-Catholic Church of Saint Nicholas the Wonderworker.

The history of intelligent, highly cultured family of Dmytro Huzar (1823–1908) is extremely interesting. He was the pastor of the village Zavaliv and now rests in peace on the village's cemetery, together with his beloved wife. Lubomyr Husar is his great-grandson. Dmytro Huzar arrived to Zavaliv in 1856. Served there in the parish until 1908. At the moment of arrival he already had two sons, Volodymyr and Yevhen. His son Lev (grandfather of Lubomyr Husar) and daughter Olha (in future - writer, translator, wife of Volodymyr Levytskyi) were born in Zavaliv. His Eminent Beatitude Lubomyr Husar visited Zavaliv and prayed for his relatives in the cemetery.

Ukrainian writer Ivan Franko visited the village during the Easter holiday of 1883 and a month later, he wrote an article about two remarkable icons of local St. Nicholas church.

Until 1990 Zavaliv belonged to Berezhany Raion. Until 18 July 2020, Zavaliv belonged to Pidhaitsi Raion. The raion was abolished in July 2020 as part of the administrative reform of Ukraine, which reduced the number of raions of Ternopil Oblast to three. The area of Pidhaitsi Raion was merged into Ternopil Raion.

== Notable residents ==
- Antin Manastyrskyi (1878–1969), Ukrainian folk artist, painter, and graphic artist
