= Antin Manastyrsky =

Ukrainian artist (1878–1969)

Antin Ivanovych Manastyrsky (Ukrainian: Антін Іванович Манастирський; November 2, 1878 – May 15, 1969) was a Ukrainian folk artist, painter, and graphic artist. He is the father of artist Vitold Manastyrsky.

== Biography ==
Manastyrsky was born in the village of Zavaliv, now Ternopil Raion of Ternopil Oblast (then part of the Austro-Hungarian Empire), in the family of a postal official. He graduated from the Lviv Art-Industrial School and later the Krakow Academy of Fine Arts.

In 1900, the Society for the Advancement of the Ruthenian Work, of which Manastyrsky was a member, staged an exhibition of his first paintings. From that time began his artistic career. He painted a variety of high-spiritual works: landscapes, contemporary reality, and satires.

Manastyrsky lived and worked in Lviv. He died on May 15, 1969, and was buried in a family tomb at the Lychakiv Cemetery.

== See also ==
- Liubov Voloshyn
