= Maksymilian Goldstein =

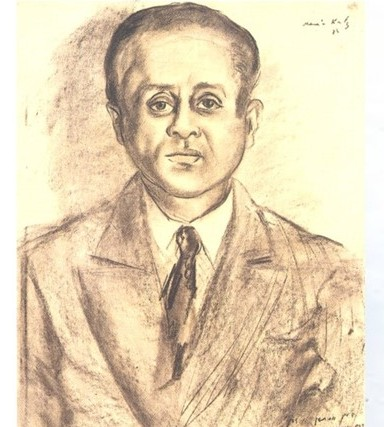
Portrait of Maximilian Goldstein, by Manet-Katz, 1932, made with charcoal pencil

Maksymilian Goldstein (December 9, 1880 – c. 1942; English: Maximilian Goldstein) was a Polish Jewish historian, art critic and collector. He owned a private museum featuring Eastern-European Jewish folk art and Judaica. He made great efforts to save the museum from the Nazis. Ultimately, the Nazis murdered him and his entire family.

== Biography ==
Goldstein was born in Lviv, Ukraine, at that time part of Poland, to Hersh (Herman) Goldstein, a tailor, and Elka Fradel (Eliza). His parents gave him the Hebrew/Yiddish name Mordechai, but his secular name was Maksymilian.

After World War I, Lviv became part of Ukraine and was under Soviet control, Goldstein was appointed director of the city's Jewish Museum at the end of the interwar era.

He curated a collection of art Judaica in his apartment at Nowy Świat 15, and conducted public tours of the collection. His serious collecting began in 1910, with the intention at that time of creating a museum.

In 1929, Goldstein began writing a book, Jewish Folk Culture and Art in Poland, with Karol Dresdner, documenting the extensive collection and especially a 1933 exhibit of the collection. It took six years to compile and was published in 1935.

By 1941, the Nazis, virulent antisemites, were in control of Poland, including Lviv by late June. Ukrainian locals, with tacit Nazi support, immediately conducted a series of pogroms in July. Goldstein recognized the danger to his Jewish-owned and Jewish-themed museum. He spoke with Ilarion Sventsitsky, Lviv's commissioner of museum affairs. Sventsitsky recommended him to the Museum of Art Crafts, which later became the Museum of Ethnography and Art Crafts. In July of that year, the museum agreed to become owner of the collection, keep it in the Goldstein apartment, and appoint Goldstein, his wife, and his younger daughter to the staff as curators of the collection.

However, by December, the Goldsteins were forced to move to the Jewish ghetto. In early 1942, the museum tried to prevent his deportation. In this period, Goldstein worked to secure Jewish object scattered about the city's synagogues.In September the museum obtained a certificate allowing him to freely move about the city, even outside the ghetto, to do this important collection work. In October 1942, he was sent to Janowska, a concentration camp near Lviv. He was executed in December.

== Personal life ==
In 1914, due to World War I, Goldstein left Lviv for Vienna. He was employeed at a credit institution for trade and industry. His fiancée, Nouseya Levenkron, went with him, and they married in Vienna the following March 1915.

They returned to Lviv in late summer 1917, just before the birth of their daughter Lilia. They later had another daughter, Irena.
