= Vitold Manastyrsky =

Vitold Antonovich Manastyrsky (Ukrainian: Вітольд Антінович Манастирський, January 11, 1915 – June 23, 1992) was a Soviet artist, painter, graphic artist, and teacher.

Manastyrsky was born in Lviv in the family of the Ukrainian artist Antin Manastyrsky. Vitold Antonovich received his initial artistic education at the Lviv Art School (1929–1934), and graduated from the Academy of Fine Arts in Warsaw (1935–1939).

Manastyrsky was a participant in many regional and international exhibitions. The artist taught drawing and painting at the Lviv Art-Industrial College (now the Ivan Trush Applied Arts College) and was an instructor at The Lviv National Academy of Arts since it opened. Manastyrsky died on June 23, 1992, and was buried in the Lychakiv cemetery.
