= Volodymyr Ovsiichuk =

Ukrainian art historian, painter and educator (1924–2016)

- Володимир Антонович Овсійчук
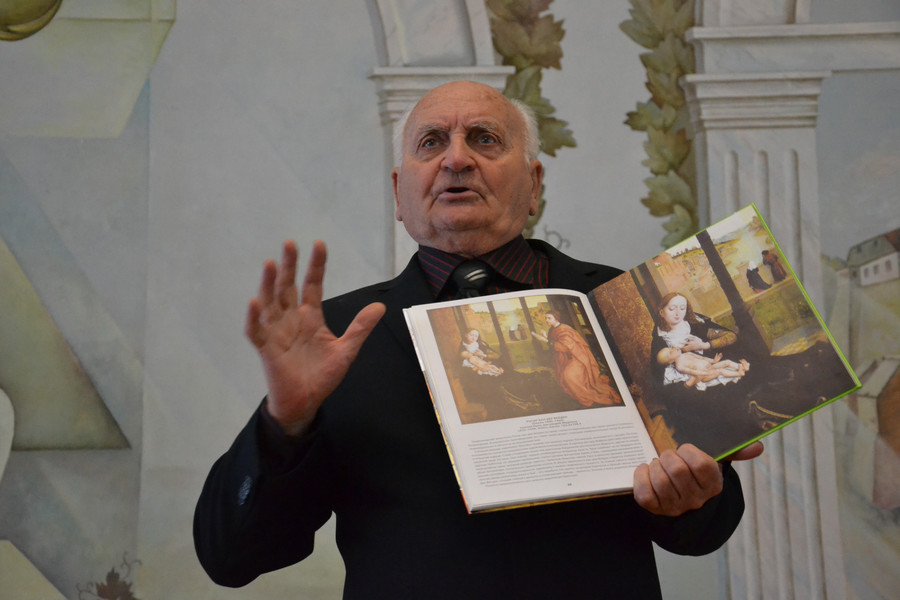
- Born: 28 July 1924; Malyi Sknyt, Khmelnytskyi Oblast (now Ukraine)
- Died: 26 July 2016 (aged 91); Lviv
- Education: University of Lviv
- Occupations: Art historian, painter and educator
- Awards: Merited Figure of Arts of Ukraine; Shevchenko National Prize; Order of Prince Yaroslav the Wise

Volodymyr Ovsiichuk (Ukrainian: Володимир Антонович Овсійчук; 28 July 1924 – 26 July 2016) was a Ukrainian art historian, painter and educator. He became a Doctor of Art History in 1990 and a professor in 2001. From 2000, he was a corresponding member of the National Academy of Arts of Ukraine, a full member of the Shevchenko Scientific Society from 1989, and a member of the National Union of Artists of Ukraine from 1972.

== Biography ==
Volodymyr Ovsiichuk was born on 28 July 1924, in Malyi Sknyt, now Hannopil Hromada, Shepetivka Raion, Khmelnytskyi Oblast, Ukraine.

He was a participant in World War II and graduated from University of Lviv in 1952.

From 1952 to 1979, he worked as the head of the Department of Western European Art at the Borys Voznytskyi Lviv National Art Gallery. From 1961 to 1963, he took part in the restoration of the Khan's Palace in Bakhchysarai, AR Crimea. In the 1960s-1980s, under the leadership of Borys Voznytskyi, he was active in scientific and search expeditions in Volyn.

In 1979, he began working at the Institute of Ethnology of the National Academy of Sciences of Ukraine (NANU) in Lviv, where he became head of the Department of Art History in 1991. Concurrently, from 1965, he was a lecturer and professor at the Lviv Academy of Arts.

He died on 26 July 2016, in Lviv.

== Works ==
His scholarly interests were in Ukrainian art of the 10th–20th centuries. He compiled the catalog "Lvivskyi portret XVI–XVIII st." (1967) and the albums "Lvivska kartynna halereia" (1977) and "Danylo Dovboshynskyi" (2004).

He was the author of portraits, landscapes, and still lifes. In 2015, the Academician Volodymyr Ovsiichuk Center for Art History was opened at the National University of Ostroh Academy, to which the artist donated 76 of his own works.

Among his important works:

- "Arkhitekturni pamiatky Lvova" (1969);
- "Obrazotvorche mystetstvo Yuhoslavii: Narys istorii" (1983);
- "Ukrainske mystetstvo XІV — pershoi polovyny XVII st." (1985);
- "Ukrainske mystetstvo druhoi polovyny ХVІ — pershoi polovyny ХVІІ st.: Humanistychni ta vyzvolni idei" (1985);
- "Maistry ukrainskoho barokko: Zhovkivskyi khudozhnii oseredok" (1991);
- "Maliari perekhidnoi doby (Rozdumy nad tvorchistiu khudozhnykiv lvivskoho Renesansu Fedora Senkovycha ta Mykoly Petrakhnovycha)" // Zapysky NTSh: Pratsi Sektsii mystetstvoznavstva. Vol. 227 (1994);
- "M. Moroz. Filadelfiia" (1994);
- "F. Humeniuk" (1995);
- "Ukrainske maliarstvo X–XVIIІ st.: Problemy koloru: Albom" (1996);
- "Oleksandr Novakivskyi: Albom" (1998);
- "Rozdum nad kartynoiu Tarasa Shevchenka «Kateryna»" // Narodoznavchi zoshyty. 1999. Part 5 (29);
- "Opovidi pro ikonu" (2000, co-author);
- "Klasytsyzm i romantyzm v ukrainskomu mystetstvi" (2001);
- "Ukrainske mystetstvo: Navchalnyi posibnyk: In 3 parts. Part 2" (2004).

Among his important paintings:

- "Khudozhnyk D. Paruta" (1960), "Pid osin. Moie selo" (1962), "Konstruktyvnyi natiurmort" (1964), "Zhnyva na horodakh" (1967), "Avtoportret" (1968), "Chervoni maky. Olesko" (1971), "Krainia khata po dorozi do Briukhovych" (1972), "Doshch nad Oleskom" (1974), "Krainia khata v seli" (1975), "Selo pid skeleiu" (1981), "Sukhi kvity", "Zhorzhyny" (both 1993), "Bili piony" (2001), "Kvity u synii vazi" (2002).

== Awards ==
- Merited Figure of Arts of Ukraine (1989);
- Shevchenko National Prize (1994);
- Ivan Franko Prize of the National Academy of Arts of Ukraine (2000);
- Gold Medal of the National Academy of Arts of Ukraine (2000);
- Order of Prince Yaroslav the Wise 5th (2009) and 4th (2015) class,
- 20 Years of Independence of Ukraine Medal (2011).

== Bibliography ==
- Овсійчук Володимир Антонович // Шевченківська енциклопедія: — Т.4:М—Па : у 6 т. / Гол. ред. М. Г. Жулинський.. — Київ : Ін-т літератури ім. Т. Г. Шевченка, 2013. — С. 660.
- Міляєва Л. Володимир Овсійчук (До 75-річчя від дня народж.) // Мист. обрії’99: Альм. К., 2000.
- Онищенко В. Вчений і патріот: До 80-річчя від дня народж. В. Овсійчука // Образотворче мистецтво. 2004. № 4.
- Володимир Овсійчук: Біобібліогр. покажч. Л., 2004.
