= Lviv National Academy of Arts =

Public university in Lviv, Ukraine

Coordinates: 49.8250°N 24.0392°E

- ДЗВО «Львівська Національна академія мистецтв»
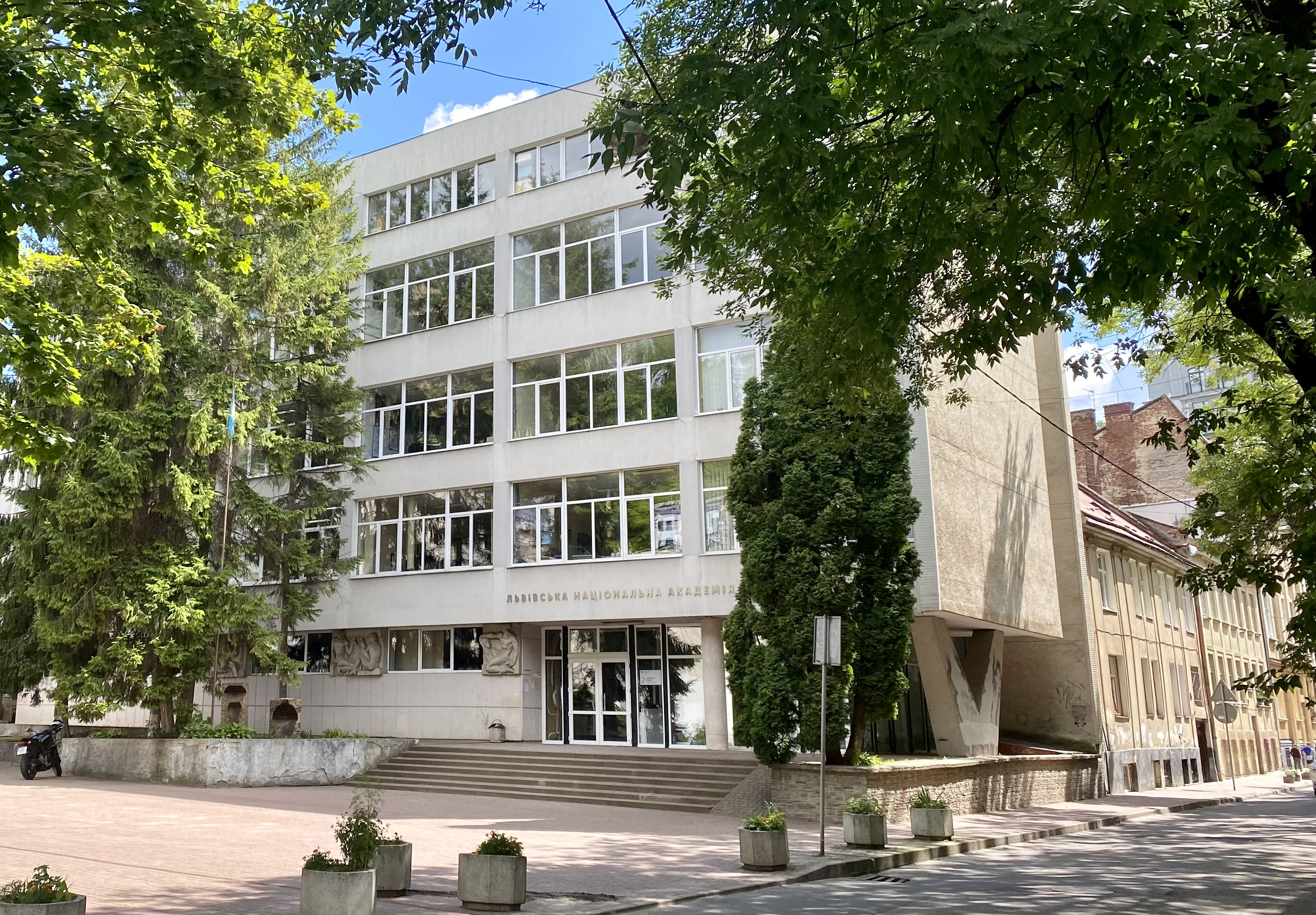
- The Lviv National Academy of the Arts
- Established: 1946
- Accreditation: Ministry of Education and Science of Ukraine
- Rector: Vasyl Kosiv
- Address: 38 Kubiyovycha Str. 79011, L'viv, Ukraine
- Website: www.lnam.edu.ua

The Lviv National Academy of Arts (Ukrainian: Львівська національна академія мистецтв) is a higher education establishment in Lviv, Ukraine.

== History ==
Officially opened in September 1946 as the Lviv State Institute of Applied and Decorative Arts, the Academy was reorganized into the Lviv Academy of Arts in 1994. On August 21, 2004 it was granted the status of a national higher educational institution by the Decree of the President of Ukraine for "significant contribution to the development of national education and science, national and international activities".

Until 2020, the Lviv National Academy of Arts was subordinated to the Ministry of Education of Ukraine. In 2020, the Ministry of Education and Science transferred the institution to the Ministry of Culture and Information Policy of Ukraine.

=== Origins and Foundation ===
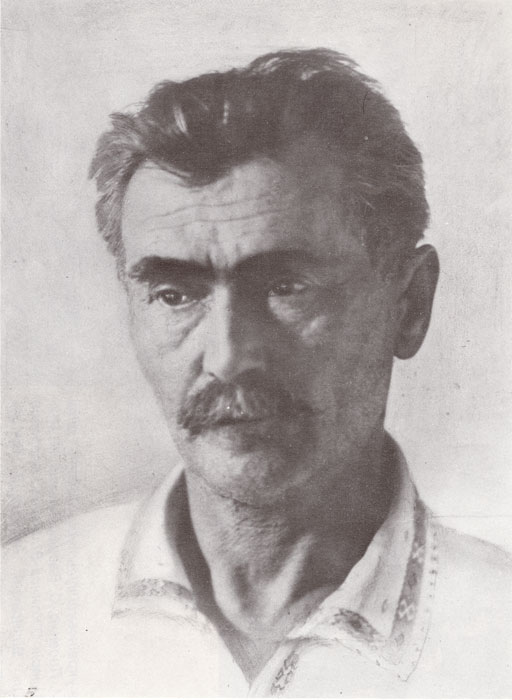
Sculptor Vasyl Krychevsky came to Lviv to become the rector of the Lviv Academy of Arts in 1944, one of the institutions which preceded the current school which opened 2 years later in 1946.

The idea of an Art Academy in Lviv began over 100 years ago. The institution is considered a legal successor of the traditions of art education initiated in Lviv, which began when the city was the capital of the province of Galicia and Lodomeria under the Austro-Hungarian Empire in the mid 19th century. It has its origin in the school of design and drawing attached to the Museum of Artistic Craft (1876), Free Academy of Art (1905), O. Novakivskyi's Art School (1923), and the Academy of Arts (which Vasyl Krychevskyi was a rector of in 1944). Prominent artists as Ivan Trush, Olena Kulchytska, Osyp Kurylas, Antin Manastyrskyi, Hryhorii Smolskyi, Sviatoslav Hordynskyi, and many others studied and then taught at these art institutions.

The foundation of the higher artistic educational institution in Lviv in 1946 was caused by an acute need of highly qualified specialists of fine art, applied and decorative art in Lviv. Hence at first the chairs of art textile, art ceramics, woodware, sculpture, and painting played the leading role. They were closely connected with the local traditions, folk art creation, and at the same time they traditionally kept on accumulating the achievements of European art education and art. During the next ten years, the Lviv Academy essentially extended its educational propositions, it was enriched with a lot of new forms and trends of artists training admittedly meets the European standards. A large competition among entrants that come from different regions of Ukraine as well as from many foreign countries is a convincing confirmation of its high level. Among the educational innovations introduced by the Lviv Academy, there are numerous specializations that correspond to the modern requirements of entrants. The matter concerns the exclusive trends of graphic design, artistic means of advertisement, monumental painting, art metal, interior design, furniture design, and new kinds of ceramics, art glass, art textile, and other media.

=== Transition to the Lviv Academy of Arts ===
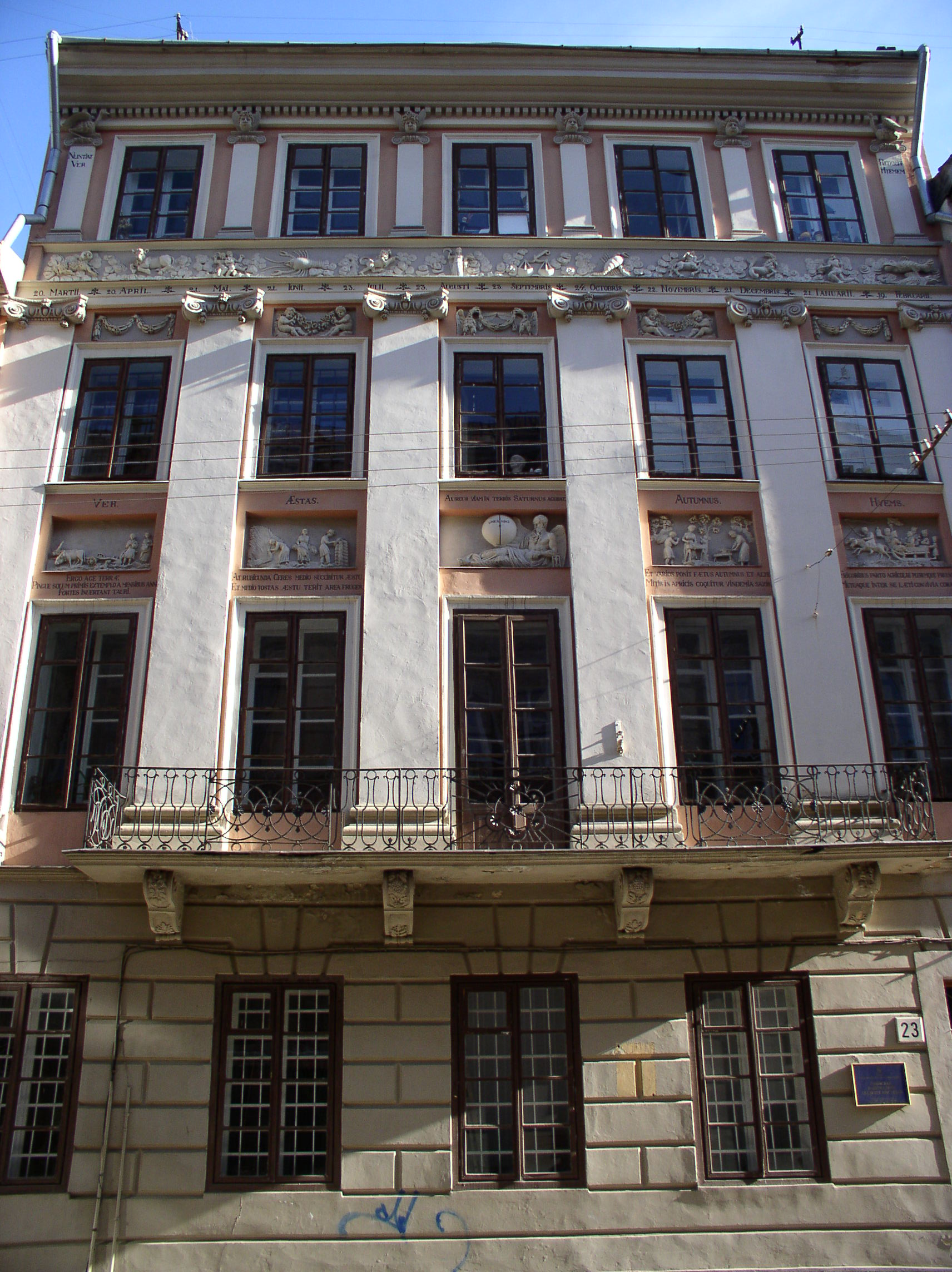
The College of Design at the Lviv National Academy of Arts

In 1994, the Lviv State Institute of Applied and Decorative Art was converted into the Lviv Academy of Arts. In 2004, it received the status of a national educational institution for its significant contribution to the development of the national education and science, state and international activity by the resolution of the Ministry of Ukraine. In the structure of the Academy, there are five departments (one of them is in Sevastopol), the Kosiv Institute of Applied and Decorative Arts (Ivano-Frankivsk region), the extension courses, the access course for entrants, the scientific and research section, the postgraduate and doctoral studies, the Specialized Academic Council dealing with the defense of Ph.D. and doctoral theses (art criticism), the scientific library, the museum, the modern art gallery, the publishing section, artistic and production workshops. Such well-known Ukrainian pedagogues, artists and art critics as I. Bokshai, I. Severa, V. Manastyrskyi, R. Smolskyi, K. Zvirynskyi, M. Fediuk, M. Vendzylovych, P. Zholtovskyi, E. Mysko, Y. Lysyk, Ia. Zapasko, V. Ovsiichuk played a dominant role in the Academy formation. They formed the author's school of painting, sculpture, applied and decorative arts, scenography, history, and theory of arts. The educational and creative studios of the leading professors are a form of art education. Among them, there are studios of the Academician, the rector of the Lviv National Academy of Arts, the T. Shevchenko prize-winner Andriy Bokotey (blown glass), People's artist Liubomyr Medvid (monumental painting), the professor, Honoured artist of Ukraine Oleg Minko (art textile), the Academician, the Franko prize-winner Ya. Zapasko and Corresponding member, the T. Shevchenko prize-winner V. Ovsiichuk (art criticism), the professor, People's Artist of Ukraine I. Samotos (monumental sculpture), the professor, Honoured works of art R. Vasylyk (sacral art), the doctor of Art Criticism O. Bodnar (theory of design), Honoured Artist of Ukraine O. Bonkovsky (art metal) and others.

21 graduates of the Academy became T. Shevchenko prize-winners. Modern development of the Academy is impossible without active collaboration with home and foreign higher educational institutions. First of all, it concerns long and productive collaboration with Kyiv National Academy of Fine Arts and Architecture and the Kharkiv Academy of Design and Art. Among foreign educational institutions, there are a good few of famous European art academies and institutes in Poland, France, Hungary, Austria, Bulgaria, Russia, Baltic countries. It is especially actual in terms of European educational integration. In 1993 the Educational – Scientific and Creative Complex was founded on the basis of the Academy. Its activity became the effective methods of realization of state programs. Twenty-two educational institutions of Ukraine of the 1st – 4th accreditation form parts of it. These educational institutions train specialists in art, design, restoration, and art criticism.

== Faculties ==
Faculty of design

- Graphic Design
- Interior Design
- Clothing Design

Faculty of decorative and applied arts

- Art Textile
- Art Ceramic
- Art Glass
- Art Woodware
- Art Metalware

Faculty of fine arts and restoration

- Monumental Painting
- Monumental and Decorative Sculpture
- Restoration of Works of Art
- Sacral Art
- Drawing
- Academic Painting

Faculty of history and theory of arts

- Art Management
- History and Theory of Art
- Humanities
- Languages and Literature
- Physical Education

Sevastopol faculty

- Graphic Design
- Interior Design

== Rectors ==
- Hennadii Leonov (1946–1952);
- Feofan Pavliuchenko (1952–1954);
- Oleksii Sydorov (1954–1958);
- Yakym Zapasko (1958–1971);
- Valentyn Borysenko (1971–1977);
- Ihor Serediuk (1977–1988);
- Emmanuil Mysko (1988–2000);
- Andriy Bokotey (2000–2015);
- Volodymyr Odrekhivskyi (2016–2021);
- Vasyl Kosiv (from 2021).

== Notable people tied to the Lviv National Academy of Arts ==
- Giennadij Jerszow, studied 1988-1991
- Liudmyla Zhogol, People's Artist of Ukraine
- Alexander Klevan, studied 1974–1979
- Witold Manastyrski, instructor
- Faina Petryakova – a distinguished professor, Doctor of Sciences, a researcher in the field of Ukrainian glass work, porcelain and Ukrainian Judaica.
- Tetiana Vytiahlovska, textile artist and tapestry weaver

== See also ==
List of universities in Ukraine
